= Leyte's 3rd congressional district =

Legislative district of the Philippines

- Constituency for the House of Representatives of the Philippines
- Boundary of Leyte's 3rd congressional district in Leyte
- Location of Leyte within the Philippines
- Province: Leyte
- Region: Eastern Visayas
- Population: 179,492 (2020)
- Electorate: 131,736 (2022)
- Major settlements: 5 LGUs: Municipalities; Calubian; Leyte; San Isidro; Tabango; Villaba
- Area: 651.64 km^{2} (251.60 sq mi)

Current constituency
- Created: 1907
- Representative: Anna Victoria V. Tuazon
- Political party: NUP
- Congressional bloc: Majority

Leyte's 3rd congressional district is one of the five congressional districts of the Philippines in the province of Leyte. It has been represented in the House of Representatives of the Philippines since 1916 and earlier in the Philippine Assembly from 1907 to 1916. The district consists of the old provincial capital, Leyte, and adjacent municipalities of Calubian, San Isidro, Tabango and Villaba. It is currently represented in the 20th Congress by Anna Victoria V. Tuazon of the National Unity Party (NUP).

Until 1931, it consisted of the north-central municipalities of Abuyog, Barugo, Burauen, Capoocan, Carigara, Dagami, Hinunangan, Hinundayan, Jaro, La Paz, and Pastrana. Following the creation of the fifth district, it was redefined to consist of the southern municipalities of undivided Leyte that now form part of Southern Leyte, until they were transferred to the new province's at-large district in 1961, three years after its establishment. The district was subsequently redefined to consist of the sub-province of Biliran and the northern municipalities of Calubian, Isabel, Leyte, Matag-ob, Merida, Palompon, San Isidro, Tabango, and Villaba, all previously from the first district, from 1961 until its second dissolution in 1972. Re-established in 1987, it included its current northern municipalities and the sub-province of Biliran, which was separated effective 1995 as its provincial status and separate representation were ratified in 1992.

== Representation history ==
#	Image	Member	Term of office		Legislature	Party	Electoral history	Constituent LGUs
#	Image	Member	Start	End	Legislature	Party	Electoral history	Constituent LGUs
=== Leyte's 3rd district for the Philippine Assembly ===
District created January 9, 1907.
1		Florentino Peñaranda	October 16, 1907	October 16, 1909	1st	Nacionalista	Elected in 1907.	1907–1909; Abuyog, Barugo, Burauen, Carigara, Dagami, Hinunangan, Jaro
2		Abdón Marchadesch	October 16, 1909	October 16, 1912	2nd	Independent	Elected in 1909.	1909–1912; Abuyog, Barugo, Burauen, Carigara, Dagami, Hinunangan, Jaro, Pastrana
3		Miguel Romuáldez	October 16, 1912	October 16, 1916	3rd	Independent	Elected in 1912.	1912–1916; Abuyog, Barugo, Burauen, Carigara, Dagami, Hinunangan, Hinundayan, Jaro, La Paz, Pastrana
=== Leyte's 3rd district for the House of Representatives of the Philippine Islands ===
4		Segundo Apostol	October 16, 1916	June 3, 1919	4th	Nacionalista	Elected in 1916.	1916–1919; Abuyog, Barugo, Burauen, Carigara, Dagami, Hinunangan, Hinundayan, Jaro, La Paz, Pastrana
5		Julio Siayngco	June 3, 1919	June 6, 1922	5th	Independent	Elected in 1919.	1919–1931; Abuyog, Barugo, Burauen, Capoocan, Carigara, Dagami, Hinunangan, Hinundayan, Jaro, La Paz, Pastrana
6		José María Veloso	June 6, 1922	June 2, 1925	6th	Nacionalista; Colectivista	Elected in 1922.	1919–1931; Abuyog, Barugo, Burauen, Capoocan, Carigara, Dagami, Hinunangan, Hinundayan, Jaro, La Paz, Pastrana
7		Ruperto Kapunan	June 2, 1925	June 5, 1928	7th	Nacionalista; Consolidado	Elected in 1925.	1919–1931; Abuyog, Barugo, Burauen, Capoocan, Carigara, Dagami, Hinunangan, Hinundayan, Jaro, La Paz, Pastrana
8		Jorge B. Delgado	June 5, 1928	June 2, 1931	8th	Nacionalista; Consolidado	Elected in 1928.	1919–1931; Abuyog, Barugo, Burauen, Capoocan, Carigara, Dagami, Hinunangan, Hinundayan, Jaro, La Paz, Pastrana
9		Tomás Oppus	June 2, 1931	September 16, 1935	9th	Nacionalista; Consolidado	Elected in 1931.	1931–1935; Anahawan, Cabalian, Hinunangan, Hinundayan, Libagon, Liloan, Maasin, Macrohon, Malitbog, Pintuyan, Sogod
9		Tomás Oppus	June 2, 1931	September 16, 1935	10th	Nacionalista; Democrático	Re-elected in 1934.	1931–1935; Anahawan, Cabalian, Hinunangan, Hinundayan, Libagon, Liloan, Maasin, Macrohon, Malitbog, Pintuyan, Sogod
#	Image	Member	Term of office		National Assembly	Party	Electoral history	Constituent LGUs
#	Image	Member	Start	End	National Assembly	Party	Electoral history	Constituent LGUs
=== Leyte's 3rd district for the National Assembly (Commonwealth of the Philippines) ===
(9)		Tomás Oppus	September 16, 1935	December 30, 1941	1st	Nacionalista; Democrático	Re-elected in 1935.	1935–1941; Anahawan, Cabalian, Hinunangan, Hinundayan, Libagon, Liloan, Maasin, Macrohon, Malitbog, Pintuyan, Sogod
(9)		Tomás Oppus	September 16, 1935	December 30, 1941	2nd	Nacionalista	Re-elected in 1938.	1935–1941; Anahawan, Cabalian, Hinunangan, Hinundayan, Libagon, Liloan, Maasin, Macrohon, Malitbog, Pintuyan, Sogod
District dissolved into the two-seat Leyte's at-large district for the National Assembly (Second Philippine Republic).
#	Image	Member	Term of office		Common wealth Congress	Party	Electoral history	Constituent LGUs
#	Image	Member	Start	End	Common wealth Congress	Party	Electoral history	Constituent LGUs
=== Leyte's 3rd district for the House of Representatives of the Commonwealth of the Philippines ===
District re-created May 24, 1945.
(9)		Tomás Oppus	June 11, 1945	May 25, 1946	1st	Nacionalista	Re-elected in 1941.	1945–1946; Anahawan, Cabalian, Hinunangan, Hinundayan, Libagon, Liloan, Maasin, Macrohon, Malitbog, Pintuyan, Sogod
#	Image	Member	Term of office		Congress	Party	Electoral history	Constituent LGUs
#	Image	Member	Start	End	Congress	Party	Electoral history	Constituent LGUs
=== Leyte's 3rd district for the House of Representatives of the Philippines ===
10		Francisco M. Pajao	May 25, 1946	December 30, 1957	1st	Liberal	Elected in 1946.	1946–1953; Anahawan, Cabalian, Hinunangan, Hinundayan, Libagon, Liloan, Maasin, Macrohon, Malitbog, Pintuyan, Sogod
10		Francisco M. Pajao	May 25, 1946	December 30, 1957	2nd	Liberal	Re-elected in 1949.	1946–1953; Anahawan, Cabalian, Hinunangan, Hinundayan, Libagon, Liloan, Maasin, Macrohon, Malitbog, Pintuyan, Sogod
10		Francisco M. Pajao	May 25, 1946	December 30, 1957	3rd	Liberal	Re-elected in 1953.	1953–1957; Anahawan, Bontoc, Cabalian, Hinunangan, Hinundayan, Libagon, Liloan, Maasin, Macrohon, Malitbog, Pintuyan, Saint Bernard, Silago, Sogod
11		Nicanor Yñíguez	December 30, 1957	December 30, 1961	4th	Nacionalista	Elected in 1957. Redistricted to Southern Leyte's at-large district.	1957–1961; Anahawan, Bontoc, Cabalian, Hinunangan, Hinundayan, Libagon, Liloan, Maasin, Macrohon, Malitbog, Padre Burgos, Pintuyan, Saint Bernard, Silago, Sogod
12		Marcelino Veloso	December 30, 1961	September 23, 1972	5th	Nacionalista	Redistricted from the 1st district and re-elected in 1961.	1961–1972; Almeria, Biliran, Cabucgayan, Caibiran, Calubian, Culaba, Isabel, Kawayan, Leyte, Maripipi, Matag-ob, Merida, Naval, Palompon, San Isidro, Tabango, Villaba
12		Marcelino Veloso	December 30, 1961	September 23, 1972	6th	Nacionalista	Re-elected in 1965.	1961–1972; Almeria, Biliran, Cabucgayan, Caibiran, Calubian, Culaba, Isabel, Kawayan, Leyte, Maripipi, Matag-ob, Merida, Naval, Palompon, San Isidro, Tabango, Villaba
12		Marcelino Veloso	December 30, 1961	September 23, 1972	7th	Nacionalista	Re-elected in 1969. Removed from office after imposition of martial law.	1961–1972; Almeria, Biliran, Cabucgayan, Caibiran, Calubian, Culaba, Isabel, Kawayan, Leyte, Maripipi, Matag-ob, Merida, Naval, Palompon, San Isidro, Tabango, Villaba
District dissolved into the ten-seat Region VIII's at-large district for the Interim Batasang Pambansa, followed by the five-seat Leyte's at-large district for the Regular Batasang Pambansa.
District re-created February 2, 1987.
13		Alberto S. Veloso	June 30, 1987	June 30, 1998	8th	Nacionalista	Elected in 1987.	1987–1995; Almeria, Biliran, Cabucgayan, Caibiran, Calubian, Culaba, Kawayan, Leyte, Maripipi, Naval, San Isidro, Tabango, Villaba
13		Alberto S. Veloso	June 30, 1987	June 30, 1998	9th	LDP	Re-elected in 1992.	1987–1995; Almeria, Biliran, Cabucgayan, Caibiran, Calubian, Culaba, Kawayan, Leyte, Maripipi, Naval, San Isidro, Tabango, Villaba
13		Alberto S. Veloso	June 30, 1987	June 30, 1998	10th	Lakas	Re-elected in 1995.	1995–present Calubian, Leyte, San Isidro, Tabango, Villaba
14		Eduardo K. Veloso	June 30, 1998	June 30, 2007	11th	NPC	Elected in 1998.	1995–present Calubian, Leyte, San Isidro, Tabango, Villaba
14		Eduardo K. Veloso	June 30, 1998	June 30, 2007	12th	Lakas	Re-elected in 2001.	1995–present Calubian, Leyte, San Isidro, Tabango, Villaba
14		Eduardo K. Veloso	June 30, 1998	June 30, 2007	13th	Lakas	Re-elected in 2004.	1995–present Calubian, Leyte, San Isidro, Tabango, Villaba
15		Andres D. Salvacion Jr.	June 30, 2007	June 30, 2016	14th	Lakas	Elected in 2007.	1995–present Calubian, Leyte, San Isidro, Tabango, Villaba
15		Andres D. Salvacion Jr.	June 30, 2007	June 30, 2016	15th	Liberal	Re-elected in 2010.	1995–present Calubian, Leyte, San Isidro, Tabango, Villaba
15		Andres D. Salvacion Jr.	June 30, 2007	June 30, 2016	16th	Liberal	Re-elected in 2013.	1995–present Calubian, Leyte, San Isidro, Tabango, Villaba
16		Vicente Sofronio E. Veloso III	June 30, 2016	June 30, 2022	17th	NUP	Elected in 2016.	1995–present Calubian, Leyte, San Isidro, Tabango, Villaba
16		Vicente Sofronio E. Veloso III	June 30, 2016	June 30, 2022	18th	NUP	Re-elected in 2019.	1995–present Calubian, Leyte, San Isidro, Tabango, Villaba
17		Anna Victoria V. Tuazon	June 30, 2022	Incumbent	19th	NUP	Elected in 2022.	1995–present Calubian, Leyte, San Isidro, Tabango, Villaba
17		Anna Victoria V. Tuazon	June 30, 2022	Incumbent	20th	NUP	Re-elected in 2025.	1995–present Calubian, Leyte, San Isidro, Tabango, Villaba

== Election results ==
=== 2025 ===
Candidate	Party	Votes	%
Anna Veloso-Tuazon	National Unity Party	57,303	53.47
Wingwing Veloso	Partido Federal ng Pilipinas	49,861	46.53
Total		107,164	100.00
Valid votes		107,164	91.29
Invalid/blank votes		10,226	8.71
Total votes		117,390	100.00
Registered voters/turnout		133,378	88.01
National Unity Party hold			
Source: Commission on Elections

=== 2022 ===
2022 Philippine House of Representatives elections
Party	Candidate	Votes	%
NUP	Anna Veloso-Tuazon	53,457	100.00%
Total votes		53,457	100.00%
NUP hold			

=== 2019 ===
2019 Philippine House of Representatives elections
Party	Candidate	Votes	%
NUP	Ching Veloso (incumbent)	53,581	
NPC	Andres "Andy" Salvacion Jr.	43,012	
Total votes			100.00%
NUP hold			

=== 2016 ===
2016 Philippine House of Representatives elections
Party	Candidate	Votes	%
NUP	Ching Veloso	43,333	50.03%
Liberal	Tingting Salvacion	43,277	49.97%
Valid ballots		86,610	88.05%
Margin of victory		56	0.06%
Invalid or blank votes		11,754	11.95%
Total votes		98,364	100.00%
NUP gain from Liberal			

=== 2013 ===
2013 Philippine House of Representatives elections
Party	Candidate	Votes	%
Liberal	Andres "Andy" Salvacion Jr.	31,088	54.15
UNA	Bernard Jonathan Ramandaban	20,773	36.18
Margin of victory		10,315	17.97%
Invalid or blank votes		5,547	9.66
Total votes		57,408	100.00
Liberal hold			

=== 2010 ===
2010 Philippine House of Representatives elections
Party	Candidate	Votes	%
Lakas–Kampi	Andres "Andy" Salvacion Jr.	48,083	59.48
Nacionalista	Eduardo Veloso	31,311	38.73
Liberal	Edwin Pfleider	1,007	1.25
Independent	Paquito Pelipel, Jr.	435	0.54
Valid ballots		80.836	92.44
Invalid or blank votes		6,615	7.56
Total votes		87,451	100.00
Lakas–Kampi hold			

== See also ==
- Legislative districts of Leyte
