= Calubian =

Municipality in Leyte, Philippines

- Municipality
- Municipality of Calubian
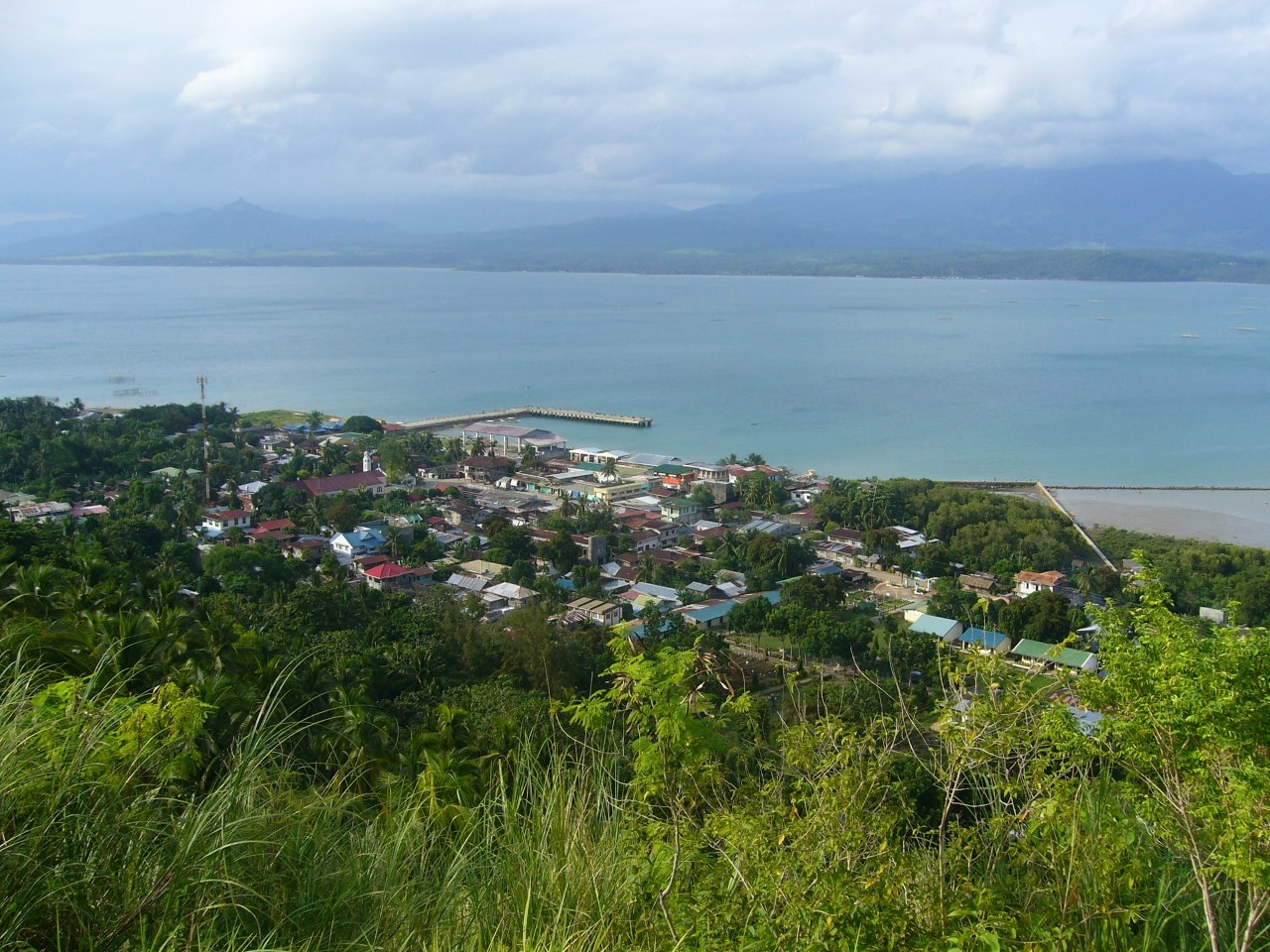
- Hilltop view of Calubian

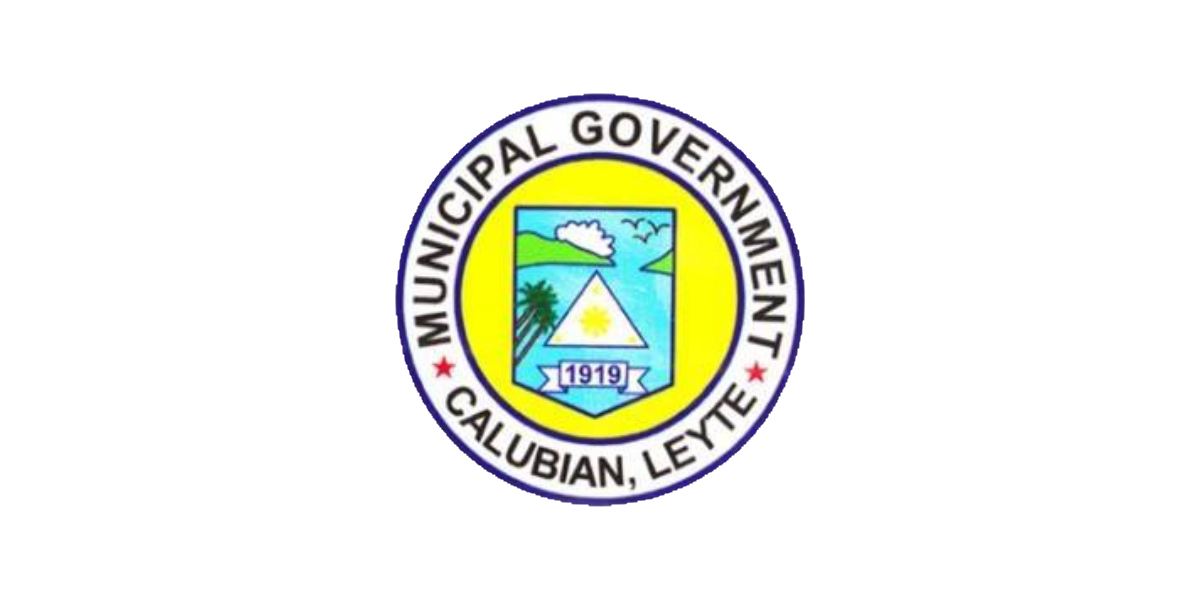
- Flag

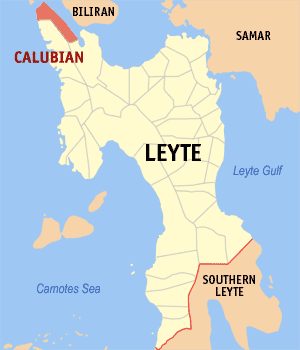
- Map of Leyte with Calubian highlighted
- Interactive map of Calubian
- Location within the Philippines
- Coordinates: 11°26′48″N 124°25′40″E
- Country: Philippines
- Region: Eastern Visayas
- Province: Leyte
- District: 3rd district
- Founded: January 8, 1919
- Barangays: 53 (see Barangays)

Government
  - Type: Sangguniang Bayan
  - Mayor: Marciano A. Batiancela Jr.
  - Vice Mayor: Bing Veloso
  - Representative: Anna Victoria V. Tuazon
  - Councilors: List: • Yanyan Batiancela; • Noel Eamiguel; • Eugenio A. Ching; • Ester Lubiano; • Julia Halichic; • Benjie Calbitaza; • Alyza Nierras; • Lucita Palconit; DILG Masterlist of Officials
  - Electorate: 25,058 voters (2025)

Area
  - Total: 100.95 km^{2} (38.98 sq mi)
- Elevation: 82 m (269 ft)
- Highest elevation: 1,336 m (4,383 ft)
- Lowest elevation: 0 m (0 ft)

Population (2024 census)
  - Total: 31,990
  - Density: 316.9/km^{2} (820.7/sq mi)
  - Households: 8,670

Economy
  - Income class: 3rd municipal income class
  - Poverty incidence: 28.22% (2023)
  - Revenue: ₱ 159.9 million (2024)
  - Assets: ₱ 441.2 million (2024)
  - Expenditure: ₱ 178.2 million (2024)
  - Liabilities: ₱ 150.8 million (2024)

Service provider
  - Electricity: Leyte 5 Electric Cooperative (LEYECO 5)
- Time zone: UTC+8 (PST)
- ZIP code: 6534
- PSGC: 0803713000
- IDD : area code: +63 (0)53
- Native languages: Cebuano; Tagalog

Calubian, officially the Municipality of Calubian (Waray: Bungto han Calubian; Cebuano: Lungsod sa Calubian; Tagalog: Bayan ng Calubian), is a municipality in the province of Leyte, Philippines. According to the 2024 census, it has a population of 31,990 people.

== History ==
On January 8, 1919, Governor-General Charles E. Yeater issued Executive Order No. 4, creating the town of Calubian, which is formerly a barrio of the Municipality of Leyte, Leyte. Originally, its name was Eulalia in honor of a prominent lady resident. Later, it was changed to Calubian due to the vast coconut plantation of the place.

The Local Government of Calubian was formerly organized on January 22, 1919, with Felix Garganera as its first town executive. In 1922, he was succeeded by Nepumoceno Torlao, a generous resident of the locality. Then Alejandro Baronda took the reign as Local Chief Executive from 1931 to 1934. From 1934 to 1937, Felix Lafuente became the Town Chief followed by Francisco Enage in 1938 to 1940 and later on Enrique Q. Enage led the town from 1941 to 1942. They were followed by Lorenzo Mendoza from 1942 to 1944. Honorato Agas Sr led his people from 1945 to April 15, 1986, except for one term 1952-1953 when he was defeated by Rosendo Eamiguel, a popular landlord of Barangay Villalon.

The popular People Power Revolution on February 25, 1986 brought an end to Agas’ term and Victorio Loygos Sr. was eventually appointed as the OIC Mayor from April 16, 1986, to May 1987. Engr. Rolando R. Amparado succeeded him by appointment from June 24, 1987, to November 30, 1987, followed by Marciano Batiancela Jr from December 1, 1987, until the newly elected Local Chief Executive in the person of Dr. Carlos C. Cotiangco Jr. assumed office on February 8, 1988. He has done tremendous accomplishment in the Metro-Calubian by accomplishing several infrastructure projects such as concreting of municipal and barangay roads, public markets, waiting sheds, completion of municipal hall, improvement of the drainage system, multi-purpose pavements and water works projects.

== Geography ==
=== Barangays ===
Calubian is politically subdivided into 53 barangays. Each barangay consists of puroks and some have sitios.

- Abanilla
- Anislagan
- Bunacan
- Cabalquinto
- Cabalhin
- Cabradilla
- Caneja
- Cantonghao
- Caroyocan
- Casiongan
- Cristina
- Dalumpines
- Don Luis
- Dulao
- Efe (Ul-og)
- Enage
- Espinosa
- Ferdinand E. Marcos
- Garganera
- Garrido
- Guadalupe
- Gutosan
- Igang
- Inalad
- Jubay
- Juson
- Kawayan Bogtong
- Kawayanan
- Kokoy Romualdez
- Labtic
- Laray
- Limite (Agas)
- Manuel Veloso
- Mahait
- Malobago
- Matagok
- Nierras
- Nipa
- Obispo
- Pagatpat
- Pangpang
- Patag
- Pates
- Pal-og
- Padoga
- Petrolio
- Poblacion
- Railes
- Tabla
- Tagharigue
- Tuburan
- Villahermosa
- Villalon
- Villanueva

=== Climate ===
Climate data for Calubian, Leyte
Month	Jan	Feb	Mar	Apr	May	Jun	Jul	Aug	Sep	Oct	Nov	Dec	Year
Mean daily maximum °C (°F)	28 (82)	29 (84)	29 (84)	31 (88)	31 (88)	30 (86)	30 (86)	30 (86)	30 (86)	29 (84)	29 (84)	29 (84)	30 (85)
Mean daily minimum °C (°F)	22 (72)	22 (72)	22 (72)	23 (73)	24 (75)	25 (77)	25 (77)	25 (77)	25 (77)	24 (75)	24 (75)	25 (77)	24 (75)
Average precipitation mm (inches)	73 (2.9)	56 (2.2)	75 (3.0)	71 (2.8)	114 (4.5)	174 (6.9)	172 (6.8)	163 (6.4)	167 (6.6)	161 (6.3)	158 (6.2)	125 (4.9)	1,509 (59.5)
Average rainy days	15.2	12.5	16.2	17.3	23.9	27.3	28.4	26.9	26.9	27.1	23.8	19.3	264.8
Source: Meteoblue (Use with caution: this is modeled/calculated data, not measured locally.)

== Demographics ==
Population census of Calubian

Year	Pop.	±% p.a.
1939	14,027	—
1948	19,423	+3.68%
1960	30,354	+3.79%
1970	26,661	−1.29%
1975	25,821	−0.64%
1980	26,564	+0.57%
1990	25,968	−0.23%

Year	Pop.	±% p.a.
1995	31,074	+3.42%
2000	28,421	−1.89%
2007	29,945	+0.72%
2010	29,619	−0.40%
2015	31,228	+1.01%
2020	31,646	+0.28%
2024	31,990	+0.26%

Source: Philippine Statistics Authority

In the 2024 census, the population of Calubian was 31,990 people, with a density of 320 inhabitants per square kilometer or 830 inhabitants per square mile.

== Economy ==
Poverty incidence of Calubian (%)

Source: Philippine Statistics Authority

== Local Government ==
2025-2028 Calubian, Leyte Officials
Position	Name	Party
Mayor	Marciano A. Batiancela Jr	NUP
Vice Mayor	Anna Love O. Veloso	NUP
Councilors	Eduardo R. Omega	NUP
Councilors	Jullian Marc A. Batiancela	NUP
Councilors	Ralph Anthony George D. Martinez	NUP
Councilors	Noel G. Eamiguel	NUP
Councilors	Ester P. Lubiano	NUP
Councilors	Julia E. Halichic	NUP
Councilors	Eugenio A. Ching Jr.	NUP
Councilors	Ben Leo C. Ruña	NUP
Ex Officio Municipal Council Members
ABC President	TBD	Nonpartisan
SK Federation President	TBD	Nonpartisan

== Gallery ==
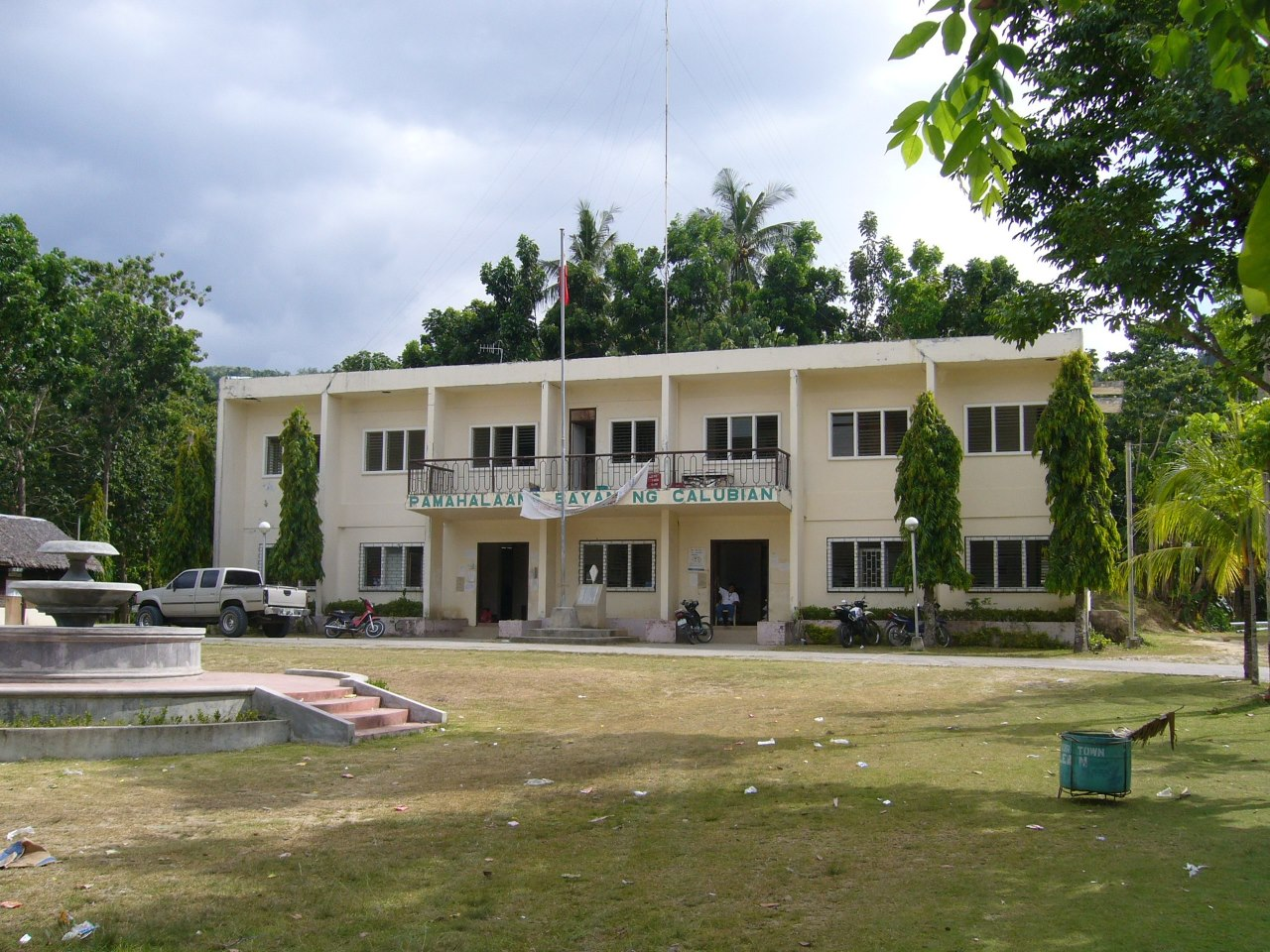
Municipal Hall

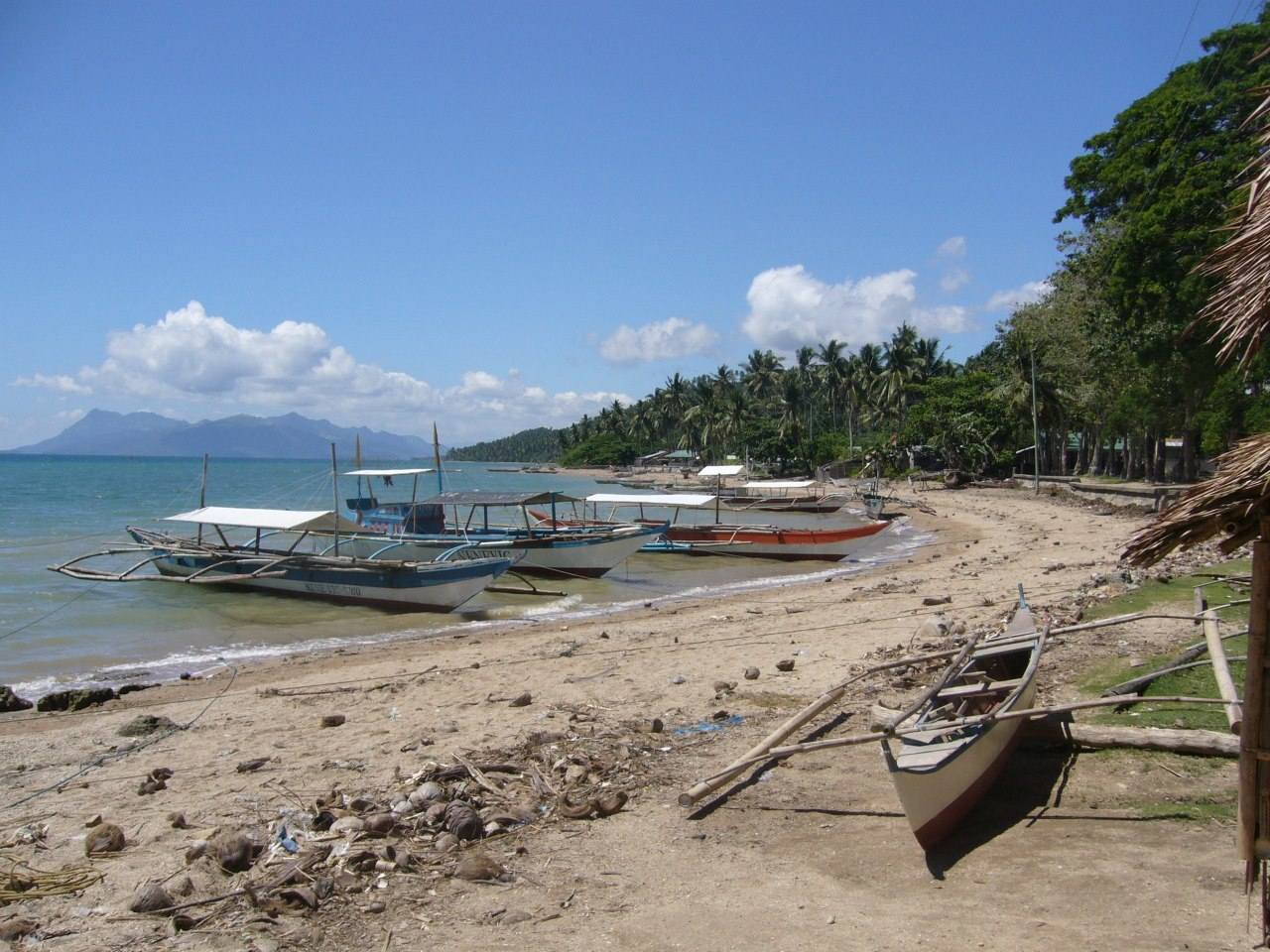
View along the waterfront at Barangay Villalon

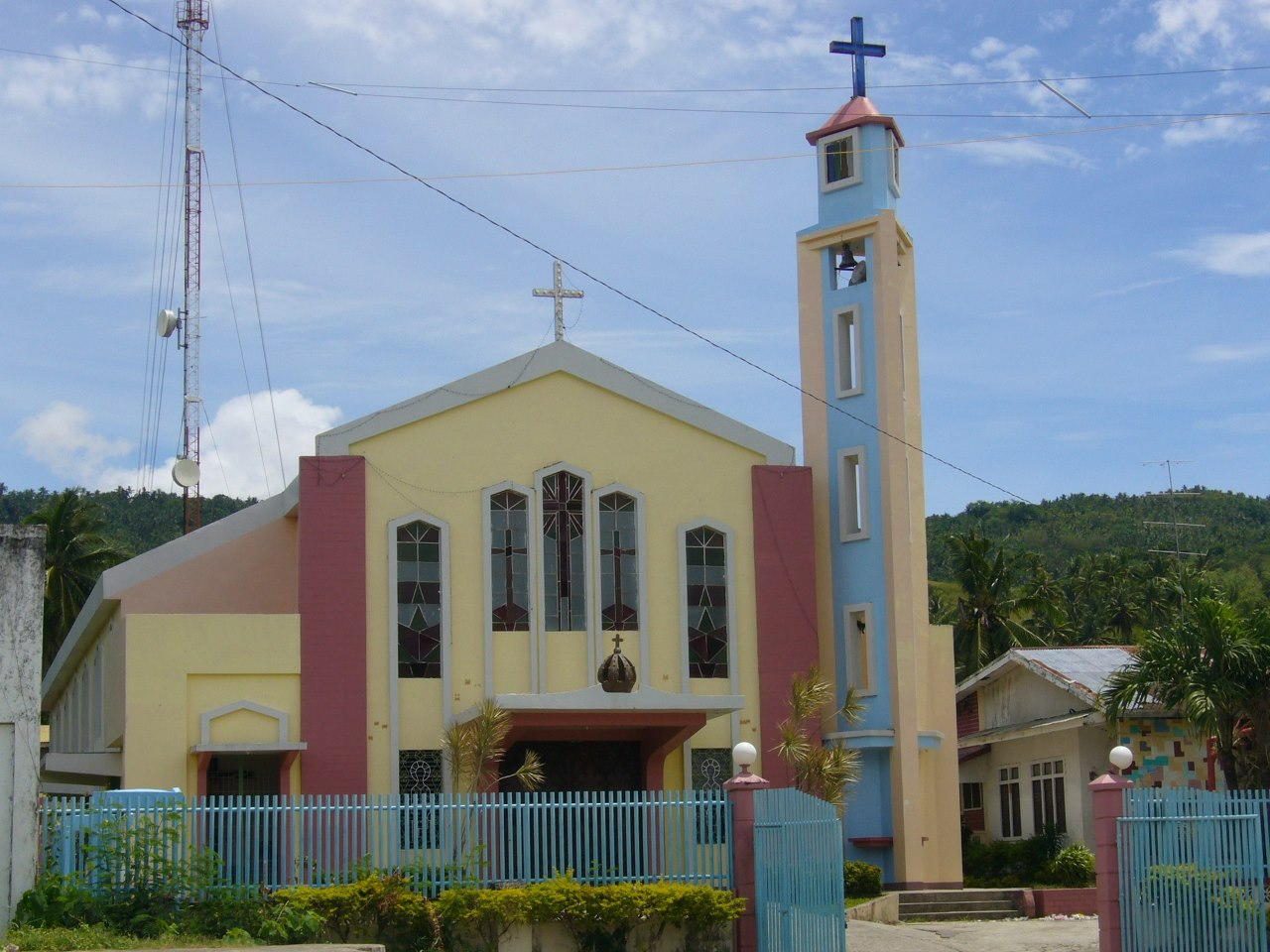
Our Lady of Fatima Parish Church

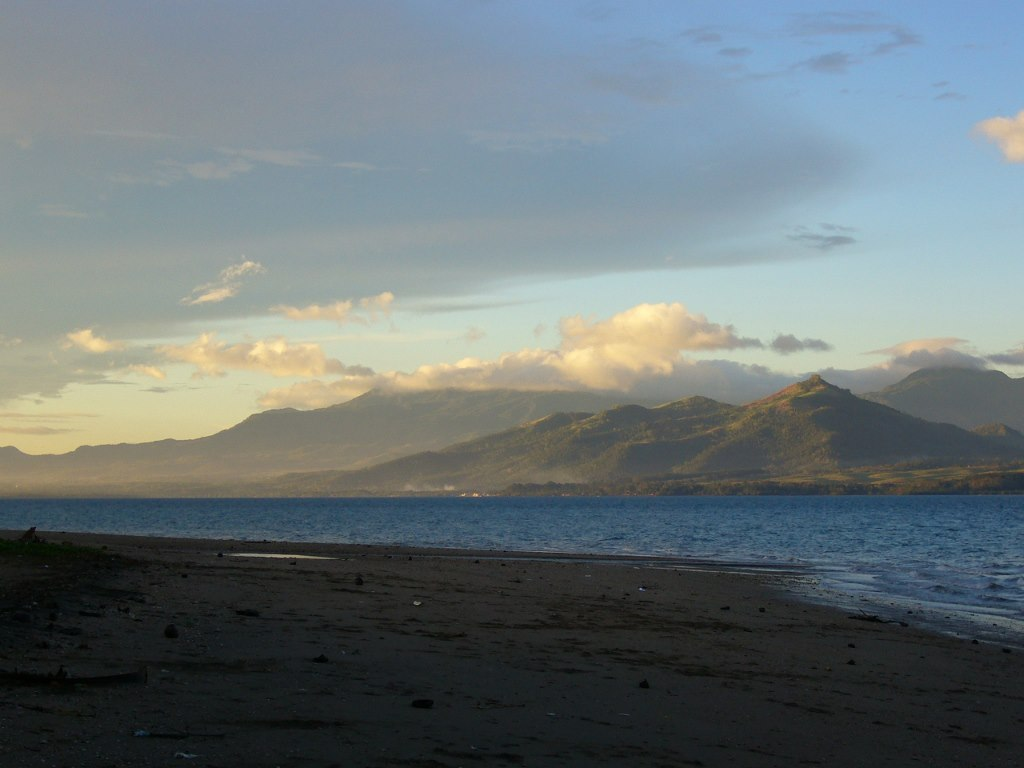
Sunset view from Lotus Beach Resort at Barangay Abanilla. Biliran Island in the distance.

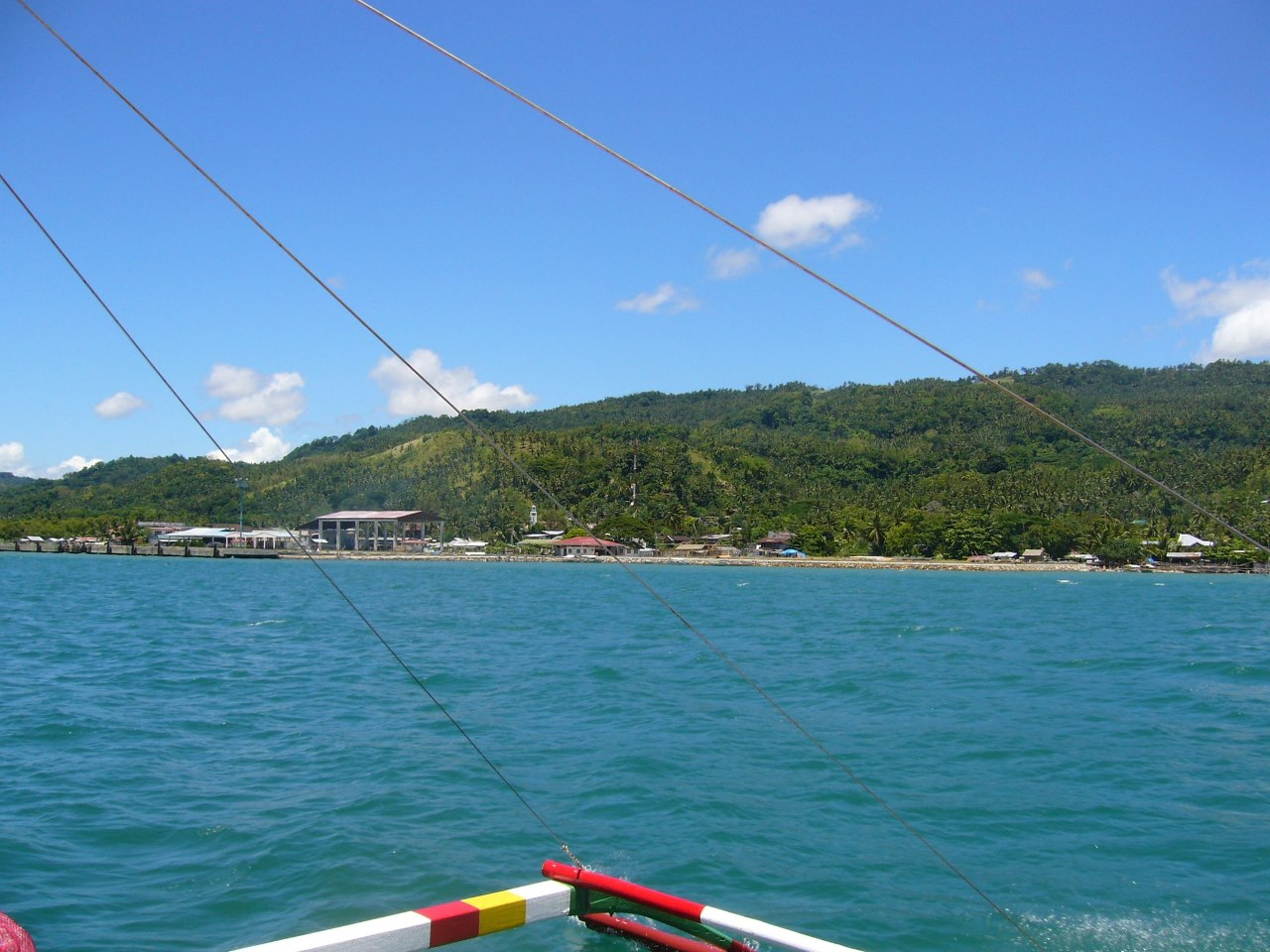
View of Calubian from approaching boat.

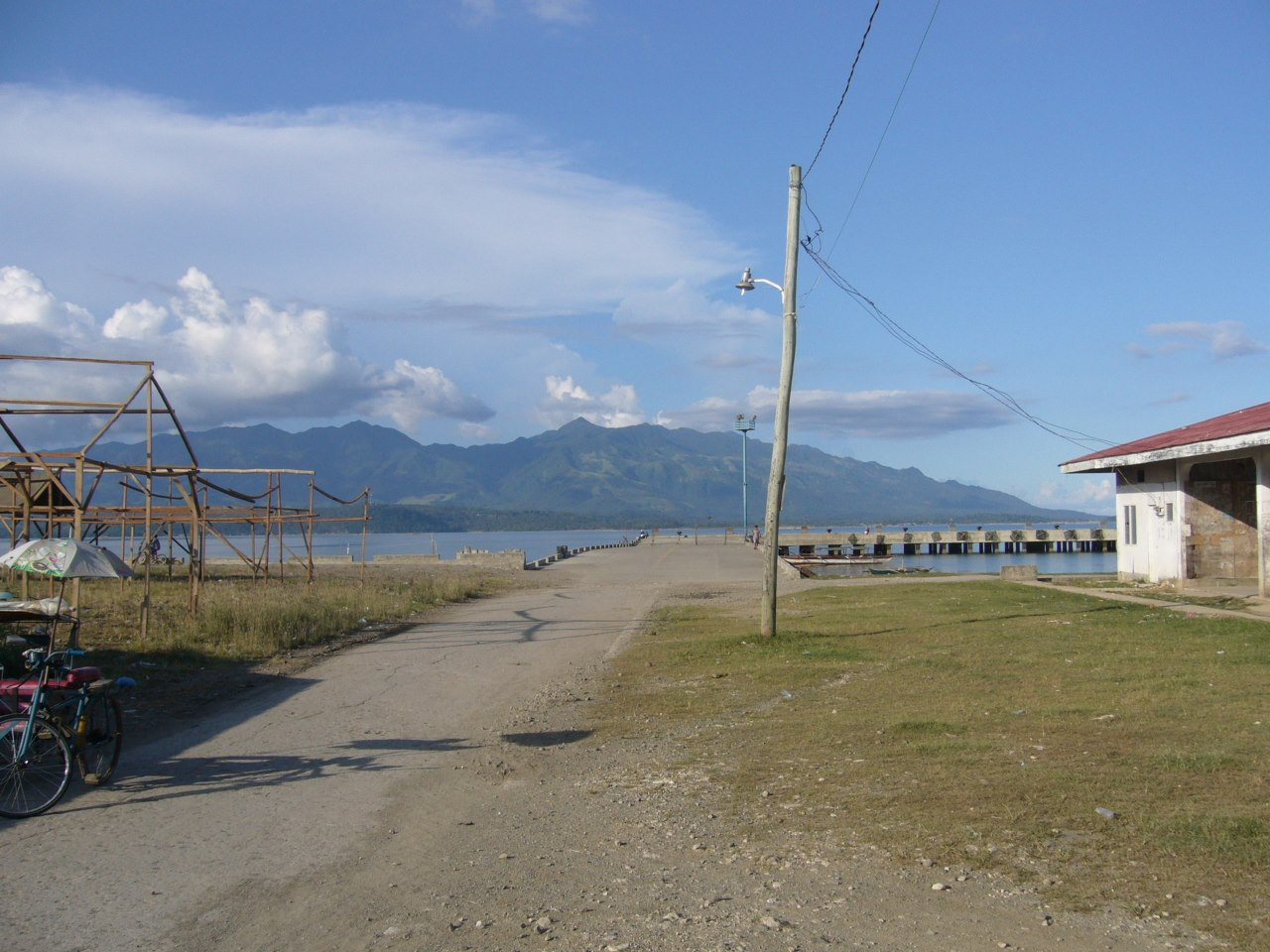
View out over the pier area towards the mountains of Biliran Island
