= 2025 Philippine House of Representatives elections in Eastern Visayas =

- May 12, 2025
- All 13 Eastern Visayas seats in the House of Representatives
Party	Seats	+/–
Lakas	5	+3
Nacionalista	2	−1
NUP	2	−2
PFP	2	+2
NPC	1	New
Independent	1	+1
This lists parties that won seats. See the complete results below.

The 2025 Philippine House of Representatives elections in Eastern Visayas were held on May 12, 2025, as part of the 2025 Philippine general election.

== Summary ==
Congressional district	Incumbent	Incumbent's party	Winner	Winner's party	Winning margin
Biliran	Gerardo Espina Jr.	Lakas	Gerardo Espina Jr.	Lakas	Unopposed
Eastern Samar	Maria Fe Abunda	Lakas	Sheen Gonzales	Independent	24.30%
Leyte–1st	Martin Romualdez	Lakas	Martin Romualdez	Lakas	Unopposed
Leyte–2nd	Lolita Javier	Nacionalista	Lolita Javier	Nacionalista	60.06%
Leyte–3rd	Anna Veloso-Tuazon	NUP	Anna Veloso-Tuazon	NUP	6.94%
Leyte–4th	Richard Gomez	PFP	Richard Gomez	PFP	13.88%
Leyte–5th	Carl Cari	Lakas	Carl Cari	Lakas	51.88%
Northern Samar–1st	Paul Daza	NUP	Niko Raul Daza	NUP	78.50%
Northern Samar–2nd	Harris Ongchuan	NUP	Edwin Ongchuan	PFP	73.98%
Samar–1st	Stephen James Tan	Nacionalista	Stephen James Tan	Nacionalista	Unopposed
Samar–2nd	Reynolds Michael Tan	Lakas	Reynolds Michael Tan	Lakas	Unopposed
Southern Leyte–1st	Luz Mercado	Lakas	Roger Mercado	NPC	39.38%
Southern Leyte–2nd	Christopherson Yap	Lakas	Christopherson Yap	Lakas	4.36%

== Biliran ==
Incumbent Gerardo Espina Jr. of Lakas–CMD won re-election for a third term unopposed.

Candidate	Party	Votes	%
Gerardo Espina Jr. (incumbent)	Lakas–CMD	76,884	100.00
Total		76,884	100.00
Valid votes		76,884	74.22
Invalid/blank votes		26,705	25.78
Total votes		103,589	100.00
Registered voters/turnout		124,191	83.41
Lakas hold			
Source: Commission on Elections

== Eastern Samar ==
Incumbent Maria Fe Abunda of Lakas–CMD ran for a third term. She was previously affiliated with PDP–Laban with 94.59%.

Abunda was defeated by former Guiuan mayor Sheen Gonzales, an independent. Arnold Azura (Independent) also ran for representative.

Candidate	Party	Votes	%
Sheen Gonzales	Independent	180,393	61.22
Maria Fe Abunda (incumbent)	Lakas–CMD	108,778	36.92
Arnold Azura	Independent	5,481	1.86
Total		294,652	100.00
Valid votes		294,652	95.18
Invalid/blank votes		14,927	4.82
Total votes		309,579	100.00
Registered voters/turnout		359,570	86.10
Independent gain from Lakas			
Source: Commission on Elections

== Leyte ==
=== 1st district ===
Incumbent Martin Romualdez of Lakas–CMD won re-election for a third term unopposed.

Candidate	Party	Votes	%
Martin Romualdez (incumbent)	Lakas–CMD	177,486	100.00
Total		177,486	100.00
Valid votes		177,486	62.54
Invalid/blank votes		106,318	37.46
Total votes		283,804	100.00
Registered voters/turnout		335,609	84.56
Lakas hold			
Source: Commission on Elections

=== 2nd district ===
Incumbent Lolita Javier of the Nacionalista Party ran for a third term.

Javier won re-election against Abet Hidalgo (Independent).

Candidate	Party	Votes	%
Lolita Javier (incumbent)	Nacionalista Party	177,875	80.03
Abet Hidalgo	Independent	44,387	19.97
Total		222,262	100.00
Valid votes		222,262	84.75
Invalid/blank votes		39,992	15.25
Total votes		262,254	100.00
Registered voters/turnout		305,526	85.84
Nacionalista hold			
Source: Commission on Elections

=== 3rd district ===
Incumbent Anna Veloso-Tuazon of the National Unity Party ran for a second term.

Veloso-Tuazon won re-election against Wingwing Veloso (Partido Federal ng Pilipinas).

Candidate	Party	Votes	%
Anna Veloso-Tuazon (incumbent)	National Unity Party	57,303	53.47
Wingwing Veloso	Partido Federal ng Pilipinas	49,861	46.53
Total		107,164	100.00
Valid votes		107,164	91.29
Invalid/blank votes		10,226	8.71
Total votes		117,390	100.00
Registered voters/turnout		133,378	88.01
NUP hold			
Source: Commission on Elections

=== 4th district ===
Incumbent Richard Gomez of the Partido Federal ng Pilipinas ran for a second term. He was previously affiliated with PDP–Laban.

Gomez won re-election against former representative Ching Veloso (National Unity Party).

Candidate	Party	Votes	%
Richard Gomez (incumbent)	Partido Federal ng Pilipinas	172,483	56.94
Ching Veloso	National Unity Party	130,415	43.06
Total		302,898	100.00
Valid votes		302,898	97.23
Invalid/blank votes		8,625	2.77
Total votes		311,523	100.00
Registered voters/turnout		353,329	88.17
PFP hold			
Source: Commission on Elections

=== 5th district ===
Incumbent Carl Cari of Lakas–CMD ran for a third term. He was previously affiliated with PDP–Laban.

Cari won the election against Levito Baligod (Independent).

Candidate	Party	Votes	%
Carl Cari (incumbent)	Lakas–CMD	154,025	75.94
Levito Baligod	Independent	48,806	24.06
Total		202,831	100.00
Valid votes		202,831	88.29
Invalid/blank votes		26,901	11.71
Total votes		229,732	100.00
Registered voters/turnout		273,212	84.09
Lakas hold			
Source: Commission on Elections

== Northern Samar ==
=== 1st district ===
Incumbent Paul Daza of the National Unity Party (NUP) retired.

The NUP nominated Daza's son, Niko Raul Daza, who won the election against Rod del Valle (Independent).

Candidate	Party	Votes	%
Niko Raul Daza	National Unity Party	141,867	89.25
Rod del Valle	Independent	17,090	10.75
Total		158,957	100.00
Valid votes		158,957	77.21
Invalid/blank votes		46,909	22.79
Total votes		205,866	100.00
Registered voters/turnout		253,112	81.33
NUP hold			
Source: Commission on Elections

=== 2nd district ===
Incumbent Harris Ongchuan] of the National Unity Party retired to run for governor of Northern Samar.

Ongchuan endorsed his cousin, Northern Samar governor Edwin Ongchuan (Partido Federal ng Pilipinas), who won the election against two other candidates.

Candidate	Party	Votes	%
Edwin Ongchuan	Partido Federal ng Pilipinas	96,304	85.06
Roselyn Capoquian	Aksyon Demokratiko	12,544	11.08
Enrico Caballa	Independent	4,365	3.86
Total		113,213	100.00
Valid votes		113,213	73.50
Invalid/blank votes		40,823	26.50
Total votes		154,036	100.00
Registered voters/turnout		196,079	78.56
PFP gain from NUP			
Source: Commission on Elections

== Samar ==
=== 1st district ===
Incumbent Stephen James Tan of the Nacionalista Party won re-election for a second term unopposed.

Candidate	Party	Votes	%
Stephen James Tan (incumbent)	Nacionalista Party	203,330	100.00
Total		203,330	100.00
Valid votes		203,330	88.59
Invalid/blank votes		26,189	11.41
Total votes		229,519	100.00
Registered voters/turnout		289,756	79.21
Nacionalista hold			
Source: Commission on Elections

=== 2nd district ===
Incumbent Reynolds Michael Tan of Lakas–CMD won re-election for a second term unopposed. He was previously affiliated with the Nacionalista Party.

Candidate	Party	Votes	%
Reynolds Michael Tan (incumbent)	Lakas–CMD	219,640	100.00
Total		219,640	100.00
Valid votes		219,640	80.24
Invalid/blank votes		54,080	19.76
Total votes		273,720	100.00
Registered voters/turnout		335,787	81.52
Lakas hold			
Source: Commission on Elections

== Southern Leyte ==
=== 1st district ===
Incumbent Luz Mercado of Lakas–CMD retired to run for mayor of Maasin.

Mercado endorsed her husband, former Secretary of Public Works and Highways Roger Mercado (Nationalist People's Coalition), who won the election against two other candidates.

Candidate	Party	Votes	%
Roger Mercado	Nationalist People's Coalition	68,306	68.62
Marisa Lerias	Katipunan ng Nagkakaisang Pilipino	29,109	29.24
Oscar Camus	Independent	2,122	2.13
Total		99,537	100.00
Valid votes		99,537	83.79
Invalid/blank votes		19,255	16.21
Total votes		118,792	100.00
Registered voters/turnout		134,738	88.17
NPC gain from Lakas			
Source: Commission on Elections

=== 2nd district ===
Incumbent Christopherson Yap of Lakas–CMD ran for a second term. He was previously affiliated with PDP–Laban.

Yap won the election against Emie Tan (Independent).

Candidate	Party	Votes	%
Christopherson Yap (incumbent)	Lakas–CMD	74,505	52.18
Emie Tan	Independent	68,288	47.82
Total		142,793	100.00
Valid votes		142,793	96.51
Invalid/blank votes		5,158	3.49
Total votes		147,951	100.00
Registered voters/turnout		165,267	89.52
Lakas hold			
Source: Commission on Elections
