= Tabango =

Municipality in Leyte, Philippines

- Municipality
- Municipality of Tabango
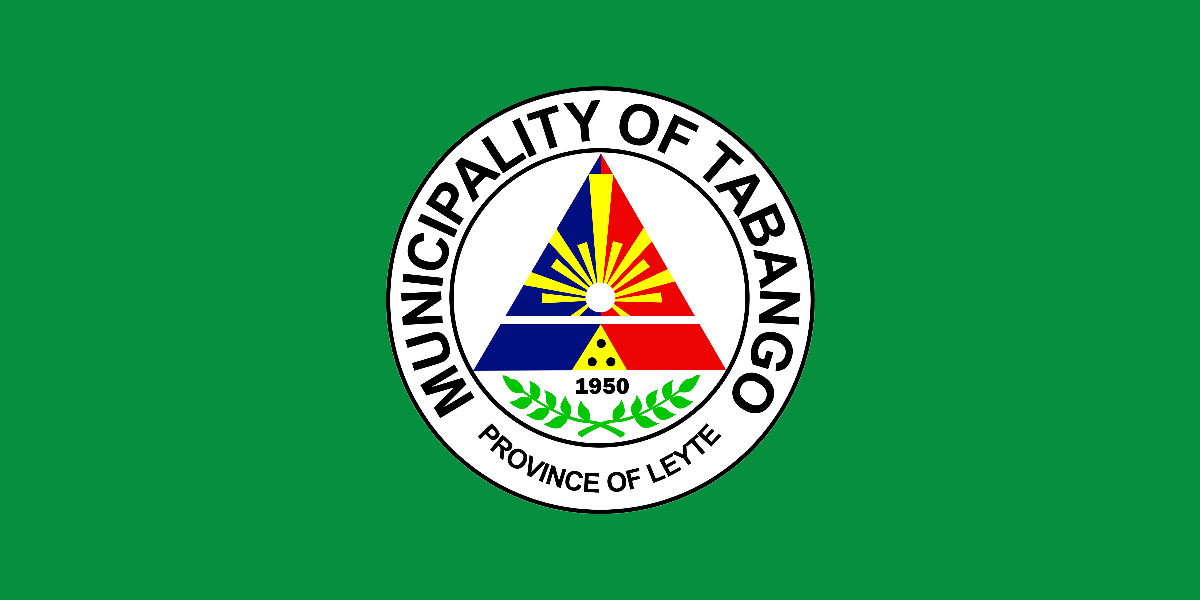
- Flag

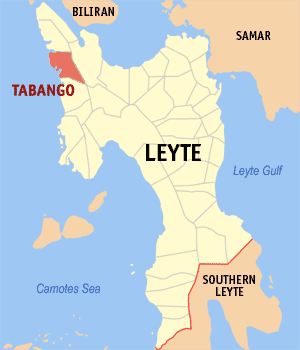
- Map of Leyte with Tabango highlighted
- Interactive map of Tabango
- Location within the Philippines
- Coordinates: 11°18′24″N 124°22′17″E
- Country: Philippines
- Region: Eastern Visayas
- Province: Leyte
- District: 3rd district
- Barangays: 13 (see Barangays)

Government
  - Type: Sangguniang Bayan
  - Mayor: Ma. Corazon "Maricor" E. Remandaban
  - Vice Mayor: Bernard Jonathan "Benjo" M. Remandaban
  - Representative: Anna Victoria V. Tuazon
  - Councilors: List: • Kirsty V. Jabonete; • Joel M. Majait; • Uldarico P. Comendador; • Willy D. Baring; • Herbert V. Manriquez; • Hebe D. Suano; • Danilo V. Dilidili; • Richard V. Merontos; DILG Masterlist of Officials
  - Electorate: 25,637 voters (2025)

Area
  - Total: 96.62 km^{2} (37.31 sq mi)
- Elevation: 31 m (102 ft)
- Highest elevation: 598 m (1,962 ft)
- Lowest elevation: 0 m (0 ft)

Population (2024 census)
  - Total: 33,888
  - Density: 350.7/km^{2} (908.4/sq mi)
  - Households: 8,345

Economy
  - Income class: 3rd municipal income class
  - Poverty incidence: 37.32% (2023)
  - Revenue: ₱ 162.3 million (2024)
  - Assets: ₱ 820.4 million (2024)
  - Expenditure: ₱ 219.1 million (2024)
  - Liabilities: ₱ 350 million (2024)

Service provider
  - Electricity: Leyte 5 Electric Cooperative (LEYECO 5)
- Time zone: UTC+8 (PST)
- ZIP code: 6536
- PSGC: 0803745000
- IDD : area code: +63 (0)53
- Native languages: Cebuano; Tagalog

Tabango, officially the Municipality of Tabango (Cebuano: Lungsod sa Tabango; Waray: Bungto han Tabango; Tagalog: Bayan ng Tabango), is a municipality in the province of Leyte, Philippines. According to the 2024 census, it has a population of 33,888 people.

Tabango, with annual income of P 34 million, has 13 barangays (villages), with 26 elementary schools, 4 high schools and one satellite school, the Palompon Institute of Technology.

== Etymology ==
Tabango was originally a barrio named Tandaya. Most of its inhabitants lived near the seashore. One day, a man living in the barrio went to catch some crabs as swamps surrounded the place and crabs were abundant. Although he was an expert in catching crabs, he was accidentally bitten by a big one. A Spanish soldier happened to be near the place where the man was, so he came near and asked for the name of the place. The man bitten by the crab looked up and saw the soldier. Feeling the pain caused by the biting of the crab, he cried, “ Tabang mo,” which means help me. The soldier, thinking it was the name of then place, said, “ Ah, Tabango. “ The soldier repeated the word Tabango to his superiors and from that time on, the settlement was called Tabango. When the barrio was created a municipality, it retained its name.

== History ==
In 1957 the sitios of Gibacungan, Catmon and Manlawa-an were converted into barrios.

On January 17, 2008, Tabango Mayor Bernard Jonathan Remandaban opened (soft) the almost complete P 5.8 million modern, fully air-conditioned library: “It took us 6 years to construct our municipal library.” The library can accommodate 20,000 books, has 5 computer units with Internet access and a flat television set that only carries the National Geographic and Discovery Channels. Students can use the computers for 10 hours monthly, free of charge.

Tabango was a barrio of San Isidro, Leyte. Its early settlers came from the islands of Cebu and Bohol and from the towns of Villaba and Palompon. Later as the transportation improved same personage from the eastern side of Leyte Province found fortune in the place. These people were responsible in molding its culture.

During the Second World War, the Barrio of Tabango was made the seat of the Civil Government of the Municipality of San Isidro, Leyte, the civil authorities returned the seat of the Local Government to the Población of San Isidro, Leyte

In 1948, prominent residents of Tabango, took the opportunity offered by the late Jose L. Alvarez to work out in Manila thru Senate President Mariano Jesus Cuenco, the establishment of a new political unit. Documentation were initiated with the assistance of the Late Rosendo Homerez of Tacloban City, whose wife was native of Tugas, now a barangay of Tabango. Eventually, Executive Order No. 284 was signed by President Elpidio Quirino on October 15, 1949, creating the Municipality of Tabango, Leyte. The first set of officials were appointed and sworn to office on January 16, 1950, to wit: Francisco Pastor (Municipal Mayor); Felomino Ocubillo (Municipal Vice Mayor); Adolfo Alvarez, Honofre Damayo, Potenciano Pijo, Mauricio Sevilles, Mateo Pastor (Councilmen).

The doctrine in the case of Pelaez vs. the Auditor General, G.R. No. L-23825 promulgated on December 24, 1965, placed the Municipality of Tabango in a great dilemma. It was in this case that the Supreme Court ruled and declared certain orders creating municipalities unconstitutional on the ground that the creation of municipalities is an exercise of the legislative power. On this premise, creation and exercise of the Municipality of Tabango, Leyte was illegal. However, the cloud that darkened the juridical personality of Tabango as a municipal corporation disappeared with the introduction of House Bill No. 2042 during the seventh congress by the Congressman Marcelino R. Veloso, Representative of the 3rd District Leyte. The bill proposed to create the municipalities of Almeria, Cabucgayan, Tabango and Culaba, with retroactive effect in order to validate the existence of the aforementioned municipal corporations. The bill was finally approved into law on June 17, 1972, as Republic Act 6488 retroactive on October 15, 1949.

== Geography ==
=== Barangays ===
Tabango is politically subdivided into 13 barangays. Each barangay consists of puroks and some have sitios.

- Butason I
- Butason II
- Campokpok
- Catmon
- Gimarco
- Gibacungan
- Inangatan
- Manlawaan
- Omaganhan
- Poblacion
- Santa Rosa
- Tabing
- Tugas

=== Climate ===
Climate data for Tabango, Leyte
Month	Jan	Feb	Mar	Apr	May	Jun	Jul	Aug	Sep	Oct	Nov	Dec	Year
Mean daily maximum °C (°F)	28 (82)	29 (84)	29 (84)	31 (88)	31 (88)	30 (86)	30 (86)	30 (86)	30 (86)	29 (84)	29 (84)	29 (84)	30 (85)
Mean daily minimum °C (°F)	22 (72)	22 (72)	22 (72)	23 (73)	24 (75)	25 (77)	25 (77)	25 (77)	25 (77)	24 (75)	24 (75)	23 (73)	24 (75)
Average precipitation mm (inches)	73 (2.9)	56 (2.2)	75 (3.0)	71 (2.8)	114 (4.5)	174 (6.9)	172 (6.8)	163 (6.4)	167 (6.6)	161 (6.3)	158 (6.2)	125 (4.9)	1,509 (59.5)
Average rainy days	15.2	12.5	16.2	17.3	23.9	27.3	28.4	26.9	26.9	27.1	23.8	19.3	264.8
Source: Meteoblue

== Demographics ==
Population census of Tabango

Year	Pop.	±% p.a.
1903	3,537	—
1960	22,999	+3.34%
1970	25,383	+0.99%
1975	25,917	+0.42%
1980	29,384	+2.54%
1990	29,743	+0.12%
1995	31,837	+1.28%

Year	Pop.	±% p.a.
2000	31,433	−0.27%
2007	30,503	−0.41%
2010	31,932	+1.68%
2015	34,195	+1.31%
2020	33,868	−0.20%
2024	33,888	+0.01%

Source: Philippine Statistics Authority

In the 2024 census, the population of Tabango was 33,888 people, with a density of 350 inhabitants per square kilometre or 910 inhabitants per square mile.

== Economy ==
Poverty incidence of Tabango (%)

Source: Philippine Statistics Authority

== Tourism ==
Among sites that is visited by tourist are:

- Marcelo Beach Resort - the most beautiful beach that has white sand and is located at Sitio Pang-Pang, Sta. Rosa, Tabango, Leyte
- Boho Beach - a very well known beach in Tabango which gives a peace of mind whenever you come.
- San Vicente Ferrer Pilgrimage Site & Pangpang Cave - Said to be miraculous, pilgrims from all over the Philippines flock to this religious site to pray, give thanks and pay homage.
- Ocean Pearl Cove Resort - Belt out a song at any of the three Videoke Bars, jet ski to the sunset, experience the thrill of the banana boat ride, speedboat or pedal boat to an adjacent island, loll out on floating cottages, frolic in the swimming pool, relax in luxurious digs, and enjoy sumptuous meals and exotic drinks from the restaurant and the bar.
- Dawahon Isle - A rocky promontory of secluded alcoves, tiny white beaches and crystal clear waters teeming with spectacular and colorful marine life.
- Sunset Canturaw - Highest peak hereabouts, landmark for fishermen at sea, with a 500-step climb to the site of the Tabango Observatory Point Summit (TOPS).

== Government ==
=== Elected Officials ===
2025-2028 Tabango, Leyte Officials
Position	Name	Party
Mayor	Ma. Corazon E. Remandaban	PFP
Vice Mayor	Bernard Jonathan M. Remandaban	Aksyon
Councilors	Jose Welson G. Vosotros	Aksyon
Councilors	Elias M. Lequin Jr.	NUP
Councilors	Richard V. Merontos	PFP
Councilors	Richie O. Ocubillo	NUP
Councilors	Danilo V. Dilidili	NUP
Councilors	Joel M. Majait	Aksyon
Councilors	Melchor M. Aropo Jr.	NUP
Councilors	Joel Erme E. Robles	PFP
Ex Officio Municipal Council Members
ABC President	TBD	Nonpartisan
SK Federation President	TBD	Nonpartisan

== Education ==
Tabango has 26 elementary schools, 4 high schools and one satellite school, the Palompon Institute of Technology.

=== Primary and elementary schools ===
- Butason I Elementary School
- Butason II Primary School
- Campokpok Central School
- Catmon Elementary School
- Colonia Elementary School
- Don Bernardo Elementary School
- Gibacungan Elementary School
- Gimarco Elementary School
- Inangatan Elementary School
- Kawayan Elementary School
- Leon-ito Elementary School
- Leoncio Erejer Memorial Elementary School
- Manlawaan Elementary School
- Omaganhan Elementary School
- Pining Paglingap Elementary School
- Santa Rosa Elementary School
- Tabango North Central School
- Tabayla Elementary School
- Tabing Elementary School
- Tahad Primary School
- Tugas Elementary School
- Ybanez Elementary School

=== Secondary schools ===
- Gibacungan National High School
- Marcelino R. Veloso National High School (Marcelino R. Veloso National High School)
- Pastor Salazar National High School
- Tabango National High School

=== Technical and vocational school ===
- Palompon Institute of Technology-Tabango Campus
