= Pintuyan =

Municipality in Southern Leyte, Philippines

- Municipality
- Municipality of Pintuyan
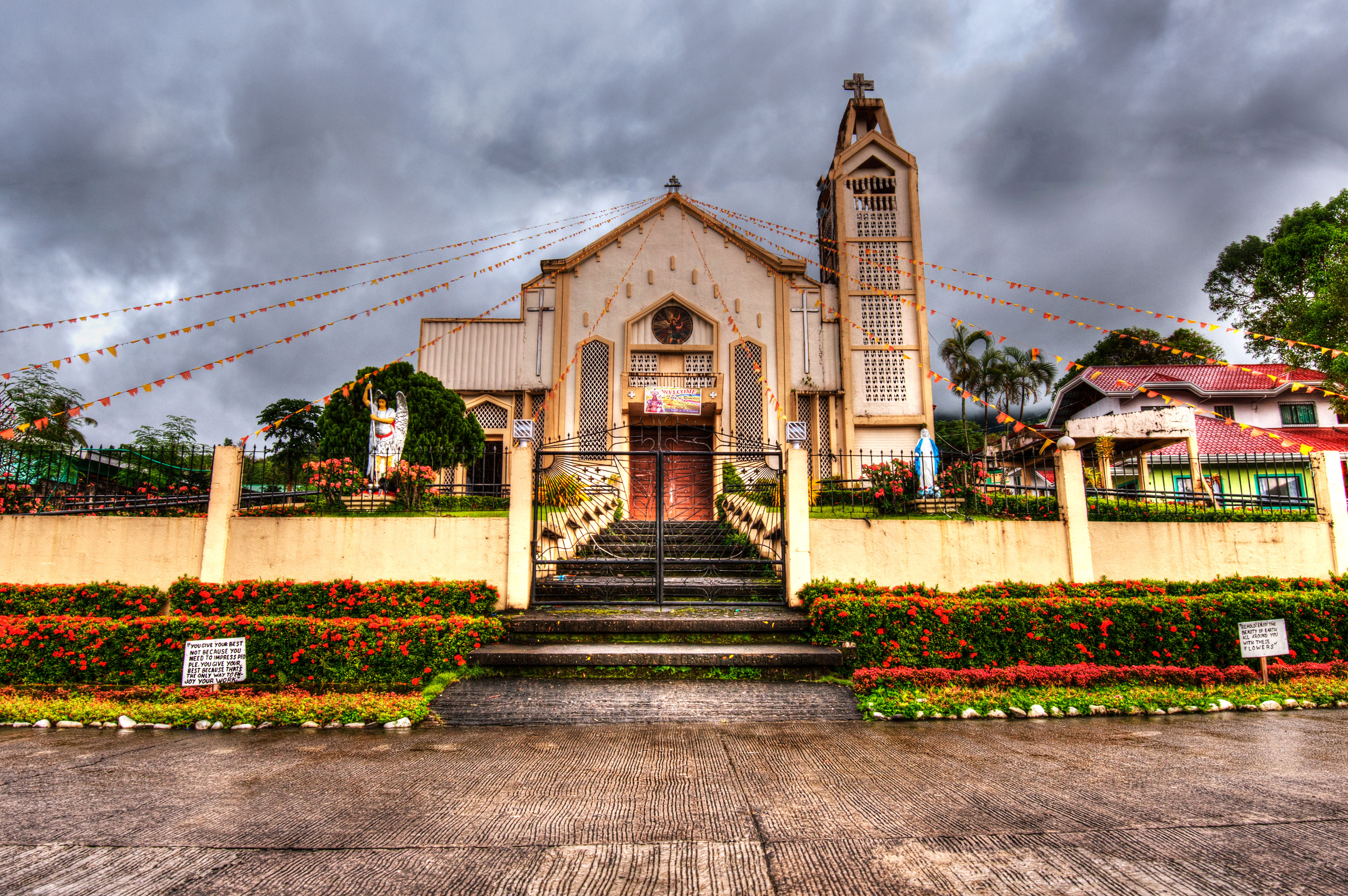
- St. Michael The Archangel Parish Church

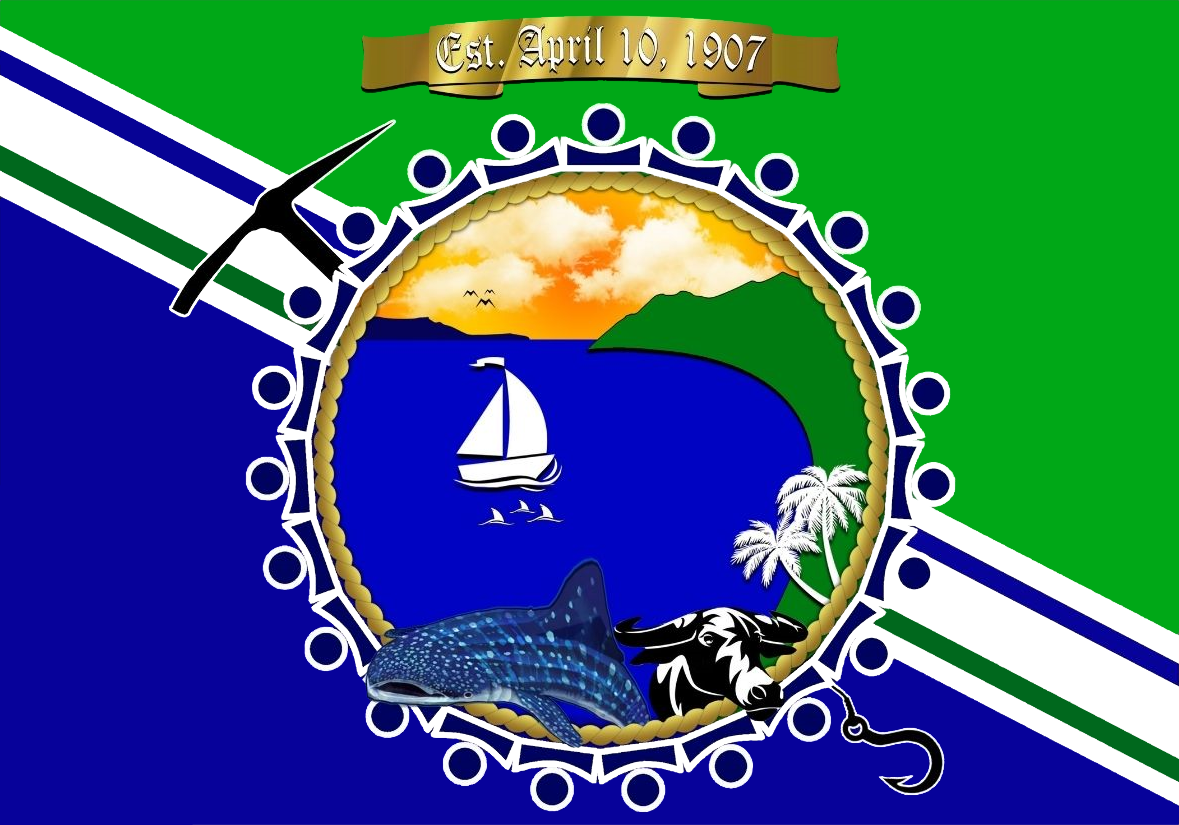
- Flag

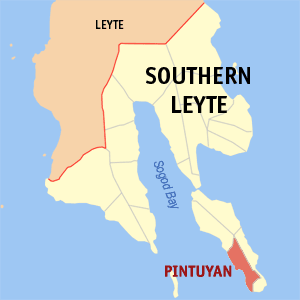
- Map of Southern Leyte with Pintuyan highlighted
- Interactive map of Pintuyan
- Location within the Philippines
- Coordinates: 9°57′N 125°15′E
- Country: Philippines
- Region: Eastern Visayas
- Province: Southern Leyte
- District: 2nd district
- Founded: 1865
- Barangays: 23 (see Barangays)

Government
  - Type: Sangguniang Bayan
  - Mayor: Ricarte A. Estrella (PDPLBN)
  - Vice Mayor: Anna Liza V. Salinas (PDPLBN)
  - Representative: Christopherson M. Yap
  - Municipal Council: Members: Roberto C. Herrera; Roslyn A. Ong; Archie T. Asuncion; Alicia A. Neri; Isidro V. Dotarot; Franito T. Amoncio; Rodrigo C. Amper; Lucena D. Damolo
  - Electorate: 8,456 voters (2025)

Area
  - Total: 36.98 km^{2} (14.28 sq mi)
- Elevation: 97 m (318 ft)
- Highest elevation: 708 m (2,323 ft)
- Lowest elevation: 0 m (0 ft)

Population (2024 census)
  - Total: 10,930
  - Density: 295.6/km^{2} (765.5/sq mi)
  - Households: 2,488

Economy
  - Income class: 5th municipal income class
  - Poverty incidence: 17.94% (2023)
  - Revenue: ₱ 8.279 million (2024)
  - Assets: ₱ 304.3 million (2024)
  - Expenditure: ₱ 95.02 million (2024)
  - Liabilities: ₱ 82.41 million (2024)

Service provider
  - Electricity: Southern Leyte Electric Cooperative (SOLECO)
- Time zone: UTC+8 (PST)
- ZIP code: 6614
- PSGC: 0806411000
- IDD : area code: +63 (0)53
- Native languages: Boholano dialect Cebuano; Tagalog
- Website: www.pintuyan-sleyte.gov.ph

Pintuyan, officially the Municipality of Pintuyan (Cebuano: Lungsod sa Pintuyan; Tagalog: Bayan ng Pintuyan), is a municipality in the province of Southern Leyte, Philippines. According to the 2024 census, it has a population of 10,930 people.

== History ==
Pintuyan was established in 1865. During the American period, the seat of Pintuyan was moved to Pintuyan from San Ricardo, upon the election of Perfecto Vazquez as Municipal President. Residents of San Ricardo petitioned for a separate municipality. San Ricardo became its own municipality, when Executive Order No. 194 was signed on October 24, 1965, separating 16 eastern barrios from Pintuyan.

== Geography ==
The town's coastal waters are part of the Panaon Island Protected Seascape.

=== Barangays ===
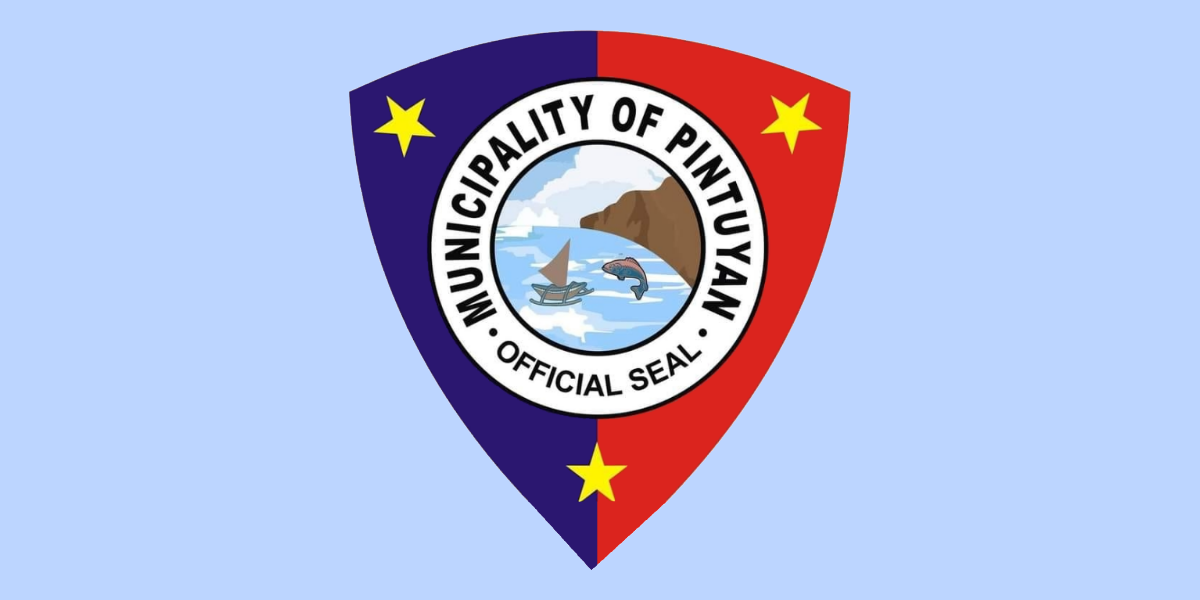
Former flag of Pintuyan, used until 2022

Pintuyan is politically subdivided into a total of 23 barangays. Each barangay consists of puroks and some have sitios.

- Nueva Estrella Norte
- Nueva Estrella Sur
- Dan-an
- Catbawan
- Manglit
- Son-ok I
- Son-ok II
- Caubang
- Ponod
- Poblacion Ibabao
- Poblacion Ubos
- Buenavista
- Badiang
- Balongbalong
- Bulawan
- Canlawis
- Cogon
- Lobo
- Mainit
- Tautag
- Ponciano D. Equipilag
- San Roque
- Santa Cruz

=== Climate ===
Climate data for Pintuyan, Southern Leyte
Month	Jan	Feb	Mar	Apr	May	Jun	Jul	Aug	Sep	Oct	Nov	Dec	Year
Mean daily maximum °C (°F)	27 (81)	27 (81)	28 (82)	29 (84)	30 (86)	29 (84)	29 (84)	29 (84)	30 (86)	29 (84)	29 (84)	28 (82)	29 (84)
Mean daily minimum °C (°F)	23 (73)	23 (73)	23 (73)	23 (73)	25 (77)	25 (77)	25 (77)	25 (77)	25 (77)	25 (77)	24 (75)	24 (75)	24 (75)
Average precipitation mm (inches)	210 (8.3)	161 (6.3)	123 (4.8)	85 (3.3)	148 (5.8)	186 (7.3)	164 (6.5)	157 (6.2)	141 (5.6)	190 (7.5)	223 (8.8)	200 (7.9)	1,988 (78.3)
Average rainy days	21.0	16.8	18.5	18.2	24.9	27.7	28.4	27.0	26.1	27.6	24.6	22.0	282.8
Source: Meteoblue

== Demographics ==
Population census of Pintuyan
Year	Pop.	±% p.a.
1903	4,291	—
1918	7,850	+4.11%
1939	10,400	+1.35%
1948	11,167	+0.79%
1960	11,445	+0.21%
1970	12,534	+0.91%
1975	7,446	−9.92%
1980	7,872	+1.12%
1990	8,177	+0.38%
1995	8,388	+0.48%
2000	9,567	+2.86%
2007	9,911	+0.49%
2010	9,261	−2.44%
2015	9,826	+1.13%
2020	10,202	+0.79%
2024	10,930	+1.67%
Source: Philippine Statistics Authority

== Economy ==
Poverty incidence of Pintuyan (%)

Source: Philippine Statistics Authority
