= Anahawan =

Municipality in Southern Leyte, Philippines

- Municipality
- Municipality of Anahawan
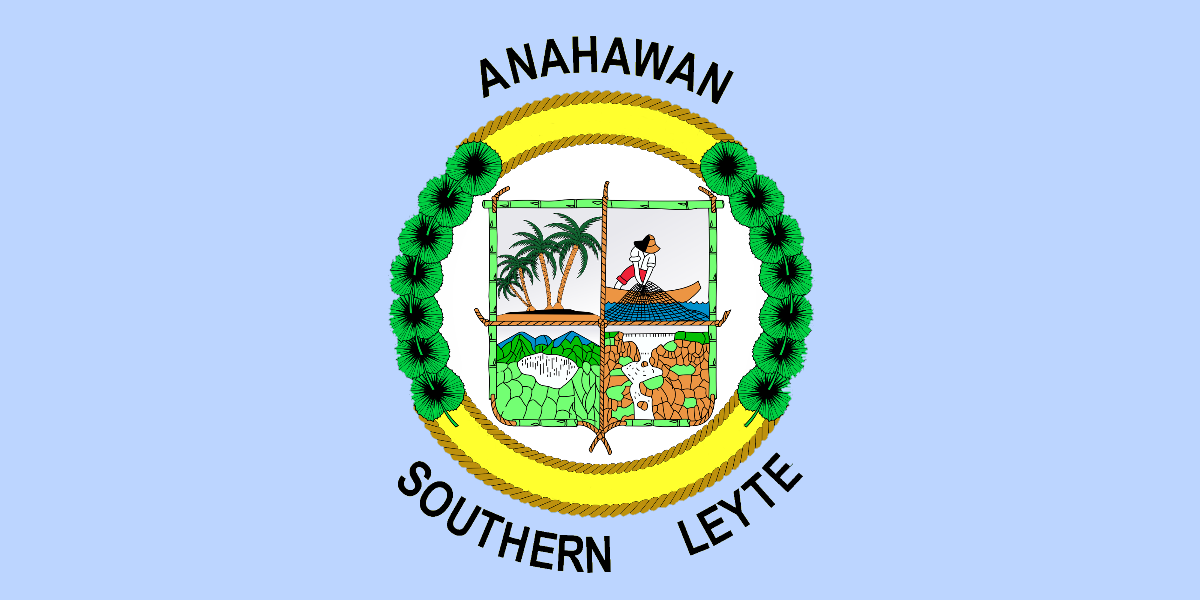
- Flag Seal

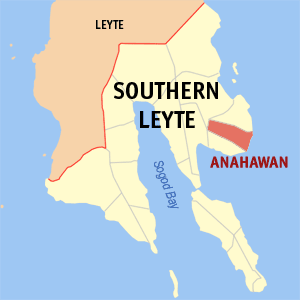
- Map of Southern Leyte with Anahawan highlighted
- Interactive map of Anahawan
- Location within the Philippines
- Coordinates: 10°16′27″N 125°15′30″E
- Country: Philippines
- Region: Eastern Visayas
- Province: Southern Leyte
- District: 2nd district
- Founded: 1930
- Barangays: 14 (see Barangays)

Government
  - Type: Sangguniang Bayan
  - Mayor: Alfredo N. Luna Jr. (Aksyon)
  - Vice Mayor: Nestor B. Vestal (Aksyon)
  - Representative: Christopherson M. Yap
  - Municipal Council: Members: Rex L. Sales; Marlyn M. Armonia; Federico L. Lambonao Jr.; Lolito M. Gunda; Diego A. Loquinte; Mara G. Pabon; Reinario S. Behare; Pretzelito T. Timbang
  - Electorate: 6,411 voters (2025)

Area
  - Total: 58.09 km^{2} (22.43 sq mi)
- Elevation: 96 m (315 ft)
- Highest elevation: 928 m (3,045 ft)
- Lowest elevation: 0 m (0 ft)

Population (2024 census)
  - Total: 8,766
  - Density: 150.9/km^{2} (390.8/sq mi)
  - Households: 1,988

Economy
  - Income class: 5th municipal income class
  - Poverty incidence: 18.47% (2023)
  - Revenue: ₱ 5.654 million (2024)
  - Assets: ₱ 305.8 million (2024)
  - Expenditure: ₱ 73.15 million (2024)
  - Liabilities: ₱ 51.58 million (2024)

Service provider
  - Electricity: Southern Leyte Electric Cooperative (SOLECO)
- Time zone: UTC+8 (PST)
- ZIP code: 6610
- PSGC: 0806401000
- IDD : area code: +63 (0)53
- Native languages: Boholano dialect Cebuano; Tagalog
- Website: www.anahawan-sleyte.gov.ph

Anahawan, officially the Municipality of Anahawan (Kabalian: Lungsod san Anahawan; Cebuano: Lungsod sa Anahawan; Tagalog: Bayan ng Anahawan), is a municipality in the province of Southern Leyte, Philippines. According to the 2024 census, it has a population of 8,766 people.

== History ==
Originally, Anahawan was to be named as Delgado through Executive Order No. 219, issued by Governor-General Dwight F. Davis on December 2, 1929, which organized 22 barrios to be separated from Hinundayan. However, its organization only took effect on January 1, 1930. By Act No. 3705 dated November 20, Delgado was renamed Anahawan, which would be effective exactly a year after its establishment.

== Geography ==
=== Barangays ===
Anahawan is politically subdivided into 14 barangays. Each barangay consists of puroks and some have sitios.

- Amagusan
- Calintaan
- Canlabian
- Capacuhan
- Kagingkingan
- Lewing
- Lo-ok
- Mahalo
- Mainit
- Manigawong
- Poblacion
- San Vicente
- Tagup-on
- Cogon

=== Climate ===
Climate data for Anahawan, Southern Leyte
Month	Jan	Feb	Mar	Apr	May	Jun	Jul	Aug	Sep	Oct	Nov	Dec	Year
Mean daily maximum °C (°F)	28 (82)	29 (84)	29 (84)	30 (86)	30 (86)	30 (86)	29 (84)	29 (84)	29 (84)	29 (84)	29 (84)	29 (84)	29 (84)
Mean daily minimum °C (°F)	23 (73)	22 (72)	23 (73)	24 (75)	25 (77)	25 (77)	25 (77)	25 (77)	25 (77)	25 (77)	24 (75)	23 (73)	24 (75)
Average precipitation mm (inches)	78 (3.1)	57 (2.2)	84 (3.3)	79 (3.1)	118 (4.6)	181 (7.1)	178 (7.0)	169 (6.7)	172 (6.8)	180 (7.1)	174 (6.9)	128 (5.0)	1,598 (62.9)
Average rainy days	16.7	13.8	17.3	18.5	23.2	26.5	27.1	26.0	26.4	27.5	24.6	21.0	268.6
Source: Meteoblue

== Demographics ==
Population census of Anahawan
Year	Pop.	±% p.a.
1939	5,086	—
1948	4,703	−0.87%
1960	5,545	+1.38%
1970	6,094	+0.95%
1975	6,875	+2.45%
1980	6,544	−0.98%
1990	7,063	+0.77%
1995	6,471	−1.63%
2000	7,209	+2.34%
2007	8,032	+1.50%
2010	7,942	−0.41%
2015	8,211	+0.64%
2020	8,429	+0.55%
2024	8,766	+0.95%
Source: Philippine Statistics Authority.

== Economy ==
Poverty incidence of Anahawan

Source: Philippine Statistics Authority
