= Hinundayan =

Municipality in Southern Leyte, Philippines

- Municipality
- Municipality of Hinundayan
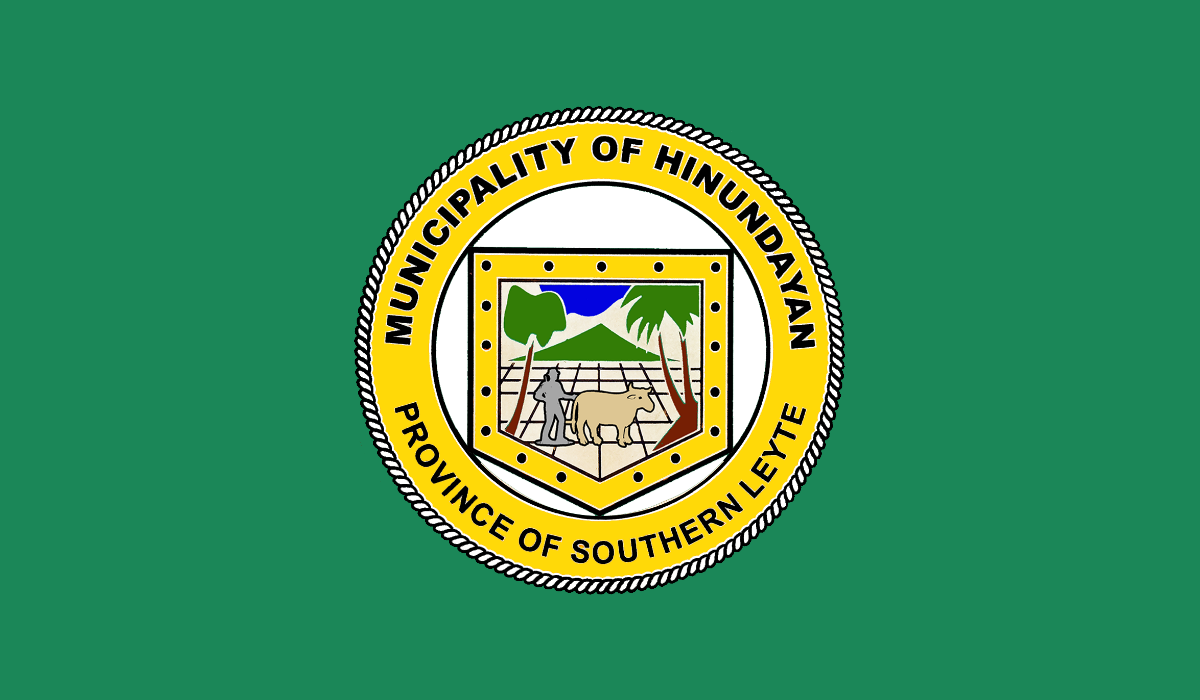
- Flag
- Motto: "Hinundayan can do!"
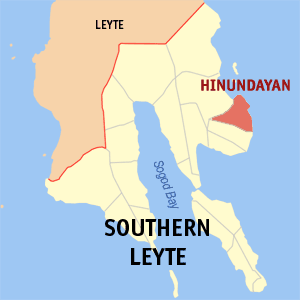
- Map of Southern Leyte with Hinundayan highlighted
- Interactive map of Hinundayan
- Location within the Philippines
- Coordinates: 10°21′N 125°15′E
- Country: Philippines
- Region: Eastern Visayas
- Province: Southern Leyte
- District: 2nd district
- Founded: March 21, 1876
- Barangays: 17 (see Barangays)

Government
  - Type: Sangguniang Bayan
  - Mayor: Evelyn T. Lee (NUP)
  - Vice Mayor: Edna A. Resma (NUP)
  - Representative: Christopherson Yap
  - Municipal Council: Members: Eva Almosa-Anryu; Ma. Editha T. Ramirez; Consuelo R. Dy; Lerma G. Lagumbay; Anna Febb B. Cazon; Jeanette M. Abuyog; Diana P. Palima; Crescente C. Pedrera
  - Electorate: 10,122 voters (2025)

Area
  - Total: 59.90 km^{2} (23.13 sq mi)
- Elevation: 46 m (151 ft)
- Highest elevation: 519 m (1,703 ft)
- Lowest elevation: −1 m (−3.3 ft)

Population (2024 census)
  - Total: 13,042
  - Density: 217.7/km^{2} (563.9/sq mi)
  - Households: 3,402

Economy
  - Income class: 4th municipal income class
  - Poverty incidence: 12.93% (2023)
  - Revenue: ₱ 103.1 million (2024)
  - Assets: ₱ 296.5 million (2024)
  - Expenditure: ₱ 85.58 million (2024)

Service provider
  - Electricity: Southern Leyte Electric Cooperative (SOLECO)
- Time zone: UTC+8 (PST)
- ZIP code: 6609
- PSGC: 0806404000
- IDD : area code: +63 (0)53
- Native languages: Boholano dialect Cebuano; Tagalog
- Website: www.hinundayan-sleyte.gov.ph

Hinundayan, officially the Municipality of Hinundayan (Kabalian: Lungsod san Hinundayan; Cebuano: Lungsod sa Hinundayan; Tagalog: Bayan ng Hinundayan), is a municipality in the province of Southern Leyte, Philippines. According to the Hinundayan has a total land area of 6,108 hectares or 61.08 square kilometers, comprising 17 barangays. 2024 census, it has a population of 13,042 people.

== Etymology ==
During the 17th century, there were Spanish sailors who arrived in Sabang. At that time, the residents set up a resting place (handayanan) for their outrigger canoes. These handayanan were made up of bamboo posts with horizontal rails which were a meter high from the ground where the canoes and other sea crafts were laid after use. When the Spanish sailors asked the residents what was the name of the place, the residents who did not understand Spanish thought that they were asked of what they were doing, so they answered in their own dialect, "handayanan among gibuhat para sa among baruto." The Spaniards noted the first word "Handayanan" as the name of the place, so they refer the place as such, which later on distorted into "Hinundayan".

== History ==
=== Foundation ===
Before Hinunangan became a town, this and Hinundayan were part of the town of Abuyog. But when it was created a town on the 18th century, Hinundayan was part of its jurisdiction.

On March 21, 1876, the Governor of Leyte Jose Fernandez issued an Executive Order proclaiming Hinundayan a separate town, the first “Kapitan Municipal” was Don Sotero Tobio. But its townhood lasted only until the Revolutionary Period. When the American came, it became a barrio of Hinunangan again. The “Kapitan Municipal” at that time was Don Luis Lagumbay.

Due to the petition of some concerned Hinundayanons, Executive Order No. 59 was issued on July 31, 1909, signed by Governor General William Cameron Forbes and Act No. 986 proclaiming Hinundayan a separate town from Hinunangan.

Hinundayan had its territory reduced when in 1929, Governor General Dwight F. Davis issued Executive Order No. 219 that organized the municipality of Delgado (renamed Anahawan in 1931), which took effect in the first day of 1930.

== Geography ==
=== Barangays ===
Hinundayan is politically subdivided into 17 barangays. Each barangay consists of puroks and some have sitios.

- Amaga
- Ambao
- An-an
- Baculod
- Biasong
- Bugho (Green Valley)
- Cabulisan
- Cat-iwing
- District I (Poblacion)
- District II (Poblacion)
- District III (Poblacion)
- Hubasan
- Lungsodaan
- Navalita
- Plaridel
- Sabang
- Sagbok

=== Climate ===
Climate data for Hinundayan, Southern Leyte
Month	Jan	Feb	Mar	Apr	May	Jun	Jul	Aug	Sep	Oct	Nov	Dec	Year
Mean daily maximum °C (°F)	28 (82)	29 (84)	29 (84)	30 (86)	30 (86)	30 (86)	29 (84)	29 (84)	29 (84)	29 (84)	29 (84)	29 (84)	29 (84)
Mean daily minimum °C (°F)	22 (72)	22 (72)	23 (73)	23 (73)	25 (77)	25 (77)	25 (77)	25 (77)	25 (77)	25 (77)	24 (75)	23 (73)	24 (75)
Average precipitation mm (inches)	78 (3.1)	57 (2.2)	84 (3.3)	79 (3.1)	118 (4.6)	181 (7.1)	178 (7.0)	169 (6.7)	172 (6.8)	180 (7.1)	174 (6.9)	128 (5.0)	1,598 (62.9)
Average rainy days	16.7	13.8	17.3	18.5	23.2	26.5	27.1	26.0	26.4	27.5	24.6	21.0	268.6
Source: Meteoblue

== Demographics ==
Population census of Hinundayan
Year	Pop.	±% p.a.
1903	5,547	—
1918	8,999	+3.28%
1939	6,830	−1.30%
1948	7,199	+0.59%
1960	7,088	−0.13%
1970	8,546	+1.89%
1975	9,225	+1.55%
1980	9,746	+1.10%
1990	9,965	+0.22%
1995	10,617	+1.19%
2000	11,113	+0.98%
2007	11,610	+0.61%
2010	11,890	+0.87%
2015	12,285	+0.62%
2020	12,398	+0.19%
2024	13,042	+1.22%
Source: Philippine Statistics Authority

Among the seventeen (17) barangays of the municipality, four (4) barangays are considered urban and the remaining thirteen (13) barangays are rural. Based on the Philippine Statistics Authority (NSO), 2007 Census of Population, the municipality's population is dispersed in the rural barangays with a total population count of 7,692 or 66% of the total population while the remaining 34% or the 3,918 population count is concentrated in the urban barangays.

== Economy ==
Poverty incidence of Hinundayan (%)

Source: Philippine Statistics Authority

== See also ==
- Naval Base Hinundayan
