= Florentino Peñaranda =

Filipino educator, legislator and politician (1876–1938)

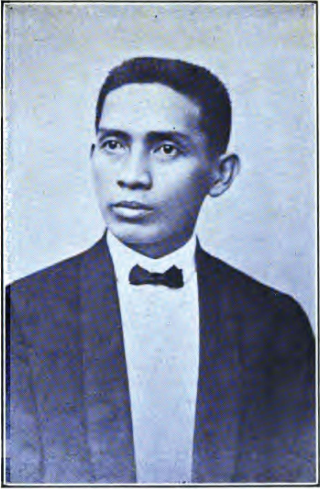
- Peñaranda, c. 1908

Member of the Philippine Assembly from Leyte's 3rd district
- In office 1907–1909
- Preceded by: Position established
- Succeeded by: Abdon Marchadesch

Personal details
- Born: June 18, 1876 Barugo, Leyte, Captaincy General of the Philippines
- Died: September 3, 1938 (aged 62) Barugo, Leyte, Philippine Commonwealth
- Party: Nacionalista
- Spouse: Francisca Panis Villasin
- Children: 9
- Profession: Educator, Legislator

Military service
- Branch/service: Philippine Revolutionary
- Years of service: 1899 - June 19, 1902
- Rank: Lieutenant (1899 - 1900); Colonel (1900 - 1901); Commander in the islands of Samar and Leyte (1901 - 1902); The last officer of Aguinaldo's Revolutionary army to surrender to American officers.
- Battles/wars: Philippine–American War

Florentino Peñaranda (June 18, 1876 – September 3, 1938) was a Filipino educator, legislator and politician in the province of Leyte. He was also an officer of the revolutionary forces in Samar and Leyte who fought for Philippine independence against the Americans. During peacetime, Peñaranda ran for elections and won a seat representing the 3rd district of Leyte in the First Philippine Assembly from 1907 to 1909.

== Brief profile ==
Peñaranda was born on June 18, 1876, in the town of Barugo, province of Leyte.

He studied at the Escuela Normal de San Francisco Xavier, a school ran by Spanish Jesuits in Ermita, Manila. After completing his studies, Peñaranda set up a school for children in his hometown and forthwith launched his career in teaching.

== Life as a Revolutionary ==
At 24, he was commander-in-chief of the Leyte revolutionary forces, by fate destined to articulate his command's firm resolve to hold fast to their commitment to continue the Filipino resistance against the American occupation of the Philippines at the turn of the 19th century.

It was in point of fact the last stand of the all-but-ended Philippine resistance movement that began to unravel when its initiator and prime mover General Emilio Aguinaldo, supreme commander of the Philippine revolutionary forces, was captured by the Americans in Palanan, Isabela in March 1901.

The saga of Leyte's little-known stand in the Philippine-American War had its beginning insofar as Peñaranda was concerned when he returned to Barugo after completing his studies in Manila.

Before long, however, Leyte's role in the resistance movement intensified. The Supreme General Command ordered General Vicente Lukban to focus his efforts on Samar and at the same time designated General Ambrosio Mojica as commander-in-chief of the Leyte Jefatura (Office of the Political-Military Chief).

Noting the shortage of combatants in his fledgling army, General Mojica closed down all the schools in Leyte and conscripted the able-bodied male students and teachers, among them Schoolmaster Peñaranda, to beef up his command. Mojica launched a guerilla campaign against the much-stronger and well-equipped enemy. It was largely a hit-and-run strategy. The capture of General Aguinaldo changed the long-range plan. Acting on orders from General Headquarters in connection with the need to speed up the pacification drive, General Mojica surrendered to the Americans on May 18, 1901. On the same date, he entrusted to Peñaranda the official papers and funds of the Jefatura.

Shortly thereafter General Lukban announced he was taking over command of the Leyte revolutionary forces. He designated Peñaranda as his assistant.

Whatever new surprises General Lukban had mapped out against the American war machine, all came to nothing with his capture by an American special force in his mountain hideout in Samar on February 19, 1902.

Lukban's capture plus the earlier capitulation of General Miguel Malvar, the last Filipino revolutionary general to surrender, were the two major setbacks that precipitately turned the Leyte revolutionary command into the lone holdout in the Filipino nation's resistance against the American occupation. Impartial foreign observers at the time were appalled by the savagery of the mismatch and had estimated that the lives of more than million Filipinos had been wasted at the hands of the US military.

Peñaranda was elected by his peers to take over the premier revolutionary post in Leyte province. As Commandante-en-Jefe or political-military chief, the 24-year-old Commandante Peñaranda understood clearly the burden of his command. He told his officers and men that the Leyte revolutionary command would hold fast to their commitment to continue the Filipino struggle against the American occupation of the Philippines until the United States Congress fulfilled its promise to enact legislation guaranteeing autonomy to the Philippines and the right of the Filipino people to self-government.

The Commander-in-chief's statement, otherwise known as the Peñaranda memorandum, was meant to remind the intruders that "superior people never make long visits." The Peñaranda memo didn't sit well with the Americans.

While they pressured their Filipino facilitator to work overtime and hammer out with Peñaranda's negotiator a mutually acceptable written agreement regarding the promised US legislation, at the same time they dispatched licensed assassins and snipers to take down Peñaranda, a move the commander-in-chief had anticipated.

Peñaranda and his personnel and a bodyguard of 60 crack riflemen had long moved quickly up the Baybay mountains and there had installed lookouts in well-concealed observation posts.

On June 19, 1902, Commandante Peñaranda and his men were fetched from their mountain hideout by his trusted comrade Captain de Veyra with the written agreement in hand and together they went down and then rendezvoused with thousands of their comrades-in-arms.

In a public ceremony Commandante Peñaranda addressed his officers and men and the Filipino nation at large. Commandante Peñaranda and his fellow soldiers then laid down their arms. Peñaranda's brief speech in Spanish was recorded in the Reseña de la Provincia de Leyte by historian-biographer Manuel C. Artigas.

== Contributions ==
=== Duties at the First Philippine Assembly or Philippine Legislature ===
In the wake of pacification and the significant changes that came after it, such as the establishment of the First Philippine Assembly (a unicameral legislature), Peñaranda ran for a seat in the Assembly and was elected representative of the Third District (now Second District) of Leyte in 1904.

At the First Philippine Assembly, Peñaranda was a member of various committees including agriculture, Civil Service, Navigation, and Provincial and Municipal Governments. He authored and took a leading role in the proposed enactment of laws on agriculture, trade, public instruction, preservation of Philippine sovereignty and protection of its territorial integrity, reduction of the budget, and the removal of unnecessary government agencies and bureaus.

== Electoral history ==
Historian and writer Manuel Artigas of the Federalista Party who was born in Panalaron, Tacloban also ran for the same seat for the 3rd District of Leyte but Artigas lost to Peñaranda.

== Personal life ==
Peñaranda was married to Francisca Panis Villasin, a native of Barugo with ancestral roots from Bantayan Island off Cebu. They had ten children, three boys and seven girls, one of whom died in her young years, Florentino Jr. (born in 1904), Sofia (1906), Francisco (1907), Maria Clara (1909), Aurora Maria (1910), Isidora (1912), Estela (1914), Alicia (1916), Elena (1919) and Benjamin (1923).

== Death and legacy ==
Peñaranda died on September 3, 1938.

A street is named in Peñaranda's honor in his birthplace, Barugo, as well as in the neighboring town of Tunga.
