= Leyte, Leyte =

Municipality in Leyte, Philippines

Leyte
- Municipality
- Municipality of Leyte
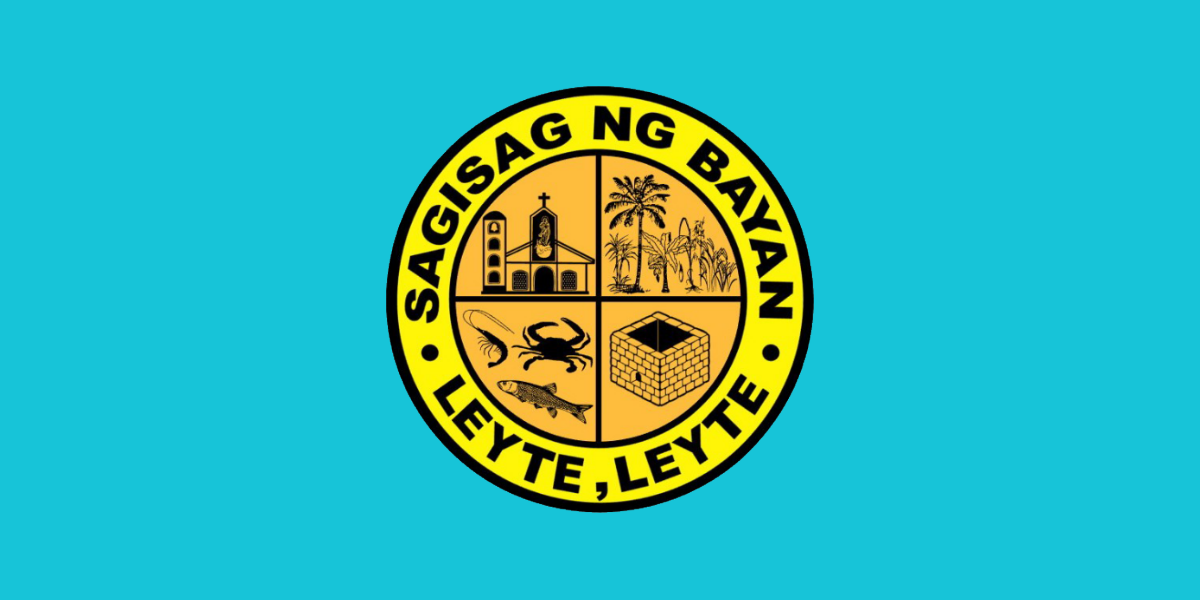
- Flag
- Nickname: "The Garden Town"
- Motto(s): Uswag Leyte, Leyte!
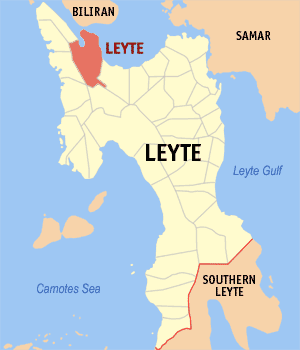
- Map of Leyte with Leyte highlighted
- Interactive map of Leyte
- Location within the Philippines
- Coordinates: 11°22′N 124°29′E
- Country: Philippines
- Region: Eastern Visayas
- Province: Leyte
- District: 3rd district
- Barangays: 30 (see Barangays)

Government
  - Type: Sangguniang Bayan
  - Mayor: Jed C. Granados (NUP)
  - Vice Mayor: Arnold James M. Ysidoro (Nacionalista)
  - Representative: Anna Victoria V. Tuazon
  - Councilors: List: • Asefa Gail G. Caña; • Lileth I. Gatchalian; • Pedro B. Panis; • Evelyn V. Cabardo; • Paquito D. Pelipel Jr.; • Charito T. Gato; • Rowil G. Batan; • Edward Jay A. Durante; DILG Masterlist of Officials
  - Electorate: 29,534 voters (2025)

Area
  - Total: 181.26 km^{2} (69.98 sq mi)
- Elevation: 55 m (180 ft)
- Highest elevation: 1,290 m (4,230 ft)
- Lowest elevation: 0 m (0 ft)

Population (2024 census)
  - Total: 40,622
  - Density: 224.11/km^{2} (580.44/sq mi)
  - Households: 9,452

Economy
  - Income class: 2nd municipal income class
  - Poverty incidence: 38.69% (2023)
  - Revenue: ₱ 198.6 million (2024)
  - Assets: ₱ 662.9 million (2024)
  - Expenditure: ₱ 249.1 million (2024)
  - Liabilities: ₱ 276.5 million (2024)

Service provider
  - Electricity: Leyte 5 Electric Cooperative (LEYECO 5)
- Time zone: UTC+8 (PST)
- ZIP code: 6533
- PSGC: 0803729000
- IDD : area code: +63 (0)53
- Native languages: Waray; Tagalog
- Website: http://leyteleyte.gov.ph/

Leyte (IPA: ['lɛɪte]), officially the Municipality of Leyte (Waray: Bungto han Leyte; Tagalog: Bayan ng Leyte), is a municipality in the province of Leyte, Philippines. According to the 2024 census, it has a population of 40,622 people.

== History ==
There are several versions as to how the place got its name. One of these relates that according to tradition, toward the west of the present town of Carigara, was a village ruled by Datu Ete. When the Augustinian Fathers heard of the region, they went to the place in order to Christianize the natives. They sailed by boat towards a small bay that swelled into a big river. Disembarking at a small village near the bank of the river, the friars asked the natives for direction. The natives, not knowing the language, answered, "Hira Ete" - which means, "the place belonged to Ete." The friars thought the natives meant that the name of the place was called Hiraete, hence their communications with their superiors referred to the place as Hiraite.

== Geography ==
=== Barangays ===
Leyte is politically subdivided into 30 barangays. Each barangay consists of puroks and some have sitios.

- Bachao
- Baco
- Bagaba-o
- Basud
- Belen
- Burabod
- Calaguise
- Consuegra
- Culasi
- Danus
- Elizabeth
- Kawayan
- Libas
- Maanda
- Macupa
- Mataloto
- Palarao
- Palid I (Ilawod)
- Palid II (Iraya)
- Parasan
- Poblacion
- Salog
- Sambulawan
- Tag-abaca
- Tapol
- Tigbawan
- Tinocdugan
- Toctoc
- Ugbon
- Wague

=== Climate ===
Climate data for Leyte, Leyte
Month	Jan	Feb	Mar	Apr	May	Jun	Jul	Aug	Sep	Oct	Nov	Dec	Year
Mean daily maximum °C (°F)	28 (82)	29 (84)	29 (84)	31 (88)	31 (88)	30 (86)	30 (86)	30 (86)	30 (86)	29 (84)	29 (84)	29 (84)	30 (85)
Mean daily minimum °C (°F)	23 (73)	22 (72)	22 (72)	23 (73)	24 (75)	25 (77)	25 (77)	25 (77)	25 (77)	24 (75)	24 (75)	23 (73)	24 (75)
Average precipitation mm (inches)	73 (2.9)	56 (2.2)	75 (3.0)	71 (2.8)	114 (4.5)	174 (6.9)	172 (6.8)	163 (6.4)	167 (6.6)	161 (6.3)	158 (6.2)	125 (4.9)	1,509 (59.5)
Average rainy days	15.2	12.5	16.2	17.3	23.9	27.3	28.4	26.9	26.9	27.1	23.8	19.3	264.8
Source: Meteoblue

== Demographics ==
Population census of Leyte

Year	Pop.	±% p.a.
1903	6,918	—
1918	11,214	+3.27%
1939	18,862	+2.51%
1948	20,559	+0.96%
1960	20,539	−0.01%
1970	23,670	+1.43%
1975	28,182	+3.56%
1980	29,288	+0.77%

Year	Pop.	±% p.a.
1990	32,575	+1.07%
1995	34,126	+0.88%
2000	35,241	+0.69%
2007	35,478	+0.09%
2010	37,505	+2.04%
2015	40,639	+1.54%
2020	40,397	−0.13%
2024	40,622	+0.13%

Source: Philippine Statistics Authority

In the 20204 census, the population of Leyte was 40,622 people, with a density of 220 inhabitants per square kilometre or 570 inhabitants per square mile.

== Economy ==
Poverty incidence of Leyte (%)

Source: Philippine Statistics Authority

== Elected Officials ==
2025-2028 Leyte, Leyte Officials
Position	Name	Party
Mayor	Jed C. Granados	NUP
Vice Mayor	Arnold James M. Ysidoro	Nacionalista
Councilors	Asefa Gail G. Caña	NUP
Councilors	Lileth I. Gatchalian	Nacionalista
Councilors	Pedro B. Panis	NUP
Councilors	Evelyn V. Cabardo	NUP
Councilors	Paquito D. Pelipel Jr.	PFP
Councilors	Charito T. Gato	NUP
Councilors	Rowil G. Batan	Nacionalista
Councilors	Edward Jay A. Durante	PFP
Ex Officio Municipal Council Members
ABC President	Jerry G. Apacible	Nonpartisan
SK Federation President	Nellie Grace D. Dandan	Nonpartisan
