= Libagon =

Municipality in Southern Leyte, Philippines

- Municipality
- Municipality of Libagon
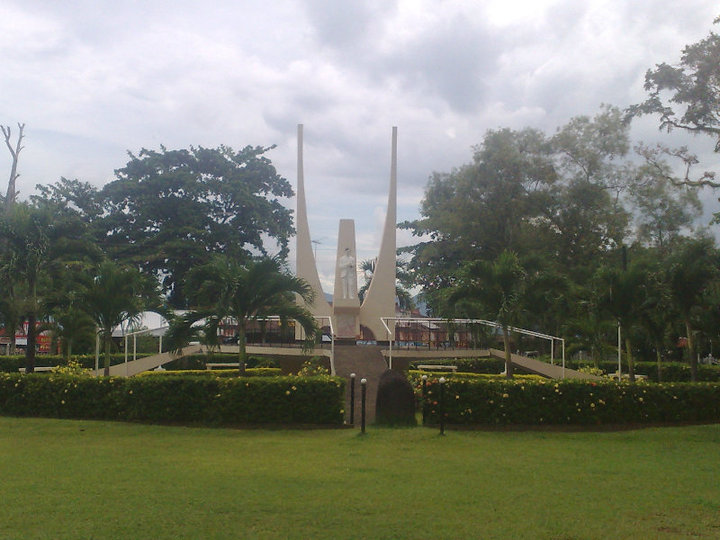
- Rizal Park of Libagon

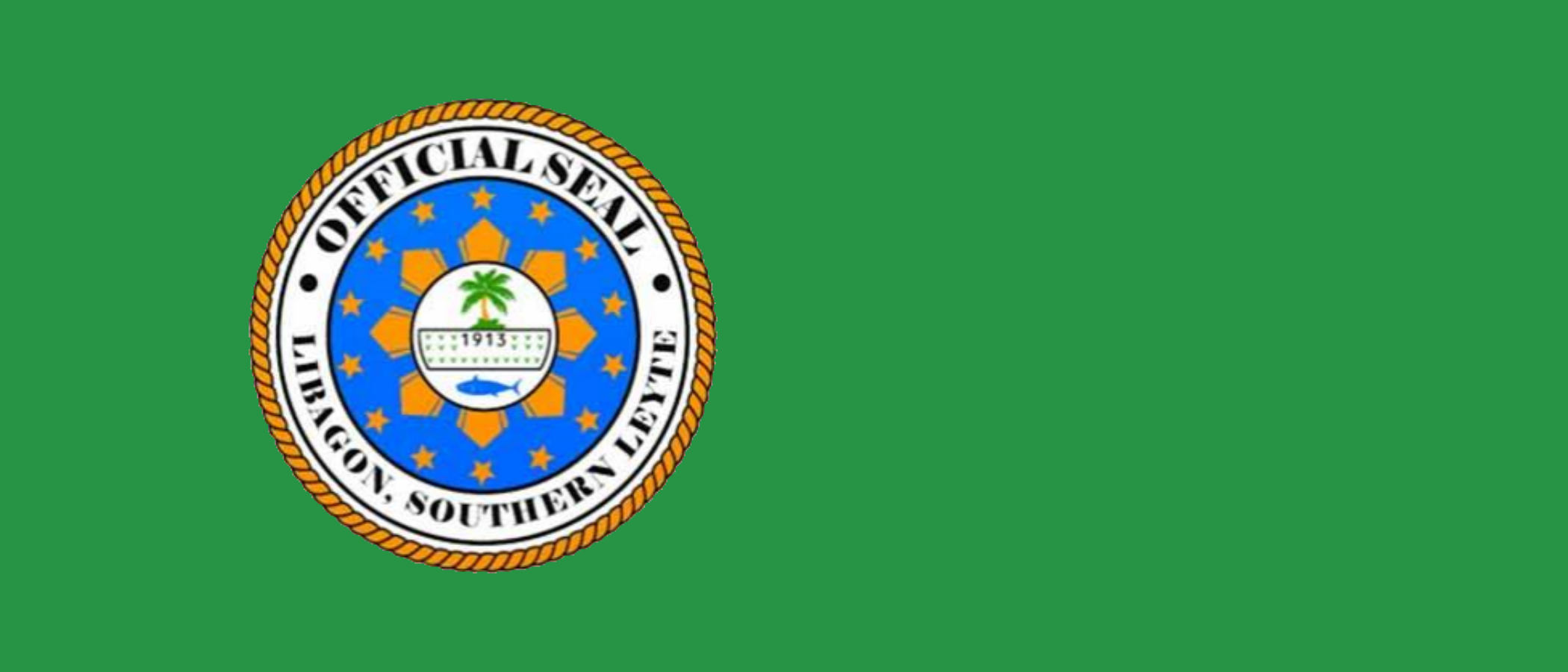
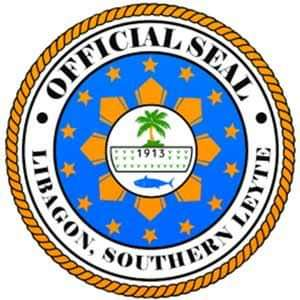
- Flag Seal
- Anthem: Libagon Hymn
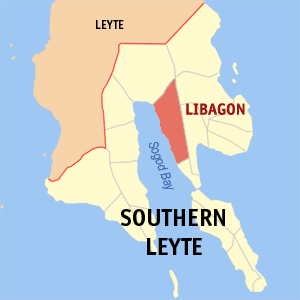
- Map of Southern Leyte with Libagon highlighted
- Interactive map of Libagon
- Location within the Philippines
- Coordinates: 10°18′N 125°03′E
- Country: Philippines
- Region: Eastern Visayas
- Province: Southern Leyte
- District: 2nd district
- Founded: 1913
- Barangays: 14 (see Barangays)

Government
  - Type: Sangguniang Bayan
  - Mayor: Oliver E. Ranque
  - Vice Mayor: Elizabeth L. Saldivar
  - Representative: Christopherson M. Yap
  - Municipal Council: Members: Concesa S. Arriola; Tomas T. Endico Jr.; Marvin A. Magaipo; Protacio C. Edillo; Mario Oliver B. Ranque; Edgar A. Peñaredondo; Dionesio B. Amparo Sr.; Sulficia C. Endriga
  - Electorate: 11,008 voters (2025)

Area
  - Total: 98.62 km^{2} (38.08 sq mi)
- Elevation: 150 m (490 ft)
- Highest elevation: 887 m (2,910 ft)
- Lowest elevation: 0 m (0 ft)

Population (2024 census)
  - Total: 16,146
  - Density: 163.7/km^{2} (424.0/sq mi)
  - Households: 3,560

Economy
  - Income class: 4th municipal income class
  - Poverty incidence: 19.91% (2023)
  - Revenue: ₱ 21.75 million (2024)
  - Assets: ₱ 404.8 million (2024)
  - Expenditure: ₱ 152.3 million (2024)
  - Liabilities: ₱ 72.8 million (2024)

Service provider
  - Electricity: Southern Leyte Electric Cooperative (SOLECO)
- Time zone: UTC+8 (PST)
- ZIP code: 6615
- PSGC: 0806405000
- IDD : area code: +63 (0)53
- Native languages: Boholano dialect Cebuano; Tagalog
- Website: www.libagon-sleyte.gov.ph

Libagon (Cebuano: Lungsod sa Libagon; Tagalog: Bayan ng Libagon) is a municipality in the province of Southern Leyte, Philippines. According to the 2024 census, it has a population of 16,146 people.

Every July 16 and December 8, Libagon celebrates two town festivals: the Feast of Our Lady of Mount Carmel and the Feast of the Immaculate Conception.

The main sources of income for Libagon residents include copra, abacá, agriculture, and fishing.

== Etymology ==
The name Libagon is derived from the Cebuano word libaong, meaning "small depression of the ground." Following their colonization of the region, the government of the Spanish Philippines mistakenly recorded the area's name as Libagon, and it has since been known as such.

== History ==
Archaeological and oral evidence suggests that immigrants from Bohol settled in Libagon in the late 18th century. In 1771, seventeen Boholano families established the visita of Libagon under the jurisdiction of Sogod.

Libagon was formally recognized as a barrio of Sogod in 1850. In March 1870, Governor Don Gabriel Ydjao transferred the town centre (poblacion) to Libagon and briefly renamed it Sogod Nuevo before the parish seat returned to Sogod in 1924.

During Gobernadorcillo Luis Espina’s term (1891–1893), the sitio of Maak was incorporated into the Consolacion barrio, and Libagon remained under Hipgasan visita. In 1885, Gobernadorcillo Nicolas Idjao reinstated Libagon as Sogod Nuevo and Sogod as Sogod Viejo. Several relocations of the municipal centers took place until 1912.

On October 16, 1913, Libagon and Sogod were separated into independent municipalities, with Libagon comprising fourteen barrios under the administration of Municipal President Mariano L. Espina.

== Geography ==
=== Barangays ===
Libagon is politically subdivided into 14 barangays (the Philippines' administrative divisions). Each barangay is further divided into puroks, and some have sitios.

- Biasong
- Bogasong
- Kawayan
- Gakat
- Jubas (Poblacion)
- Magkasag
- Mayuga
- Nahaong
- Nahulid
- Otikon
- Pangi
- Punta
- Talisay (Poblacion)
- Tigbao

=== Climate ===
Climate data for Libagon, Southern Leyte
Month	Jan	Feb	Mar	Apr	May	Jun	Jul	Aug	Sep	Oct	Nov	Dec	Year
Mean daily maximum °C (°F)	28 (82)	28 (82)	29 (84)	30 (86)	30 (86)	29 (84)	29 (84)	29 (84)	29 (84)	29 (84)	29 (84)	28 (82)	29 (84)
Mean daily minimum °C (°F)	22 (72)	22 (72)	22 (72)	23 (73)	24 (75)	25 (77)	25 (77)	25 (77)	25 (77)	24 (75)	24 (75)	23 (73)	24 (75)
Average precipitation mm (inches)	78 (3.1)	57 (2.2)	84 (3.3)	79 (3.1)	118 (4.6)	181 (7.1)	178 (7.0)	169 (6.7)	172 (6.8)	180 (7.1)	174 (6.9)	128 (5.0)	1,598 (62.9)
Average rainy days	16.7	13.8	17.3	18.5	23.2	26.5	27.1	26.0	26.4	27.5	24.6	21.0	268.6
Source: Meteoblue

== Demographics ==
Population census of Libagon
Year	Pop.	±% p.a.
1903	4,642	—
1918	5,719	+1.40%
1939	6,318	+0.48%
1948	7,173	+1.42%
1960	7,891	+0.80%
1970	9,231	+1.58%
1975	9,519	+0.62%
1980	10,516	+2.01%
1990	11,239	+0.67%
1995	10,754	−0.82%
2000	12,907	+3.99%
2007	14,283	+1.41%
2010	14,352	+0.18%
2015	15,169	+1.06%
2020	15,244	+0.10%
2024	16,146	+1.39%
Source: Philippine Statistics Authority

=== Language ===
The Cebuano language and Boholano dialect (Binol-anon) are commonly spoken in Libagon, with slight linguistic variations in form, meaning, or context. The Filipino language (standardized and codified form of the Tagalog Language) and English are taught in elementary and high school.

=== Religion ===
Libagonons (or Libagonians) are predominantly Christian, with the majority adherents of the Roman Catholic Church.

== Economy ==
Poverty incidence of Libagon (%)

Source: Philippine Statistics Authority

== Culture ==
=== Feasts ===
Libagon celebrates its annual fiesta on 8 December in honor of the Immaculate Conception, the town's patron saint and patroness of the Philippines. Local barangay feasts and Catholic holy days are observed throughout the year.

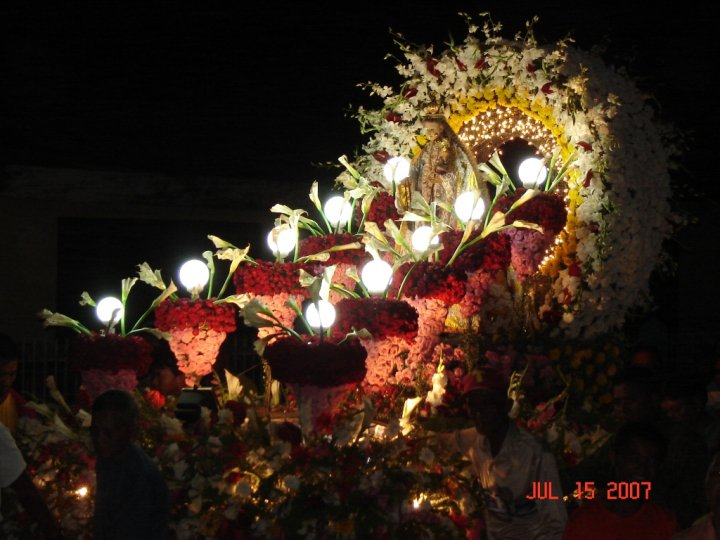
Caro floral decoration with Our Lady of Mount Carmel

The feast of Our Lady of Mount Carmel is celebrated on 16 July, followed by the traditional Pangilis ceremony on 17 July. The Pangilis (from the Visayan "ilis," meaning "change") begins at dawn with a bugle call known locally as "dayana" (from Spanish "diana," meaning reveille). The ceremony transfers the custody of the Our Lady of Mount Carmel statue from the outgoing hermano or hermana mayor to their successor for the following year's feast.

The celebration includes a street procession, traditional dancing, and the selection of annual "King and Queen" figures. Both December and July feasts feature decorated caro (carriages) bearing religious images, with floral arrangements adorning the carriages and the church altar.

=== The Parish of the Immaculate Conception ===
The original parish church and convent in Libagon were timber structures built by volunteer labour under the bayanihan tradition. Local hardwoods—including narra (Pterocarpus indicus), molave (Vitex parviflora), and white lauan (Shorea contorta)—were felled, hauled by rope, and hewn into beams and posts. Foundations comprised crushed stone and sand, with egg-white and lime mortar reinforcing the timber columns. Roof tiles were imported from Barcelona, Spain, and the belfry housed three cast bells audible across Sogod Bay.

The wooden church survived earthquakes, typhoons, and wartime fires until the invading and occupying Japanese forces destroyed it during World War II. It was subsequently rebuilt in a reduced-scale design, reusing salvageable materials where possible.

Padre Don Tomás Logroño of Inabanga, Bohol, served as the first parish priest from June 1870 to April 1882, overseeing the church's early construction and furnishing.

== Government ==
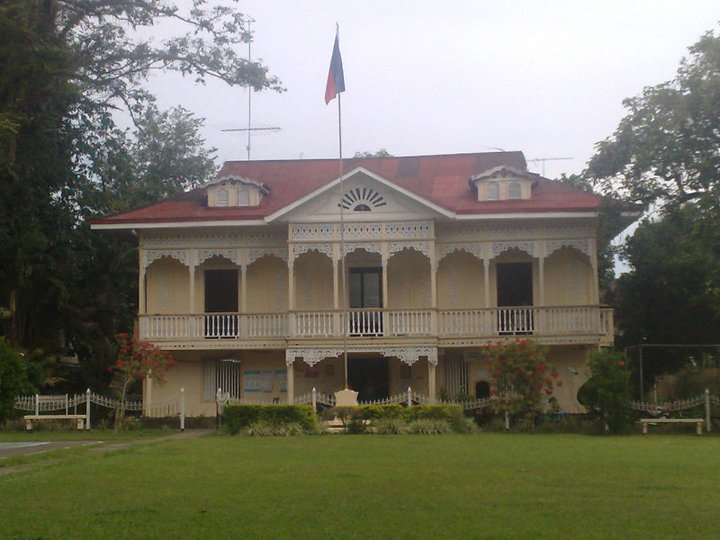
Century-old Spanish-designed Libagon Town Hall

=== List of former chief executives ===
During the early years of the Spanish regime, the town's leader was addressed as the "Capitan", similar to "Alcalde Municipal" or "Presidente Municipal", and is currently addressed as "Municipal Mayor". The recorded succession of leaders in Libagon from Spanish to American regimes to the Postwar period (Philippine Independence) from 1946–1965 is as follows:

- Capitan Domingo Espina
- Capitan Pedro Espina
- Capitan Felix Espina
- Capitan Estanislao Decenteceo
- 1870: Gobernadorcillo Don Gabriel Ydjao
- 1885-Gobernadorcillo Don Nicolas Idjao
- 1889-1891: Gobernadorcillo-Don Cepriano Lebiste (Tomas Jabonillo)
- 1913-1916: Presidente Municipal Mariano L. Espina
- 1917-1920: Presidente Municipal Macario Logroňo
- 1921-1928: Presidente Municipal Mariano L. Espina
- 1929-1931: Presidente Municipal Fabio Bayon
- 1931-1932: Presidente Municipal Isidro Pajuyo
- 1933-1940: Municipal Mayor Rito Monte de Ramos
- 1941-1944: Municipal Mayor Gregorio E. Edillo
- 1944-1945: Municipal Mayor Francisco E. Espina
- 1945-1946: Municipal Mayor Gregorio E. Edillo
- 1946-1947: Municipal Mayor Joaquin Siega
- 1948-1951: Municipal Mayor Francisco E. Espina
- 1952-1955: Municipal Mayor Agustin E. Espina
- 1956-1959: Municipal Mayor Mario E. Espina
- 1960-1963: Municipal Mayor Rito Monte de Ramos
- 1964-1967: Municipal Mayor Mario E. Espina

During the Japanese occupation of the Philippines (1942–1945), Petronilo "Liloy" Ebarle was appointed as the Municipal Mayor from 1942 to 1944. However, the guerrillas alluded to him as a "puppet mayor". Though Mayor Ebarle held the Japanese-appointed position, Mayor Gregorio E. Edillo continued to be the official leader under the authority of the Philippine Commonwealth with the United States. On the other hand, the people also recognized the command of the guerrilla forces of Leyte or the Leyte Area Command under Colonel Ruperto Kangleon, and supported the supervision of the Volunteer Guards at the town level. There were only two leaders of the Volunteer Guards in Libagon; the first was Lieutenant Francisco Barros, followed by Francisco "Dodo" Espina.

The only Libagonian officials of the Leyte Area Command (LAC) were Lieutenant Catalino "Nongnong" E. Soledad, Lieutenant Feliciano "Lily" A. Espina, and Lieutenant Marcelo "Celing" E. Espina, who were also officers of USAFFE (U.S. Army Forces in the Far East). These three Libagonians fought in the Battle of Bataan, which represented the most intense phase of Imperial Japan's invasion of the Philippines during World War II. Marcelino Espina did not return to his hometown; his body was left on the battlefield of Bataan. He was the younger brother of Francisco "Dodo" Espina, who became the town's mayor for two terms. Like Celing, many guerrillas from Libagon died during the war. A memorial stone (Ang Bato sa Paghandum) was built in memory of these men of Libagon. Their names were engraved on granite to honor their lives and monumentalize their memory and courageous deeds. The memorial stone now stands in the midst of Libagon Rizal Park.

The Contemporary period includes the final years of the Third Republic (1965–72) and the entirety of the Fourth Republic (1972–86) to the succeeding years following the 1986 People Power Revolution.

- 1968-1979: Municipal Mayor Salvador M. Resma
- 1979-1986: Municipal Mayor Domingo P. Espina
- 1986-1992: Municipal Mayor Rogato J. Paitan
- 1992-2001: Municipal Mayor Domingo P. Espina
- 2001-2010: Municipal Mayor Rizalina Espina née Bañez (formerly a.k.a. Inday S. Bañez)
- 2010-2019: Municipal Mayor Oliver E. Ranque

== Notable sites ==
=== Patag Daku Rainforest ===
Patag Daku ("big plain") is a 500-hectare rainforest on the slopes above Libagon town. Guided treks traverse dense vegetation over approximately six hours, connecting to Pacific coastal vistas.

=== Municipal Town Hall ===
The century-old Spanish-style municipal hall, located in Libagon's plaza, is listed among Southern Leyte's heritage buildings.

=== Old Seaport and Rizal Park ===
Ruins of the prewar seaport at Jubas and the adjacent Rizal Park are municipal heritage sites commemorating Libagon's maritime history and national hero José Rizal.

== Education ==
=== The Parish Convent and Libagon Academy ===
The Parish Convent, built adjacent to the town church, survived wartime fires and numerous typhoons and earthquakes. From 1945 to 1949, rooms in the friary housed the municipality's first Catholic secondary school, initially known as Libagon High School, Inc.

The school's curriculum combined the "3 R's" (reading, writing, and arithmetic) with catechism instruction and Spanish language classes. Students are also trained in music for the church choir and town band.

In 1949, following a recommendation by the Bureau of Private Schools, the board renamed the institution Libagon Academy and reconstituted it as the non-profit Libagon Academy Foundation, Inc., directing all proceeds toward campus improvements. The academy remains the only Catholic secondary school in the municipality.

== Infrastructure ==
=== Transportation ===
In Sogod, Southern Leyte, single motorcycles known locally as habal-habal provide transport to remote and mountainous villages. Sogod serves as a regional terminus linking Leyte Island with nearby provinces by road.

Scheduled bus, jeepney, and for-hire van services operate from Sogod to Maasin City, Ormoc City, Tacloban City, Bato, Hilongos, Liloan (via Libagon), Hinunangan, and Silago.

The Libagon Highway forms part of the Pan-Philippine Highway (AH26), a 3,517 km network of roads, bridges, and ferry links that connects Luzon, Samar, Leyte, and Mindanao. Its northern terminus is in Laoag City, and its southern terminus is in Zamboanga City.

Travel by bus from Libagon to Manila, including a ferry crossing from Northern Samar to Matnog, typically takes about 24 hours.
