= Southern Leyte's 2nd congressional district =

Legislative district of the Philippines

Southern Leyte's 1st congressional district
- Constituency for the House of Representatives of the Philippines
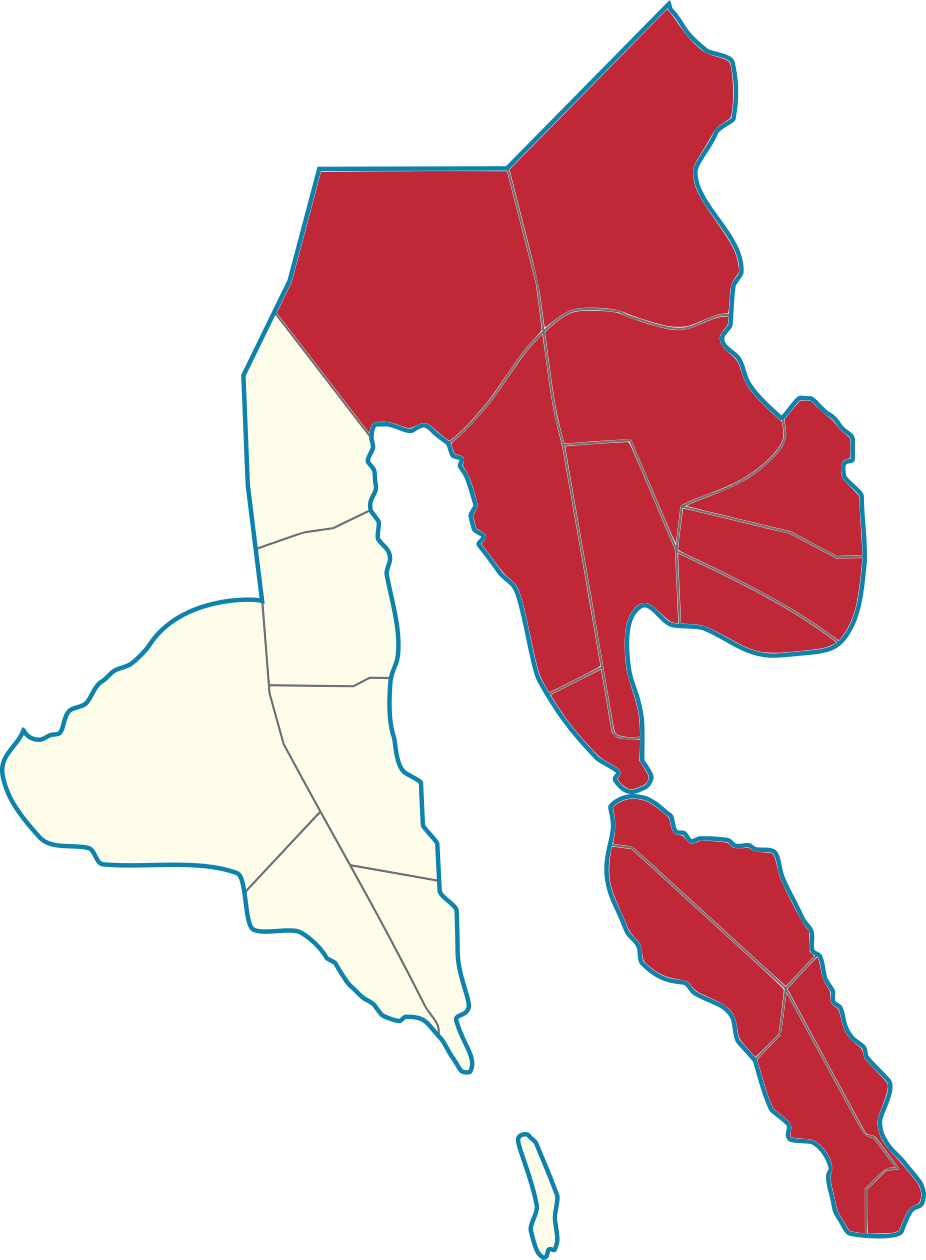
- Boundary of the congressional district in the province
- Province: Southern Leyte
- Region: Eastern Visayas
- Population: 228,152 (2020)
- Electorate: 159,882 (2022)
- Major settlements: 12 LGUs: Municipalities; Anahawan; Hinunangan; Hinundayan; Libagon; Liloan; Pintuyan; Saint Bernard; San Francisco; San Juan; San Ricardo; Silago; Sogod
- Area: 1,194.7 km^{2} (461.3 sq mi)

Current constituency
- Created: 2019
- Representative: Christopherson Yap
- Political party: NUP
- Congressional bloc: Majority

Southern Leyte's 2nd legislative district is one of the two congressional districts of the Philippines in the province of Southern Leyte. The district has been represented in the lower house of the Congress since 2022. It is composed of municipalities of Sogod, Libagon, Liloan, San Francisco, Pintuyan, San Ricardo, Saint Bernard, Anahawan, San Juan, Hinunangan, Hinundayan and Silago. It is currently represented in the 20th Congress by Christopherson Yap of the National Unity Party (NUP), who is the first representative of district since its creation.

== Representation history ==
#	Image	Member	Term of office		Congress	Party	Electoral history	Constituent LGUs
#	Image	Member	Start	End	Congress	Party	Electoral history	Constituent LGUs
District created February 1, 2019 from Southern Leyte's at-large district.
1		Christopherson Yap	June 30, 2022	Incumbent	19th	Lakas	Elected in 2022.	2022–present: Anahawan, Hinunangan, Hinundayan, Libagon, Liloan, Pintuyan, Saint Bernard, San Francisco, San Juan, San Ricardo, Silago, Sogod
1		Christopherson Yap	June 30, 2022	Incumbent	20th	NUP	Re-elected in 2025.	2022–present: Anahawan, Hinunangan, Hinundayan, Libagon, Liloan, Pintuyan, Saint Bernard, San Francisco, San Juan, San Ricardo, Silago, Sogod

== Election results ==
=== 2025 ===
Candidate	Party	Votes	%
Christopherson Yap (incumbent)	Lakas–CMD	74,505	52.18
Emie Tan	Independent	68,288	47.82
Total		142,793	100.00
Valid votes		142,793	96.51
Invalid/blank votes		5,158	3.49
Total votes		147,951	100.00
Registered voters/turnout		165,267	89.52
Lakas–CMD hold			
Source: Commission on Elections

=== 2022 ===
2022 Philippine House of Representatives elections
Party	Candidate	Votes	%
Lakas	Christopherson Yap	63,979	56.74
PROMDI	Florentino "Junbie" Fernandez	39,246	34.8
PFP	Alexander "Alex" Cuaton	4,340	3.85
Independent	Vick Barcelon	3,739	3.32
Independent	Ray "Loloy" Maupoy	914	0.81
Independent	Miguelito "Mig" Cataran	546	0.48
Total votes		112,764	100.00
Lakas win (new seat)			

== See also ==
- Legislative districts of Southern Leyte
