= Anna Veloso-Tuazon =

Filipino lawyer and politician (born 1978)

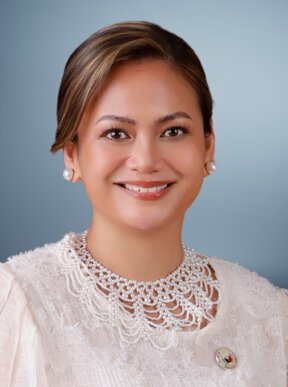
- Official portrait, 2025

Deputy Majority Leader of the House of Representatives of the Philippines
- Incumbent
- Assumed office July 29, 2025 Serving with several others
- House Speaker: Martin Romualdez; Bojie Dy

Member of the House of Representatives from Leyte’s 3rd District
- Incumbent
- Assumed office June 30, 2022
- Preceded by: Vicente Veloso III

Member of the Leyte Provincial Board from the 3rd District
- In office June 30, 2019 – June 30, 2022 Serving with Ma. Corazon Remandaban

Personal details
- Born: Anna Victoria M. Veloso; September 3, 1978 (age 48) Quezon City, Philippines
- Party: NUP (2018–present)
- Education: Ateneo de Manila University (BS); University of the Philippines Diliman (LL.B.); Vrije Universiteit Amsterdam (LL.M.)
- Occupation: Lawyer, politician

Anna Victoria Veloso-Tuazon (born Anna Victoria M. Veloso; September 3, 1978) is a Filipino lawyer and politician. A member of the National Unity Party, she is currently serving as a representative of the 3rd District of Leyte in the House of Representatives of the Philippines since 2022.

== Early life and education ==
Veloso was born on September 3, 1978, in Quezon City to a prominent political family in Leyte. She studied Ateneo de Manila University with the degree of Bachelor of Science in legal management. She took up law at the University of the Philippines Diliman. In 2004, Veloso passed the bar examination. She took up master's degree in international commercial and trade law at the Vrije Universiteit Amsterdam.

== Legal career ==
Veloso worked as senior associate of the Romulo Mabanta Buenaventura Sayoc & De Los Angeles law firm from 2004 to 2010.

== Political career ==
=== Leyte Provincial Board (2019–2022) ===
In 2019, Veloso was elected as member of the Leyte Provincial Board until 2022.

=== House of Representatives (2022–present) ===
In 2022, Veloso was elected as representative for the third district of Leyte after she succeeded her father.

== Personal life ==
His father Vicente Veloso III, is also a representative of the third district of Leyte from 2016 to 2022.

== Electoral history ==
Electoral history of Anna Veloso-Tuazon
Year	Office	Party	Votes received				Result
Year	Office	Party	Total	%	P.	Swing	Result
2019	Board Member (Leyte–3rd)	NUP	52,051	—N/a	1st	—N/a	Won
2022	Representative (Leyte–3rd)	NUP	53,457	100.00%	1st	—N/a	Unopposed
2025	Representative (Leyte–3rd)	NUP	57,303	53.47%	1st	—N/a	Won

== See also ==
- List of female members of the House of Representatives of the Philippines
