= Christopherson Yap =

Filipino politician (born 1981)

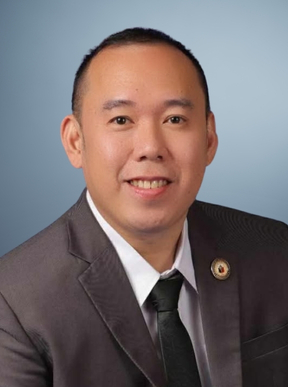
- Official portrait, 2026

Member of the House of Representatives from Southern Leyte's 2nd congressional district
- Incumbent
- Assumed office June 30, 2022
- Preceded by: District established

Acting Governor of Southern Leyte
- In office August 10, 2017 – October 31, 2018
- Preceded by: Damian Mercado
- Succeeded by: Damian Mercado

Vice Governor of Southern Leyte
- In office June 30, 2016 – June 30, 2022
- Governor: Damian Mercado
- Preceded by: Sheferred Lino Tan
- Succeeded by: Rosa Emilia Mercado

Personal details
- Born: Christopherson Macabata Yap; November 26, 1981 (age 44) Cebu City, Philippines
- Party: NUP (2026–present)
- Other political affiliations: Lakas (2022–2026); PDP–Laban (2018–2022); Liberal (2015–2018)
- Education: University of San Carlos
- Occupation: Politician

Christopherson Macabata Yap (born November 26, 1981), also known as Coco Yap is a Filipino politician. He is currently serving as representative of the Southern Leyte's 2nd district in the House of Representatives of the Philippines since 2022. He served as Vice Governor of Southern Leyte from 2016 to 2022.

== Early life and education ==
Yap was born on November 26, 1981 in Cebu City, Philippines to Crispin Yap and Amalia Yap (née Macabata). He studied at the University of San Carlos.

== Political career ==
=== Vice Governor of Southern Leyte (2016–2022) ===
Yap was elected as vice governor of Southern Leyte from 2016 to 2022 where he served for two terms.

=== Acting Governor of Southern Leyte (2017–2018) ===
In 2017, Yap was appointed as acting governor of Southern Leyte after the suspension of Governor Damian Mercado.

=== House of Representatives (2020–present) ===
In 2022, Yap was elected as representative for second district of Southern Leyte. In 2025, he was reelected.

== Controversies ==
In 2016, a 17-year-old girl accused Yap for raping her when he was vice governor. In 2018, the case filed against him was dismissed.

== Personal life ==
In 2025, his mother, Amalia Yap ran as governor of Southern Leyte but she lost to Damian Mercado.

== Electoral history ==
Electoral history of Christopherson Yap
Year	Office	Party	Votes received				Result
Year	Office	Party	Total	%	P.	Swing	Result
2016	Vice Governor of Southern Leyte	Liberal	89,324	—N/a	1st	—N/a	Won
2019	Vice Governor of Southern Leyte	PDP–Laban	131,145	—N/a	1st	—N/a	Won
2022	Representative (Southern Leyte–2nd)	PDP–Laban	63,979	56.74%	1st	—N/a	Won
2025	Representative (Southern Leyte–2nd)	Lakas	74,505	52.18%	1st	—N/a	Won
