= Legislative districts of Southern Leyte =

Constituency in the Philippines

The legislative districts of Southern Leyte are the representations of the province of Southern Leyte in the various national legislatures of the Philippines. The province is currently represented in the lower house of the Congress of the Philippines through its first and second congressional districts.

== History ==
Prior to gaining separate representation, areas now under the jurisdiction of Southern Leyte were represented under the undivided province of Leyte (2nd and 3rd districts, 1907–1931; 3rd district, 1931–1961).

Republic Act No. 2227, enacted on May 22, 1959, created the province of Southern Leyte from the southern municipalities of Leyte that constituted its third congressional district. Per Section 5 of R.A. 2227, the incumbent representatives of all five districts of Leyte continued to serve for the remainder of 4th Congress. Southern Leyte began to elect a separate representative under its own name starting in the 1961 elections.

Southern Leyte was represented in the Interim Batasang Pambansa as part of Region VIII from 1978 to 1984. The province returned one representative, elected at-large, to the Regular Batasang Pambansa in 1984.

Under the new Constitution which was proclaimed on February 11, 1987, the province constituted a lone district which elected its member to the restored House of Representatives starting that same year.

The signing of Republic Act No. 11198 on February 1, 2019 reapportioned Southern Leyte into two legislative districts. Given that it was already too late for the Commission on Elections to change the old congressional district configuration data in the automated election system in time for the May 2019 polls, COMELEC Resolution No. 10524 was promulgated to delay the elections for the two new districts to a date no less than six months from May 13, 2019. By virtue of COMELEC Resolution No. 10552, the date of the elections for the first and second districts of Southern Leyte was set for October 26, 2019.

On October 10, 2019, the COMELEC regional office for Eastern Visayas suspended the special elections and delayed it to November 30, pending the Supreme Court of the Philippines issuing a certificate of finality in a related case in which COMELEC was found to violate the law by setting separate special elections for the reconfigured 1st Congressional District of South Cotabato and the newly created Lone Congressional District of General Santos City instead of the next regular (i.e., 2022) election.

Ultimately, no special elections were carried out. Instead, on December 11, 2019, COMELEC — taking into account the September 10, 2019 Supreme Court ruling on the South Cotabato case (Vice Mayor Shirlyn L. Bañas-Nograles, et al. Vs. Commission on Elections) — adopted the recommendation of its legal department to direct the Special Provincial Board of Canvassers for the Province of Southern Leyte to count the votes cast in the May 2019 elections. Roger Mercado was certified as the duly elected representative on December 16, 2019 by the Southern Leyte Provincial Board of Canvassers, and took his oath as the representative of the Lone Congressional District the next day.

The 1st and 2nd districts began electing their own representatives starting from the 2022 elections.

== Current districts ==
Southern Leyte's current congressional delegation is composed of two members.

NUP (1)
PFP (1)

Legislative districts and representatives of Southern Leyte
District	Current Representative		Party	Constituent LGUs	Population (2020)	Area	Map
District	Image	Name	Party	Constituent LGUs	Population (2020)	Area	Map
1st		Roger Mercado (since 2025); Maasin	PFP	List: Maasin; Bontoc; Limasawa; Macrohon; Malitbog; Padre Burgos; Tomas Oppus	201,421	603.91 km²	
2nd		Christopherson M. Yap (since 2022); Sogod	NUP	List: Anahawan; Hinunangan; Hinundayan; Libagon; Liloan; Pintuyan; Saint Bernard; San Francisco; San Juan; San Ricardo; Silago; Sogod	228,152	1,194.7 km²	

== Historical districts ==
=== Lone District (defunct) ===
- Population (2015): 421,750

Period	Representative
5th Congress; 1961–1965	Nicanor E. Yñiguez, Jr.
6th Congress; 1965–1969	Nicanor E. Yñiguez, Jr.
7th Congress; 1969–1972	Nicanor E. Yñiguez, Jr.
8th Congress; 1987–1992	Roger G. Mercado
8th Congress; 1987–1992	Rosette Y. Lerias (Note: Replaced Roger G. Mercado as per House of Representatives Electoral Tribunal (HRET) decision on October 15, 1991.)
9th Congress; 1992–1995	Roger G. Mercado
10th Congress; 1995–1998	Roger G. Mercado
11th Congress; 1998–2001	Aniceto G. Saludo, Jr.
12th Congress; 2001–2004	Aniceto G. Saludo, Jr.
13th Congress; 2004–2007	Roger G. Mercado
14th Congress; 2007–2010	Roger G. Mercado
15th Congress; 2010–2013	Roger G. Mercado
16th Congress; 2013–2016	Damian G. Mercado
17th Congress; 2016–2019	Roger G. Mercado (Note: Took oath as representative of the Lone District of Southern Leyte on 17 December 2019.) (Note: Resigned on appointment as Secretary of Public Works and Highways on October 13, 2021.)
18th Congress; 2019–2022	Roger G. Mercado

=== At-Large (defunct) ===
Period	Representative
Regular Batasang Pambansa; 1984–1986	Nicanor E. Yñiguez, Jr.
