= Southern Leyte State University =

Public university in Southern Leyte, Philippines

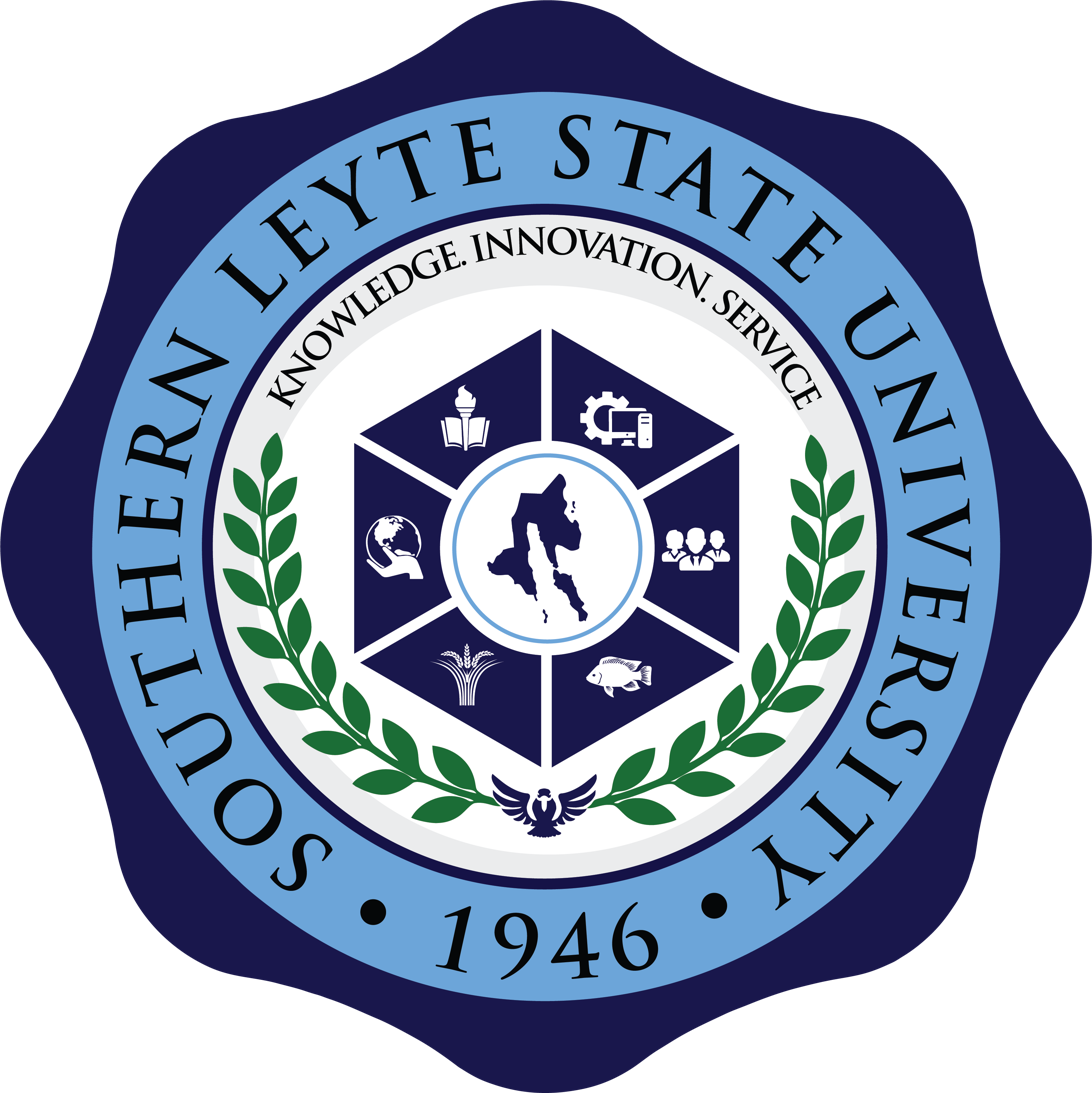
- Former names: Sogod/Main Campus: Sogod National Trade School (1969–1981); Southern Leyte School of Arts and Trade (1981–1995); Southern Leyte State College of Science and Technology (1995–2004); Tomas Oppus Campus: Tomas Oppus Normal College (1986–2004)
- Motto: Eruditio. Invenio. Servo. (Latin) "Knowledge Innovation. Service."
- Type: State University
- Established: March 7, 2004
- Academic affiliations: AACCUP and ISO 9001:2008
- President: Dr. Jude A. Duarte
- Vice-president: Dr. Constantino G. Medilo, Jr. (Academic Affairs); Dr. Christine Alma Mae M. Daguplo (Administration & Finance); Dr. Francis Ann R. Sy (Research, Innovation & Extension Services); Dr. Marie Khul C. Langub (Student Exchange & Support Services)
- Location: Southern Leyte, Philippines; 10°23′30″N 124°58′47″E
- Campus: Main Campus Sogod, Southern Leyte Satellite campuses: Tomas Oppus, Southern Leyte; San Juan, Southern Leyte; Bontoc, Southern Leyte; Hinunangan, Southern Leyte; Maasin City, Southern Leyte
- Colors: Navy Blue and White
- Nickname: Mighty Kingfishers
- Sporting affiliations: SCUAA
- Website: southernleytestateu.edu.ph
- Location in the Visayas Location in the Philippines

Southern Leyte State University (Filipino: Pamantasang Pamahalaan ng Southern Leyte) is a public university situated in Southern Leyte, Philippines. It is mandated to provide advanced education, higher technological, professional instruction and training in trade, fishery, agriculture, forestry, science, education, commerce, engineering and related courses. It is also mandated to undertake research and extension services, and provided progressive leadership in its areas of specialization. Formerly the Southern Leyte State College of Science and Technology and Tomas Oppus Normal College, SLSU was created through the passage of Republic Act 9261 on March 7, 2004.

== History ==
Southern Leyte State University currently operates in six (6) campuses all within Southern Leyte.

=== Main Campus ===
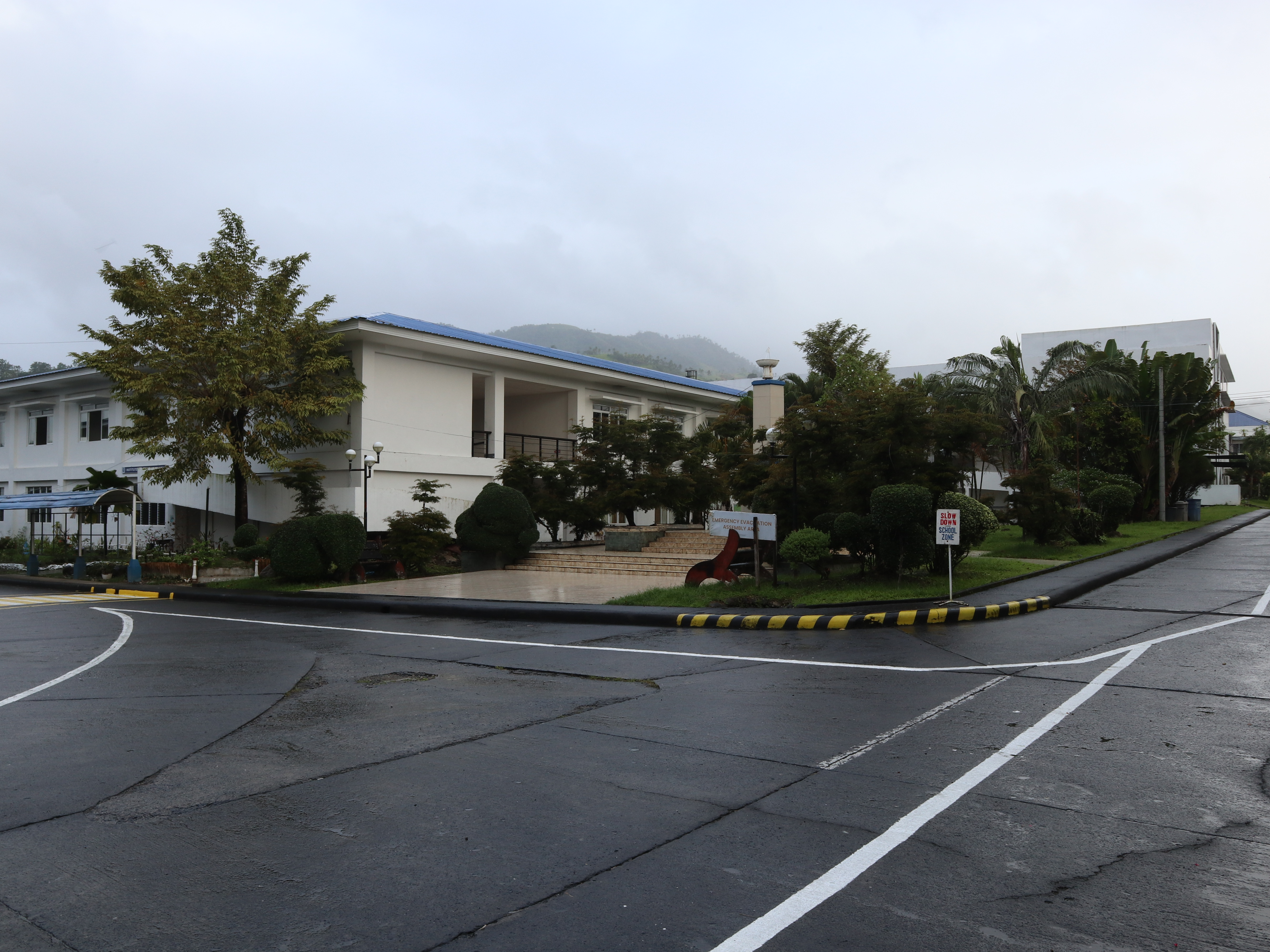
Main campus

On July 7, 1969, Sogod National Trade School was created by virtue of Republic Act No. 4352, a vocational institution in Sogod, Southern Leyte, tasked to answer the problem of lack of manpower training for adults and out of school youths. Twelve years after, the school once again was converted into Southern Leyte School of Arts and Trade, this time transforming it into an institution of tertiary education. Republic Act 7930 was enacted by the Congress of the Philippines on March 1, 1995, further converting the school into a chartered state College and renamed it Southern Leyte State College of Science and Technology (SLSCST). Republic Act 9261 which was enacted and approved by Congress and the Senate Republic of the Philippines on March 7, 2004, established the Southern Leyte State University by integrating the Southern Leyte State College of Science and Technology in the Municipality of Sogod and Tomas Oppus Normal College in the Municipality of Tomas Oppus. With this development, five higher education campuses were integrated to comprise the university since SLSCST has been made host to three other CHED-supervised institutions in October 1999.

=== Tomas Oppus Campus ===
The Tomas Oppus Campus houses the Faculty of Teacher Education. Barrio Resolution No. 52, s. 1970 of Barrio San Isidro, Tomas Oppus, Southern Leyte established the Tomas Oppus Community College (TOCC). On February 1, 1986, Presidential Decree # 2024 converted the TOCC into a State College to be known as Tomas Oppus Normal College. In 1987 the Department of Education Culture & Sports (DECS now DEPED) Regional Office #8 granted the school to offer a 4-year course in Bachelor of Arts and Bachelor of Science in Education programs. RA 9261 established the Southern Leyte State University through the integration of this college with SLSCST on March 7, 2004.

=== San Juan Campus ===
The San Juan Campus houses the Faculty of Business and Management. It started as a Municipal High School. In 1946, it was established as the San Juan Polytechnic College. Eighteen years later, it was converted into Cabalian National Vocational High School by Legislation. In 1965, Congress changed the school into San Juan Comprehensive High School. By virtue of Batas Pambansa Blg. 569, the San Juan Polytechnic College was established on June 24, 1983. Eventually, RA 9261 established the Southern Leyte State University - San Juan after its integration with SLSCST in 1999.

=== Bontoc Campus ===
The Faculty of Aquatic and Applied Life Sciences is found at the Bontoc Campus. On June 7, 1964, RA No. 3938 established the Bontoc Agricultural and Technical School. Three years later it was renamed to Bontoc National Agricultural and Fishery School (BNAFS). On June 10, 1983, Batas Pambansa (BP) Bilang 494 established BNAFS into the Southern Leyte Agro-Fishery Technical Institute making it a full-pledged tertiary institution. On November 22, 1985, BP Bilang 888 renamed the school to Ruperto K. Kangleon Memorial Agro-Fisheries Technical Institute (RKKMAFTI). Eventually, RA 9261 established the Southern Leyte State University - Bontoc after its integration with SLSCST in 1999.

=== Hinunangan Campus ===
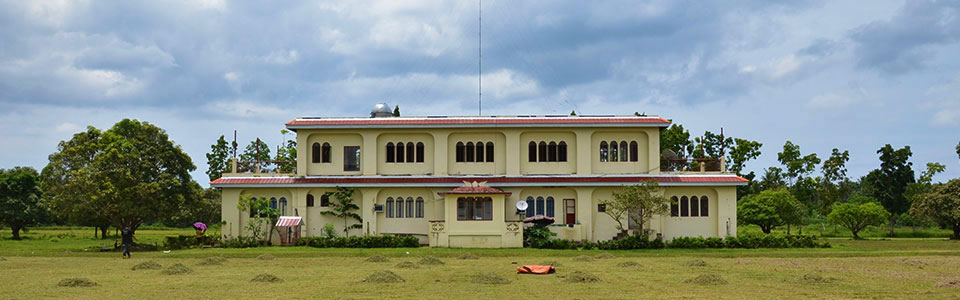
SLSU Hinunangan

The Hinunangan Campus houses the Faculty of Agriculture and Environmental Sciences. RA 5380 established the Hinunangan Agricultural and Vocational School (HAVS) on 15 June 1968. On March 1, 1995, RA 7931 converted HAVS into a tertiary institution and was renamed to the Southern Leyte Institute of Agriculture and Technology (SLIAT). Eventually, RA 9261 established the Southern Leyte State University - Hinunangan after its integration with SLSCST in 1999.

=== Maasin City Campus ===
The Maasin City Campus houses the Faculty of Good Governance and Development Studies. Formerly established as Maasin City College, City Ordinance No. 2006-033 established Maasin City College (MCC)'s duly approved during the regular session of Sangguniang Panlungsod of the City of Maasin held on November 22, 2006, at Barangay San Rafael, Maasin City, Southern Leyte. In 2018, By virtue of RA 11079, the established Maasin City College was integrated to Southern Leyte State University and is now known as Southern Leyte State University - Maasin City Campus offering Bachelor of Public Administration and Bachelor of Science in Social Work.

== Southern Leyte State University seal ==
The Southern Leyte State University (SLSU) seal is a circular emblem featuring symbolic elements that reflect the institution's history, mission, and regional identity. The seal is composed of concentric circles set within a dark blue, scalloped outer border. The primary colors used are navy blue, sky blue, white, green, and black. In the outer ring, the words "SOUTHERN LEYTE STATE UNIVERSITY" are inscribed in the upper arc, with the year "1946" at the bottom, marking the year its oldest campus in San Juan, Southern Leyte was established. Below the university name, a smaller arc contains the institutional motto: "KNOWLEDGE. INNOVATION. SERVICE". At the heart of the seal is a dark blue hexagon divided into six triangular segments, surrounding a silhouette of the map of Southern Leyte. A green laurel wreath hugs the lower half of the central hexagon and at the very base of the inner circle sits a stylized bird with outspread wings. Each segment of the hexagon contains a white icon representing the university's various disciplines:

- Open Book and Torch (representing education and the pursuit of knowledge)
- Gear and Computer (symbolizing technology, engineering, and digital innovation)
- Human Figures (representing the social sciences and the community)
- Fish (representing aquatic resources and fisheries)
- Grain Stalks (representing agriculture)
- Globe held by a Hand (symbolizing a global perspective)

== Faculties ==
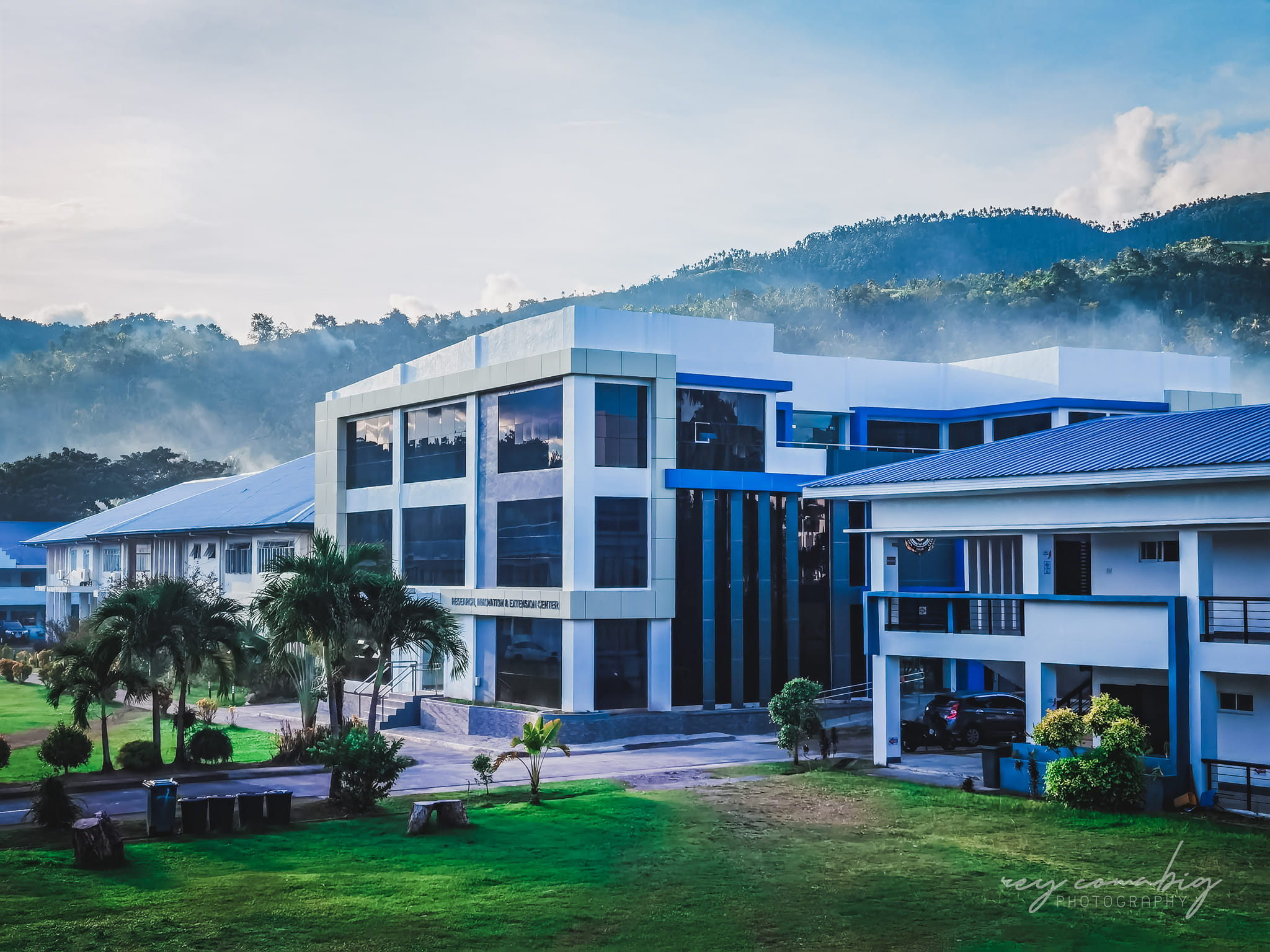
The Research, Innovation and Extension Services (RIES) Building in the Main Campus of Southern Leyte State University. (Photographed by Mr. Rey Comabig)

- Faculty of Agriculture and Environmental Sciences
- Faculty of Aquatic and Applied Life Sciences
- Faculty of Arts and Sciences
- Faculty of Business and Management
- Faculty of Computing and Information Sciences
- Faculty of Criminal Justice
- Faculty of Engineering
- Faculty of Good Governance and Development Studies
- Faculty of Teacher Education
- Faculty of Hospitality and Tourism Management
- Faculty of Education, Technology, and Innovation
- Faculty of Industrial and Technology Management
