= Saint Thomas Aquinas College (Sogod) =

Roman Catholic school in Southern Leyte, Philippines

- Latin: Sanctus Tomas Aquinas Collegium
- Former name: Saint Thomas Aquinas Academy (STAA)
- Motto: We educate to evangelize. We evangelize to educate.
- Type: Private Non Sectarian
- Established: January 6, 1946
- Religious affiliation: Roman Catholic
- President: Most Rev. Precioso D. Cantillas, SDB, D.D.
- Director: Rev. Fr. Merwin L. Kangleon
- Location: Sogod, Southern Leyte, Philippines; 10°23′7″N 124°58′53″E
- Colours: Blue, black, and white
- Location in the Visayas Location in the Philippines

Saint Thomas Aquinas College (STAC) is a Roman Catholic private school located at the corner of Bagares Street and Concepcion Street, Barangay Zone IV, Sogod, Southern Leyte, Philippines. It is considered one of the oldest schools in Southern Leyte, serving the community since January 6, 1946. Two of its sister schools are the Saint Teresa School of Hilongos (STSH) and Saint Anthony's High School (SAHS) of Anahawan.

== History ==
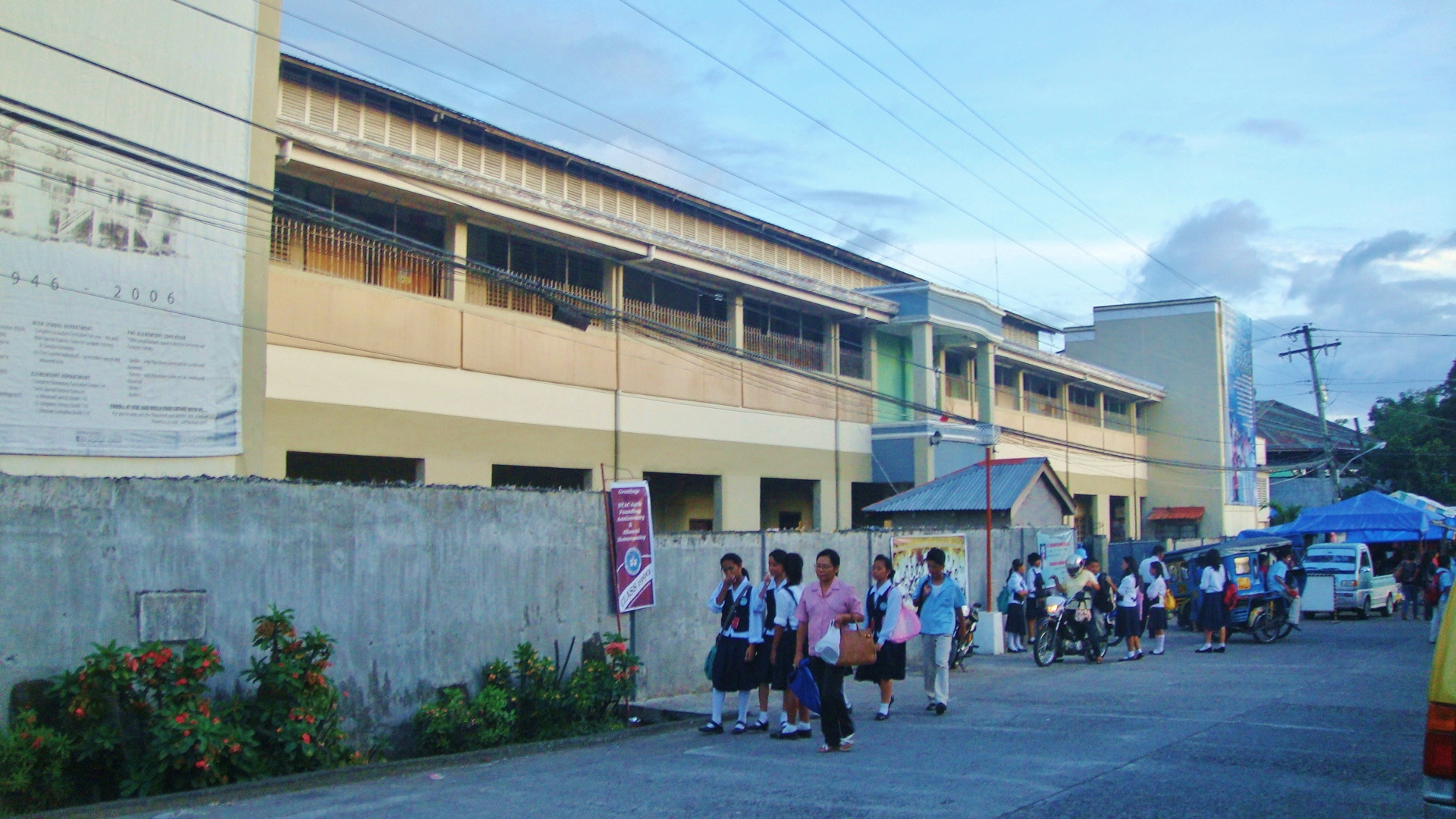
Saint Thomas Aquinas College

STAC started after World War II settled down when Fr. Luis Caintic saw the need for the town to have a learning institution named after the patron saint of Catholic education, Saint Thomas Aquinas. In 1952, the Saint Thomas Aquinas Academy or STAA Normal Department produced 26 graduates with an Elementary Teachers' Certificate (ETC) as well as 17 pupils from the Elementary Department. However, enrollment suffered a major setback in December 1951 when Typhoon Amy, one of the most destructive in that decade, ravaged the town. In 1952, Fr. Sergio Osmeña took the reins of running STAA from Fr. Caintic. A year later, he was replaced by Fr. Generoso Nielo. With the aid of some devotees of the Blessed Lady, he initiated the construction of the existing Grotto of Our Lady of Lourdes. Fr. Neilo was followed by Fr. Porfirio Suarez (1962–1972).

Under the directorship of Fr. Vicente Lora (1972–1980) many changes in the structure of STAA took place: A library, the administration building and a basketball court/quadrangle were constructed. During Fr. Juanito Arreglo's term as director (1982–1986), STAA established a Kindergarten School and a building was constructed for this purpose. When Fr. Manuel Nueve (1986–1992) took over, a two-room classroom building was constructed. Realizing the need to upgrade the school's facilities and to keep abreast with the challenging needs of the times, the school expanded its services when Msgr. Amado D. Olayvar assumed office in 1992. STAA offered a Junior Secretarial course later reclassified into an Associate in Computer Secretarial. It was also during Msgr. Olayvar's stewardship that STAA was converted into a collegiate institution on August 7, 1997, through SEC Registration No. A19971565. From then on, Saint Thomas Aquinas College (STAC) came into existence.

With Fr. Lorenzo Suarez's presence (1999–2001) at STAC, the Associate in Computer Secretarial was converted into Associate in Office Administration. He was replaced by Fr. Remegio P. Mollaneda, SVD, PhD (2001–2003) who worked out that STAC be given slots at the Catholic Media Center as its Computer Laboratory. It serves as an extension of the school's computer lab for high school and college students. He also worked out government recognition of the following four-year degree courses: Bachelor of Science in Office Administration (BSOA), Major in Computer Education; Bachelor of Science in commerce (BSC) in Entrepreneurship; Bachelor in Elementary Education (BEEd), Major in Communication Arts in English. The stage was improved through the Parents Teachers and Community Association (PTCA).

=== Today ===
At present, Rev. Fr. Merwin L. Kangleon is striving to improve the school facilities and manage the three-storey, 12-classroom building and constructed the new STAC building whereas the J&F Department Store took its place. He has built a chapel, replaced many computers, repaired damaged sections of the school. Most importantly, the spiritual formation and improvement of the academic performance of the pupils, students, and even of the faculty and staff has been improved. This is made possible through the cooperation of the parents, alumni, community and by the pupils, students, faculty and staff.

Saint Thomas Aquinas College Hymn

I

Saint Thomas Aquinas College,
Beloved Alma Mater
Thy faithful sons and daughters
Do sing in praise; do sing in praise of thee.
You hold your torch ablaze
Across the dark to me.
Your light so full of bliss
My guide shall always be..

II

Oh! Beloved STAC
There's a saint who guides your way
A saint of old, who has enriched the world
With knowledge brighter than gold.
Fountain of life I know
The stream of truth and good
My source is always you,
Your guiding fountain, the Lord.

Repeat I, finale:

Loyal to you I'll be.
Your symbol I'll always hold.
Oh, beloved STAC,
You give me wealth untold.

== See also ==
- Sogod, Southern Leyte
- Education in the Philippines - Tertiary Education
