= Agas-Agas Bridge =

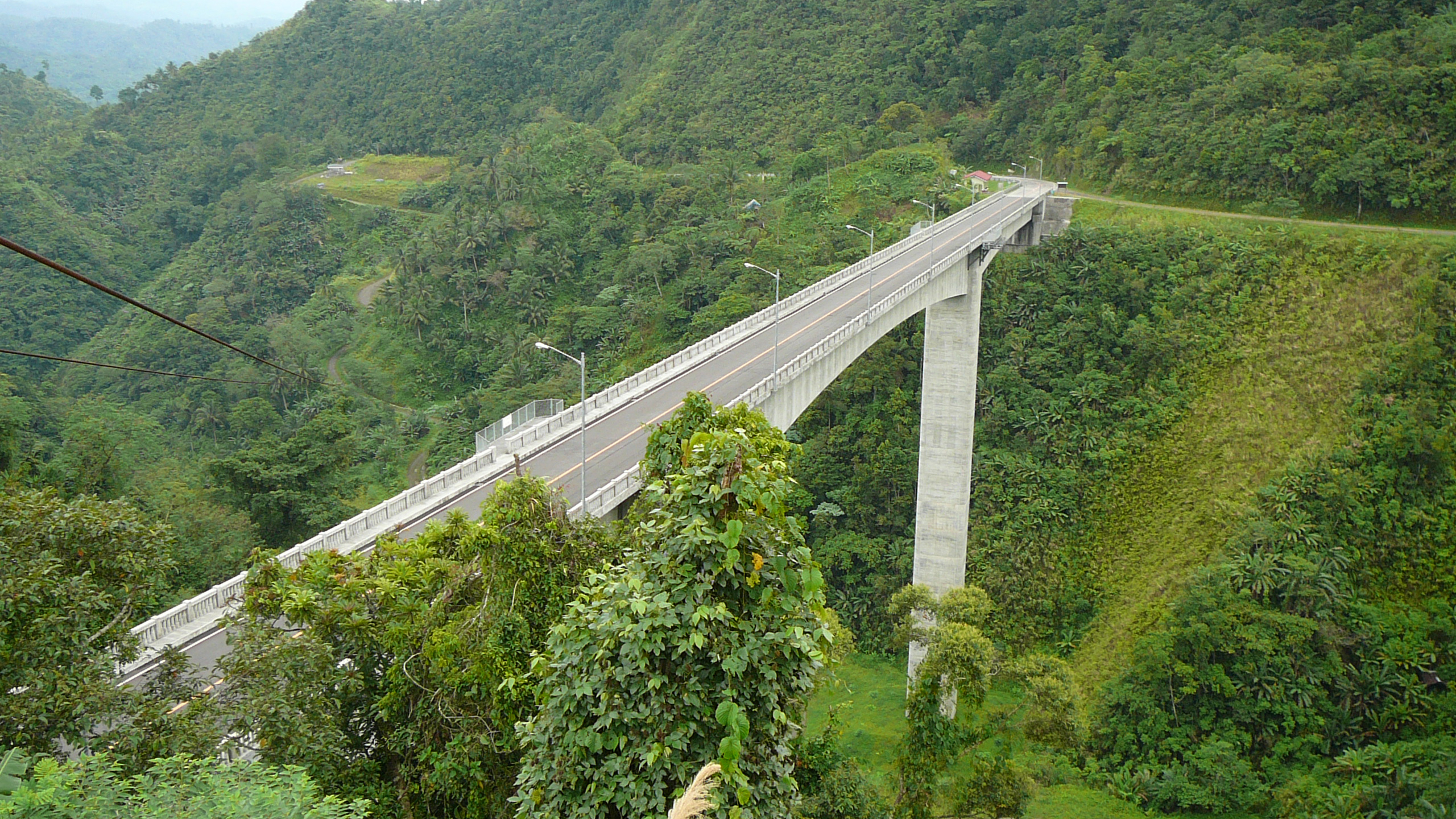
- Coordinates: 10.4972523°N 124.9979911°E
- Carries: 2 lanes of AH 26 (N1), vehicular traffic and pedestrians
- Locale: Sogod, Southern Leyte
- Maintained by: Department of Public Works and Highways

Characteristics
- Design: beam bridge
- Material: Prestressed concrete
- Total length: 350 m (1,150 ft)
- Width: 9.60 m (31.5 ft)
- Height: 89 m (292 ft)
- Load limit: 20 metric tons (20 long tons; 22 short tons)
- No. of lanes: Two-lane single carriageway
- Design life: 30 years

History
- Construction start: November 17, 2006
- Construction end: August 2, 2009
- Construction cost: ₱1.024 billion

The Agas-Agas Bridge is a prestressed concrete beam bridge on the Pan-Philippine Highway. The ₱1.024-billion bridge was funded partially by the Japan International Cooperation Agency. With a length of about 350 meters (1,150 ft) and a height of 89 meters (292 ft) above ground, the center span of the structure measures 177 meters (581 ft) in length supported by two piers measuring 73 meters (240 ft) and 75 meters (246 ft) from the ground.

The mountainous Agas-Agas section of the Pan-Philippine Highway in Southern Leyte is prone to landslides during heavy rains, much more when a typhoon strikes the province. The bridge was constructed in 2006 to avoid the troublesome section and cut down the driving time for motorists.

== Tourism ==
Seeing its high tourism potential the Department of Public Works and Highways (DPWH) submitted to President Gloria Macapagal Arroyo the plan to turn the bridge into a haven for enthusiasts of bungee jumping, paramotor, downhill skateboarding, zip-line, rappelling and other extreme sports. On August 9, 2009, the president signed the construction of the bungee jumping platform along the bridge as well as other tourism amenities.

The Agas-Agas Bridge zipline, now known as "Zipline Leyte", opened in April 2011. The twin zipline, one of the longest in the country at 880 meters (2,890 ft), glides diagonally above the bridge and the riverine below it. A Provincial Pavilion complete with a parking lot and food and souvenir kiosks has been constructed atop a promontory overlooking the deep ravine of the nearby gorge. The Agas Agas Bridge also has a spacious parking space, food kiosks and a tourist pavilion.
