= Malitbog, Southern Leyte =

Municipality in Southern Leyte, Philippines

Malitbog
- Municipality
- Municipality of Malitbog
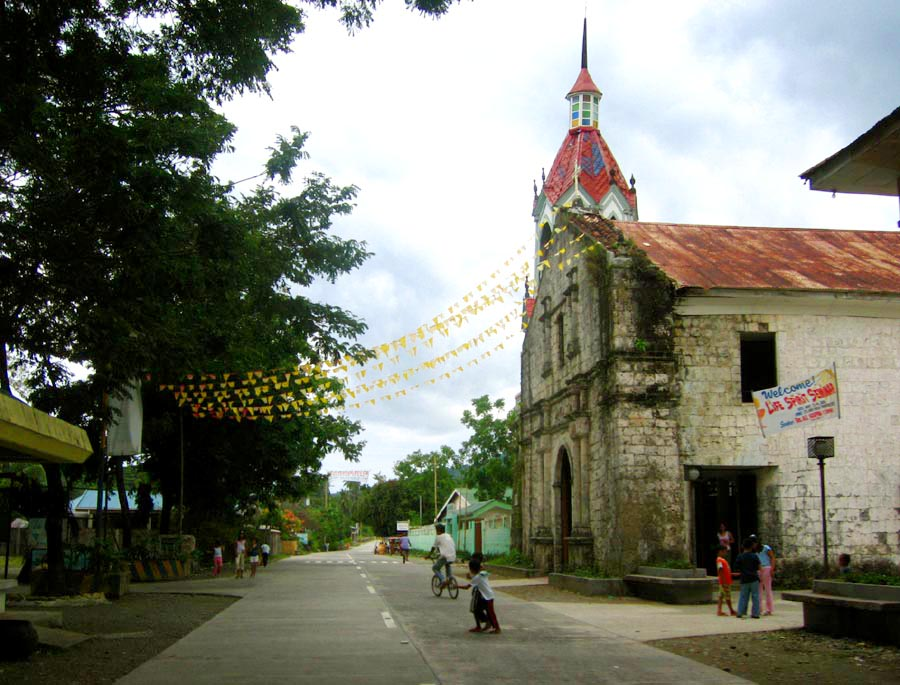
- Roman Catholic Church of Santo Niño

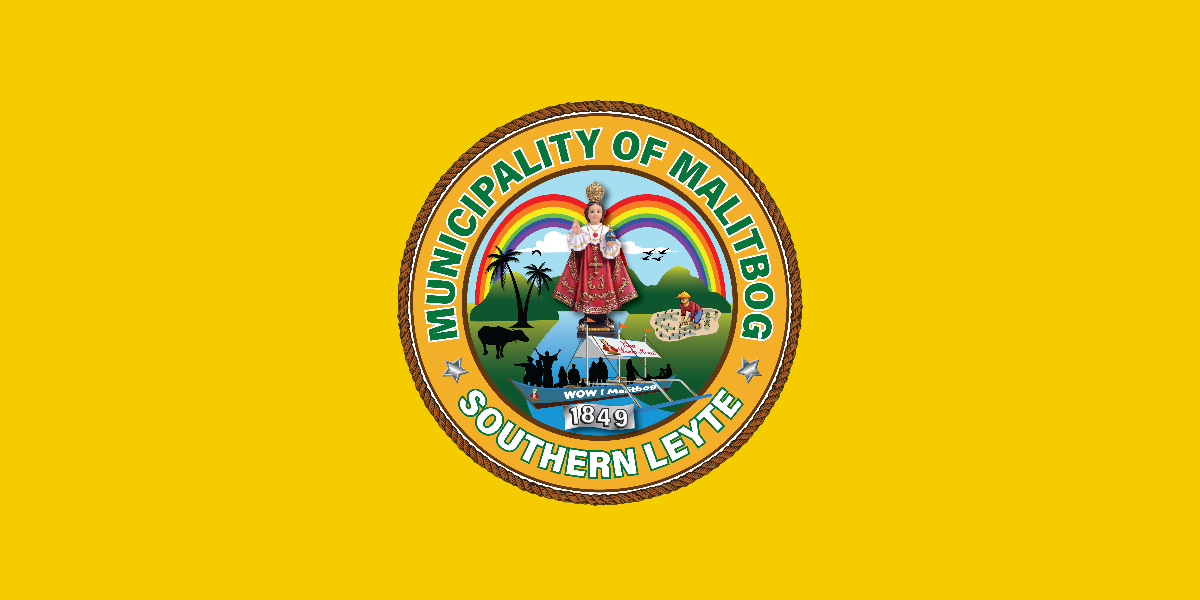
- Flag

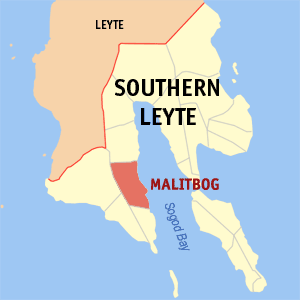
- Map of Southern Leyte with Malitbog highlighted
- Interactive map of Malitbog
- Location within the Philippines
- Coordinates: 10°09′N 125°00′E
- Country: Philippines
- Region: Eastern Visayas
- Province: Southern Leyte
- District: 1st district
- Barangays: 37 (see Barangays)

Government
  - Type: Sangguniang Bayan
  - Mayor: Kenneth Blair S. Oben (PDPLBN)
  - Vice Mayor: Antonio S. Lura Sr. (IND)
  - Representative: Luz V. Mercado
  - Municipal Council: Members: John Ryan S. Dy; Papias R. Namoc; Roland Leonard L. Sala; Alain Theodore M. Aberasturi; Ernesto B. Sabandal Jr.; Agustina V. Gabriel; Nestor M. Gonzales; Jove M. Oraiz
  - Electorate: 13,277 voters (2025)

Area
  - Total: 74.97 km^{2} (28.95 sq mi)
- Elevation: 91 m (299 ft)
- Highest elevation: 446 m (1,463 ft)
- Lowest elevation: 0 m (0 ft)

Population (2024 census)
  - Total: 21,691
  - Density: 289.3/km^{2} (749.4/sq mi)
  - Households: 4,728

Economy
  - Income class: 4th municipal income class
  - Poverty incidence: 30.18% (2023)
  - Revenue: ₱ 10.31 million (2024)
  - Assets: ₱ 442.5 million (2024)
  - Expenditure: ₱ 125.5 million (2024)
  - Liabilities: ₱ 45.14 million (2024)

Service provider
  - Electricity: Southern Leyte Electric Cooperative (SOLECO)
- Time zone: UTC+8 (PST)
- ZIP code: 6603
- PSGC: 0806409000
- IDD : area code: +63 (0)53
- Native languages: Boholano dialect Cebuano; Tagalog
- Website: www.malitbog-sleyte.gov.ph

Malitbog, officially the Municipality of Malitbog (Cebuano: Lungsod sa Malitbog; Tagalog: Bayan ng Malitbog), is a municipality in the province of Southern Leyte, Philippines. According to the 2024 census, it has a population of 21,691 people.

== History ==
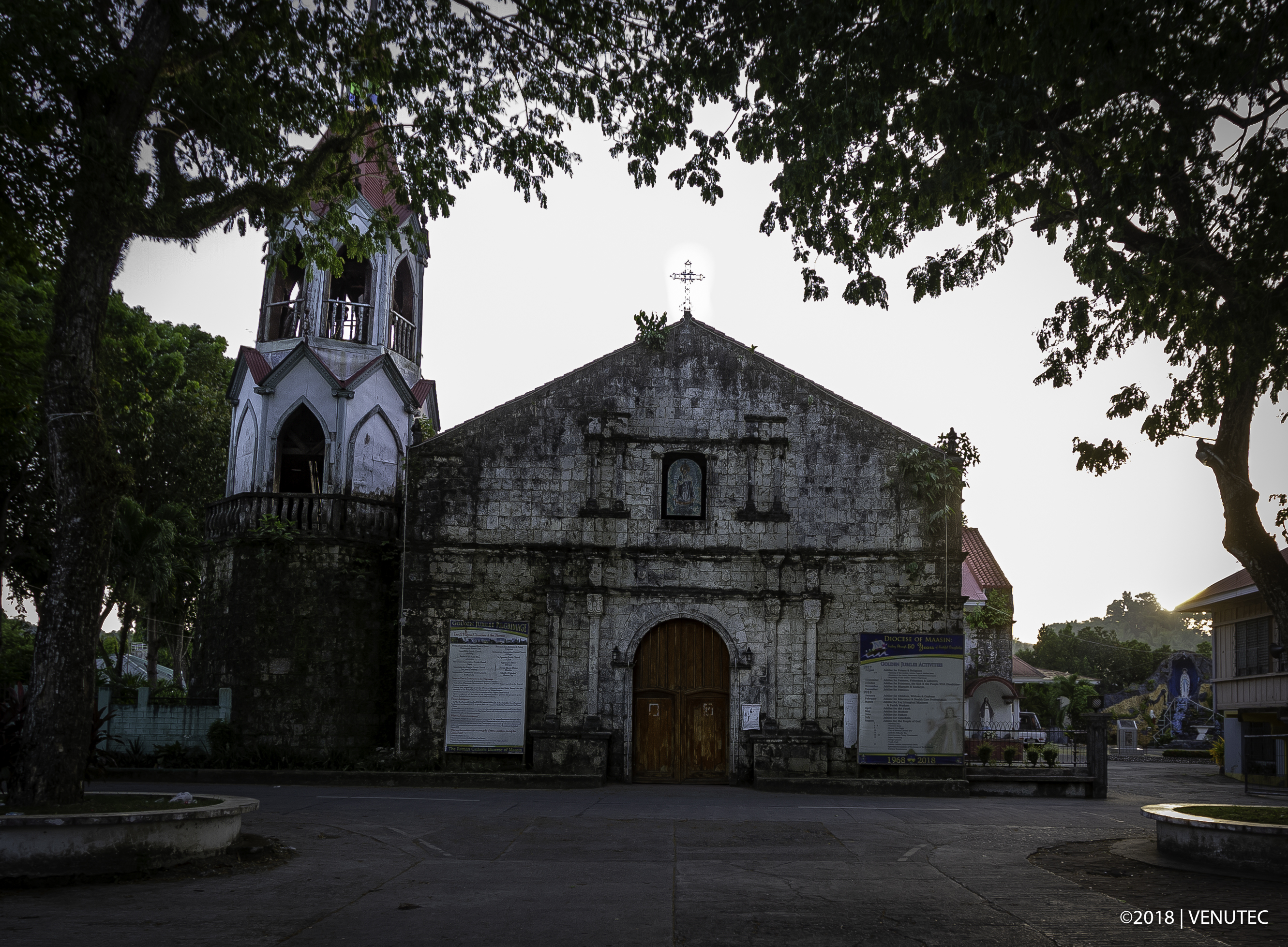
The Malitbog Santo Nino Church.

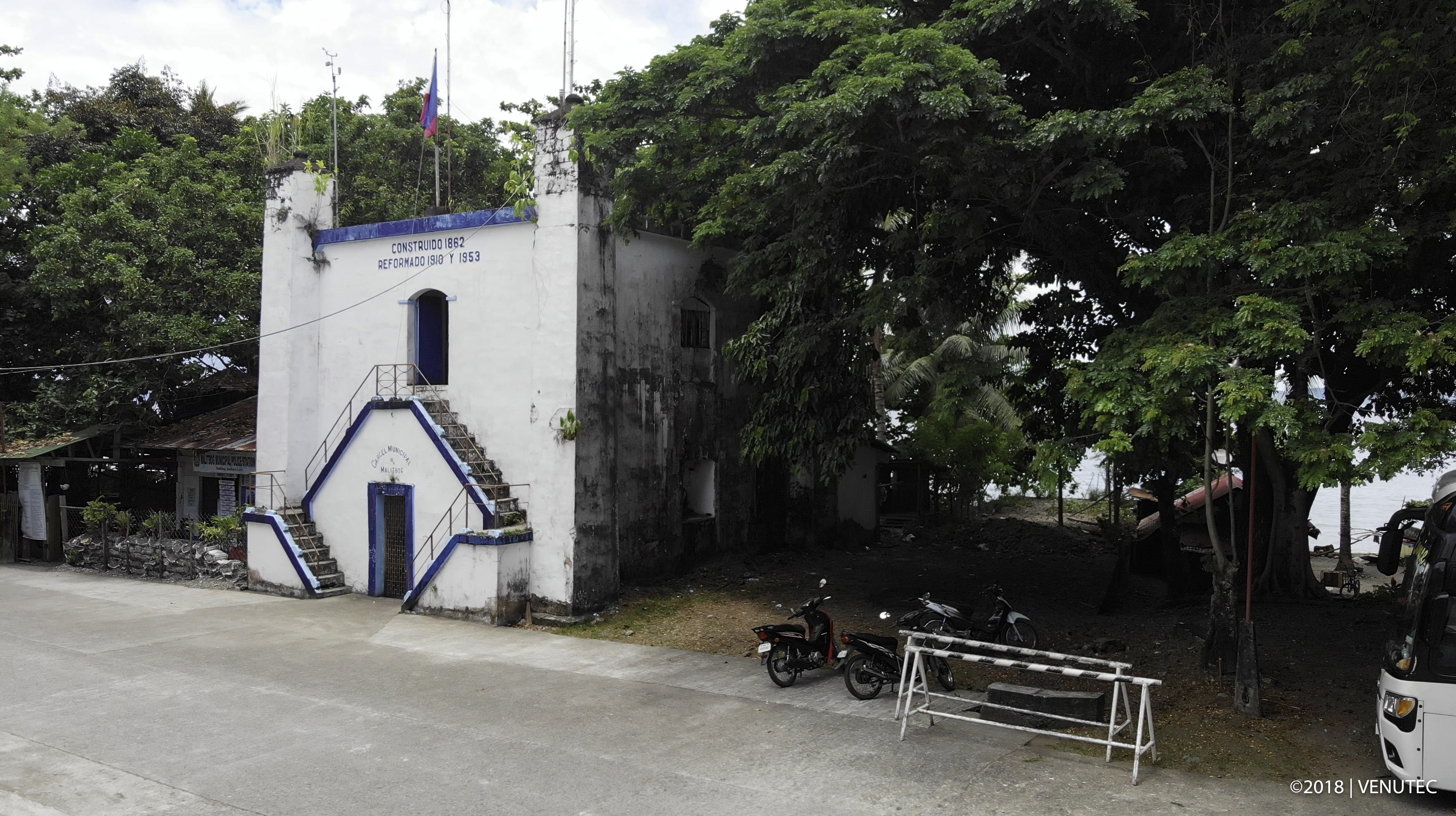
The Malitbog Watch Tower, built in 1862

The town of Malitbog, Southern Leyte, came into existence in the early 18th century as proven by the inscriptions on the stone walls of the ruins of the watchtowers "Baluarte" located equidistant from the Roman Catholic Church. One is found south of the Poblacion in Barangay Caaga and the other in Barangay Abgao north of the Poblacion. Said watchtowers were constructed in the year 1820. The two barangays abovementioned were ruled by their chieftains, called capitanes. No traces could be found as to the names of the capitanes. As absolute rulers of their respective barangays, they tried to established their own kingdoms. Both of the chieftains wanted to rule the other, hence, there was strong and keen rivalry between the two and the pueblo was to be organized by the Spaniards sometimes in the middle part of the 18th century. The inhabitants were very much confused as to where the pueblo be located. Confusion in the local dialect means "makalibog". Since that time the Spaniards organized the pueblo, they called it Malitbog, a derivative or distorted word from the dialect "makalibog". They built the Town Center midway and equidistant between the two Barrios.

Through the intercession of the Roman Catholic Priest who often visited the two warring barangays, a proposal was made to the rival barangays to fuse the two communities and establish a bigger church. Again, trouble arose as to where the church would be constructed. A settlement was later on made through the suggestion of the priest that the church be built not in any of the two barangays but in a location that shall serve as boundaries between them. In 1857, the Roman Catholic Church was built up in baroque architecture by forced labor. And in addition to the construction starting from the very portal of the church leading to the shoreline, going east to serve as the demarcation line between the two rival barangays, at the end of the dividing line a watchtower was constructed. This watchtower was constructed in the year 1862 as inscribed in the walls of the said watchtower. The town of Malitbog was created on December 14, 1849, and was later on reorganized under the provisions of the Maura Law of 1893 the territorial limits covered nineteen (19) kilometers to the south of the Poblacion including the island of Limasawa.

In 1897, a one-storey building in baroque style was constructed at the left side of the demarcation line also equidistant from the Catholic Church and the watchtower. The said building was believed to be the seat of government during the Spanish Regime. No traces could be found as to the name of the first governadorcillo, though at a later time prior to the Spanish–American War, there were capitanes known in the locality by the name of Capitan Tonio Base and Capitan Esteban Piramide. During the American Regime, the town was reorganized under the provision of Act. No. 82 passed by the Second Philippine Commission in 1900. This Act was known as the Municipal Code and the First Municipal President of Malitbog was Francisco Escaño. A house owned by a certain Macabuhay located at the corner of Calle Real and a street now known as Lopez Jaena served as the Municipal Hall and was later transferred to another private house owned by a certain Chinese merchant at the corner of Calle Real and a street now known as Mayor Vaño Street.

The American Regime in the early 1900s was marked with the establishment of public elementary schools. One of the school buildings was constructed near the old building built in baroque style during the Spanish era. This old building was later on made into a Municipal Hall. When the enrolment in the school increased, the newly constructed house could no longer accommodate the students until the local government came into agreement with the school authorities to exchange places. And so the Municipal Hall was transferred for the fourth time to the public school building until at present which remain to the seat of the Local Government Unit of Malitbog. In 1957 during the incumbency of President Carlos P. Garcia, several barrios in the southern portion of Malitbog including the island of Limasawa was created into a separate town as the municipality of Padre Burgos by virtue of an Executive Order No. 265. Fourteen (14) years later, the northern portion of Malitbog was declared into another town known as the municipality of Tomas Oppus, previously known as Santiago through the Act of Congress No. 5777 and further amended by Presidential Decree No. 134. Presently, the municipality has 37 barangays; 21 of which are coastal, 4 are inland and 12 are mountain barangays.

== Geography ==
The municipality of Malitbog is located in the southern part of the island of Leyte. It is in the western coast of Sogod Bay and is bounded on the southeast by the municipalities of Macrohon and Maasin City, the latter being the capital of Southern Leyte, on the north by the municipality of Tomas Oppus and on the south by the municipality of Padre Burgos. It is two 228 kilometres (142 mi) away from Tacloban City, the regional center of Region VIII. It can be reached by bus and other public utility vehicles and privately owned ones with a travel time of 40 minutes to one 1 hour to and from Maasin City, and 30–40 minutes to Sogod. It takes about 2–4 hours to and from Malitbog to Tacloban City.

=== Barangays ===
Malitbog is politically subdivided into 37 barangays. Each barangay consists of puroks and some have sitios.

- Abgao
- Asuncion
- Aurora
- Benit
- Caaga
- Cabul-anonan (Poblacion)(people call this Tondo)
- Cadaruhan
- Candatag
- Cantamuac
- Caraatan
- Concepcion
- Guinabonan
- Iba
- Lambonao
- Maningning
- Maujo
- Pasil (Poblacion)
- Sabang
- San Antonio (Poblacion)
- San Isidro
- Santo Niño
- San Jose
- San Roque
- San Vicente
- Sangahon
- Santa Cruz
- Taliwa (Poblacion)
- Tigbawan I
- Tigbawan II
- Timba
- Asuncion
- Cadaruhan Sur
- Fatima
- Juangon
- Kauswagan
- Mahayahay
- New Katipunan
- Pancil

=== Climate ===
Climate data for Malitbog, Southern Leyte
Month	Jan	Feb	Mar	Apr	May	Jun	Jul	Aug	Sep	Oct	Nov	Dec	Year
Mean daily maximum °C (°F)	28 (82)	28 (82)	29 (84)	31 (88)	31 (88)	31 (88)	30 (86)	30 (86)	30 (86)	29 (84)	29 (84)	28 (82)	30 (85)
Mean daily minimum °C (°F)	23 (73)	23 (73)	23 (73)	24 (75)	24 (75)	25 (77)	24 (75)	24 (75)	24 (75)	24 (75)	24 (75)	23 (73)	24 (75)
Average precipitation mm (inches)	98 (3.9)	82 (3.2)	96 (3.8)	71 (2.8)	104 (4.1)	129 (5.1)	101 (4.0)	94 (3.7)	99 (3.9)	135 (5.3)	174 (6.9)	143 (5.6)	1,326 (52.3)
Average rainy days	18.0	14.1	17.1	16.8	23.7	25.7	25.8	23.3	24.4	25.9	24.0	20.6	259.4
Source: Meteoblue

== Demographics ==
Population census of Malitbog
Year	Pop.	±% p.a.
1903	11,034	—
1918	15,729	+2.39%
1939	22,259	+1.67%
1948	25,891	+1.69%
1960	22,937	−1.00%
1970	14,373	−4.56%
1975	15,837	+1.96%
1980	16,114	+0.35%
1990	15,946	−0.10%
1995	17,976	+2.27%
2000	19,320	+1.56%
2007	20,104	+0.55%
2010	22,009	+3.35%
2015	22,923	+0.78%
2020	23,256	+0.30%
2024	21,691	−1.66%
Source: Philippine Statistics Authority

== Economy ==
Poverty incidence of Malitbog (%)

Source: Philippine Statistics Authority

== Notable personalities ==
- Ruperto Kangleon
- Iliff David Richardson
