= Southern Leyte =

Southern Leyte Habagatang Leyte (Cebuano) Salatan nga Leyte (Waray) Timog Leyte (Filipino)
- Province
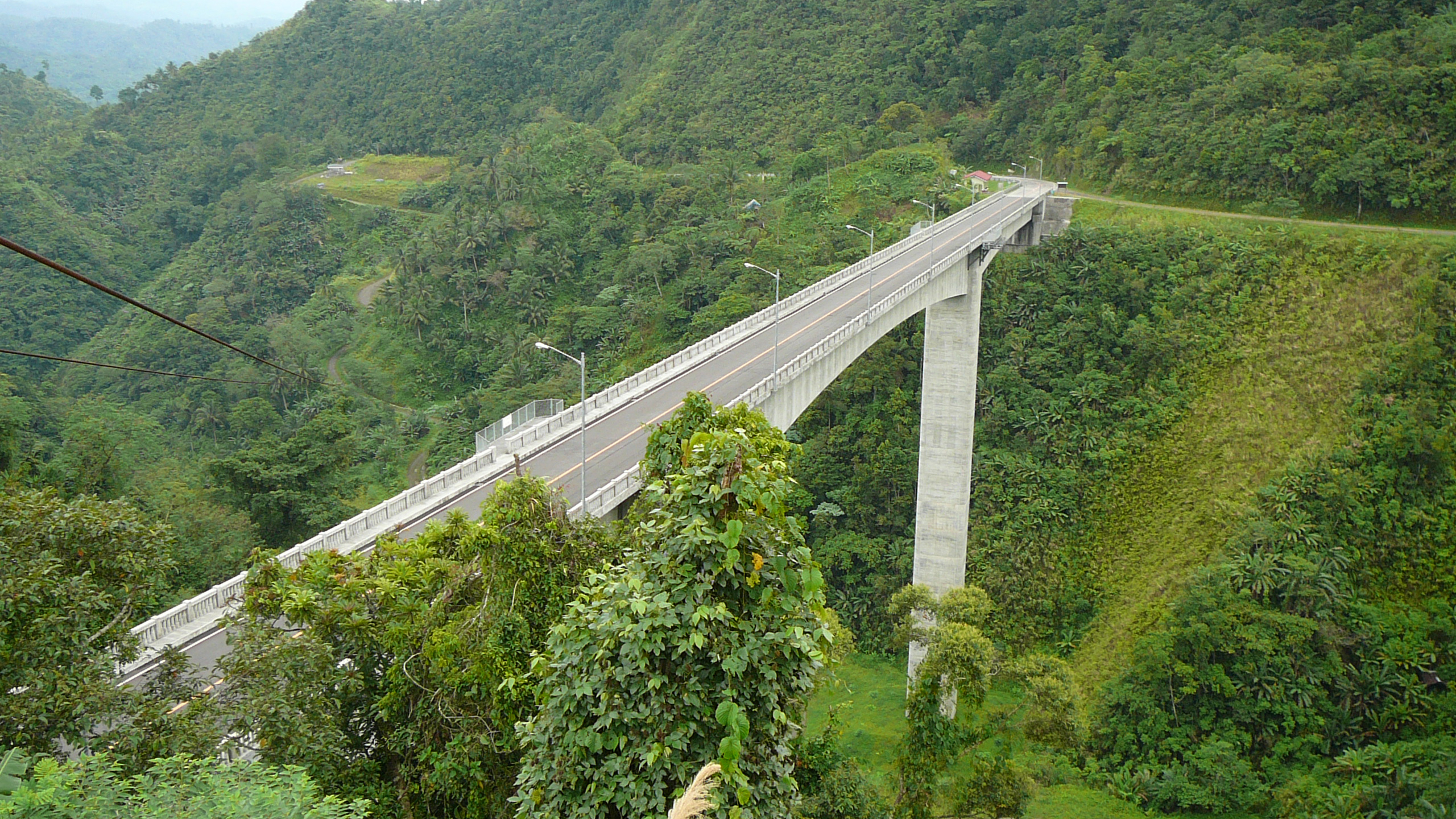
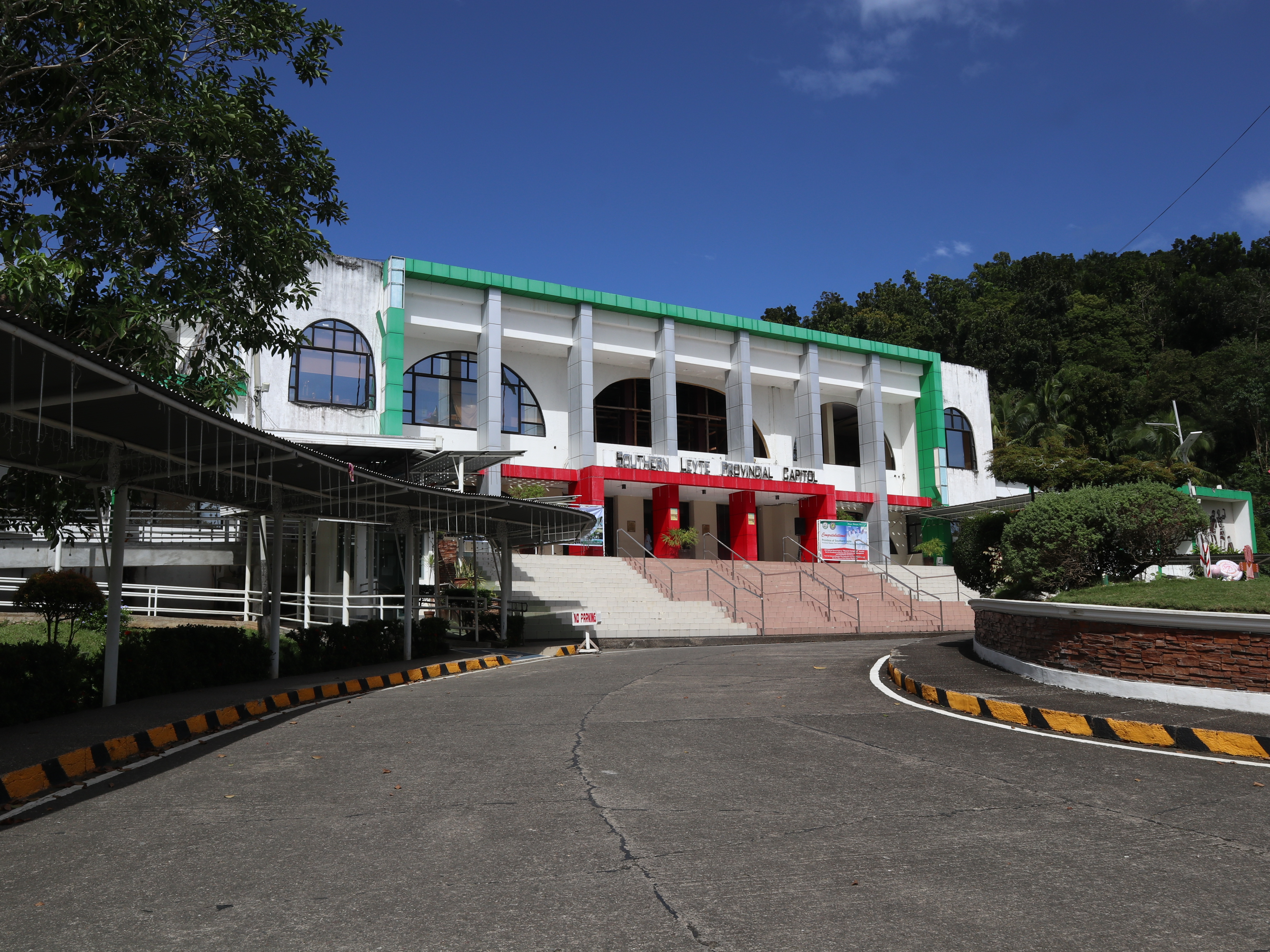
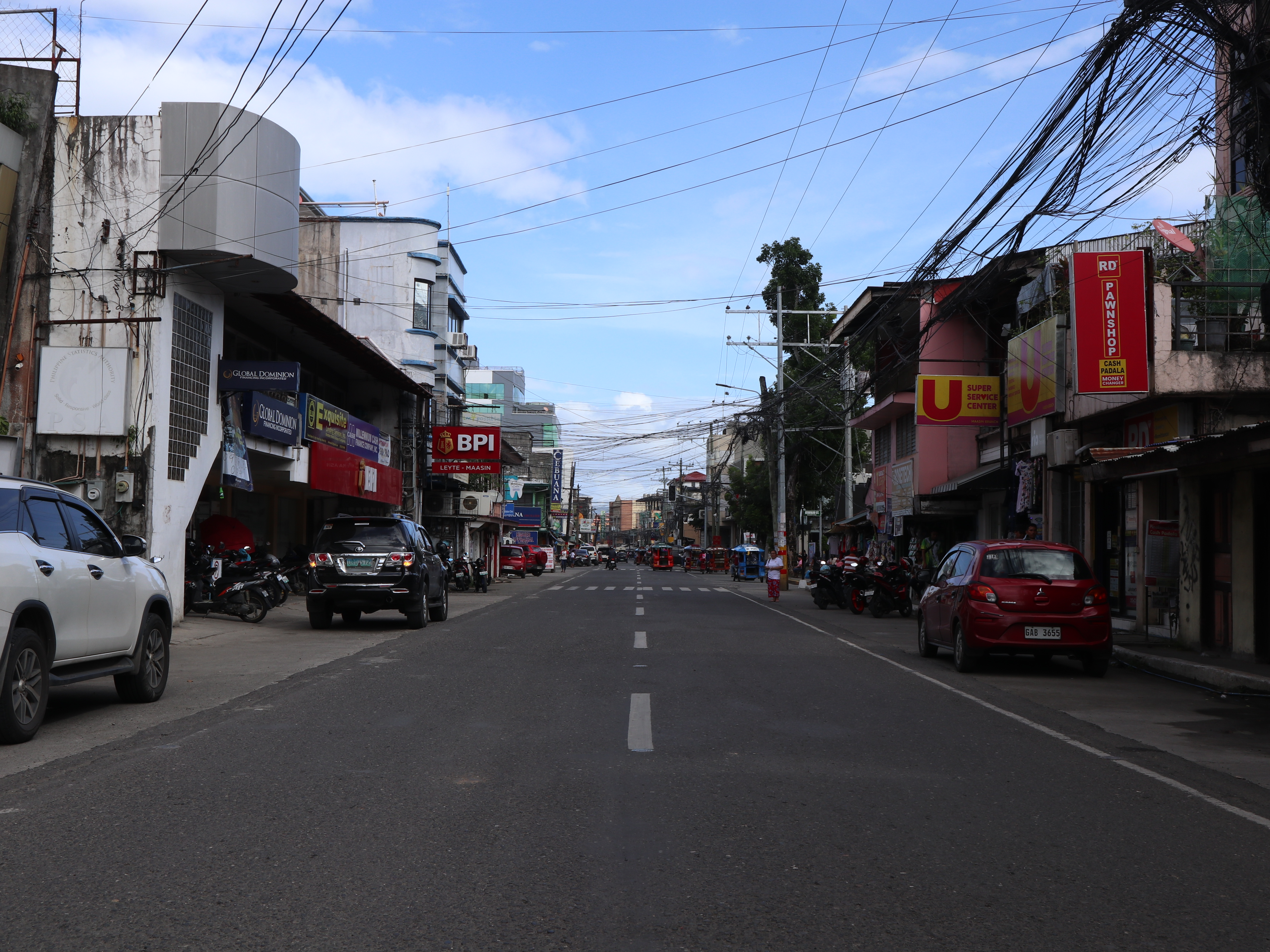
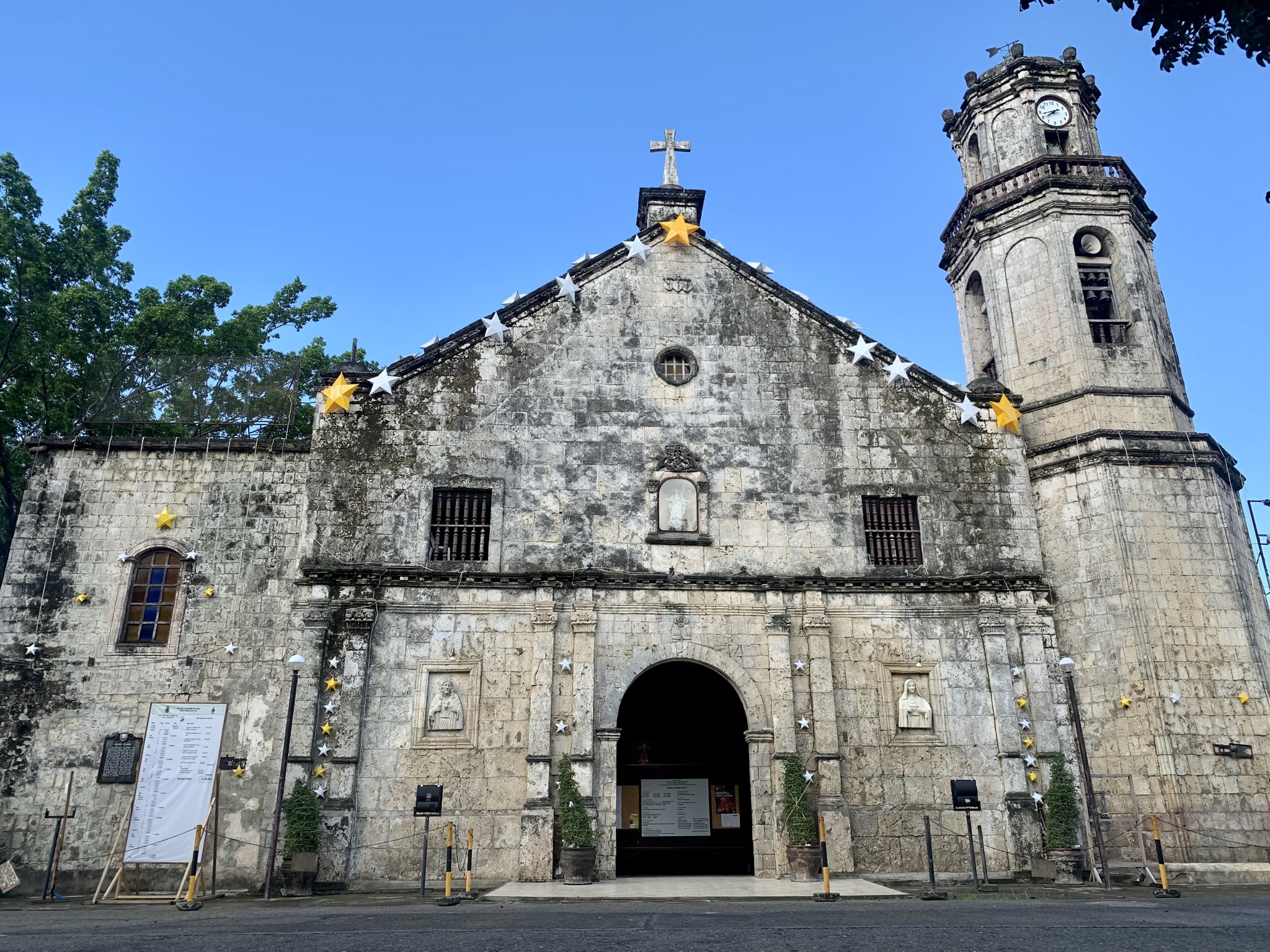
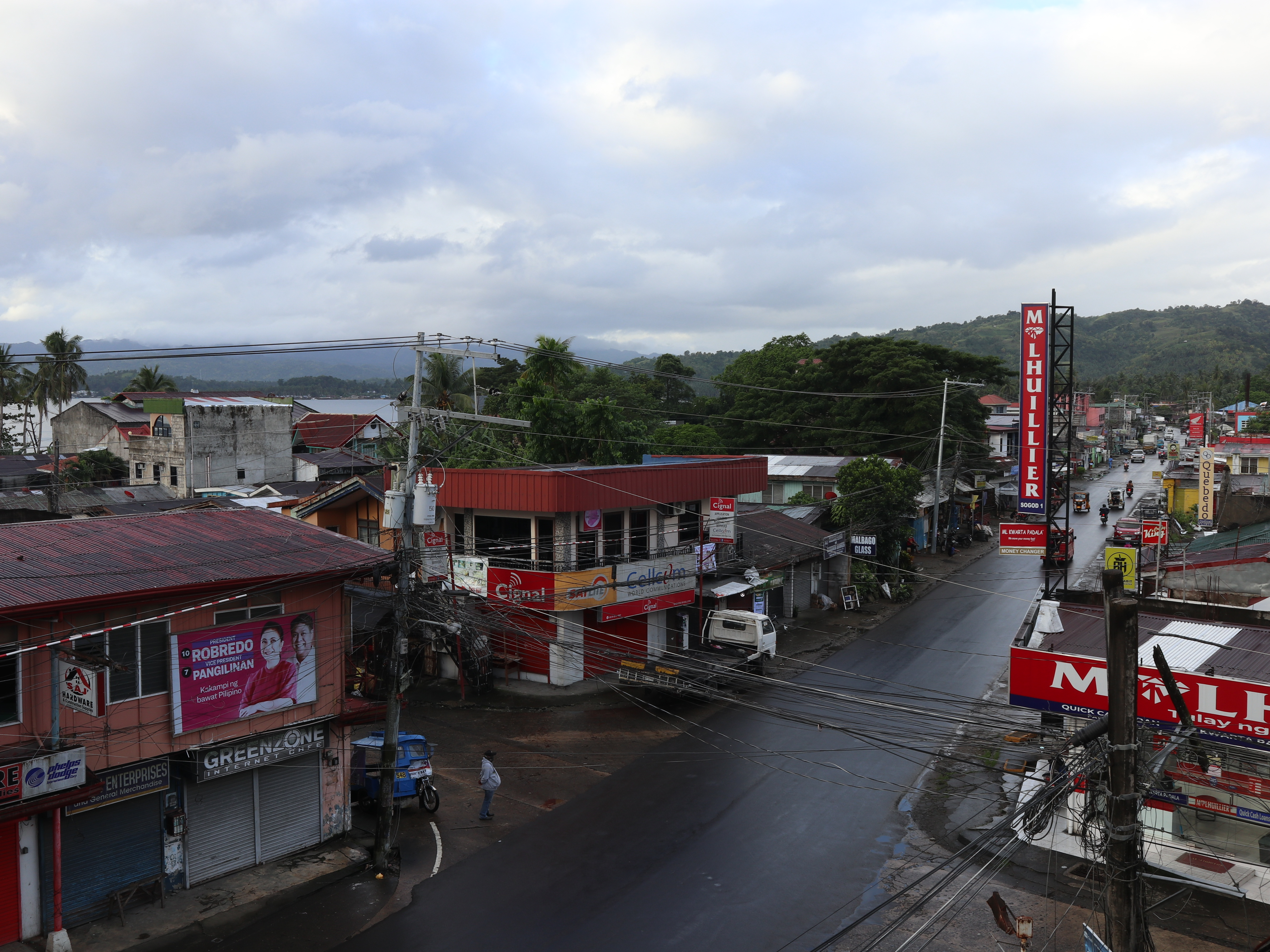
- (from top: left to right) Agas-Agas Bridge, Southern Leyte Provincial Capitol, Maasin downtown, Maasin Cathedral, and Sogod town proper

- Flag Seal

- Location in the Philippines
- Interactive map of Southern Leyte
- Coordinates: 10°20′N 125°05′E
- Country: Philippines
- Region: Eastern Visayas
- Founded: May 22, 1959
- Capital and largest city: Maasin

Government
  - Type: Sangguniang Panlalawigan
  - Governor: Damian G. Mercado (Lakas-CMD)
  - Vice Governor: Rosa Emilia G. Mercado (Lakas-CMD)
  - Legislature: Southern Leyte Provincial Board Members: 1st ProvDist; Jonathan Lee P. Maraon; Alan Jose K. Aroy; Teopisto C. Rojas Jr.; Rolito D. Manalo; 2nd ProvDist; Napoleon P. Regis; Rolando Q. Bacoy; Roque Damian A. Dator; Jason C. Calva
  - Electorate: 300,005 voters (2025)

Area
  - Total: 1,798.61 km^{2} (694.45 sq mi)
  - Rank: 65th out of 82
- Highest elevation (Mount Bitanjuan): 965 m (3,166 ft)

Population (2024 census)
  - Total: 434,372
  - Rank: 63rd out of 82
  - Density: 241.504/km^{2} (625.493/sq mi)
  - Rank: 40th out of 82
  - Households: 100,876

Divisions
  - Independent cities: 0
  - Component cities: 1: Maasin
  - Municipalities: 18: Anahawan; Bontoc; Hinunangan; Hinundayan; Libagon; Liloan; Limasawa; Macrohon; Malitbog; Padre Burgos; Pintuyan; Saint Bernard; San Francisco; San Juan; San Ricardo; Silago; Sogod; Tomas Oppus
  - Barangays: 500
  - Districts: Legislative Districts of Southern Leyte

Economy
  - Income class: 1st provincial income class
  - Poverty incidence: 7.1% (2023)
  - Revenue: ₱ 1,643 million (2024)
  - Assets: ₱ 8,162 million (2024)
  - Expenditure: ₱ 1,361 million (2024)
  - Liabilities: ₱ 2,254 million (2024)
- Time zone: UTC+8 (PHT)
- PSGC: 086400000
- IDD : area code: +63 (0)53
- ISO 3166 code: PH-SLE
- Spoken languages: Cebuano; Waray; Baybayanon; Kinabalian; Tagalog; English
- Website: www.southernleyte.gov.ph

Southern Leyte (Cebuano: Habagatang Leyte; Kabalian: Habagatan nga Leyte; Waray: Salatan nga Leyte; Tagalog: Timog Leyte), officially the Province of Southern Leyte, is a province in the Philippines located in the Eastern Visayas region. Its capital and largest city is Maasin. Southern Leyte comprised the third congressional district Leyte until it was made into an independent province in 1959. Southern Leyte includes Limasawa, an island to the south where the first Mass in Philippine soil is believed to have taken place and thus considered to be the birthplace of Christianity in the Philippines.

The province ranks as the second least populated in the region, after the province of Biliran. According to the 2024 census, the province has a population of 434,372.

Southern Leyte's geological features created several issues in the province after the flooding of the Subangdaku River and the 2006 mudslide in Guinsaugon. Organizations warned the province it was susceptible to natural occurrences like landslides and floods.

Southern Leyte forms an important part of the inter-island transportation system of the country, with ferries transporting people and goods between Liloan and Surigao del Norte in Mindanao. The province is well known for its quality abaca products and is the country's major producer of abaca fiber.

In September 2017, Representative Roger Mercado authored House Bill 6408, proposing to change the name of the province to Leyte del Sur.

== History ==
=== Early history ===
The province, being part of Leyte island, is believed to be influenced by Datu Ete, ruler of the historic community of Mairete, meaning Land of Ete, which was centered in Tacloban. The area which is to be Southern Leyte is believed to have been occupied by animist Visayan ethnic groups from Bohol. There is no proof that the indigenous animist Warays of Samar, who at the time occupied northeast Leyte, ever occupied Southern Leyte.

=== Spanish colonial era ===
As early as 1898 during the Spanish and American periods, there existed a "sub-province" consisting of the municipalities from Palompon to Hinunangan, with Maasin as the center. Some government offices had already been established in Maasin on the southwestern part of Leyte to govern the area.

Historically, the governing city was the depository of cedula tax collections from Palompon to Hinunangan. This was administered by the office of the Administrado de Hacienda, equivalent to the Provincial Treasurer, a position under the Secretario de Hacienda.

There was also established in Maasin a Court of First Instance, then known as the Promoter Fiscal, where all minor administrative and other cases from Palompon to Hinunangan were heard.

During the Spanish colonization, the province was sparsely populated. The continued raiding of Moro slaves discouraged the province from growing and developing. However, in the 19th century immigrants from adjacent provinces like Bohol and Cebu populated the area.

=== Japanese occupation ===
In 1942, Ruperto Kangleon held a conference in the town of Sogod, when the first meeting attempt in Malitbog, a town to the east, failed due to many leaders staying away. He was trying to unify all guerrillas helping the Philippine Commonwealth troops during World War II.

From 1944 to 1945, the Allied Philippine Commonwealth Army soldiers and Filipino guerrillas attacked the Japanese Imperial forces in an effort to liberate Southern Leyte, and American troops landed on Leyte on October 20, 1944.

=== Philippine independence ===
==== Independent province ====
Due to a change of sovereign powers, all the offices in Maasin except the Fiscal's Office were abolished and reverted to Tacloban, the capital of Leyte. This created a major problem because of the dearth of transportation, the difficulty in managing the affairs of government in Tacloban and the language barrier between the Cebuano-speaking South-westerners and the Waray-speaking North-easterners. The difficulty of managing the entire island from the main city suggested a need to separate the island into two provinces.

At first there was a general movement for a Western Leyte and soon after, many prominent men and leaders rallied behind the movement. Six attempts to pass a law for the division of Leyte were made. On the sixth attempt, then Congressman Nicanor Yñiguez introduced into the House a division law similar in substance to that of the Kangleon Bill, but recognizing the impossibility of creating an East-West Division, he instead opted to make his own district a province.

Abandoning the first bill, Congressman Nicanor Yñiguez presented House Bill No. 1318 proposing a new province of Southern Leyte comprising Third Congressional District of Leyte to include sixteen municipalities, from Maasin to Silago in the mainland, and in the Panaon Island.

The bill became Republic Act 2227 otherwise known as an "Act Creating the Province of Southern Leyte" and was signed into Law by President Carlos P. Garcia on May 22, 1959. On July 1, 1960, Southern Leyte was inaugurated as a province with sixteen municipalities and Maasin as the capital town. Thus, the third District of Leyte became the Province of Southern Leyte and the Lone District of Southern Leyte.

=== Contemporary ===
==== Mudslides ====
In December 2003, a landslide in San Francisco, Southern Leyte destroyed most of the town, killing 200 people.

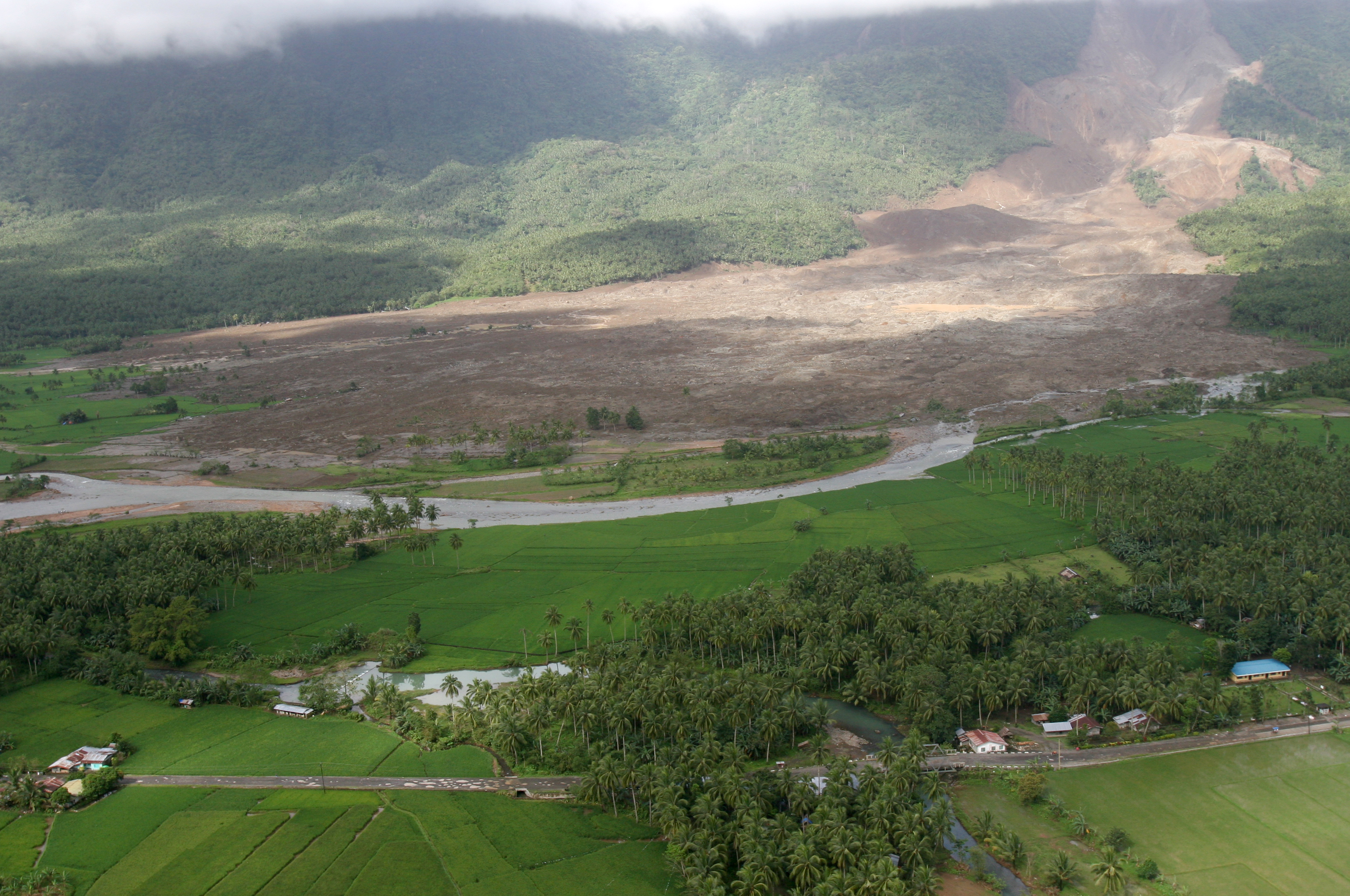
2006 Southern Leyte mudslide

On February 17, 2006, several mudslides caused by heavy rains, amounting over 200 cm (79 in), and a minor earthquake destroyed at least one town and many commercial and residential infrastructures, leaving hundreds dead. The municipality of Saint Bernard was one of the worst hit areas with 23 confirmed deaths, up to 200 estimated deaths and another 1,500 missing. Barangay Guinsaugon, a mountain village on the said municipality with 2,500 people, was almost completely destroyed, killing 1,800 of its 1,857 residents. Many rescuers from national and international responded to the incident. However, rescue efforts were greatly hampered by poor road conditions and lack of heavy equipment. Survivors also reported lack of coordination of rescue efforts. The few handful of Guinsaugon citizens which escaped the mudslide were put up in emergency shelters without adequate nutrition and care despite the National Government collecting millions of dollars' worth of donations.

== Geography ==
Southern Leyte occupies the southern quarter of the island of Leyte. It is bounded by the province of Leyte to the north, by Surigao Strait to the east, Bohol Sea to the south, and Canigao Channel, across from Bohol, to the west. Its total land area is 1,798.61 square kilometres (694.45 sq mi). The central portion of the province is dominated by the Sogod Bay, a long bay that cuts deep into the island.

=== Topography ===
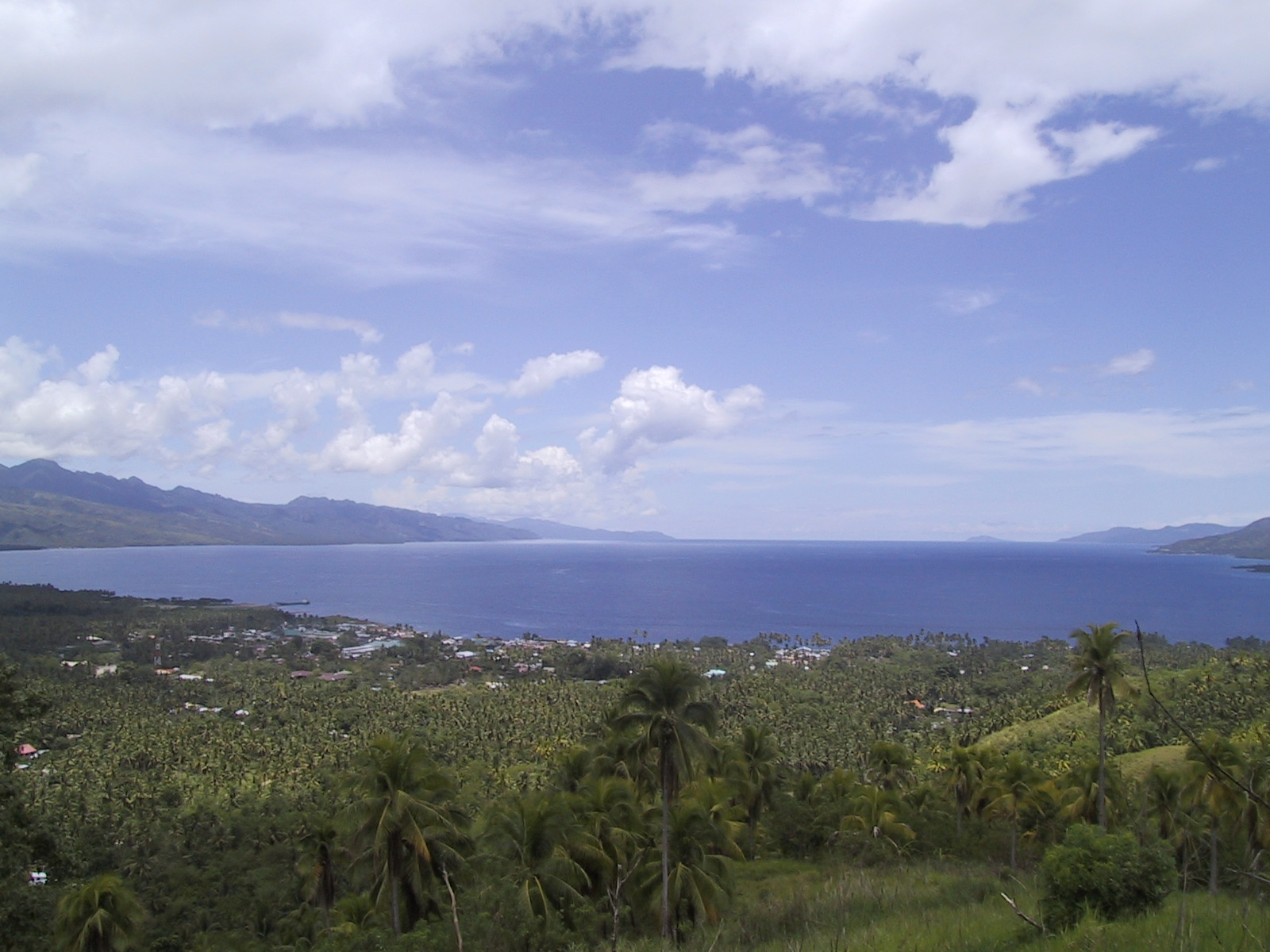
A view of Sogod Bay and the town of Sogod

Southern Leyte is characterized by rugged mountains towards the interior, but relatively flat lands along the coastal areas where population centers lie.

The province has inland water features. Based on national data, the province has altogether 93 rivers, including 18 major ones, namely the Amparo River in Macrohon, the Canturing River in Maasin, the Das-ay and Pondol Rivers in Hinunangan, the Divisoria River in Bontoc, the Hitungao and Lawigan Rivers in Saint Bernard, the Maag River in Silago, and the Subangdaku River in Sogod which is the biggest of all. The province has an inland lake called Lake Danao located in the mountains of San Juan and Anahawan, towns in the eastern region.

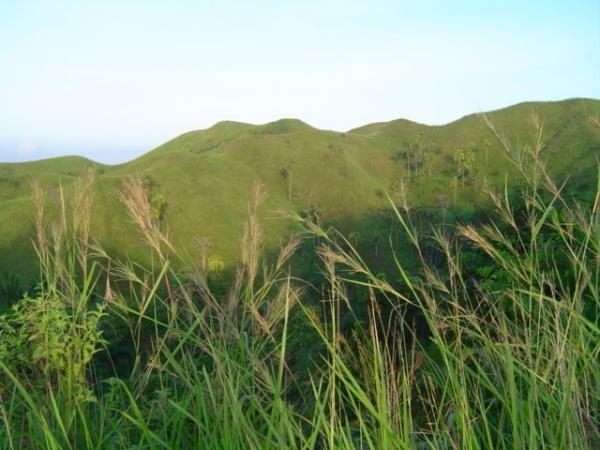
Green grass covering mountains in Maasin

Subangdaku, the province's largest river, created an issue over the area. It can be considered a braided river composed of several channels from near areas that divide and reunite forming an alluvial fan with a very wide floodplain. As such, the river usually became hazardous during typhoons after heavy rains. The river has overflowed, spilling its waters on the low-lying towns of Liloan and San Vicente and destroyed an ongoing flood control project worth millions of pesos. The river meanders along its course, ever changing its way over time. During the time it floods, it destroys every side of its course. In 2001, portions of the road and banks in Barangay San Miguel along the river were destroyed, including part of the Philippine National Road. Local officials blamed the rechannelization and uncontrolled quarrying of gravel and sand at the side of the river as the cause of the flood. At a meeting on March 18, 2002, one of the representatives of a government agency alleged that the reason of the incidents of flood and other environmental problems in the river was due to the "Philippine Fault" which caused rocks to rumble down. However, the reason was contended because the fault is a geological feature and environmental problems in the province just occurred that time.

Along with other mountain forms in the province, Mount Nacolod in Hinunangan town has the highest peak with an elevation of 948 metres (3,110 ft) above sea level. Young volcanic rocks are discovered in the terrain areas, which cover the top of the southern mountain ranges of Mount Cabalian in the Pacific Area and Mount Nelangcapan in Panaon Area.

The province lies within the Philippine Fault System. The major fault lines traverse the municipalities of Sogod, Libagon, Saint Bernard and San Juan to Panaon Island. Based on Mines and Geosciences Bureau Region 8 data, these areas had experienced strong earthquakes in 1907 and 1948 with a magnitude of 6.9 and on July 5, 1984, with a 6.4 scale. The Mines and Geosciences Bureau warned that Southern Leyte's natural and geological features make it susceptible to landslides and floodings. The affiliated group stated that there are four contributory reasons: unusually heavy rains; numerous faults and badly broken rocks; steep slopes; and absence of effective vegetative cover.

The province has numerous types of soil. Soil types within the Maasin Clay, Guimbalaon Clay, Himay-angan Clay, Bolinao Clay, Quingua Clay and Malitbog Clay series serve as raw materials for ceramics and pottery made by local residents.

=== Climate ===
Southern Leyte has two types of climate according to the Coronas Classification. These are Type II and Type IV.

Type II is characterized by the absence of dry season with a very pronounced maximum rain period occurring from November to January. This type prevails in the eastern half of the province that includes the municipality of Sogod, Libagon, Liloan, San Francisco, Pintuyan, San Ricardo, Saint Bernard, San Juan, Anahawan, Hinundayan, Hinunangan and Silago. On the other hand, Type IV has a rainfall that is more or less evenly distributed throughout the year. This type prevails in the western part of the province that includes the City of Maasin and the municipalities of Macrohon, Padre Burgos, Limasawa, Malitbog, Tomas Oppus, Bontoc and little part of Sogod.

In 2004, the province recorded a maximum temperature of 30.95 °C (87.71 °F) and a minimum temperature of 24.09 °C (75.36 °F). In addition, mean minimum temperature was 25.24 °C (77.43 °F). The province has 163 rainy days per year and total rainfall of 1,729.20 millimetres (68.079 in).

=== Vegetation and biodiversity ===
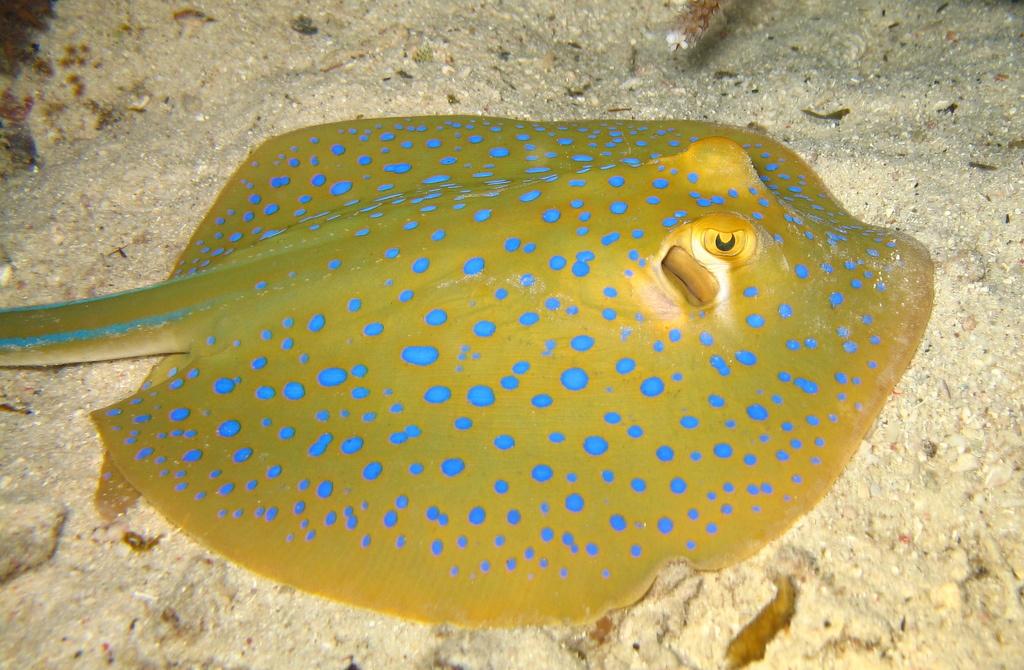
A bluespotted stingray seen in the coasts of the province

Inhabitants of the province plant rice, white corn, bananas, root crops, sugar cane, coconut and abacá. They also plant various types of vegetables.

A three-year project was established in Sogod Bay conducted by the Southern Leyte Coral Reef Conservation Project (SLCRCP) to surveyed coral reefs in the area. The undertaking was to provide local residents educational opportunities to have knowledge on protecting the province's biodiversity as well as to have a long-term sustainability.

=== Administrative divisions ===
Southern Leyte is subdivided into 18 municipalities and 1 city, all encompassed by a double legislative districts and further subdivided into 500 barangays.

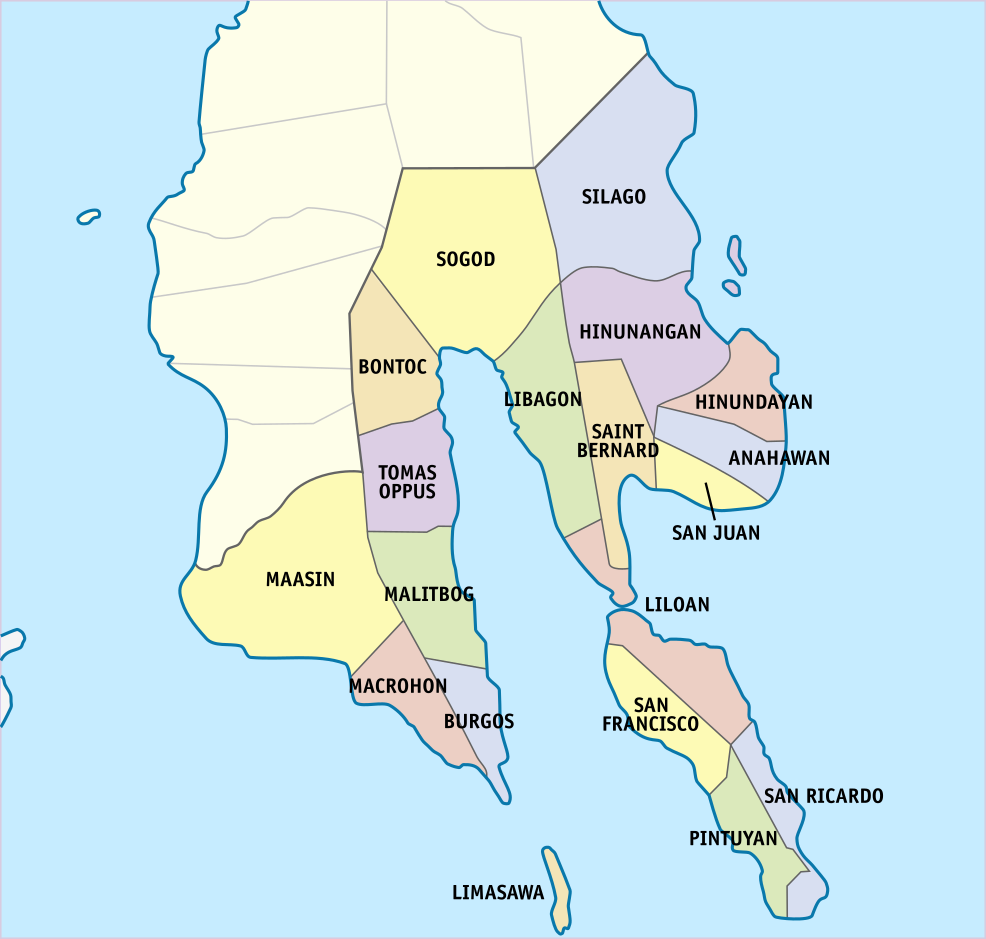
Political divisions of Southern Leyte

The province originally comprised 16 municipalities and 349 barangays, with four islands: Panaon Island, Limasawa Island, San Pedro Island and San Pablo Island. After the inauguration of the province, three more municipalities were subsequently created: San Ricardo from Pintuyan, Tomas Oppus from Malitbog and Limasawa from Padre Burgos.

In 2000, Maasin was converted into a city as capital of Southern Leyte. The remaining component municipality classes ranges from 2nd to 5th level in the province. From 2nd class belongs Sogod municipality which is the center of trade, commerce and industry among municipalities within the Sogod Bay. Hinunangan, which holds the distinction as the "Rice Granary of the Province" for its vast plain land that is entirely planted with rice, Liloan, Malitbog, Saint Bernard, and Macrohon, are in the 4th level. The remaining municipalities—Anahawan, Hinundayan, Libagon, Padre Burgos, Pintuyan, San Francisco, San Juan (formerly Cabalian), San Ricardo, Silago, Tomas Oppus and Limasawa, a component island to the south—are under 5th level.

City or municipality (Note: Former names are italicized.) (Note: The globe icon marks the city/town center.)		Population			±% p.a.	Area		Density (2020)		Barangay
		(2020)		(2015)		km^{2}	sq mi	/km^{2}	/sq mi	
Anahawan		2.0%	8,429	8,211	+0.50%	58.09	22.43	150	390	14
Bontoc		6.9%	29,799	28,905	+0.58%	102.10	39.42	290	750	40
Hinunangan		6.8%	29,149	29,976	−0.53%	170.58	65.86	170	440	40
Hinundayan		2.9%	12,398	12,285	+0.17%	59.90	23.13	210	540	17
Libagon		3.5%	15,244	15,169	+0.09%	98.62	38.08	150	390	14
Liloan		5.8%	24,800	23,981	+0.64%	50.30	19.42	490	1,300	24
Limasawa		1.4%	6,191	6,061	+0.40%	6.98	2.69	890	2,300	6
Maasin City	†	20.4%	87,446	85,560	+0.42%	211.71	81.74	410	1,100	70
Macrohon		6.2%	26,580	26,244	+0.24%	126.39	48.80	210	540	30
Malitbog		5.4%	23,256	22,923	+0.27%	74.97	28.95	310	800	37
Padre Burgos		2.6%	11,159	11,091	+0.12%	25.65	9.90	440	1,100	11
Pintuyan		2.4%	10,202	9,826	+0.72%	36.98	14.28	280	730	23
Saint Bernard		6.6%	28,414	28,395	+0.01%	100.20	38.69	280	730	30
San Francisco		3.1%	13,436	13,402	+0.05%	68.60	26.49	200	520	22
San Juan (Cabalian)		3.5%	14,912	14,858	+0.07%	96.12	37.11	160	410	18
San Ricardo		2.4%	10,500	10,494	+0.01%	47.56	18.36	220	570	15
Silago		3.1%	13,116	12,775	+0.50%	215.05	83.03	61	160	15
Sogod		11.1%	47,552	44,986	+1.06%	192.70	74.40	250	650	45
Tomas Oppus		4.0%	16,990	16,608	+0.43%	56.11	21.66	300	780	29
Total			429,573	421,750	+0.35%	1,798.61	694.45	240	620	500
	† Provincial capital and component city					Municipality				

== Demographics ==
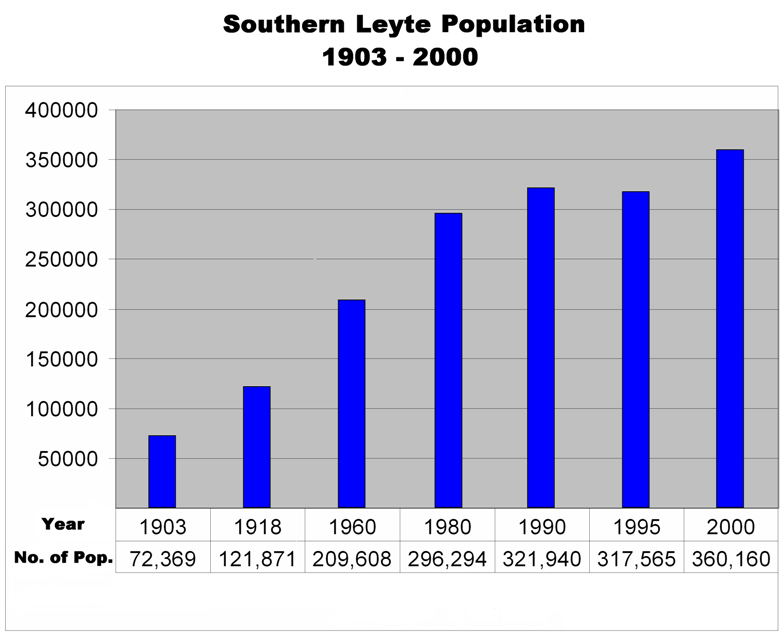
A graphical presentation of Southern Leyte's 1903–2000 population depicting the negative growth rate in 1999‑2000 records

Population census of Southern Leyte

Year	Pop.	±% p.a.
1903	72,369	—
1918	121,871	+3.54%
1939	172,552	+1.67%
1948	187,581	+0.93%
1960	209,608	+0.93%
1970	251,425	+1.83%

Year	Pop.	±% p.a.
1975	276,418	+1.92%
1980	296,294	+1.40%
1990	321,940	+0.83%
1995	317,565	−0.26%
2000	360,160	+2.73%
2007	390,847	+1.13%

Year	Pop.	±% p.a.
2010	399,137	+0.77%
2015	421,750	+1.06%
2020	429,573	+0.39%
2024	434,372	+0.27%

Source: Philippine Statistics Authority

The population of Southern Leyte in the 2024 census was 434,372 people, with a density of 240 inhabitants per square kilometre or 620 inhabitants per square mile.

The 1980 national census recorded the province of Southern Leyte with a population of 296,294 from the historic record in 1903 of 72,369. In 1990, the population of the province increased to 321,940 which was caused by in-migration and increasing rate of birth over death. In 2000, population increased to 360,160 with a rate of 2.73 from the negative growth rate recorded in 1995 period with 317,565. The sudden decrease of the 1995 records was due to the late census in the province. While regular censuses were done in May where most of the students were at their respective places of residence, in 1995 the census of the population was done in September where the students were out for schooling in nearby provinces. The decrease in population was also, theoretically, attributed to out-migration of the rural population to cities to seek better employment and livelihood opportunities. A corresponding increase on the number of households was also recorded at 72,894 households higher by 7,327 households over the 1995 figure. Southern Leyte ranked fifth in terms of population among the six provinces in Eastern Visayas with 9.98 percent of the 3.6 million persons of the region. On the contrary, it was the fastest-growing province in the region. At the national level, the province contributed 0.47 percent to the total population of the Philippines with 76.5 million.

=== Ethnicity ===
Population by ethnicity (2000)
Ethnicity	Number
Bisaya	290,460 (80.74%)
Boholano	45,458 (12.64%)
Cebuano	18,543 (5.15%)
Waray	711 (0.20%)
Tagalog	536 (0.15%)
Others	2,689 (0.75%)
Other foreign ethnicity	76 (0.02%)
Not Reported	1,265 (0.35%)

According to the 2000 census survey, of the total provincial population of 359,738, about 80.74% (290,460) were Bisaya, 12.64% (45,458) Boholano, 5.15% (18,543) Cebuano, 0.2% (711) Tagalogs, and 0.15% (536) Waray.

In Panaon, an island situated in the southernmost part of the province, a certain aboriginal folk are found locally known as kongking or variously called mamanwa which means "mountain people". They were believed to be migrants from Mindanao, inhabiting the portions of Agusan, after their migration from the island to evade militarization and the logging/mining corporations’ intrusion to their ancestral domains in the early 1980s. They have a dark complexion and curly hair, and they are short in stature. Hunting and gathering, mat weaving and rattan craft are among the main economic activities of the Mamanwas, so they prefer to inhabit the forested areas in the newfound Southern Leyte mountains. However, they were again displaced by the recent landslides in the province.

=== Language ===
The native language is a Boholano dialect variant of Cebuano. Waray is sometimes spoken (concentrated in some barrios near Waray speaking towns such as Abuyog and Mahaplag), while Tagalog and English are used as second languages. Kinabalian, a type of "rare, unique language", is spoken alongside Cebuano in the towns of San Juan and Anahawan.

=== Religion ===
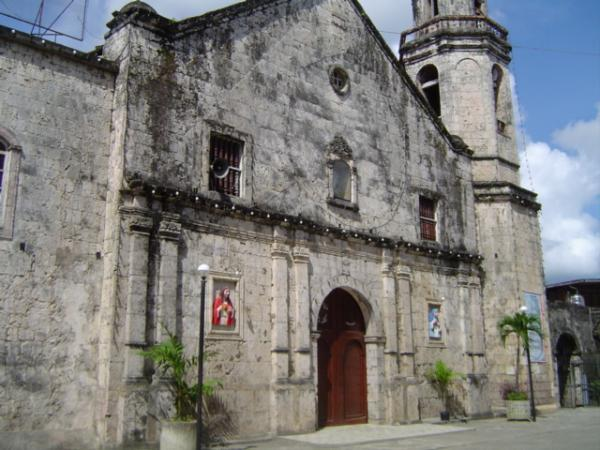
Our Lady of Assumption Cathedral in Maasin

Limasawa, an island municipality to the south, is believed to be the site of the first Christian mass in Philippine soil and the birthplace of Christianity in the Philippines, when Ferdinand Magellan, a Portuguese navigator and explorer landed on March 28, 1521. The first Holy Sacrifice of the Mass was held on March 31, 1521, led by Friar Pedro de Valderrama, the chaplain of Ferdinand Magellan during the expedition. The mass marked the start of Christian propagation.

== Culture ==
=== Beliefs ===
Although most people are Christians, a very few who live in remote villages of the province hold on to pre-Hispanic influences and make offerings and sacrifices before planting their crops. Farmers ritually sacrifice chickens and pigs to ensure that the spirits or elementals which they believe to be the cause of good harvest will grant them one.

=== Religious events ===
Fiesta, a Spanish term meaning "festivity", is celebrated in the province with prayer, food, drinking, dance and music. Every barangay of every town in the province has its own celebration date. For instance, Hinunangan celebrates a town fiesta on the June 29 with the Saint Peter and Saint Paul Fluvial boat parade the day before. The kuratsa – a courtship dance-drama – highlights every occasion.

The province also holds its own festivals. "Sinulog sa malitbog" is an annual religious street pageant in Malitbog to pay homage to the Holy Child Jesus (Santo Niño), the town's patron saint. Similarly, the historic and religious coming of the Spaniards is commemorated every March 31 in Limasawa with a cultural presentation and anniversary program dubbed "Sinugdan", meaning "beginning." Other festivals held in the province to highlight events are the Pagkamugna Festival and Pabulhon Festival in Maasin, Karomata Festival in Beunavista, Pintuyan, Tangka-tangka Festival in Tangkaan, Padre Burgos and Manha‑on Festival in Macrohon.

== Economy ==
Poverty incidence of Southern Leyte (%)

Source: Philippine Statistics Authority

=== Farming ===
==== Coconut ====
Most of the people in Southern Leyte go into coconut planting, a widely distributed industry, especially in mountainous and even plain regions. The GIZ of the German Development Cooperation has embarked on a value chain study on one of the most important products in Region 8 – the coconut, particularly in Leyte and Southern Leyte.

In the year 2004, a beetle pest threatened the Philippine coconut industry including Visayas. Brontispa longissima causes great damage to seedlings and mature coconut trees and ornamental palms, killing the young spears and eventually the entire trees.

==== Abaca ====
People in Southern Leyte also go into abaca planting. The province is one of the major producer of abaca fiber in the country along with Catanduanes, Leyte, Davao Oriental, Northern Samar, Sorsogon, Sulu, Davao del Sur, and Surigao del Sur. The fibers from Leyte and the province are recognized as having the best quality. On the year 1990 to 1999, Southern Leyte produced abaca with a rate of 17 percent.

In 2003, Abaca bunchy top virus threatened the abaca industry in the province. Almost all of the abaca-producing municipalities in the area namely Maasin, Padre Burgos, Malitbog, Tomas Oppus, Bontoc, Sogod, St. Bernard, San Juan, Hinunangan and Silago were greatly affected by the deadly virus except from the municipalities at Panaon Island. Eighty percent of the province's abaca, particularly in Sogod town, was greatly affected while Maasin was estimated to suffer about 30 percent in damages.

=== Tourism ===
Some 200,000 tourists visit Southern Leyte each year.

Domestic tourism is mostly those wishing to enjoy the sandy beaches, hotels and resorts along the coastline. Significant numbers also visit for religious festivals such as Sinulog and Limasawa.

Most international travelers visit Southern Leyte for reef diving and snorkeling, from just outside Maasin City, all the way around Sogod Bay via Padre Burgos. There are also an increasing number of non-divers who come to see the whale sharks between October and April.

In recent years there has been a drive to promote tourism in the region. There is a Zoo and Wildlife Park in Barangay Danao in Maasin. In Sogod, a zip line exists over the highest bridge in the Philippines.

With this increase in numbers, there is a selection of new hotels along the coast.

=== Industries ===
Abaca fiber helps livelihood in the province. Women in the selected areas go into abaca-based handicrafts, which is widely known in the area as tagak or spooled abaca fiber. Natives usually called it as tinagak or continuous spooled abaca fiber. The half-finished product is then made into sinamay or hand woven clothe out of tinagak ready to be made into other sinamay‑based products. Products are being exported by Leyte to Japan. Because of a wide distribution of an industry called tagak, provincial sectors taught farmers on how to cultivate a suitable variety locally called laylay.

In Bontoc, a project was successfully established with a mudcrab hatchery with eleven hatchery tanks at the RKKMAFTI Compound. Initially, 25 spawners are being worked-on by the project.

Aside from abaca-based products, ceramics and handicraft items made from coconut and bamboo are also the province's industry. Among the province's economic activities are fishing, livestock and poultry raising.

Generally, rice is the staple food of the province, and corn is also used. Mountain‑living folks, however, prefer root crops, which are abundant. Native delicacies of the province include tres marias, bocarillo, 'salvaro, bibingka, and starhoy. They also have their own kinilaw.

== Government ==
Current Provincial Government Officials (2025-2028)

- Governor: Damian G. Mercado (Lakas)
- Vice-Governor: Rosa Emilia G. Mercado (Lakas)

Sangguniang Panlalawigan Members

1st District

- Jonathan Lee P. Maraon (Lakas)
- Alan Jose K. Aroy (Lakas)
- Teopisto C. Rojas Jr. (Lakas)
- Rolito D. Manalo (Reporma)

2nd District

- Napoleon P. Regis (Lakas)
- Rolando Q. Bacoy (Lakas)
- Roque Damian A. Dator (Independent)
- Jason C. Calva (Tingog)

Ex-Officio Members

- TBD (President, Liga ng mga Barangay)
- TBD (President, PCL)
- TBD (President, Panlalawigang Pederasyon ng Sangguniang Kabataan)

== House of Representatives ==
District	Representative	Party	Term	Bloc
1st	Roger G. Mercado	PFP	1	Majority
2nd	Christopherson M. Yap	NUP	2	Majority

== Infrastructure ==
=== Communication ===
Postal communication is the main mode of communication in the province. There are five telephone exchange companies operating in the province and two radio stations. These two radio stations (Radyo Natin and DYSL) are located in Sogod.

=== Transportation ===
The road network of Southern Leyte consists of major arterial highways that link the province to Leyte, passing through two major outlets. On the western part is the Maasin-Mahaplag-Baybay and the central part by the Mahaplag‑Sogod road via the Maharlika Highway. On the eastern part of the province, the opening of the new Abuyog‑Silago Roads provides fast and convenient travel to the eastern towns of Southern Leyte. Maharlika road contributes to the development of the province.

There are six designated bus terminals in Southern Leyte: Maasin, Liloan, Sogod, San Juan, Hinunangan and Silago. However, these terminals are open spaces used by buses as parking areas and are therefore not equipped with buildings and other facilities.

Southern Leyte has a total of eleven seaports, two of which are declared as national ports, the Maasin and Liloan ports, and the 10 are municipal ports. Of these 10 ports, five are operational: Maasin, Liloan, Saint Bernard, San Juan and Sogod. By sea, travel to Cebu from Maasin port takes an average of six hours and a maximum of two hours. A ferryboat from Liloan to Surigao takes three hours.

The province has one existing airport, Panan-awan Airport located in Maasin. The airport does not service any commercial flight. It has a lone passenger terminal and can only accommodate aircraft for general aviation weighing 12,000 pounds (5,400 kg) and below at daytime. It is considered a feeder airport with a total runway length of 1,200 metres (3,900 ft) and width of 30 metres (98 ft).

== Education ==
Southern Leyte has several institutions of higher education serving students from across the province. The largest public institution is Southern Leyte State University (SLSU), which operates its main campus in Sogod and satellite campuses in Bontoc, Hinunangan, San Juan, Tomas Oppus, and in the capital, Maasin City. Other colleges and universities in the province are mainly located at the capital, including The College of Maasin, Saint Joseph College, and STI College–Maasin. Private higher education institutions also include Saint James College in Padre Burgos and Saint Thomas Aquinas College in Sogod.

Basic education in the province is provided through public and private elementary and secondary schools located in its municipalities and cities.

== Notable people ==
- Ruperto Kangleon, Philippine Senator and Guerilla Warrior during World War 2 was from Macrohon, Southern Leyte.
- Rodrigo Duterte, 16th President of the Philippines (2016–2022) was born in Maasin.
- Regine Velasquez-Alcasid, singer and songwriter lived her childhood in Hinundayan, Southern Leyte.
- Cynthia Thomalla, beauty queen and actress from Macrohon, Southern Leyte.
