= Anahawan (disambiguation) =

Anahawan is a municipality in the province of Southern Leyte, Philippines.

Anahawan may also refer to:

- Anahawan, Bato, Leyte, in the province of Leyte, Philippines
- Anahawan, Sibagat, in the province of Agusan del Sur, Philippines
