= San Francisco, Southern Leyte =

Municipality in Southern Leyte, Philippines

San Francisco
- Municipality
- Municipality of San Francisco
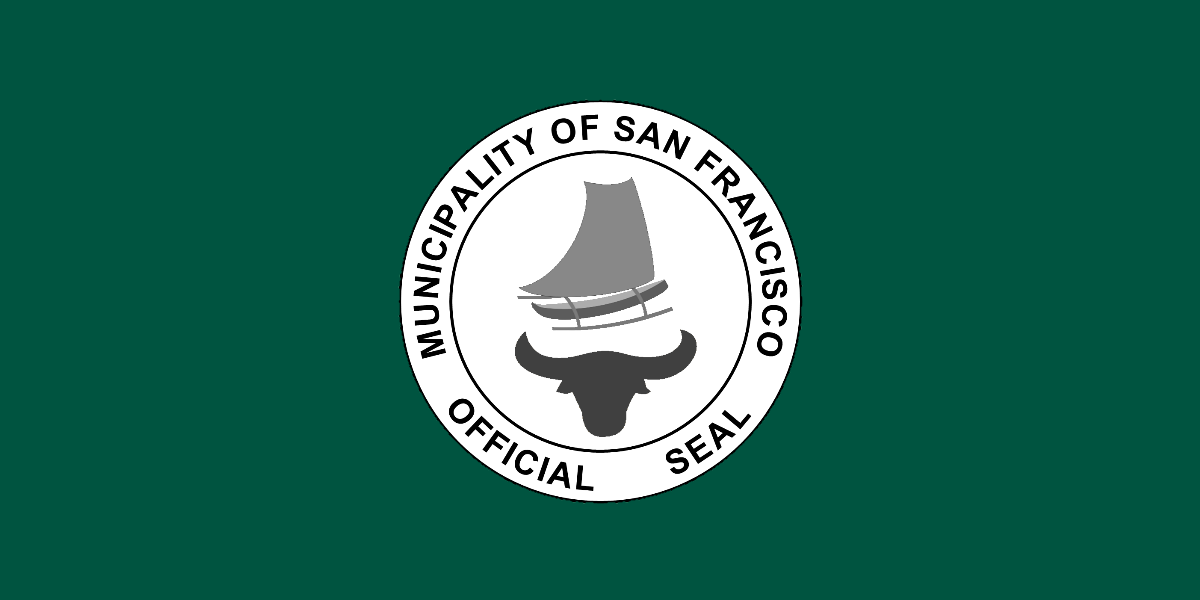
- Flag

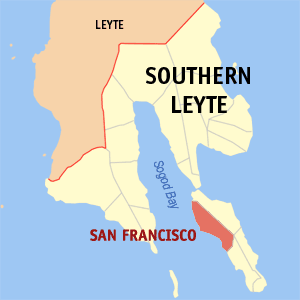
- Map of Southern Leyte with San Francisco highlighted
- Interactive map of San Francisco
- Location within the Philippines
- Coordinates: 10°03′36″N 125°09′38″E
- Country: Philippines
- Region: Eastern Visayas
- Province: Southern Leyte
- District: 2nd district
- Founded: November 1, 1949
- Inaugurated: May 14, 1951
- Named for: Francis Xavier
- Barangays: 22 (see Barangays)

Government
  - Type: Sangguniang Bayan
  - Mayor: Benedicta D. Tiaozon (PFP)
  - Vice Mayor: Rolando R. Dagami (PFP)
  - Representative: Christopherson M. Yap
  - Municipal Council: Members: Mercedita S. Dedicatoria; Leonora J. Bero; Julito R. Dagami; Marina P. Cagantas; Honorio S. Magoncia Jr.; Rolando M. Garote; Benjamin L. Micabalo; Felixberto M. Lutero Jr.
  - Electorate: 10,427 voters (2025)

Area
  - Total: 68.60 km^{2} (26.49 sq mi)
- Elevation: 137 m (449 ft)
- Highest elevation: 709 m (2,326 ft)
- Lowest elevation: 0 m (0 ft)

Population (2024 census)
  - Total: 12,897
  - Density: 188.0/km^{2} (486.9/sq mi)
  - Households: 3,300

Economy
  - Income class: 4th municipal income class
  - Poverty incidence: 19.24% (2023)
  - Revenue: ₱ 6.84 million (2024)
  - Assets: ₱ 361.5 million (2024)
  - Expenditure: ₱ 108.1 million (2024)
  - Liabilities: ₱ 96.92 million (2024)

Service provider
  - Electricity: Southern Leyte Electric Cooperative (SOLECO)
- Time zone: UTC+8 (PST)
- ZIP code: 6611
- PSGC: 0806413000
- IDD : area code: +63 (0)53
- Native languages: Boholano dialect Cebuano; Tagalog

San Francisco (IPA: [sɐn fɾɐn'sisko]), officially the Municipality of San Francisco (Cebuano: Lungsod sa San Francisco; Tagalog: Bayan ng San Francisco), is a municipality in the province of Southern Leyte, Philippines. According to the 2024 census, it has a population of 12,897 people.

== History ==
The town of San Francisco used to be part of Liloan, Southern Leyte and was created as a separate municipality on November 1, 1949 by President Elpidio Quirino through Executive Order No. 292.

People from Bohol were the early settlers that started in Habay river. They gave it the name Canlili-ug because the river's waters that time reached up to a person's neck (li-ug being the word for neck). Nowadays the river is only knee-deep.

During the Spanish period, the inhabitants became Roman Catholics and the place came to be known as San Francisco, after Saint Francis Xavier. Tradition holds that the inhabitants requested for an image of Saint Francis Xavier but got Saint Isidore's instead. At present, the town remains to be called San Francisco but venerates Saint Isidore as its Patron Saint.

On May 14, 1951, the Municipality of San Francisco was formally inaugurated with just seven barangays under its jurisdiction, namely San Francisco, Tuno, Pinamudlan, Napantao, Habay, Sudmon, and Santa Paz. Through the years, these barrios were subdivided to create new barangays, taking the total number of barangays to the current 22.

In December 2003, a landslide destroyed most of barangay Punta, killing 200 people.

== Geography ==
The town's coastal waters are part of the Panaon Island Protected Seascape.

=== Barangays ===
San Francisco is politically subdivided into 22 barangays. Each barangay consists of puroks and some have sitios.

- Anislagon
- Bongbong
- Central (Poblacion)
- Dakit (Poblacion)
- Habay
- Marayag
- Napantao
- Pinamudlan
- Santa Paz Norte
- Santa Paz Sur
- Sudmon
- Tinaan
- Tuno
- Ubos (Poblacion)
- Bongawisan
- Cuasi
- Gabi
- Cahayag
- Malico
- Pasanon
- Punta
- Santa Cruz

=== Climate ===
Climate data for San Francisco, Southern Leyte
Month	Jan	Feb	Mar	Apr	May	Jun	Jul	Aug	Sep	Oct	Nov	Dec	Year
Mean daily maximum °C (°F)	28 (82)	28 (82)	29 (84)	31 (88)	31 (88)	31 (88)	30 (86)	30 (86)	30 (86)	29 (84)	29 (84)	28 (82)	30 (85)
Mean daily minimum °C (°F)	23 (73)	23 (73)	23 (73)	24 (75)	24 (75)	25 (77)	24 (75)	24 (75)	24 (75)	24 (75)	24 (75)	23 (73)	24 (75)
Average precipitation mm (inches)	98 (3.9)	82 (3.2)	96 (3.8)	71 (2.8)	104 (4.1)	129 (5.1)	101 (4.0)	94 (3.7)	99 (3.9)	135 (5.3)	174 (6.9)	143 (5.6)	1,326 (52.3)
Average rainy days	18.0	14.1	17.1	16.8	23.7	25.7	25.8	23.3	24.4	25.9	24.0	20.6	259.4
Source: Meteoblue

== Demographics ==
Population census of San Francisco
Year	Pop.	±% p.a.
1960	8,613	—
1970	8,928	+0.36%
1975	9,456	+1.16%
1980	9,995	+1.11%
1990	10,438	+0.43%
1995	9,543	−1.67%
2000	10,869	+2.83%
2007	12,084	+1.47%
2010	12,528	+1.32%
2015	13,402	+1.29%
2020	13,436	+0.05%
2024	12,897	−0.98%
Source: Philippine Statistics Authority

== Economy ==
Poverty incidence of San Francisco (%)

Source: Philippine Statistics Authority
