= Bontoc, Southern Leyte =

Municipality in Southern Leyte, Philippines

Bontoc
- Municipality
- Municipality of Bontoc
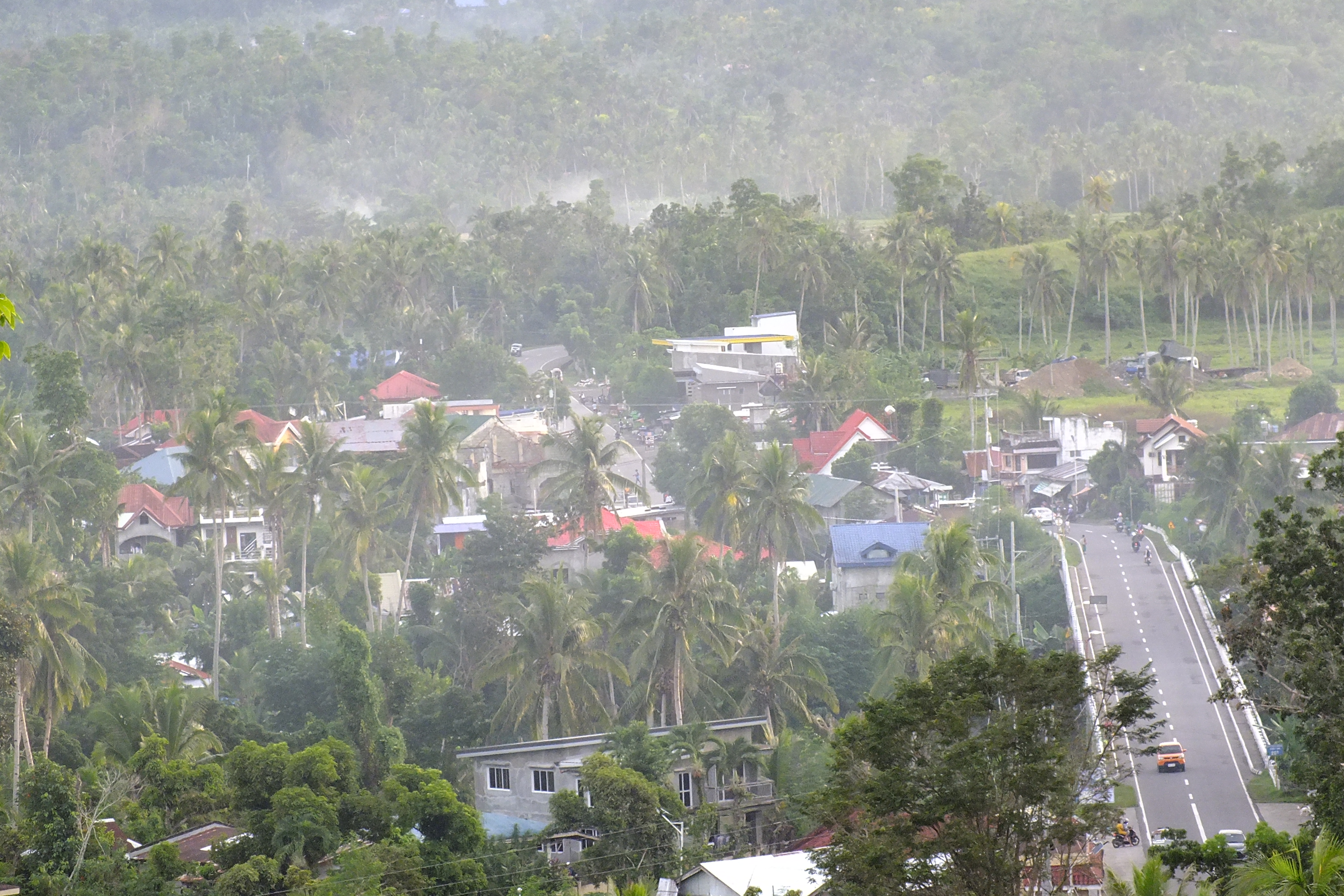
- Bontoc in 2022

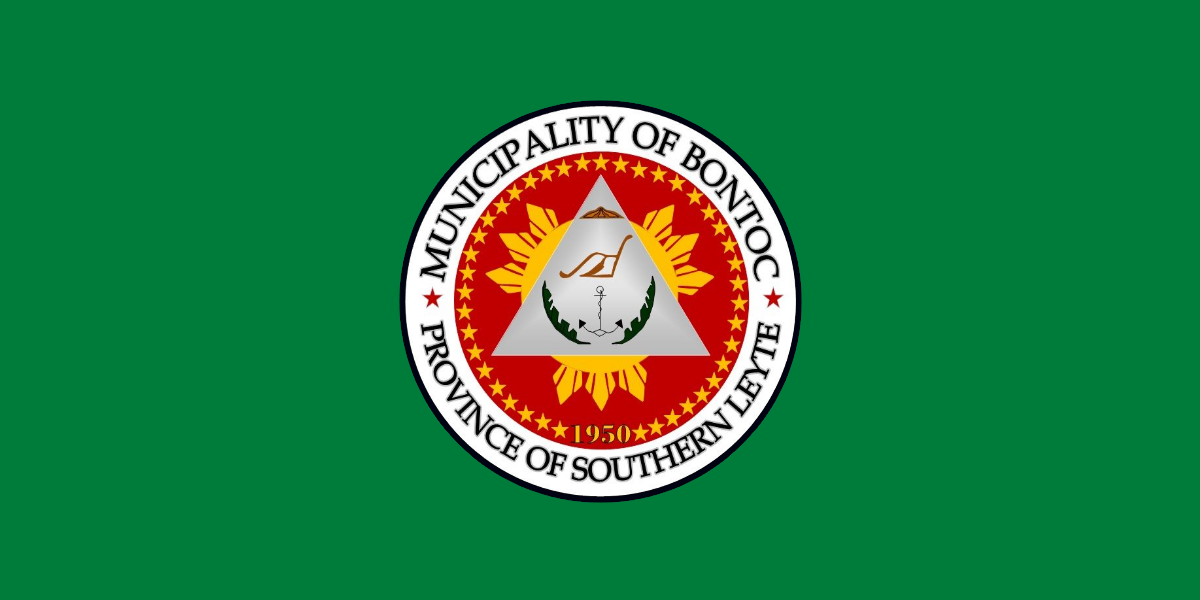
- Flag Seal

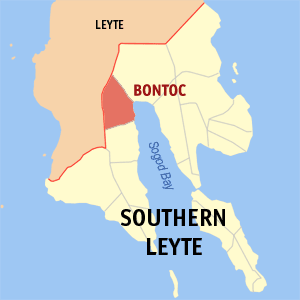
- Map of Southern Leyte with Bontoc highlighted
- Interactive map of Bontoc
- Location within the Philippines
- Coordinates: 10°21′N 124°58′E
- Country: Philippines
- Region: Eastern Visayas
- Province: Southern Leyte
- District: 1st district
- Founded: June 15, 1950
- Barangays: 40 (see Barangays)

Government
  - Type: Sangguniang Bayan
  - Mayor: Noel E. Alinsub (Aksyon)
  - Vice Mayor: Rodulfo V. Nablea (Aksyon)
  - Representative: Luz V. Mercado
  - Municipal Council: Members: Marissa T. Dayagbil; James A. Olayvar; Romualdo A. Dizon Jr.; Florencia M. Carbonilla; Joel T. Guasa; Teody R. Lampong; Rodrigo C. Tomaub; Merlyn L. Faelnar
  - Electorate: 21,823 voters (2025)

Area
  - Total: 102.10 km^{2} (39.42 sq mi)
- Elevation: 47 m (154 ft)
- Highest elevation: 390 m (1,280 ft)
- Lowest elevation: 0 m (0 ft)

Population (2024 census)
  - Total: 32,082
  - Density: 314.22/km^{2} (813.83/sq mi)
  - Households: 7,283

Economy
  - Income class: 3rd municipal income class
  - Poverty incidence: 19.15% (2023)
  - Revenue: ₱ 16.2 million (2024)
  - Assets: ₱ 458.6 million (2024)
  - Expenditure: ₱ 164.2 million (2024)
  - Liabilities: ₱ 106.1 million (2024)

Service provider
  - Electricity: Southern Leyte Electric Cooperative (SOLECO)
- Time zone: UTC+8 (PST)
- ZIP code: 6604
- PSGC: 0806402000
- IDD : area code: +63 (0)53
- Native languages: Boholano dialect Cebuano; Tagalog

Bontoc, officially the Municipality of Bontoc (Cebuano: Lungsod sa Bontoc; Tagalog: Bayan ng Bontoc), is a municipality in the province of Southern Leyte, Philippines. According to the 2024 census, it has a population of 32,082 people.

The town is home to the Bontoc Campus of the Southern Leyte State University, which offers agricultural and industrial courses.

The town celebrates their fiesta in honor of the Holy Child Jesus. The Ulang Festival, held annually on January 15, is celebrated by colorful participants dancing in honor of the icon of the Señor Santo Niño (Holy Child Jesus). Some devotees to the Señor Santo Niño said that it can performed miracles that can heal sickness of those who touches the said icon.

== Etymology ==
The name “Bontoc” is derived from an old creek called Bontoc creek near the present Roman Catholic Cemetery where old “pueblo” called Daan Lungsod existed during the early Spanish regime.

== History ==
Before the coming of the Spaniards, Bontoc was a wilderness where few natives lived and wild animals roamed. When the Spaniards came, they found scattered warring tribes of primitive Malays who settled in prosperous villages near the mouth and along the fertile plains of the historic Salog river basin. They then successfully subjugated these warring tribes and immigrants and founded a cluster of villages which later on formed the nucleus of the Barrio of Bontoc.

As far as history could recall the most popular among the ancient warring chiefs, was Mariano Barcelon who was nicknamed as "Tahug". He was acclaimed to be the bravest of the braves. His name was a terror to the Moro pirates that swarmed Philippine waters during the 16th century.

During the Spanish time up to the early part of the American regime, Bontoc was ruled by a succession of native "Cabezas de barangay", a unit government organization during that time. Bontoc was at that time a tributary "pueblo" belonging to the old town of Libagon which governed the people for many years both in civil and religious matter by a line of "capitanes" or gobernadorcillos.

The cabezas de barangay who governed this little pueblo also earned for themselves the honor of being called "capitan" by their own people. The church wielded tremendous power at that time in the affairs of the government. Any person who offends the clergy or disobeys religious order is severely punished.

Among the well-known capitanes who controlled the reins of the local administration of this barrio were among them: Hilario Barcelon, Manuel Leyes, Romualdo Tubia, Florentino Flores, Felipe Aguilar and the last well-known cabeza or capitan was Gerardo Faelnar popularly known by the people as Capitan Dadoy whose administration lasted up to the early days of American occupation.

Shortly after the coming of the Americans, Bontoc became a unit barrio of Sogod.

During the Japanese occupation, the town served as the seat of resistance movement against the Japanese with its general headquarters in Sitio Mamingaw, Barangay Banahaw and under the command of Colonel Ruperto K. Kangleon. In one notable raid, an entire truckload of Japanese soldiers on patrol was completely annihilated at Sitio Trece, Barangay Santo Niño. A small monument stands in front of Bontoc motor pool at Sitio Trece commemorates this event.

On June 15, 1950, it became a regular municipality by the operative provisions of Republic Act No. 522.

== Geography ==
The town is situated on a long stretch of rich alluvial plain, which considered as the greatest farming region in the entire Sogod Bay District, and is drained by the Salog and Divisoria Rivers. Because of its rich soil, there is much rice farming. The town is also the producer of abaca, copra and tobacco in the Bay District.

=== Barangays ===
Bontoc is politically subdivided into 40 barangays. Each barangay consists of puroks and some have sitios.

- Anahao
- Banahao
- Baugo
- Beniton
- Buenavista
- Bunga
- Casao
- Catmon
- Catoogan
- Cawayanan
- Dao
- Divisoria
- Esperanza
- Guinsangaan
- Hibagwan
- Hilaan
- Himakilo
- Hitawos
- Lanao
- Lawgawan
- Mahayahay
- Malbago
- Mauylab
- Olisihan
- Paku
- Pamahawan
- Pamigsian
- Pangi
- Poblacion
- Pong-on
- Sampongon
- San Ramon
- San Vicente
- Santa Cruz
- Santo Niño
- Taa
- Talisay
- Taytagan
- Tuburan
- Union

=== Climate ===
Climate data for Bontoc, Southern Leyte
Month	Jan	Feb	Mar	Apr	May	Jun	Jul	Aug	Sep	Oct	Nov	Dec	Year
Mean daily maximum °C (°F)	28 (82)	29 (84)	29 (84)	30 (86)	30 (86)	30 (86)	29 (84)	29 (84)	29 (84)	29 (84)	29 (84)	29 (84)	29 (84)
Mean daily minimum °C (°F)	22 (72)	22 (72)	23 (73)	24 (75)	25 (77)	25 (77)	25 (77)	25 (77)	25 (77)	25 (77)	24 (75)	23 (73)	24 (75)
Average precipitation mm (inches)	78 (3.1)	57 (2.2)	84 (3.3)	79 (3.1)	118 (4.6)	181 (7.1)	178 (7.0)	169 (6.7)	172 (6.8)	180 (7.1)	174 (6.9)	128 (5.0)	1,598 (62.9)
Average rainy days	16.7	13.8	17.3	18.5	23.2	26.5	27.1	26.0	26.4	27.5	24.6	21.0	268.6
Source: Meteoblue

== Demographics ==
Population census of Bontoc

Year	Pop.	±% p.a.
1960	15,835	—
1970	17,325	+0.90%
1975	20,452	+3.38%
1980	22,655	+2.07%
1990	24,818	+0.92%
1995	24,047	−0.59%

Year	Pop.	±% p.a.
2000	27,592	+2.99%
2007	28,535	+0.46%
2010	28,079	−0.58%
2015	28,905	+0.55%
2020	29,799	+0.64%
2024	32,082	+1.79%

Source: Philippine Statistics Authority

== Economy ==
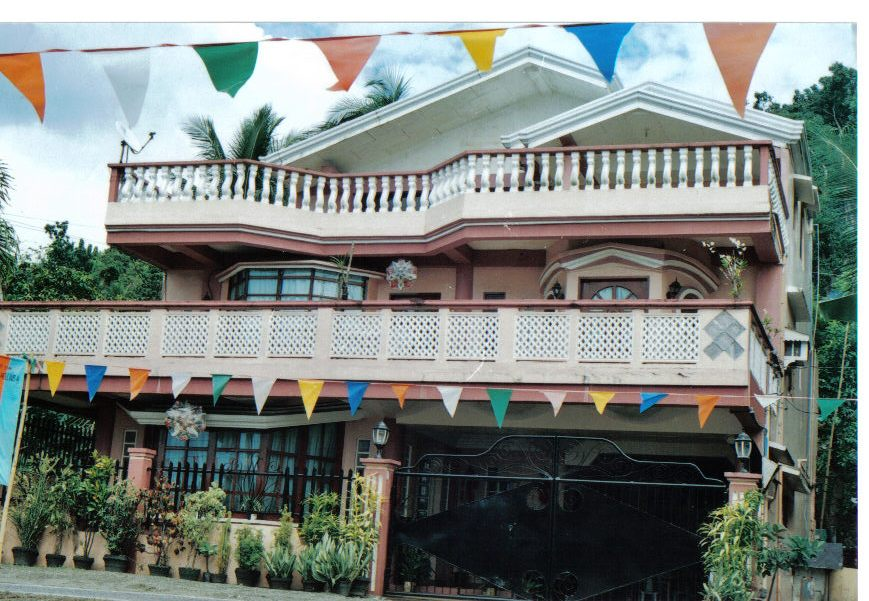
Ancestral house in Barangay Paku

Poverty incidence of Bontoc (%)

Source: Philippine Statistics Authority
