= Tomas Oppus =

Municipality in Southern Leyte, Philippines

Tomas Oppus Banday
- Municipality
- Municipality of Tomas Oppus
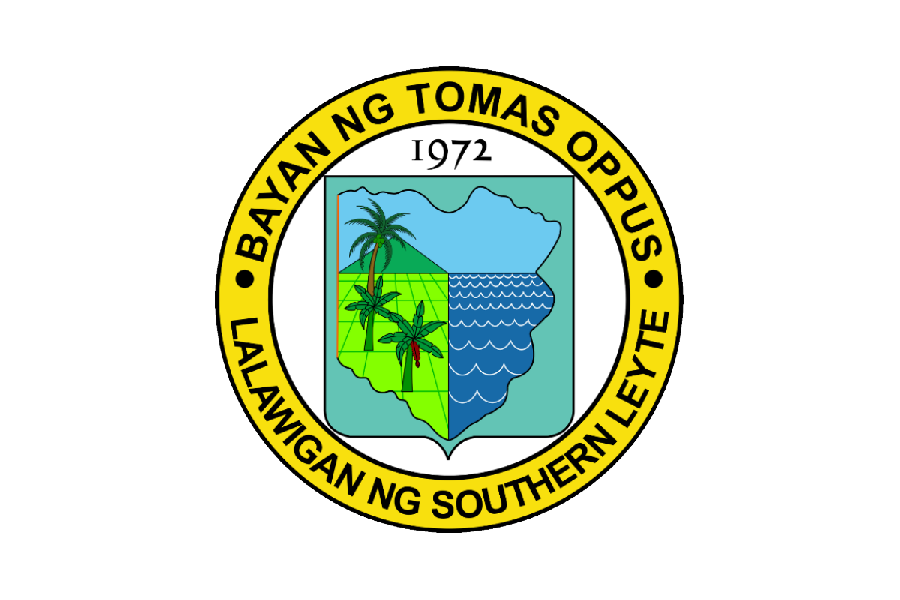
- Flag Seal

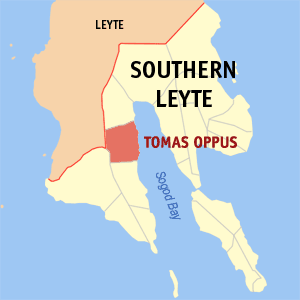
- Map of Southern Leyte with Tomas Oppus highlighted
- Interactive map of Tomas Oppus
- Location within the Philippines
- Coordinates: 10°15′N 124°59′E
- Country: Philippines
- Region: Eastern Visayas
- Province: Southern Leyte
- District: 1st district
- Named for: Don Tomás Oppus y Garcés
- Barangays: 29 (see Barangays)

Government
  - Type: Sangguniang Bayan
  - Mayor: Jessica Marie Escaño-Pano (Lakas)
  - Vice Mayor: Nicanor F. Tahup (PDPLBN)
  - Representative: Luz V. Mercado
  - Municipal Council: Members: Lodivico C. Mosot; Genaro R. Barcelon; Alex M. Octobre; Agustin R. Escaño Jr.; Alejandro S. Aves; Ildefonso C. Callano; Freddie K. Caday; Ruel K. Pacaldo
  - Electorate: 11,800 voters (2025)

Area
  - Total: 56.11 km^{2} (21.66 sq mi)
- Elevation: 79 m (259 ft)
- Highest elevation: 510 m (1,670 ft)
- Lowest elevation: 0 m (0 ft)

Population (2024 census)
  - Total: 16,846
  - Density: 300.2/km^{2} (777.6/sq mi)
  - Households: 4,050

Economy
  - Income class: 4th municipal income class
  - Poverty incidence: 19.12% (2023)
  - Revenue: ₱ 45.28 million (2024)
  - Assets: ₱ 338.5 million (2024)
  - Expenditure: ₱ 148.3 million (2024)
  - Liabilities: ₱ 106.6 million (2024)

Service provider
  - Electricity: Southern Leyte Electric Cooperative (SOLECO)
- Time zone: UTC+8 (PST)
- ZIP code: 6605
- PSGC: 0806418000
- IDD : area code: +63 (0)53
- Native languages: Boholano dialect Cebuano; Tagalog

Tomas Oppus, officially the Municipality of Tomas Oppus (Cebuano: Lungsod sa Tomas Oppus; Tagalog: Bayan ng Tomas Oppus), is a municipality in the province of Southern Leyte, Philippines. According to the 2024 census, it has a population of 16,846 people.

== Geography ==
=== Barangays ===
Tomas Oppus is politically subdivided into 29 barangays. Each barangay consists of puroks and some have sitios.

- Anahawan
- Banday (Poblacion)
- Biasong
- Bogo (Poblacion)
- Cabascan
- Camansi
- Cambite
- Canlupao
- Carnaga
- Cawayan
- Higosoan
- Hinagtikan
- Hinapo
- Hugpa
- Iniguihan
- Looc
- Luan
- Maanyag
- Mag-ata
- Mapgap
- Maslog
- Punong
- Rizal
- San Agustin (Lotaw)
- San Antonio (Calayugan)
- San Isidro
- San Miguel
- San Roque
- Tinago

=== Climate ===
Climate data for Tomas Oppus, Southern Leyte
Month	Jan	Feb	Mar	Apr	May	Jun	Jul	Aug	Sep	Oct	Nov	Dec	Year
Mean daily maximum °C (°F)	28 (82)	28 (82)	29 (84)	31 (88)	31 (88)	30 (86)	30 (86)	30 (86)	30 (86)	29 (84)	29 (84)	28 (82)	29 (85)
Mean daily minimum °C (°F)	23 (73)	23 (73)	23 (73)	24 (75)	24 (75)	24 (75)	24 (75)	24 (75)	24 (75)	24 (75)	24 (75)	23 (73)	24 (74)
Average precipitation mm (inches)	98 (3.9)	82 (3.2)	96 (3.8)	71 (2.8)	104 (4.1)	129 (5.1)	101 (4.0)	94 (3.7)	99 (3.9)	135 (5.3)	174 (6.9)	143 (5.6)	1,326 (52.3)
Average rainy days	18.0	14.1	17.1	16.8	23.7	25.7	25.8	23.3	24.4	25.9	24.0	20.6	259.4
Source: Meteoblue

== Demographics ==
Population census of Tomas Oppus
Year	Pop.	±% p.a.
1970	10,335	—
1975	11,790	+2.68%
1980	12,480	+1.14%
1990	13,192	+0.56%
1995	12,609	−0.84%
2000	14,930	+3.69%
2007	15,817	+0.80%
2010	15,807	−0.02%
2015	16,608	+0.95%
2020	16,990	+0.48%
2024	16,846	−0.20%
Source: Philippine Statistics Authority

== Economy ==
Poverty incidence of Tomas Oppus (%)

Source: Philippine Statistics Authority
