= Southern Leyte Provincial Board =

Legislative body of the province of Southern Leyte, Philippines

Southern Leyte Provincial Board: Sangguniang Panlalawigan sa Habagatang Leyte (Cebuano); Sangguniang Panlalawigan ng Katimugang Leyte (Filipino)
- 9th Southern Leyte Provincial Board

Type
- Type: Unicameral
- Term limits: 3 terms (9 years)

Leadership
- Presiding Officer: Rosa Emilia G. Mercado, Lakas-CMD

Structure
- Seats: 11 board members 1 ex officio presiding officer
- Political groups: Lakas-CMD (5) Reporma (1) Tingog (1) Independent (1) Nonpartisan (3)
- Committees: Multiple non-transferable vote (regular members); Indirect election (ex officio members)
- Length of term: 3 years
- Authority: Local Government Code of the Philippines

Elections
- Last election: May 12, 2025
- Next election: May 15, 2028

Meeting place
- Session Hall, Legislative Building; Southern Leyte Provincial Capitol; Maasin City, Southern Leyte, Philippines

Website
- Southern Leyte Provincial Board Official Website

The Southern Leyte Provincial Board (Cebuano: Sangguniang Panlalawigan sa Habagatang Leyte) is the Sangguniang Panlalawigan (provincial legislature) of the Philippine province of Southern Leyte.

The members are elected via plurality-at-large voting: the province is divided into two legislative districts, each sending four members to the provincial board; the electorate votes for four members, with the four candidates with the highest number of votes being elected. The vice governor is the ex officio presiding officer, and only votes to break ties. The vice governor is also elected via the plurality voting system province-wide.

== District apportionment ==
Election Year	No. of seats per district		Ex officio seats	Total seats
Election Year	1st	2nd	Ex officio seats	Total seats
2004–2010	4	4	3	11
2013–2016	4	4	2	10

== Current members ==
=== Vice Governor ===
- Rosa Emilia G. Mercado, Lakas-CMD - Presiding Officer

=== District Board Members ===
District	Name	Party	Term	Notes
1st	Jonathan Lee P. Maraon	Lakas-CMD	3	
1st	Alan Jose K. Aroy	Lakas-CMD	1	
1st	Teopisto C. Rojas Jr.	Lakas-CMD	2	
1st	Rolito D. Manalo	Reporma	1	
2nd	Napoleon P. Regis	Lakas-CMD	3	
2nd	Rolando Q. Bacoy	Lakas-CMD	2	
2nd	Roque Damian A. Dator	Independent	1	
2nd	Jason C. Calva	Tingog	1	

=== Ex officio Board Members ===
Name	Provincial Federation
Ronel Gabriel	League of Barangays of the Philippines
Mario Oliver B. Ranque (Interim)	Philippine Councilors' League

== List of members ==
An additional three ex officio members are the presidents of the provincial chapters of the Association of Barangay Captains, the Councilors' League, the Sangguniang Kabataan provincial president; the municipal and city (if applicable) presidents of the Association of Barangay Captains, Councilors' League and Sangguniang Kabataan, shall elect amongst themselves their provincial presidents which shall be their representatives at the board.

However, with the recent controversy regarding the role of the Sangguniang Kabataan and the proposed amendments to the Local Government Code, specifically the Sangguniang Kabataan provisions, the Sangguniang Kabataan provincial chapter president does not currently serve as an ex officio member of the Provincial Board.

=== Vice Governor ===
Election year	Name	Party
1998	Eva Tomol	NPC
2001	Eva Tomol	NPC
2004	Miguel Maamo II	NPC
2007	Miguel Maamo II	Lakas
2010	Miguel Maamo II	Lakas–Kampi
2013	Sheffered Lino Tan	Liberal
2016	Christopherson Yap	Liberal
2019	Christopherson Yap	PDP–Laban
2022	Rosa Emilia G. Mercado	PDP–Laban
2025	Rosa Emilia G. Mercado	Lakas

=== 1st District ===
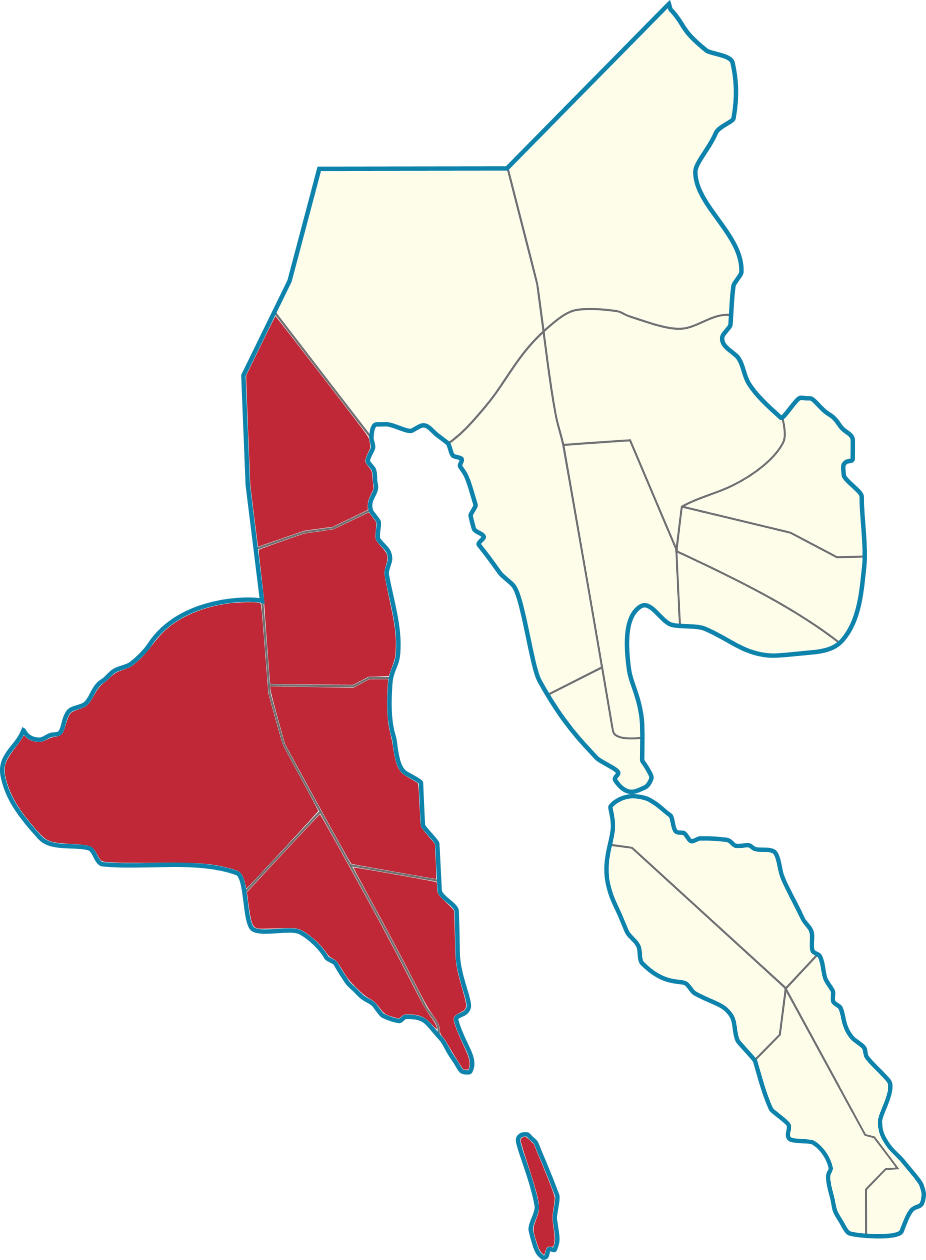
Map of the First Sangguninang Panlalawigan District of Southern Leyte

- City: Maasin
- Municipalities: Bontoc, Limasawa, Macrohon, Malitbog, Padre Burgos, Tomas Oppus
- Population (2015): 197,392

Election year	Member (party)	Member (party)	Member (party)	Member (party)
2004	Eva Tomol (NPC)	Agustin Escaño, Jr. (Lakas–CMD)	Arturo Bascug (NPC)	Cesar Rey (NPC)
2007	Albert Esclamado (Lakas–CMD)	Agustin Escaño, Jr. (KAMPI)	Cesar Rey (Lakas–CMD)	Teopisto Rojas, Jr. (Lakas–CMD)
2010	Albert Esclamado (Lakas-Kampi)	Cesar Rey (Lakas-Kampi)	Felicula Escaño (Lakas-Kampi)	Teopisto Rojas, Jr. (Lakas-Kampi)
2013	Albert Esclamado (NUP)	Alan Jose Aroy (NUP)	Felicula Escaño^{1} (NUP)	Teopisto Rojas, Jr. (NUP)
2013	Albert Esclamado (NUP)	Alan Jose Aroy (NUP)	Jessica Marie Escaño-Pano^{2} (NUP)	Teopisto Rojas, Jr. (NUP)
2016	Jessica Marie Escaño-Pano (Liberal)	Fe Edillo (Liberal)	Margarita Bantug (Liberal)	Adriano Idjao (Liberal)
2019	Fe G. Edillo (PDP-Laban)	Crispin Arong Jr. (PDP-Laban)	Teopisto C. Rojas Jr. (PDP-Laban)	Pedro V. Fustanes Jr. (PDP-Laban)
2022	Fe G. Edillo (PDP-Laban)	Jonathan Lee P. Maraon (PDP-Laban)	Teopisto C. Rojas Jr. (PDP-Laban)	Pedro V. Fustanes Jr. (PDP-Laban)
2025	Jonathan Lee P. Maraon (Lakas-CMD)	Alan Jose K. Aroy (Lakas-CMD)	Teopisto C. Rojas Jr. (Lakas-CMD)	Rolito D. Manalo (Reporma)

^1 Died in office, July 21, 2014.
^2 Replaced her to fill vacancy; appointed on 11 March, 2015, took oath of office on 30 March, 2015.

=== 2nd District ===
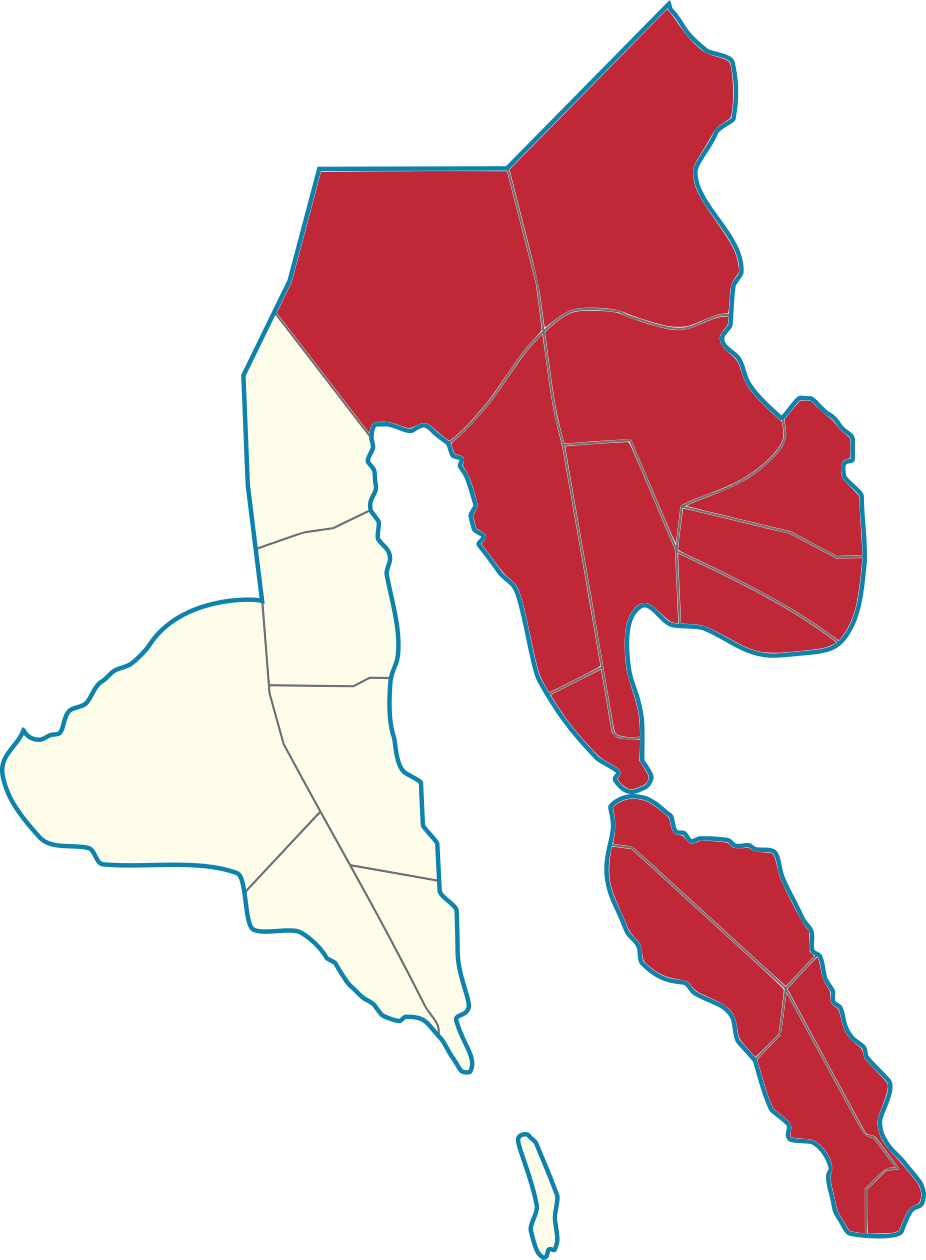
Map of the Second Sangguninang Panlalawigan District of Southern Leyte

- City: none
- Municipalities: Anahawan, Hinunangan, Hinundayan, Libagon, Liloan, Pintuyan, Saint Bernard, San Francisco, San Juan, San Ricardo, Silago, Sogod
- Population (2015): 224,358

Election year	Member (party)	Member (party)	Member (party)	Member (party)
2004	Jason Calva (NPC)	Orlando Tan (Lakas–CMD)	Florentino Fernandez, Jr. (PMP)	Amalia Yap (PMP)
2007	Jason Calva (Lakas–CMD)	Roberto Lagumbay (Lakas–CMD)	Daisy Gamale (NPC)	Florentino Fernandez, Jr. (Lakas–CMD)
2010	Roberto Lagumbay (Lakas-Kampi)	Daisy Gamale (Lakas-Kampi)	Florentino Fernandez, Jr. (Lakas-Kampi)	Abelardo Almario (Lakas-Kampi)
2013	Daisy Gamale (NUP)	Miguel Maamo II (NUP)	Abelardo Almario (NUP)	Aileen Estrera (NUP)
2016	Abelardo Almario (Liberal)	Leoncio Uy III (Liberal)	Aileen Estrera (Liberal)	Myra Rentuza (UNA)
2019	Aileen L. Esrera (PDP-Laban)	Napoleon P. Regis (PDP-Laban)	Rolando Q. Bacoy (PDP-Laban)	Myra C. Rentuza (Lakas-CMD)
2022	Napoleon P. Regis (PDP-Laban)	Myra C. Rentuza (PDP-Laban)	Rolando Q. Bacoy (PDP-Laban)	Virgilio A. Mortera (PDP-Laban)
2025	Napoleon P. Regis (Lakas-CMD)	Rolando Q. Bacoy (Lakas-CMD)	Roque Damian A. Dator (Independent)	Jason C. Calva (Tingog)

=== Ex officio members ===
==== Philippine Councilors' League Provincial Federation ====
Election year	Name
2007	Florentino Lubang
2010	Sarah Dampog
2013	Alex Lim
2016	Alex Lim

==== League of Barangays of the Philippines Provincial Federation ====
Election year	Name
2007	Nacional Mercado
2010	Nacional Mercado
2013	Nacional Mercado
2013	Ronel Gabriel^{1}

^1 Replaced Mercado as LnBP Provincial President when Mercado was elected Mayor of Maasin, Southern Leyte in 2016.

==== Sangguniang Kabataan Provincial Federation ====
Election year	Name
2007	Joyce Mejia
2010	Janine Petracorta

== See also ==
- Southern Leyte
- Legislative district of Southern Leyte
