= Panaon Island =

Island in the Philippines

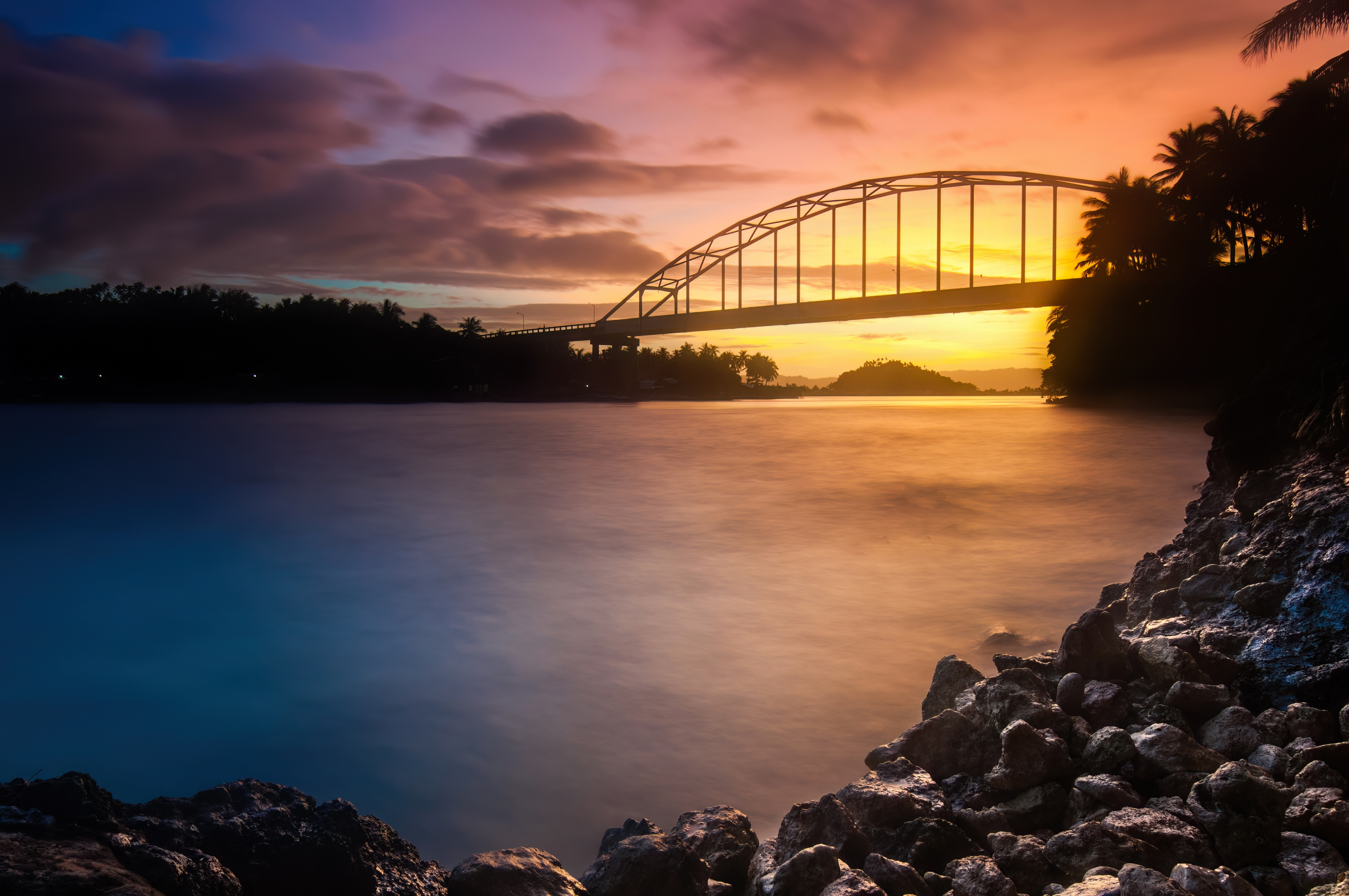
- Wawa Bridge connecting Panaon and Leyte island

- Location within Philippines

Geography
- Coordinates: 10°3′5″N 125°12′45″E
- Adjacent to: Bohol Sea; Sogod Bay; Surigao Strait
- Area: 191 km^{2} (74 sq mi)
- Highest elevation: 2,290 ft (698 m)
- Highest point: Mount Nelangcapan

Administration
- Philippines
- Region: Eastern Visayas
- Province: Southern Leyte
- Municipalities: Liloan; Pintuyan; San Francisco; San Ricardo

Demographics
- Population: 57,703 (as of 2015)

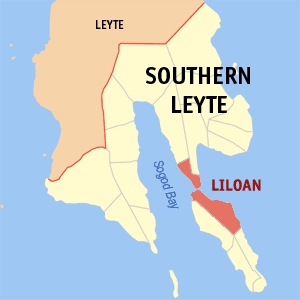
Map of Southern Leyte with Panaon Island on the right bottom corner

Panaon Island is a small island in the Philippines, in the province of Southern Leyte. It lies south of Leyte, separated from Dinagat to the east, and Mindanao to the southeast by Surigao Strait. The Mindanao Sea lies to the southwest.

Panaon is about 30 kilometres (19 mi) long from north to south. The largest town is Liloan, which is connected by a bridge called the Wawa Bridge to the main Leyte Island.

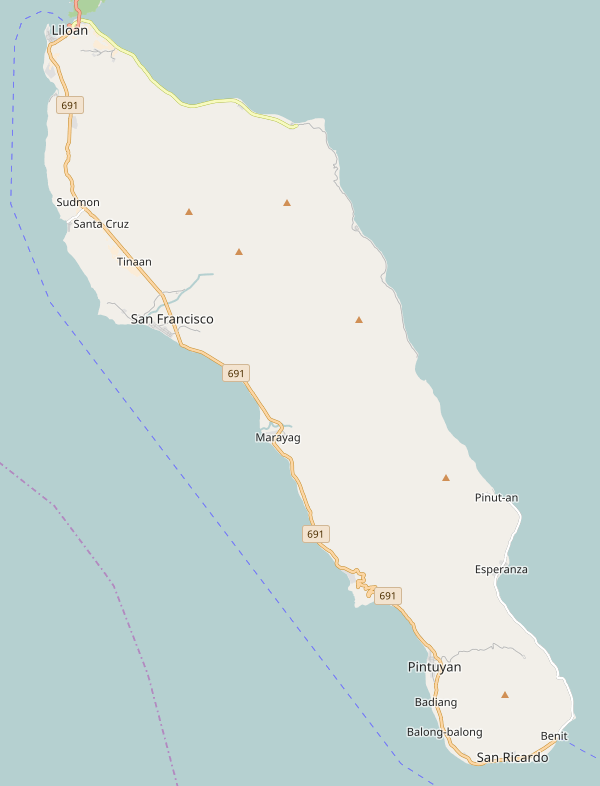

Panaon Island is composed of the municipalities of Liloan, San Francisco, Pintuyan and San Ricardo. The basic forms of living are harvesting coconut, rice, fish and edible green leaves.

Scuba diving and whale watching (referred to locally as Tikitiki) are popular tourist activities.

In 2025, the waters surrounding the island were designated as a protected area known as the Panaon Island Protected Seascape following the signing of Republic Act No. 12238 by President Bongbong Marcos.
