= Sogod Bay =

Bay in Southern Leyte, Philippines

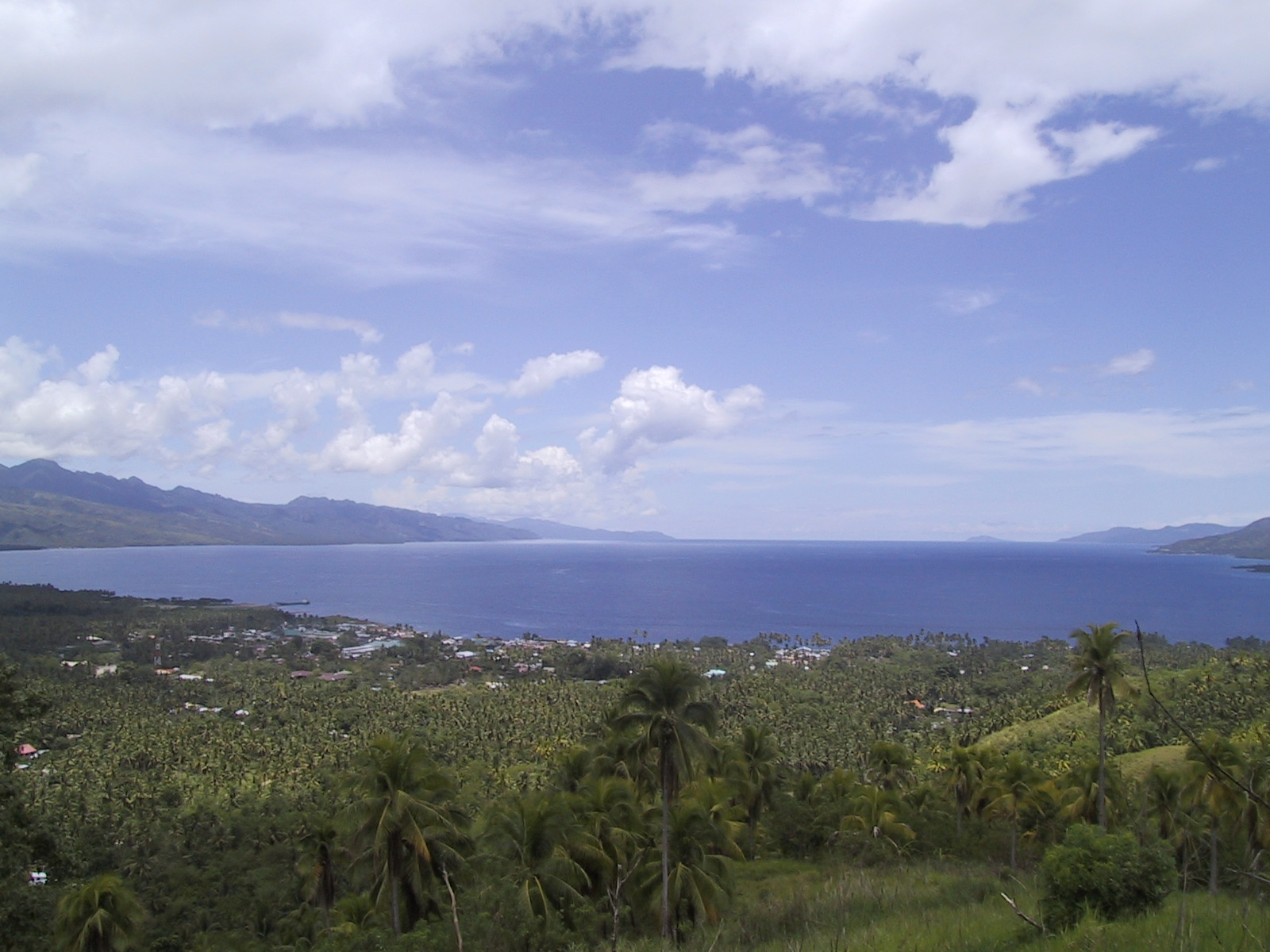
- View of the bay and the town of Sogod

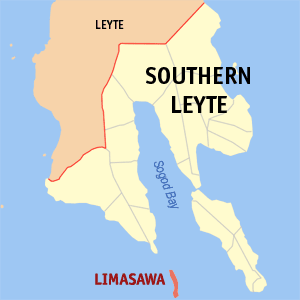

- Location within Philippines
- Location: Southern Leyte, Eastern Visayas, Philippines
- Coordinates: 10°10′N 125°03′E
- Type: Bay
- Max. length: 45 km (28 mi)
- Max. width: 10 km (6.2 mi)
- Settlements: Bontoc; Libagon; Liloan; Limasawa; Malitbog; Padre Burgos; Pintuyan; San Francisco; Sogod; Tomas Oppus

Sogod Bay is a large bay in the southern part of Leyte Island in the Philippines. An extension of the Bohol Sea, the bay is surrounded by the province of Southern Leyte, and the namesake municipality of Sogod is located at the head of the bay. Panaon Island forms part of the eastern side of Sogod Bay, while Sarangani or Limasawa Island is at the mouth of the bay.

== Ecology ==
The bay is home to a variety of fishes, is therefore a major fishing ground for the nine municipalities surrounding the bay. Mangko (Euthynnus affinis) is its major fishery resource. Seasonal influx of Mangko has provided food and livelihood to the people of Sogod and nearby municipalities. A study of Sogod Bay by Silliman University in 1994 mentioned that there are seven finfish species that are pelagic and are harvested when they enter the bay. Recently, there have been reports of whale shark sightings in the bay.

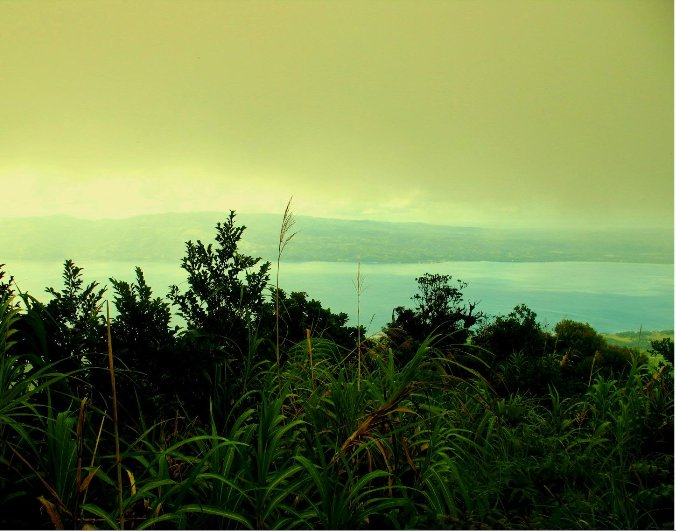
The bay as seen from Mount Patag Daku in Libagon

The Subangdaku River is a major tributary of Sogod Bay, emptying into the bay at the municipality of Sogod. Human activity within the rivers watershed, such as quarrying and rechanneling, has disturbed the river and bay's ecology, and is also causing rapid siltation. These activities were mentioned in the Silliman University study that identified sand and gravel mining, rechanneling, and sand harvest near the river's mouth, as causes of degraded habitats and major water quality issues of the area. The same report mentioned mining as one of the harmful practices that the bay should be protected from, and it recommended regulating quarrying and rechanneling with competent planning based on scientific evidence and monitoring.
