= Subangdaku =

Subangdaku, which means "wide river" in Cebuano, may refer to the following places in the Philippines:

- Subangdaku River, a river in the province of Southern Leyte
- Subangdaku, a barangay in the city of Mandaue
