= Silago =

Municipality in Southern Leyte, Philippines

- Municipality
- Municipality of Silago
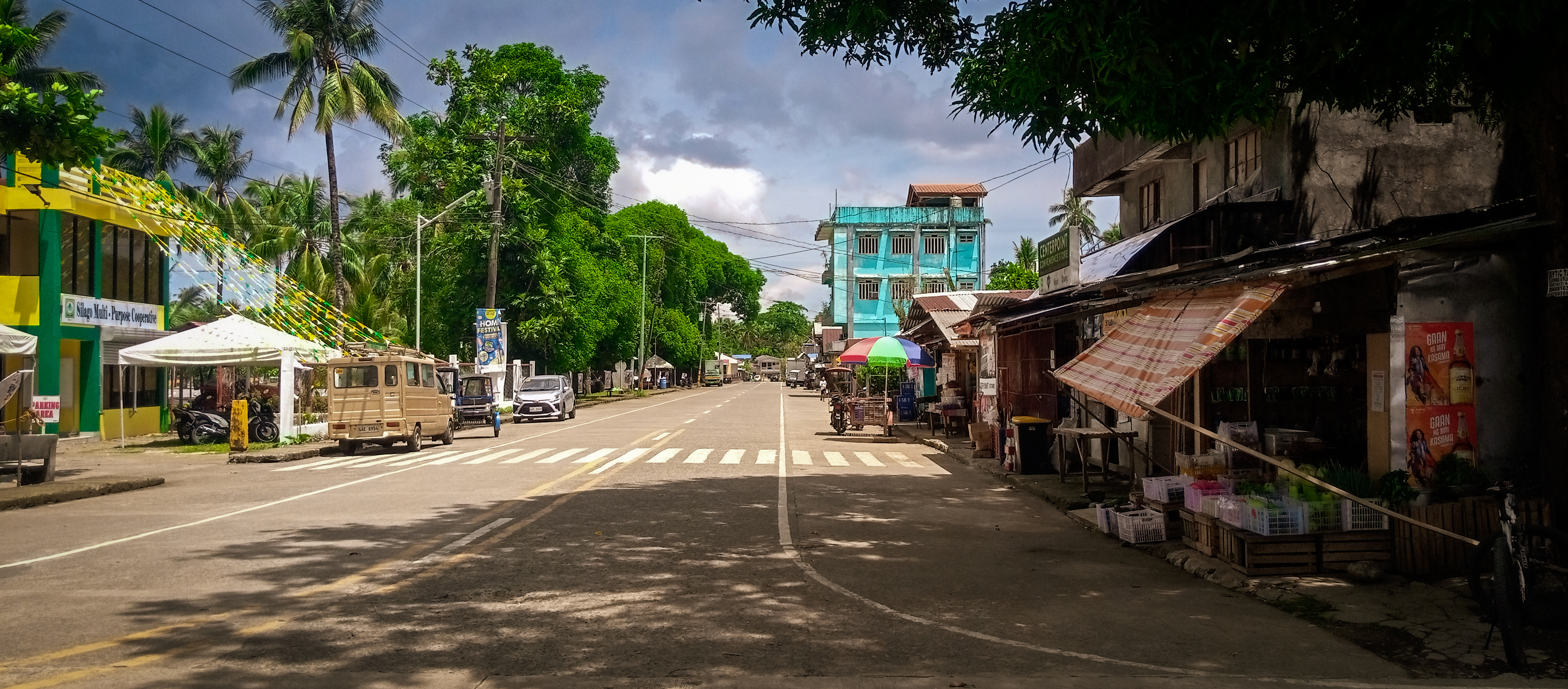
- View of Silago

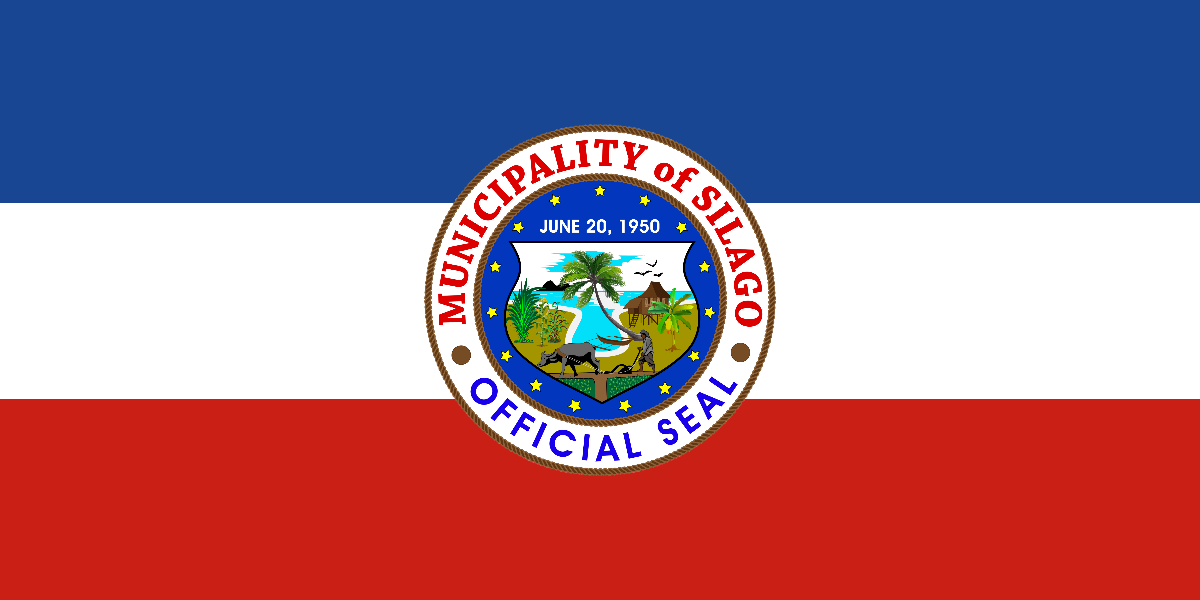
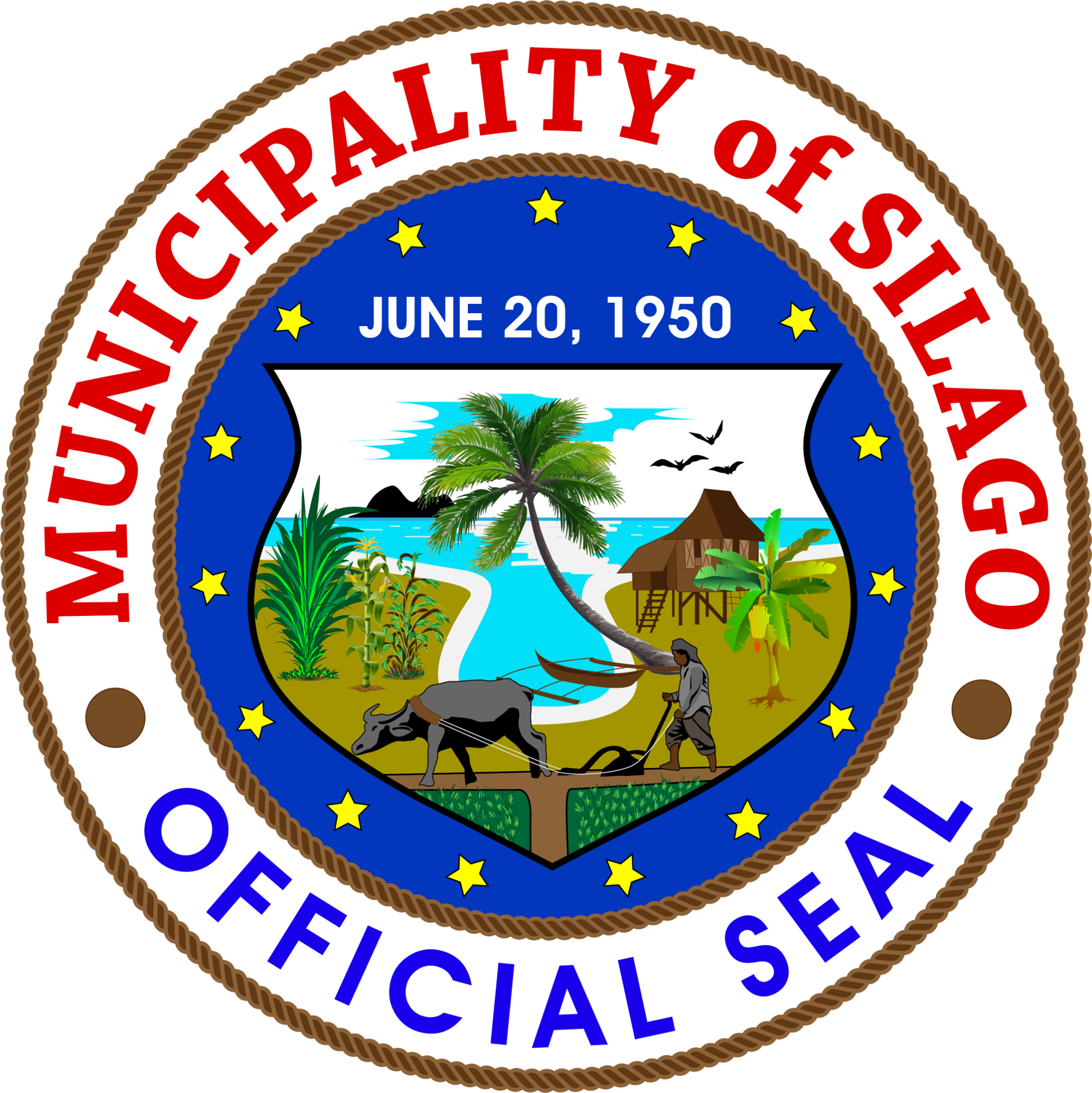
- Flag Seal
- Anthem: Silago Hymn
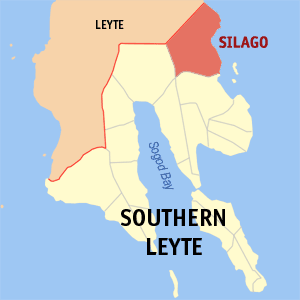
- Map of Southern Leyte with Silago highlighted
- Interactive map of Silago
- Location within the Philippines
- Coordinates: 10°31′45″N 125°09′42″E
- Country: Philippines
- Region: Eastern Visayas
- Province: Southern Leyte
- District: 2nd district
- Founded: June 20, 1950
- Barangays: 15 (see Barangays)

Government
  - Type: Sangguniang Bayan
  - Mayor: Lemuel P. Honor (PROMDI)
  - Vice Mayor: Sandielito A. Ando (PROMDI)
  - Representative: Christopherson M. Yap
  - Municipal Council: Members: Eduardo M. Gomez; Artemio B. Montaña; George S. Kuizon Jr.; Manuel M. Labrador Jr.; Arsenio T. Engcoy Jr.; Lerma D. Dollente; Eldie H. Hinampas; Ramon I. Lucero
  - Electorate: 10,957 voters (2025)

Area
  - Total: 215.05 km^{2} (83.03 sq mi)
- Elevation: 150 m (490 ft)
- Highest elevation: 909 m (2,982 ft)
- Lowest elevation: 0 m (0 ft)

Population (2024 census)
  - Total: 14,677
  - Density: 68.249/km^{2} (176.76/sq mi)
  - Households: 3,345

Economy
  - Income class: 4th municipal income class
  - Poverty incidence: 14.41% (2023)
  - Revenue: ₱ 6.251 million (2024)
  - Assets: ₱ 379.7 million (2024)
  - Expenditure: ₱ 131.6 million (2024)
  - Liabilities: ₱ 96.72 million (2024)

Service provider
  - Electricity: Southern Leyte Electric Cooperative (SOLECO)
- Time zone: UTC+8 (PST)
- ZIP code: 6606
- PSGC: 0806416000
- IDD : area code: +63 (0)53
- Native languages: Boholano dialect Cebuano; Tagalog

Silago, officially the Municipality of Silago (Cebuano: Lungsod sa Silago; Tagalog: Bayan ng Silago), is a municipality in the province of Southern Leyte, Philippines. According to the 2024 census, it has a population of 14,677 people.

It was used to be barrio of Hinunangan until Executive Order No. 326 dated May 17, 1950 separated it from the mother town. The town has an ebony beach with unique black sand.

== Etymology ==
The name "Silago" was a shortening of Spanish murcielago (bat), referring to an account when the Spaniards encountered bats in the area perching in trees locally known as tuog. The natives replied the incomprehensible question of the name of their place asked by the Spaniards saying "tua'y daghang kabug" in the belief that the Spaniards were amazed the huge number of bats present in the area that time. The place was then called "Murcielago" and over time, was shortened to its present name Silago.

However, accounts from Pigafetta on the Magellan voyage indicates a certain island in Leyte recorded as 'Cenalo' along with the recorded 'Hinnangar' (Hinunangan), and 'Abarien' (Cabalian), which in a new presentation by Greg Hontiveros on the First Mass controversy published in 2008, designated it to the Hingatungan Point in the town and therefore not an island as the account indicates.

== History ==
Silago was once part of the Municipality of Hinunangan, and under its political jurisdiction.

During World War II, Silago was the site of the USS Nautilus (SS-168) dropping off American weapons for Leyte resistance fighters.

After World War II, in 1948, local officials, with the support of then-Secretary of National Defense Ruperto Kangleon took efforts to turn Silago from a barrio into a municipality. On 20 June 1950, the Municipality of Silago was founded through Executive Order No. 326 issued by President Elpidio Quirino. The Executive Order was chartered through Republic Act No. 5962.

The first set of municipal officials were appointed by Quirino on May 17, 1951. Felix Balagon was appointed as Mayor, Leon Fortaliza as Vice Mayor, and Manuel Tomol, Enrique Sarona, Modesto Miras and Manuel Cruzada as councilors. Pedro Tomol was appointed as Municipal Secretary.

== Geography ==
=== Barangays ===
Silago is politically subdivided into 15 barangays. Each barangay consists of puroks and some have sitios.

There are 5 brangays of which are landlocked and the remaining 10 barangays are located at the east coast.

Population Growth per Barangay
Barangays	Population (2015)	Population (2020)	Percent Change
Balagawan	825	850	3.03%
Catmon	179	141	-21.23%
Hingatungan	2,129	2,184	2.58%
Imelda	268	291	8.58%
Katipunan	589	728	23.60%
Laguma	800	795	-0.63%
Mercedes	1,840	1,824	-0.87%
Poblacion District 1	1,339	1,286	-3.96%
Poblacion District 2	1,406	1,439	2.35%
Puntana	356	322	-9.55%
Salvacion	642	652	1.56%
Sap-ang	609	650	6.73%
Sudmon	445	511	14.83%
Tuba-on	437	479	9.61%
Tubod	911	964	5.82%

=== Climate ===
Climate data for Silago, Southern Leyte
Month	Jan	Feb	Mar	Apr	May	Jun	Jul	Aug	Sep	Oct	Nov	Dec	Year
Mean daily maximum °C (°F)	28 (82)	28 (82)	29 (84)	30 (86)	30 (86)	30 (86)	29 (84)	30 (86)	30 (86)	29 (84)	29 (84)	28 (82)	29 (84)
Mean daily minimum °C (°F)	22 (72)	22 (72)	22 (72)	23 (73)	24 (75)	24 (75)	24 (75)	24 (75)	24 (75)	24 (75)	23 (73)	23 (73)	23 (74)
Average precipitation mm (inches)	90 (3.5)	67 (2.6)	82 (3.2)	70 (2.8)	97 (3.8)	145 (5.7)	142 (5.6)	127 (5.0)	132 (5.2)	152 (6.0)	169 (6.7)	144 (5.7)	1,417 (55.8)
Average rainy days	17.0	13.5	16.0	16.5	20.6	24.3	26.0	25.4	25.2	26.4	23.0	21.1	255
Source: Meteoblue

== Demographics ==
Population census of Silago
Year	Pop.	±% p.a.
1960	5,315	—
1970	7,459	+3.44%
1975	7,967	+1.33%
1980	9,323	+3.19%
1990	9,733	+0.43%
1995	9,785	+0.10%
2000	10,486	+1.49%
2007	11,163	+0.87%
2010	12,310	+3.62%
2015	12,775	+0.71%
2020	13,116	+0.56%
2024	14,677	+2.74%
Source: Philippine Statistics Authority

== Economy ==
Poverty incidence of Silago (%)

Source: Philippine Statistics Authority

== Education ==
Elementary schools:

Almost all barangays have Elementary / Primary Schools, few are mentioned below:

- Silago Central Elementary School - Barangay Poblacion District I
- Sudmon Elementary School - Barangay Sudmon
- Hingatungan Elementary School - Barangay Hingatungan
- Awayon Elementary School - Barangay Mercedes

High schools:

There are only 4 high schools, which are strategically located at cater far flung areas.

- Silago National Vocational High School - Barangay Poblacion District II
- Hingatungan National High School - Barangay Hingatungan (located at northern portion of the municipality)
- Mercedes National High School - Barangay Mercedes (located at southern portion of the municipality)
- Katipunan National High School - Barangay Katipunan (located at western portion of the municipality)

== Tourism ==
Silago got her name from the word “murcielago” which is a Spanish term for bat, because of this species' dominance in the locality. Proof to this is the giant bat sanctuary at Barangay Catmon. Along the coastal barangays of the town, there are clean beaches and a structure designed by nature lying in the town's deep blue sea known as Pelada Rock, also locally known as “Batong Dako" meaning large rock, which was occupied and utilized as a camp by the Japanese Imperial Army during the Second World War. The peculiar beauty of this rock is enhanced with the abundance of birds hovering and built their nest on it, sea snakes making the rock as their dwelling place, with fish and other marine products surrounding it. The rock is located just a short distance from the shore of Barangay Laguma and Barangay Salvacion.

Farther north, is a natural rock formation with a length of more or less 50 meters from the shore and about 10 meters wide.

The interior of Silago is mountainous, in which is the town's vast forest, home of the wild pigs locally known as “Baboy Ihas”. Among all the municipalities of the province, Silago is identified to have the biggest forest area.

The Municipal Tree Park, established under the administration of former mayor Martin "Boy" Tomol Sr. is another kind of tourist attraction in the municipality where fresh breeze and songs of the birds make the atmosphere pleasantly unique. On its northern part is a clean and clear river suitable for swimming.

Silago is also an emerging surfing destination. Although it is seasonal and the waves are not very big, it is ideal for learners and beginners to exploit.

Giant bats and troops of long-tailed macaque still abound in the town's forested mountain, mostly near the barangay of Katipunan.

In the upper portion of the town, at different locations, are waterfalls. Kagut-an Falls is more or less 1 kilometer away from the national highway, at Barangay Katipunan. This falls is paired with another falls near its vicinity, locally called as Kagut-an Dako Dos Falls, which possesses an exceptional attraction to all who sees it. In the same barangay is another falls called Kagut-an Gamay Falls. In Barangay Mercedes, about 1 kilometer distance from Mercedes Barangay Road, is Sitio Kawayan Falls with a height of about 10 meters.

Another falls is in Barangay Tubod distinctive in structure with matching cave on its opposite side. Water from this falls, along its way meets the Lanang River flow, which also has its own unique attraction.

Aside from Lanang River, which is located at the town's mountain barangay, is the Maag River that crosses along the national highway in Poblacion District 1. This river forms a lake that is suited for boating recreation. At the mouth of the river is the brown fine sand beach of Silago, which is more or less 1 kilometer long.

In the months of November to February, Silago's beaches are ideal for surfing with huge sea waves, comparable to waves in Siargao.

== Government ==
=== Municipal Hymn ===
Commissioned by the Office of the Mayor, this hymn stands as a musical testament to our shared heritage and aspirations. Written and composed through the collaborative artistry of Rev. Fr. Plutarco S. Rodriguez and Mr. Neil A. Mate, the hymn was subsequently institutionalized under the administration of Mayor Martin Palanca Tomol, Sr., ensuring its place in the heart of our community for generations to come.

Silago Hymn
Lyrics	English translation
O lungsod kong mahal ikaw akong ampingan, Tuburan sa kinabuhi sa mga lumulupyo, Ikaw ang pag-laum nga nagagikan sa sidlakan, Ikaw akong pangga-on ug akong mahalon. Silago, Silago, buot ako nga magpabilin kanimo, Ang imong katahom gakson ko hangtud sa kahangturan, Himuon ko ang tanan alang kanimo lungsod ko, Kay ikaw ang gimat-an ko minahal nga yuta. Kalimpyo, kahimsug ug kalinaw, mao ang dalan sa Kalambuan, Ug kining akong kinabuhi ihalad ko kanimo Silago, Luha sa kagul-anan modagayday kung ikaw pasipad-an, Kalipay og katawa ang matagamtaman, Kung ang bidlisiw sa kalampusan makit-an. Silago, Silago, matin-aw pa ang suba sa paglaum, Malunhaw pa gihapon ang tanaman sa kabukiran, Ang balod sa kadagatan may panahon pa sa iyang paglurang, O, Silago, ikaw ang lungsod kong mahal! O, Silago, ikaw ang lungsod kong mahal!	Oh my beloved town, I will take care of you, The source of life among the dwellers, You are the hope that comes from the east, You are the one I'll embrace and love. Silago, Silago, I desire to stay with you, Your beauty I shall embrace forever, I will do everything for you, my beloved town, Because you awaken me, my beloved land. Cleanliness, Well-being, and Peace, is what you bring to Progress, And I'll give my life to you, Silago, The tears of anguish would flow away if you are harmed, Joy and laughter would be experienced, If the shine of success would be seen. Silago, Silago, the hope is clear as your rivers, Such as green as the harvest in the plains, The strong waves of the seas would someday be calm, Oh, Silago, you are my beloved town! Oh, Silago, you are my beloved town!
