= Hinunangan =

Municipality in Southern Leyte, Philippines

- Municipality
- Municipality of Hinunangan
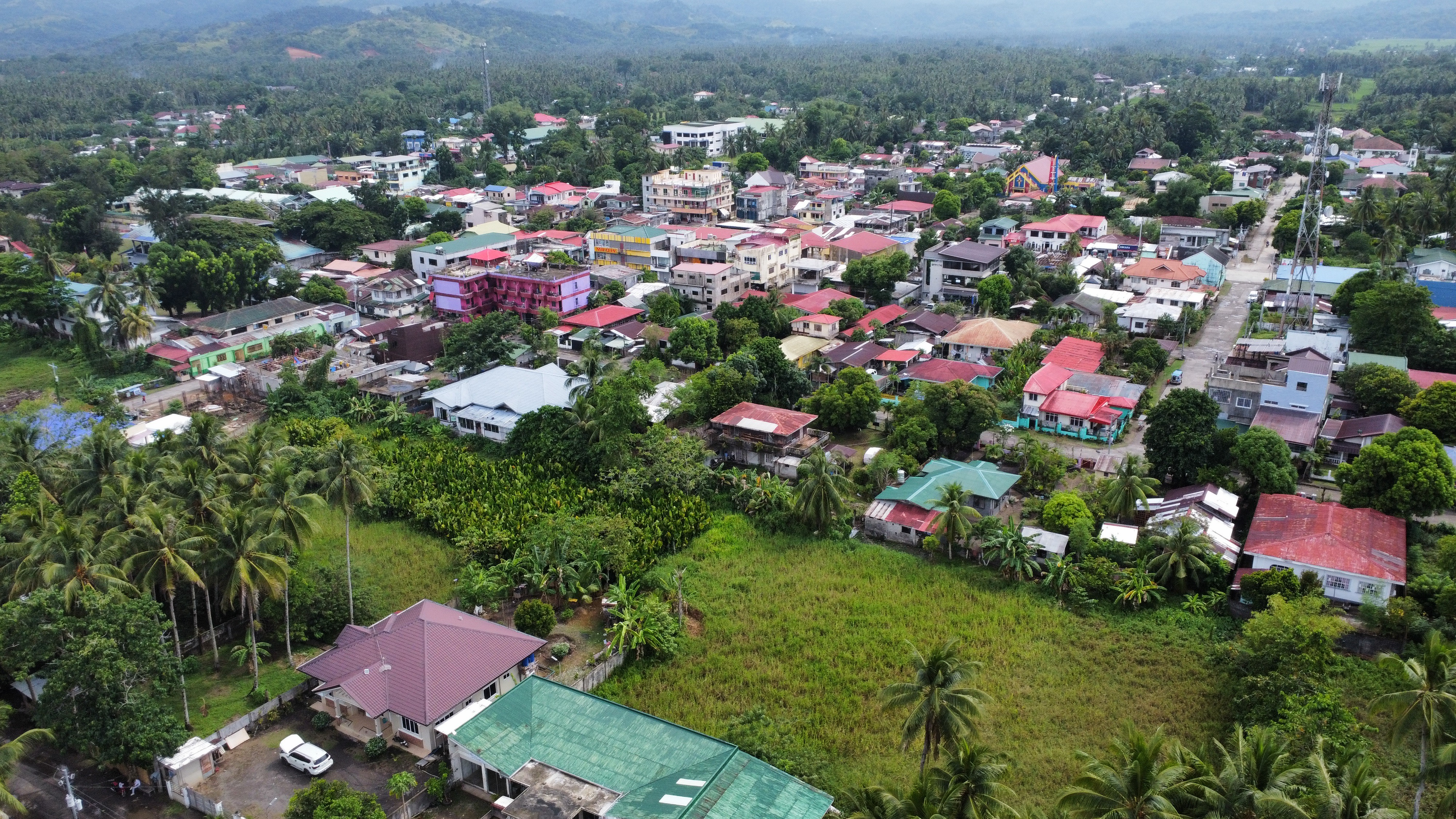
- Aerial view of Hinunangan

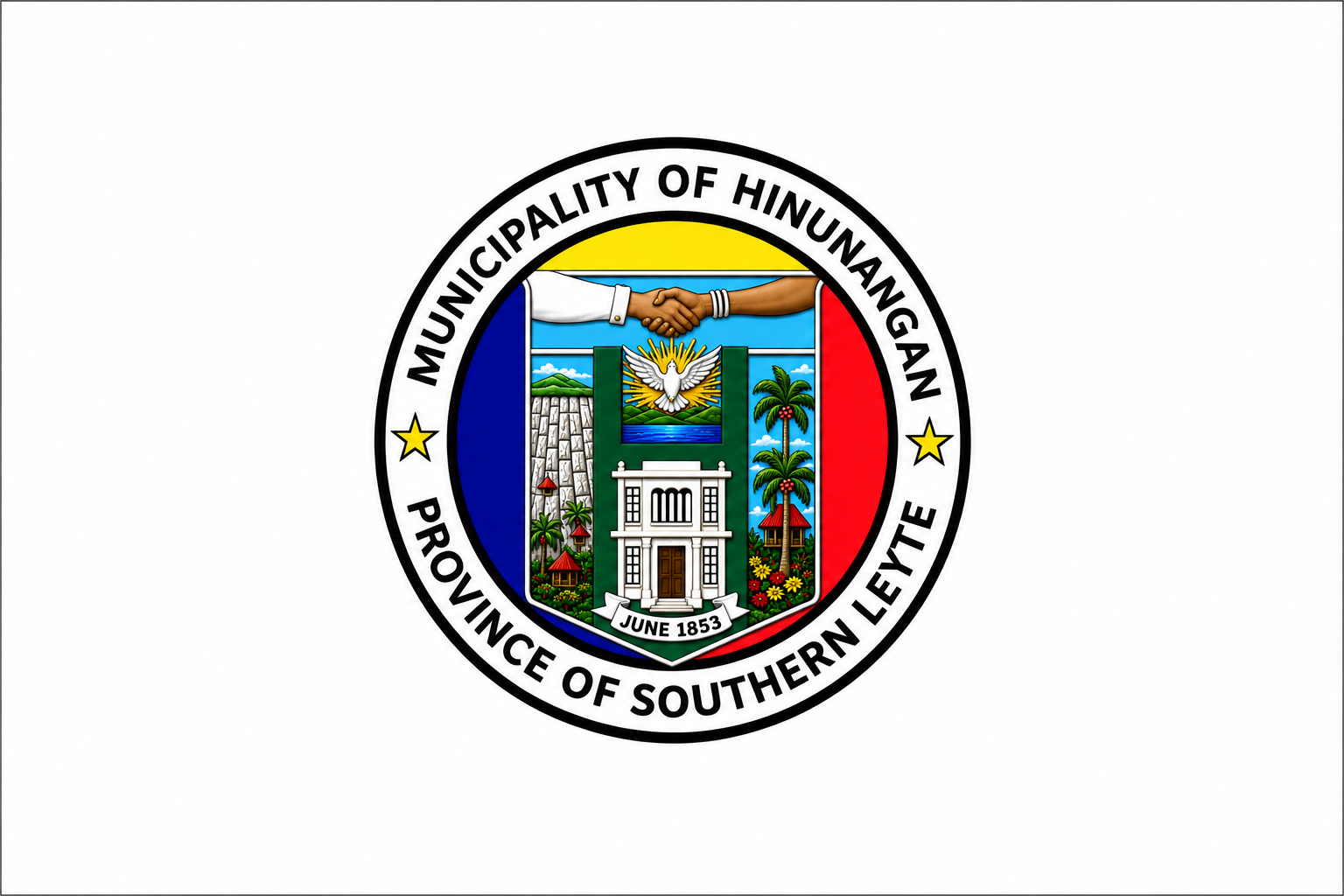
- Flag Seal
- Motto: Rice Granary of Southern Leyte
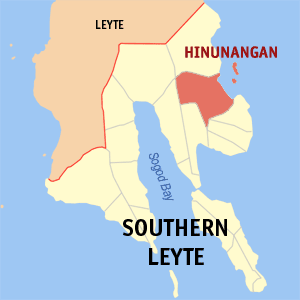
- Map of Southern Leyte with Hinunangan highlighted
- Interactive map of Hinunangan
- Location within the Philippines
- Coordinates: 10°24′N 125°12′E
- Country: Philippines
- Region: Eastern Visayas
- Province: Southern Leyte
- District: 2nd district
- Barangays: 40 (see Barangays)

Government
  - Type: Sangguniang Bayan
  - Mayor: Reynaldo C. Fernandez (PDPLBN)
  - Vice Mayor: Marian D. Pelin (PDPLBN)
  - Representative: Christopherson M. Yap
  - Municipal Council: Members: Ymard Joseph T. Tocmo; Gary L. Comeling; Elmer E. Jumangit; Ryan M. Fernandez; Junwil P. Dy; Gezar S. Ngoho; Socorro C. Alas; Dennis C. Pagpaguitan
  - Electorate: 22,008 voters (2025)

Area
  - Total: 170.58 km^{2} (65.86 sq mi)
- Elevation: 4.8 m (16 ft)
- Highest elevation: 401 m (1,316 ft)
- Lowest elevation: −1 m (−3.3 ft)

Population (2024 census)
  - Total: 30,384
  - Density: 178.12/km^{2} (461.33/sq mi)
  - Households: 7,402

Economy
  - Income class: 2nd municipal income class
  - Poverty incidence: 15.28% (2023)
  - Revenue: ₱ 23.75 million (2024)
  - Assets: ₱ 454.7 million (2024)
  - Expenditure: ₱ 169 million (2024)
  - Liabilities: ₱ 87.7 million (2024)

Service provider
  - Electricity: Southern Leyte Electric Cooperative (SOLECO)
- Time zone: UTC+8 (PST)
- ZIP code: 6608
- PSGC: 0806403000
- IDD : area code: +63 (0)53
- Native languages: Boholano dialect Cebuano; Tagalog

Hinunangan, officially the Municipality of Hinunangan (Kabalian: Lungsod san Hinunangan; Cebuano: Lungsod sa Hinunangan; Tagalog: Bayan ng Hinunangan), is a municipality in the province of Southern Leyte, Philippines. According to the 2024 census, it has a population of 30,384 people.

== History ==
Hinunangan, originally known as Hononganan (meaning "resting place"), has a history dating back to 1521, when Ferdinand Magellan recorded its sighting during his voyage through Leyte Gulf. By 1750, the area had become a midway trading station for Boholano merchants trading in Eastern Leyte. These traders would moor their boats and rest overnight at the mouth of the Das-ay River, where they built a shelter known as a "hononganan" or stopover, which later became the town’s namesake.

In 1822, Palonoy, a Boholano settler, formally established Hinunangan as a permanent settlement. At the time, Silago (north) and Hinundayan and Anahawan (south) were part of Hinunangan’s territory. The town later became a mission station under Abuyog, with Fray Pedro Monasterio arriving in 1850. Due to difficulty pronouncing "Hononganan," he began referring to it as "Hinunangan", a name that became official.

The Hinunangan Parish was formally established on March 26, 1851, with Fray Pedro as its first parish priest. In 1853, Palonoy donated land for the construction of Hinunangan Church, which was built using hardwood, reflecting the town’s strong religious foundations. The Municipal Building and Parochial House were initially built from nipa, signifying the greater importance given to religious structures over government institutions at the time.

By 1886, Hinunangan had a population of 5,140 and 1,338 taxpayers, with rice, abaca, corn, and coconut as its main agricultural products. The town also had a community-supported primary school under Fray Pedro’s guidance. Over time, Silago, Hinundayan, and Anahawan became independent parishes and later separate municipalities.

Hinunangan also played a role in World War II history. In 1944, during the Battle of Leyte Gulf—the largest naval battle in history—a blocking warship of the Allied Liberation forces engaged the Japanese fleet near Hinunangan, marking the area as a significant frontier in Philippine and global history.

Today, Hinunangan remains a historic coastal town with deep cultural and religious roots, shaped by centuries of trade, colonization, and war.

=== 2007 earthquake ===
On July 19, 2007, a magnitude 6 earthquake struck Hinunangan, causing an estimated ₱1.65 million in damages—₱790,000 to government infrastructure and ₱860,000 to private properties.

Public damage included the water system (₱500,000), Das-ay Bridge railguard (₱100,000), and several schools, while private losses affected the Roman Catholic bell tower (₱100,000), Catholic convent water tank (₱40,000), chapels, homes (₱400,000), and appliances (₱290,000). The disaster impacted key facilities, but recovery efforts followed soon after.

== Geography ==
Hinunangan is home to the highest mountain in the province, Mount Nacolod, with an elevation of 948 metres (3,110 ft) above sea level.

=== Barangays ===
Hinunangan is politically subdivided into 40 barangays. Each barangay consists of puroks and some have sitios.

There are two of which are island barangays located at the east of the town. The twin islands are accessible by motorized boats through Barangay Canipa-an.

Barangay	Population (2007)	Population (2010)	Population (2015)	Population (2020)
Ambacon	637	637	▲678	▼615
Badiangon	647	▼589	▲641	▲681
Bangcas A	668	▲743	▲777	▲862
Bangcas B	903	▲959	▲982	▼913
Biasong	609	▼566	▲599	▲652
Bugho	961	▲1,003	▲1,061	▲1,147
Calag-itan	1,167	▲1,180	▲1,206	▼1,163
Calayugan	678	▲700	▲754	▲866
Calinao	317	▼264	▼261	▼218
Canipaan	1,425	▲1,509	▲1,635	▼1,611
Catublian	1,373	▲1,503	▲1,580	▼1,445
Ilaya	520	▼472	▲518	▼457
Ingan	923	▲1,018	▲1,049	▼937
Labrador	800	▲802	▲844	▼745
Libas	463	▼449	▲512	▼431
Lumbog	363	▼337	▲381	▼334
Manalog	700	▲731	▲754	▲781
Manlico	745	▲752	▲766	▼701
Matin-ao	506	▲520	▲547	▲551
Nava	1,798	▲1,801	▲1,946	▼1,924
Nueva Esperanza	651	▲664	▲683	▲724
Otama	543	▲593	▼531	▼504
Palongpong	405	▲475	▲533	▼488
Panalaron	588	▲677	▲753	▲790
Patong	706	▲710	▲718	▲735
Poblacion	799	▲898	▲923	▼638
Pondol	957	▲993	▲1,035	▼989
Salog	349	▲353	▲374	▼368
Salvacion	519	▼483	▲496	▼483
San Pablo Island	427	▲440	▲460	▼445
San Pedro Island	473	▲486	▲493	▼459
Santo Niño I	559	▼524	▲552	▼513
Santo Niño II	946	▲1,004	▲1,043	▲1,096
Tahusan	920	▲960	▲991	▲1,080
Talisay	553	▲597	▲693	▼663
Tawog	486	▲523	▲557	▲594
Toptop	434	▼419	▲443	▼411
Tuburan	600	▲627	▲635	▼587
Union	397	▼378	▲402	▲404
Upper Bantawon	197	▼162	▲170	▼144

=== Climate ===
Climate data for Hinunangan, Southern Leyte
Month	Jan	Feb	Mar	Apr	May	Jun	Jul	Aug	Sep	Oct	Nov	Dec	Year
Mean daily maximum °C (°F)	28 (82)	29 (84)	29 (84)	30 (86)	30 (86)	30 (86)	29 (84)	29 (84)	29 (84)	29 (84)	29 (84)	29 (84)	29 (84)
Mean daily minimum °C (°F)	22 (72)	22 (72)	22 (72)	23 (73)	25 (77)	25 (77)	25 (77)	25 (77)	25 (77)	24 (75)	24 (75)	23 (73)	24 (75)
Average precipitation mm (inches)	78 (3.1)	57 (2.2)	84 (3.3)	79 (3.1)	118 (4.6)	181 (7.1)	178 (7.0)	169 (6.7)	172 (6.8)	180 (7.1)	174 (6.9)	128 (5.0)	1,598 (62.9)
Average rainy days	16.7	13.8	17.3	18.5	23.2	26.5	27.1	26.0	26.4	27.5	24.6	21.0	268.6
Source: Meteoblue

== Demographics ==
Population census of Hinunangan
Year	Pop.	±% p.a.
1903	8,574	—
1918	11,491	+1.97%
1939	16,983	+1.88%
1948	17,556	+0.37%
1960	12,665	−2.68%
1970	16,142	+2.45%
1975	18,648	+2.94%
1980	20,568	+1.98%
1990	22,454	+0.88%
1995	22,170	−0.24%
2000	25,016	+2.62%
2007	27,712	+1.42%
2010	28,415	+0.92%
2015	29,976	+1.02%
2020	29,149	−0.59%
2024	30,384	+1.00%
Source: Philippine Statistics Authority

== Economy ==
Poverty incidence of Hinunangan (%)

Source: Philippine Statistics Authority

=== Banking and Finance ===
- Philippine National Bank
- Saints Peter & Paul Multi-Purpose Cooperative
- Leyte South Multi-Purpose Cooperative
- BDO Network Bank

== Education ==
=== Primary schools ===
- Hinunangan East Central School
- Hinunangan West Central School
- Holy Rosary Academy of Hinunangan, INC. Elementary School
- Catublian Elementary School
- Nava Elementary School
- Canipaan Elementary School
- Ambacon Elementary School
- Calag-itan Elementary School
- Pondol Elementary School
- Manalog Elementary School
- Patong Elementary School
- Otama Elementary School
- Tahusan Elementary School
- Ingan Elementary School
- Kabaskan Elementary School
- Ilaya Elementary School
- Senda Elementary School
- Tuburan Elementary School

=== Secondary schools ===
- Holy Rosary Academy of Hinunangan, INC. - a Private Roman Catholic school
- Hinunangan National High School - formerly Hinunangan Agricultural and Vocational School
- Canipaan National High School
- Nava National High School
- Sto. Niño National High School

=== Tertiary Schools ===
- Southern Leyte State University - Hinunangan Campus (formerly Southern Leyte Institute of Agriculture and Technology; Hinunangan Agricultural and Vocational School)

=== Others ===
- Hinunangan Skills and Technological Center - TESDA accredited vocational school.

== Healthcare ==
- Zenon T. Lagumbay Memorial Hospital
- Hinunangan Community Hospital

== Communication ==
Mobile:

- Smart Communications (Since 2002)
- Globe Telecom (Since 2004)

Cable television:

- Direct-To-Home (DTH) satellite TV Service providers

Internet:

- SMART 4G Network
- Globe 4G Network
- MKG Fiber Broadband Data Solutions
- NGN Fiber Broadband Data Solutions
- RV-Tech Fiber Broadband Solutions
- Starlink Satellite Broadband

== Gallery ==
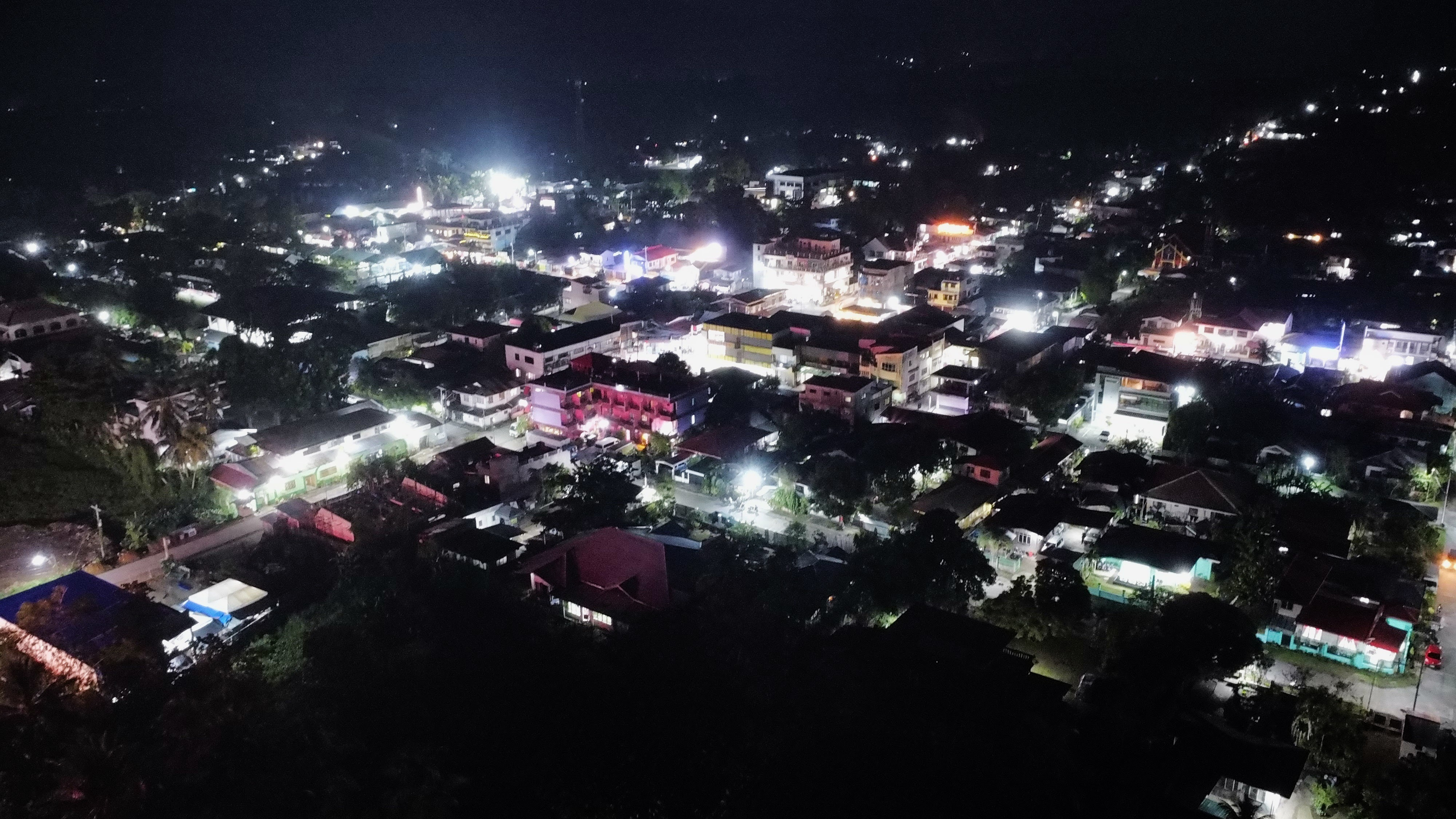
Hinunangan at Night, September 2024

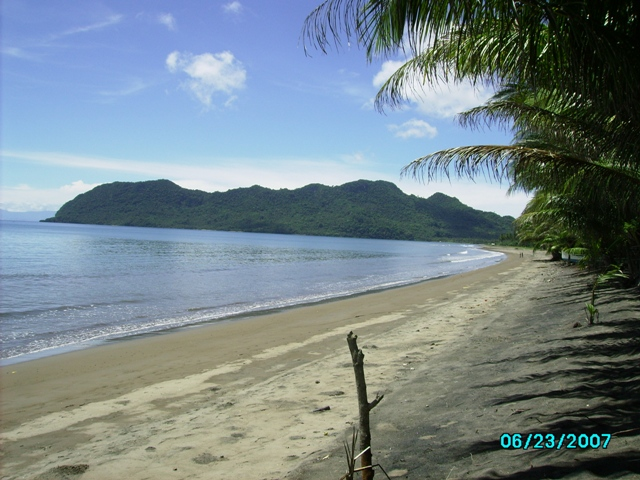
View of Hinunangan Bay from Poblacion

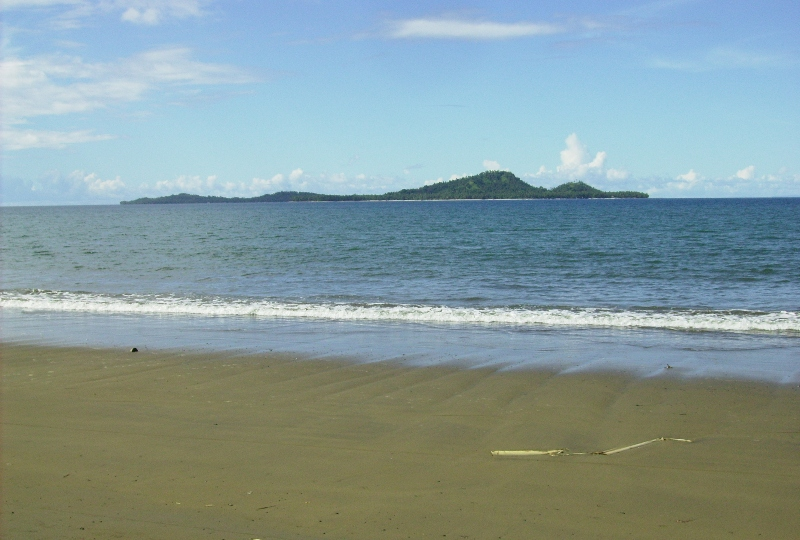
San Pablo and San Pedro Islands off the coast of Hinunangn. The town's major tourist attraction.

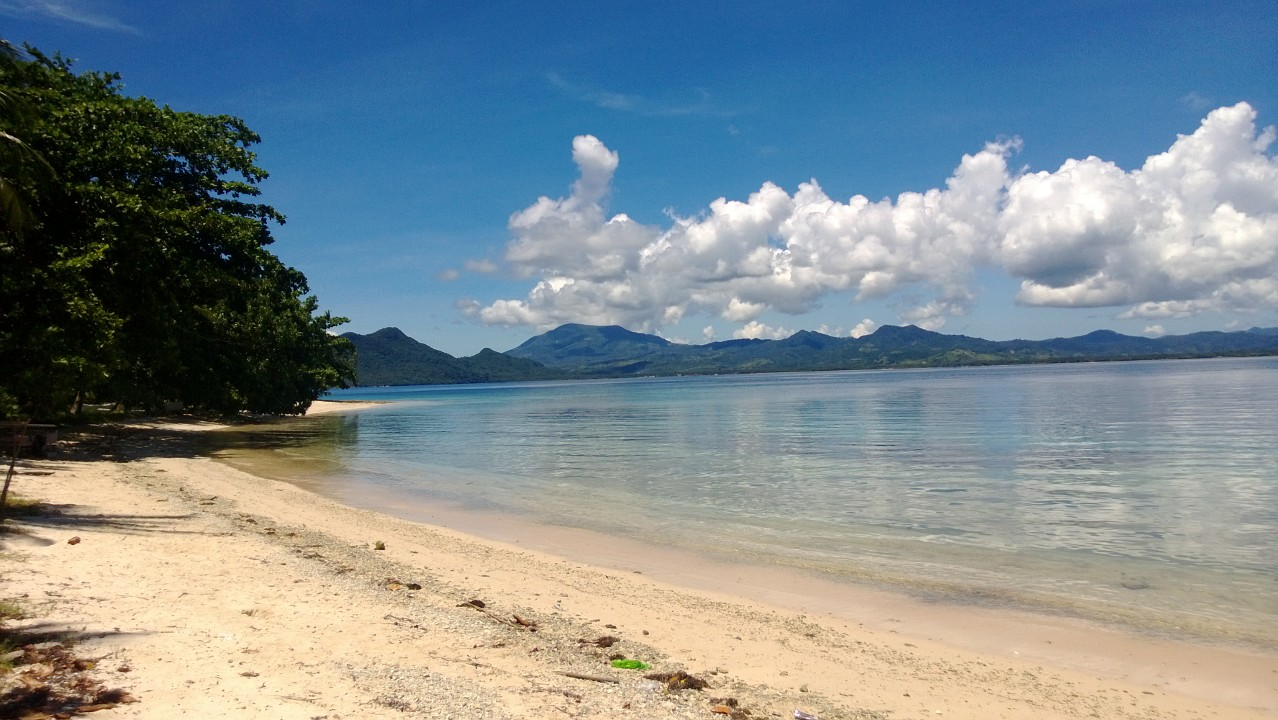
White beach at San Pablo Island, Hinunangan
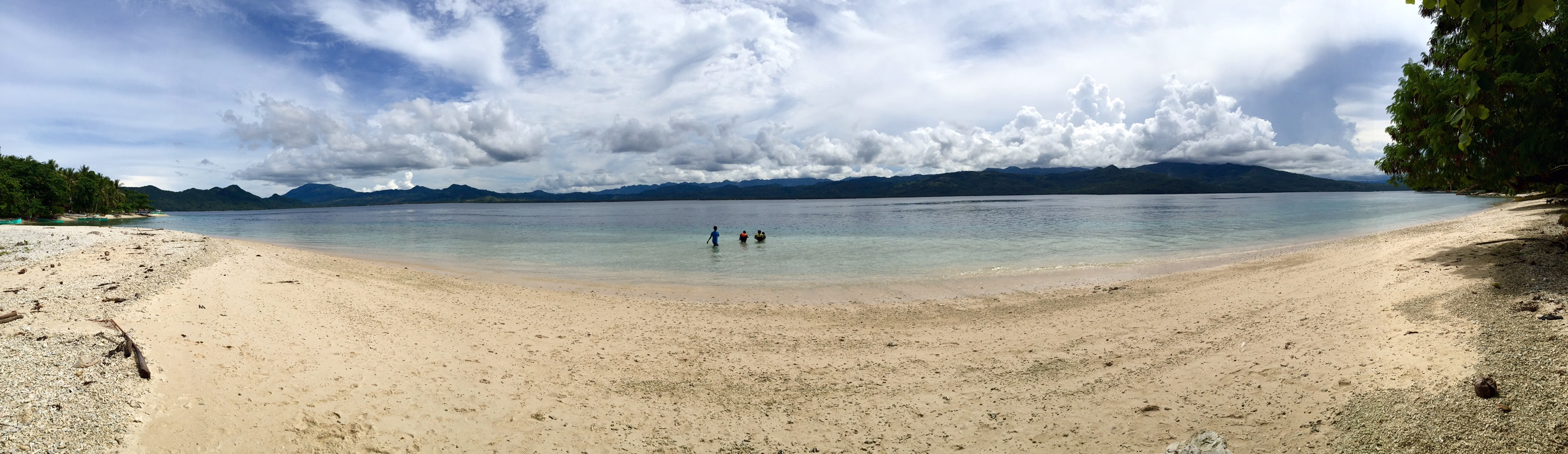
Hinunangan Skyline and Hinunangan Bay from San Pablo Island.
