= San Ricardo =

Municipality in Southern Leyte, Philippines

- Municipality
- Municipality of San Ricardo
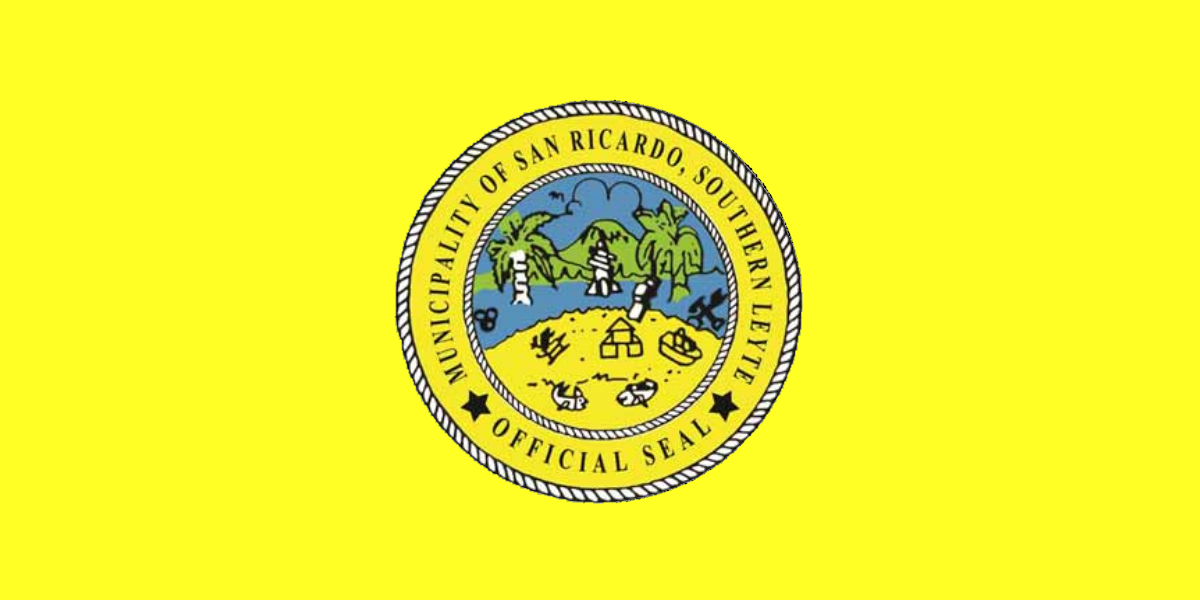
- Flag

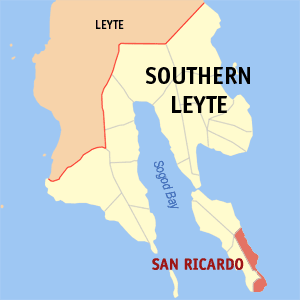
- Map of Southern Leyte with San Ricardo highlighted
- Interactive map of San Ricardo
- Location within the Philippines
- Coordinates: 9°55′N 125°17′E
- Country: Philippines
- Region: Eastern Visayas
- Province: Southern Leyte
- District: 2nd district
- Barangays: 15 (see Barangays)

Government
  - Type: Sangguniang Bayan
  - Mayor: Roy Y. Salinas (PDPLBN)
  - Vice Mayor: Felicisimo M. Reputana (PDPLBN)
  - Representative: Christopherson M. Yap
  - Municipal Council: Members: Joel G. Avila; Rollan L. Salazar; Julius D. Gloria; Perfecto C. Lim Jr.; Adolfo B. Villaren; Sandro L. Aboyot; Jhondell L. Lim; Jaime T. Cagas
  - Electorate: 7,393 voters (2025)

Area
  - Total: 47.56 km^{2} (18.36 sq mi)
- Elevation: 49 m (161 ft)
- Highest elevation: 708 m (2,323 ft)
- Lowest elevation: 0 m (0 ft)

Population (2024 census)
  - Total: 10,385
  - Density: 218.4/km^{2} (565.5/sq mi)
  - Households: 2,304

Economy
  - Income class: 5th municipal income class
  - Poverty incidence: 24.16% (2023)
  - Revenue: ₱ 6.933 million (2024)
  - Assets: ₱ 339.5 million (2024)
  - Expenditure: ₱ 69.84 million (2024)
  - Liabilities: ₱ 51.45 million (2024)

Service provider
  - Electricity: Southern Leyte Electric Cooperative (SOLECO)
- Time zone: UTC+8 (PST)
- ZIP code: 6607
- PSGC: 0806415000
- IDD : area code: +63 (0)53
- Native languages: Boholano dialect Cebuano; Tagalog

San Ricardo, officially the Municipality of San Ricardo (Cebuano: Lungsod sa San Ricardo; Tagalog: Bayan ng San Ricardo), is a municipality in the province of Southern Leyte, Philippines. According to the 2024 census, it has a population of 10,385 people.

== History ==
The town was formerly part of Pintuyan, Southern Leyte and composed of 16 barangays: Alangalang, Benit, Bitoon, Buenavista, Cabutan, Camang, Capingkit, Cogon, Esperanza, Kinachawa (Kinatsawa), Lobo, Piinut-an, San Ramon, San Ricardo, Saub, and Timba.

On October 24, 1965, it became a separate town through Executive Order 194 signed by President Diosdado Macapagal.

== Geography ==
San Ricado is 152 kilometers (94 mi) from Maasin, the provincial capital, and 190 kilometers (120 mi) from Tacloban, the regional capital of Eastern Visayas.

The town's coastal waters are part of the Panaon Island Protected Seascape.

=== Barangays ===
San Ricardo is politically subdivided into 15 barangays. Each barangay consists of puroks, and some have sitios.

- Benit
- Bitoon
- Cabutan
- Camang
- Esperanza
- Esperanza Dos
- Inolinan
- Kinachawa
- Looc
- Pinut-an
- Poblacion (Santiago)
- San Antonio (Alangalang)
- San Ramon
- Saub
- Timba

=== Climate ===
Climate data for San Ricardo, Southern Leyte
Month	Jan	Feb	Mar	Apr	May	Jun	Jul	Aug	Sep	Oct	Nov	Dec	Year
Mean daily maximum °C (°F)	27 (81)	27 (81)	28 (82)	29 (84)	30 (86)	29 (84)	29 (84)	29 (84)	30 (86)	29 (84)	29 (84)	28 (82)	29 (84)
Mean daily minimum °C (°F)	23 (73)	23 (73)	23 (73)	23 (73)	25 (77)	25 (77)	25 (77)	25 (77)	25 (77)	25 (77)	24 (75)	24 (75)	24 (75)
Average precipitation mm (inches)	210 (8.3)	161 (6.3)	123 (4.8)	85 (3.3)	148 (5.8)	186 (7.3)	164 (6.5)	157 (6.2)	141 (5.6)	190 (7.5)	223 (8.8)	200 (7.9)	1,988 (78.3)
Average rainy days	21.0	16.8	18.5	18.2	24.9	27.7	28.4	27.0	26.1	27.6	24.6	22.0	282.8
Source: Meteoblue

== Demographics ==
Population census of San Ricardo
Year	Pop.	±% p.a.
1975	6,521	—
1980	7,331	+2.37%
1990	9,723	+2.86%
1995	7,869	−3.89%
2000	8,964	+2.83%
2007	9,490	+0.79%
2010	10,078	+2.21%
2015	10,494	+0.77%
2020	10,500	+0.01%
2024	10,385	−0.26%
Source: Philippine Statistics Authority

== Economy ==
Poverty incidence of San Ricardo (%)

Source: Philippine Statistics Authority

== Transportation ==
=== Seaport ===
San Ricardo Port, also known as Benit Port, is a Roll-on/roll-off port serving routes to and from Lipata Port, Surigao City, and connects to the Visayas and Mindanao segments of the Pan-Philippine Highway. Montenegro Shipping Lines is the primary ferry service for Lipata Port and Benit Port.

=== Land ===
San Ricardo also has a bus terminal, named Benit Integrated Bus Terminal, with routes to and from Manila and Davao. DLTBCo, Ultrabus, CUL Transportation, and other bus companies provide transportation from San Ricardo to Luzon. Bachelor Express also serves San Ricardo with routes from Davao to Ormoc and Tacloban.
