= Liloan, Southern Leyte =

Municipality in Southern Leyte, Philippines

Liloan
- Municipality
- Municipality of Liloan
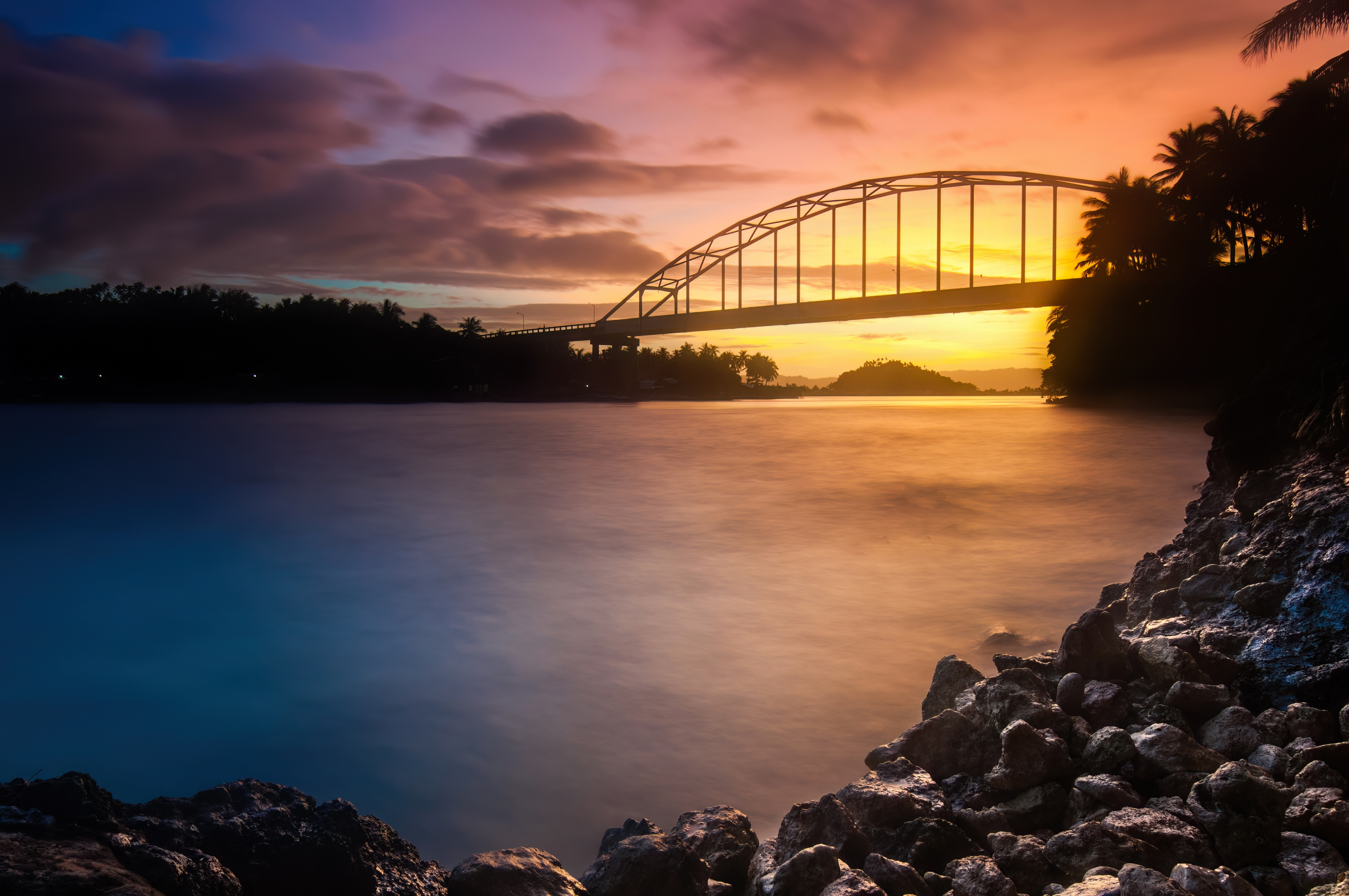
- Wawa Bridge

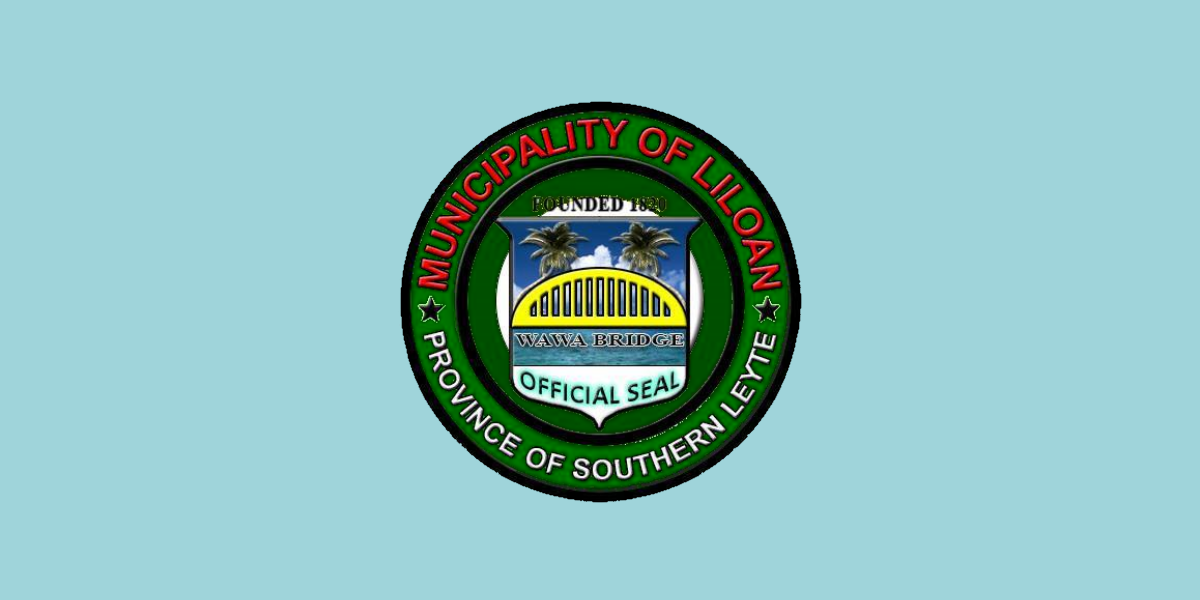
- Flag
- Etymology: Cebuano term lilo, meaning whirlpool
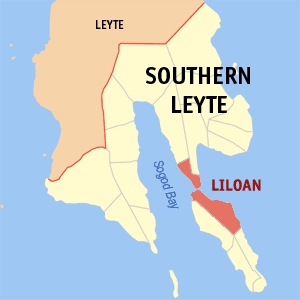
- Map of Southern Leyte with Liloan highlighted
- Interactive map of Liloan
- Location within the Philippines
- Coordinates: 10°09′41″N 125°07′49″E
- Country: Philippines
- Region: Eastern Visayas
- Province: Southern Leyte
- District: 2nd district
- Barangays: 24 (see Barangays)

Government
  - Type: Sangguniang Bayan
  - Mayor: Jonna C. Adan (PDPLBN)
  - Vice Mayor: Shirlita Y. Chong (PDPLBN)
  - Representative: Christopherson M. Yap
  - Municipal Council: Members: Welfredo S. Chua; Joseph T. Lim; Alex C. Lim; Victor L. Chua Jr.; Mary Ann Baquero-Aranzado; Rodolfo C. Cuares; Gabriel Angelo P. Maamo; Restituto E. Handayan
  - Electorate: 15,341 voters (2025)

Area
  - Total: 50.30 km^{2} (19.42 sq mi)
- Elevation: 38 m (125 ft)
- Highest elevation: 433 m (1,421 ft)
- Lowest elevation: 0 m (0 ft)

Population (2024 census)
  - Total: 23,787
  - Density: 472.9/km^{2} (1,225/sq mi)
  - Households: 5,353

Economy
  - Income class: 3rd municipal income class
  - Poverty incidence: 24.48% (2023)
  - Revenue: ₱ 22.38 million (2024)
  - Assets: ₱ 509.7 million (2024)
  - Expenditure: ₱ 131.3 million (2024)
  - Liabilities: ₱ 135.3 million (2024)

Service provider
  - Electricity: Southern Leyte Electric Cooperative (SOLECO)
- Time zone: UTC+8 (PST)
- ZIP code: 6612
- PSGC: 0806406000
- IDD : area code: +63 (0)53
- Native languages: Boholano dialect Cebuano; Tagalog

Liloan, officially the Municipality of Liloan (Cebuano: Lungsod sa Liloan; Tagalog: Bayan ng Liloan), is a municipality in the province of Southern Leyte, Philippines. According to the 2024 census, it has a population of 23,787 people.

Liloan's town center is located at the northern part of Panaon Island which is connected to the mainland of Leyte by the Wawa Bridge.

"Liloan" is derived from the local term lilo, meaning "whirlpool". Whirlpools can be seen at Panaon Strait, the narrow waterway between mainland Leyte island and Panaon Island.

== Geography ==
Most of Liloan are located in Panaon Island, whose coastal waters are also part of the Panaon Island Protected Seascape. But there are also parts of it located in the main island of Leyte.

=== Barangays ===
Liloan is politically subdivided into 24 barangays. Each barangay consists of puroks and some have sitios.

- Amaga*
- Anilao
- Bahay
- Cagbungalon
- Cali-an
- Caligangan
- Catig/Caritas Village
- Candayuman
- Estela
- Fatima
- Gud-an
- Guintoylan
- Himay-angan*
- Ilag*
- Magaupas*
- Malangsa
- Pres. Quezon (Maugoc)
- Molopolo*
- Pandan
- Poblacion
- President Roxas (Nailong)*
- San Isidro
- San Roque
- Tabugon*

* -This indicates a mainland Barangay.

=== Climate ===
Climate data for Liloan, Southern Leyte
Month	Jan	Feb	Mar	Apr	May	Jun	Jul	Aug	Sep	Oct	Nov	Dec	Year
Mean daily maximum °C (°F)	28 (82)	28 (82)	29 (84)	31 (88)	31 (88)	31 (88)	30 (86)	30 (86)	30 (86)	29 (84)	29 (84)	28 (82)	30 (85)
Mean daily minimum °C (°F)	23 (73)	23 (73)	23 (73)	24 (75)	24 (75)	25 (77)	24 (75)	24 (75)	24 (75)	24 (75)	24 (75)	23 (73)	24 (75)
Average precipitation mm (inches)	98 (3.9)	82 (3.2)	96 (3.8)	71 (2.8)	104 (4.1)	129 (5.1)	101 (4.0)	94 (3.7)	99 (3.9)	135 (5.3)	174 (6.9)	143 (5.6)	1,326 (52.3)
Average rainy days	18.0	14.1	17.1	16.8	23.7	25.7	25.8	23.3	24.4	25.9	24.0	20.6	259.4
Source: Meteoblue

== Demographics ==
Population census of Liloan
Year	Pop.	±% p.a.
1903	4,319	—
1918	11,496	+6.74%
1939	17,386	+1.99%
1948	19,233	+1.13%
1960	12,772	−3.35%
1970	13,882	+0.84%
1975	15,639	+2.42%
1980	16,923	+1.59%
1990	18,383	+0.83%
1995	17,160	−1.28%
2000	19,838	+3.16%
2007	22,203	+1.57%
2010	22,817	+1.00%
2015	23,981	+0.95%
2020	24,800	+0.71%
2024	23,787	−1.00%
Source: Philippine Statistics Authority

- The upsurge of the population of Barangay Fatima is due to the relocation of almost all residents of Malangza and Catig because of the frequent threats of landslides.

== Economy ==
Poverty incidence of Liloan (%)

Source: Philippine Statistics Authority

== Tourism ==
1. Bitoon Beach,
2. Molopolo Beach, at Brgy Molopolo
3. Tagbak Marine Park
4. Our Lady of Mt. Carmel Cross
5. Duwangan Beach
6. Liloan Lighthouse
7. Liloan Ferry Terminal
8. Pres. Quezon (Maugoc) Pook Adventure Park
9. Ollie's Wall (Dive Site) at Gud-an
10. Washing Machine Dive at Wawa channel
11. Maga-upas Color (Busay) Water Falls at Brgy Magaupas
12. Asug Cave at Brgy Nailong (Pres. Roxas) and Brgy Ilag.
13. Puti na Bato AKA White Horse, a Rock Cliff formation with a printed shape of a white horse at Brgy Ilag

== Transportation ==
=== Land ===
Philtranco serves Liloan from Pasay to Davao. Other major bus companies including DLTBCo, CUL Transportation, Ultrabus and Bachelor Express also serve Liloan from Maasin, Ormoc, Tacloban, and Calbayog.

=== Sea ===
Liloan Port or also known as Liloan Ferry Terminal is a roro port that serves a local point from Manila and Davao, as well as a local point from Lipata Port, also connects to the Pan-Philippine Highway also called Maharlika Highway AH26 that originates from Laoag to its southern terminus Zamboanga City. FastCat is one of the primary shipping line that serves to and from Lipata Port, Surigao City. Other major shipping line including Santa Clara Shipping Corporation and Starlite Ferries also serves Liloan from Lipata.

== See also ==
- Liloan, Cebu - a municipality in Cebu
- Liloan - a barangay in Santander, Cebu
