= Leyte's 1st congressional district =

Legislative district of the Philippines

- Constituency for the House of Representatives of the Philippines
- Boundary of Leyte's 1st congressional district in Leyte
- Location of Leyte within the Philippines
- Province: Leyte
- Region: Eastern Visayas
- Population: 534,120 (2020)
- Electorate: 335,609 (2025)
- Major settlements: 8 LGUs: Cities; Tacloban; Municipalities; Alangalang; Babatngon; Palo; San Miguel; Santa Fe; Tanauan; Tolosa
- Area: 988.74 km^{2} (381.75 sq mi)

Current constituency
- Created: 1907
- Representative: Martin Romualdez
- Political party: Lakas
- Congressional bloc: Majority

Leyte's 1st congressional district is one of the five congressional districts of the Philippines in the province of Leyte. It has been represented in the House of Representatives of the Philippines since 1916 and earlier in the Philippine Assembly from 1907 to 1916. The district consists of the provincial capital, Tacloban, and adjacent municipalities of Alangalang, Babatngon, Palo, San Miguel, Santa Fe, Tanauan and Tolosa since 1987. It is currently represented in the 20th Congress by Martin Romualdez of the Lakas–CMD (Lakas), who served as the House Speaker from July 2022 to September 2025.

Until 1931, it consisted of the sub-province of Biliran and the northwestern municipalities of Albuera, Baybay, Calubian, Leyte, Merida, Ormoc, Palompon, San Isidro, and Villaba. Following the creation of the fifth district, Albuera, Baybay, and Ormoc were redistricted to the second district, while other municipalities were retained; Isabel, Matag-ob, and Tabango were later established as new municipalities after the district was re-created in 1945. Following the creation of Southern Leyte in 1959, these areas under this district were reapportioned to the third district, and the district was redefined to consist of the city of Tacloban and the eastern municipalities of Abuyog, Babatngon, Dulag, Javier, MacArthur, Mahaplag, Mayorga, Palo, San Miguel, Santa Fe, Tanauan, and Tolosa, all previously from the fourth district, from 1961 until its second dissolution in 1972.

Together with Negros Occidental's 3rd district, Leyte's 1st district has seen two House Speakers, tied for the most by any district: Daniel Z. Romualdez and his nephew, Martin Romualdez.

== Representation history ==
#	Image	Member	Term of office		Legislature	Party	Electoral history	Constituent LGUs
#	Image	Member	Start	End	Legislature	Party	Electoral history	Constituent LGUs
=== Leyte's 1st district for the Philippine Assembly ===
District created January 9, 1907.
1		Quiremón Alkuino	October 16, 1907	October 16, 1909	1st	Nacionalista	Elected in 1907.	1907–1909; Baybay, Caibiran, Kawayan, Leyte, Merida, Naval, Ormoc, Palompon, San Isidro
2		Estanislao Granados	October 16, 1909	October 16, 1916	2nd	Nacionalista	Elected in 1909.	1909–1916; Baybay, Biliran, Caibiran, Kawayan, Leyte, Merida, Naval, Ormoc, Palompon, San Isidro, Villaba
2		Estanislao Granados	October 16, 1909	October 16, 1916	3rd	Nacionalista	Re-elected in 1912.	1909–1916; Baybay, Biliran, Caibiran, Kawayan, Leyte, Merida, Naval, Ormoc, Palompon, San Isidro, Villaba
=== Leyte's 1st district for the House of Representatives of the Philippine Islands ===
3		Manuel B. Veloso	October 16, 1916	June 3, 1919	4th	Nacionalista	Elected in 1916.	1916–1919; Baybay, Biliran, Caibiran, Kawayan, Leyte, Maripipi, Merida, Naval, Ormoc, Palompon, San Isidro, Villaba
4		Francisco Delgado Enage	June 3, 1919	June 6, 1922	5th	Nacionalista	Elected in 1919.	1919–1931; Albuera, Baybay, Biliran, Caibiran, Calubian, Kawayan, Leyte, Maripipi, Merida, Naval, Ormoc, Palompon, San Isidro, Villaba
5		Carlos S. Tan	June 6, 1922	June 2, 1925	6th	Nacionalista; Colectivista	Elected in 1922.	1919–1931; Albuera, Baybay, Biliran, Caibiran, Calubian, Kawayan, Leyte, Maripipi, Merida, Naval, Ormoc, Palompon, San Isidro, Villaba
6		Juan Veloso	June 2, 1925	June 5, 1928	7th	Nacionalista; Consolidado	Elected in 1925.	1919–1931; Albuera, Baybay, Biliran, Caibiran, Calubian, Kawayan, Leyte, Maripipi, Merida, Naval, Ormoc, Palompon, San Isidro, Villaba
7		Bernardo Torres	June 5, 1928	June 2, 1931	8th	Nacionalista; Consolidado	Elected in 1928.	1919–1931; Albuera, Baybay, Biliran, Caibiran, Calubian, Kawayan, Leyte, Maripipi, Merida, Naval, Ormoc, Palompon, San Isidro, Villaba
(5)		Carlos S. Tan	June 2, 1931	September 16, 1935	9th	Nacionalista; Consolidado	Elected in 1931.	1931–1935; Biliran, Caibiran, Calubian, Kawayan, Leyte, Maripipi, Merida, Naval, Palompon, San Isidro, Villaba
(5)		Carlos S. Tan	June 2, 1931	September 16, 1935	10th	Nacionalista; Democrático	Re-elected in 1934.	1931–1935; Biliran, Caibiran, Calubian, Kawayan, Leyte, Maripipi, Merida, Naval, Palompon, San Isidro, Villaba
#	Image	Member	Term of office		National Assembly	Party	Electoral history	Constituent LGUs
#	Image	Member	Start	End	National Assembly	Party	Electoral history	Constituent LGUs
=== Leyte's 1st district for the National Assembly (Commonwealth of the Philippines) ===
8		Jose Maria Veloso	September 16, 1935	December 30, 1938	1st	Nacionalista; Democrático	Elected in 1935.	1935–1941; Biliran, Caibiran, Calubian, Kawayan, Leyte, Maripipi, Merida, Naval, Palompon, San Isidro, Villaba
(5)		Carlos S. Tan	December 30, 1938	December 30, 1941	2nd	Nacionalista	Elected in 1938.	1935–1941; Biliran, Caibiran, Calubian, Kawayan, Leyte, Maripipi, Merida, Naval, Palompon, San Isidro, Villaba
District dissolved into the two-seat Leyte's at-large district for the National Assembly (Second Philippine Republic).
#	Image	Member	Term of office		Common wealth Congress	Party	Electoral history	Constituent LGUs
#	Image	Member	Start	End	Common wealth Congress	Party	Electoral history	Constituent LGUs
=== Leyte's 1st district for the House of Representatives of the Commonwealth of the Philippines ===
District re-created May 24, 1945.
9		Mateo Canonoy	June 11, 1945	May 25, 1946	1st	Nacionalista	Elected in 1941.	1945–1946; Biliran, Caibiran, Calubian, Kawayan, Leyte, Maripipi, Merida, Naval, Palompon, San Isidro, Villaba
#	Image	Member	Term of office		Congress	Party	Electoral history	Constituent LGUs
#	Image	Member	Start	End	Congress	Party	Electoral history	Constituent LGUs
=== Leyte's 1st district for the House of Representatives of the Philippines ===
(5)		Carlos S. Tan	May 25, 1946	November 11, 1947	1st	Liberal	Elected in 1946. Resigned on election as senator.	1946–1949; Biliran, Caibiran, Calubian, Kawayan, Leyte, Maripipi, Merida, Naval, Palompon, San Isidro, Villaba
10		José R. Martínez	March 23, 1948	December 30, 1949	1st	Liberal	Elected in 1948 to finish Tan's term.	1946–1949; Biliran, Caibiran, Calubian, Kawayan, Leyte, Maripipi, Merida, Naval, Palompon, San Isidro, Villaba
(9)		Mateo Canonoy	December 30, 1949	December 30, 1953	2nd	Nacionalista	Elected in 1949.	1949–1953; Almeria, Biliran, Cabucgayan, Caibiran, Calubian, Isabel, Kawayan, Leyte, Maripipi, Merida, Naval, Palompon, San Isidro, Tabango, Villaba
(5)		Carlos S. Tan	December 30, 1953	December 30, 1957	3rd	Liberal	Elected in 1953.	1953–1957; Almeria, Biliran, Cabucgayan, Caibiran, Calubian, Culaba, Isabel, Kawayan, Leyte, Maripipi, Merida, Naval, Palompon, San Isidro, Tabango, Villaba
11		Marcelino Veloso	December 30, 1957	December 30, 1961	4th	Nacionalista	Elected in 1957. Redistricted to the 3rd district.	1957–1961; Almeria, Biliran, Cabucgayan, Caibiran, Calubian, Culaba, Isabel, Kawayan, Leyte, Maripipi, Matag-ob, Merida, Naval, Palompon, San Isidro, Tabango, Villaba
12		Daniel Z. Romualdez	December 30, 1961	March 22, 1965	5th	Nacionalista	Redistricted from the 4th district and re-elected in 1961. Died in office.	1961–1965; Abuyog, Babatngon, Bugho, Dulag, MacArthur, Mahaplag, Mayorga, Palo, San Miguel, Santa Fe, Tacloban, Tanauan, Tolosa
13		Artemio E. Mate	December 30, 1965	September 23, 1972	6th	Nacionalista	Elected in 1965.	1965–1972; Abuyog, Babatngon, Dulag, Javier, MacArthur, Mahaplag, Mayorga, Palo, San Miguel, Santa Fe, Tacloban, Tanauan, Tolosa
13		Artemio E. Mate	December 30, 1965	September 23, 1972	7th	Nacionalista	Re-elected in 1969. Removed from office after imposition of martial law.	1965–1972; Abuyog, Babatngon, Dulag, Javier, MacArthur, Mahaplag, Mayorga, Palo, San Miguel, Santa Fe, Tacloban, Tanauan, Tolosa
District dissolved into the ten-seat Region VIII's at-large district for the Interim Batasang Pambansa, followed by the five-seat Leyte's at-large district for the Regular Batasang Pambansa.
District re-created February 2, 1987.
14		Cirilo Roy G. Montejo	June 30, 1987	June 30, 1995	8th	UNIDO	Elected in 1987.	1987–present Alangalang, Babatngon, Palo, San Miguel, Santa Fe, Tacloban, Tanauan, Tolosa
14		Cirilo Roy G. Montejo	June 30, 1987	June 30, 1995	9th	LDP	Re-elected in 1992.	1987–present Alangalang, Babatngon, Palo, San Miguel, Santa Fe, Tacloban, Tanauan, Tolosa
14		Cirilo Roy G. Montejo	June 30, 1987	June 30, 1995	9th	Lakas	Re-elected in 1992.	1987–present Alangalang, Babatngon, Palo, San Miguel, Santa Fe, Tacloban, Tanauan, Tolosa
15		Imelda Marcos	June 30, 1995	June 30, 1998	10th	KBL	Elected in 1995.	1987–present Alangalang, Babatngon, Palo, San Miguel, Santa Fe, Tacloban, Tanauan, Tolosa
16		Alfred S. Romualdez	June 30, 1998	June 30, 2001	11th	LAMMP	Elected in 1998.	1987–present Alangalang, Babatngon, Palo, San Miguel, Santa Fe, Tacloban, Tanauan, Tolosa
17		Ted Failon	June 30, 2001	June 30, 2004	12th	Independent	Elected in 2001.	1987–present Alangalang, Babatngon, Palo, San Miguel, Santa Fe, Tacloban, Tanauan, Tolosa
18		Remedios L. Petilla	June 30, 2004	June 30, 2007	13th	Lakas	Elected in 2004.	1987–present Alangalang, Babatngon, Palo, San Miguel, Santa Fe, Tacloban, Tanauan, Tolosa
19		Martin Romualdez	June 30, 2007	June 30, 2016	14th	KAMPI	Elected in 2007.	1987–present Alangalang, Babatngon, Palo, San Miguel, Santa Fe, Tacloban, Tanauan, Tolosa
19		Martin Romualdez	June 30, 2007	June 30, 2016	14th	Lakas	Elected in 2007.	1987–present Alangalang, Babatngon, Palo, San Miguel, Santa Fe, Tacloban, Tanauan, Tolosa
19		Martin Romualdez	June 30, 2007	June 30, 2016	15th	Lakas	Re-elected in 2010.	1987–present Alangalang, Babatngon, Palo, San Miguel, Santa Fe, Tacloban, Tanauan, Tolosa
19		Martin Romualdez	June 30, 2007	June 30, 2016	16th	Lakas	Re-elected in 2013.	1987–present Alangalang, Babatngon, Palo, San Miguel, Santa Fe, Tacloban, Tanauan, Tolosa
20		Yedda Marie Romualdez	June 30, 2016	June 30, 2019	17th	Lakas	Elected in 2016.	1987–present Alangalang, Babatngon, Palo, San Miguel, Santa Fe, Tacloban, Tanauan, Tolosa
(19)		Martin Romualdez	June 30, 2019	Incumbent	18th	Lakas	Elected in 2019.	1987–present Alangalang, Babatngon, Palo, San Miguel, Santa Fe, Tacloban, Tanauan, Tolosa
(19)		Martin Romualdez	June 30, 2019	Incumbent	19th	Lakas	Re-elected in 2022.	1987–present Alangalang, Babatngon, Palo, San Miguel, Santa Fe, Tacloban, Tanauan, Tolosa
(19)		Martin Romualdez	June 30, 2019	Incumbent	20th	Lakas	Re-elected in 2025.	1987–present Alangalang, Babatngon, Palo, San Miguel, Santa Fe, Tacloban, Tanauan, Tolosa

== Election results ==
=== 2025 ===
2025 Philippine House of Representatives elections
Party	Candidate	Votes	%
Lakas	Martin Romualdez	177,486	100.00%
Total votes		177,486	100.00%
Lakas hold			

=== 2022 ===
2022 Philippine House of Representatives elections
Party	Candidate	Votes	%
Lakas	Martin Romualdez	180,806	100.00%
Total votes		180,806	100.00%
Lakas hold			

=== 2019 ===
2019 Philippine House of Representatives elections
Party	Candidate	Votes	%
Lakas	Martin Romualdez	160,401	94.26%
PFP	Lino Dumas	9,764	5.74%
Total votes		170,165	100.00%
Lakas hold			

=== 2016 ===
2016 Philippine House of Representatives elections
Party	Candidate	Votes	%
Lakas	Yedda Marie Romualdez	147,477	73.66%
Independent	Fiel Clemencio	51,550	25.75%
Independent	Ka-Poly Jacla	1,191	0.59%
Valid ballots		200,218	81.29%
Margin of victory		95,927	47.91%
Invalid or blank votes		46,082	18.71%
Total votes		246,300	100.00%
Lakas hold			

=== 2013 ===
2013 Philippine House of Representatives elections
Party	Candidate	Votes	%
Lakas	Martin Romualdez	122,022	56.05%
Invalid or blank votes		95,672	43.95%
Total votes		217,694	100.00%
Lakas hold			

=== 2010 ===
2010 Philippine House of Representatives elections
Party	Candidate	Votes	%
Lakas–Kampi	Martin Romualdez	99,807	60.05
Independent	Fiel Clemencio	66,403	39.95
Valid ballots		166,210	86.01
Invalid or blank votes		27,031	13.99
Total votes		193,241	100.00
Lakas–Kampi hold			

== See also ==
- Legislative districts of Leyte

House of Representatives of the Philippines
Preceded by Leyte's 4th congressional district	Home district of the speaker January 22 – March 9, 1962	Succeeded by Capiz's 2nd congressional district
Preceded by Marinduque's at-large congressional district	Home district of the speaker July 25, 2022 — September 17, 2025	Succeeded by Isabela's 6th congressional district
