= Legislative districts of Biliran =

Districts of Philippine province

The legislative districts of Biliran are the representations of the province of Biliran in the Congress of the Philippines. The province is currently represented in the lower house of the Congress through its lone congressional district.

It was represented as part of the third district of Leyte in 1995.

== Current districts ==
Legislative districts and representatives of Biliran
District	Current Representative	Party	Constituent LGUs	Population (2020)	Area					
District	Lone	Party	Constituent LGUs	Population (2020)	Area	Gerardo J. Espina Jr. (since 2019)	Lakas	List: Almeria; Biliran; Cabucgayan; Caibiran; Culaba; Kawayan; Maripipi; Naval	179,312	536.01 km²

== See also ==
- Legislative districts of Leyte
