= Cabucgayan =

Municipality in Biliran, Philippines

Cabucgayan Kabukgayan
- Municipality
- Municipality of Cabucgayan
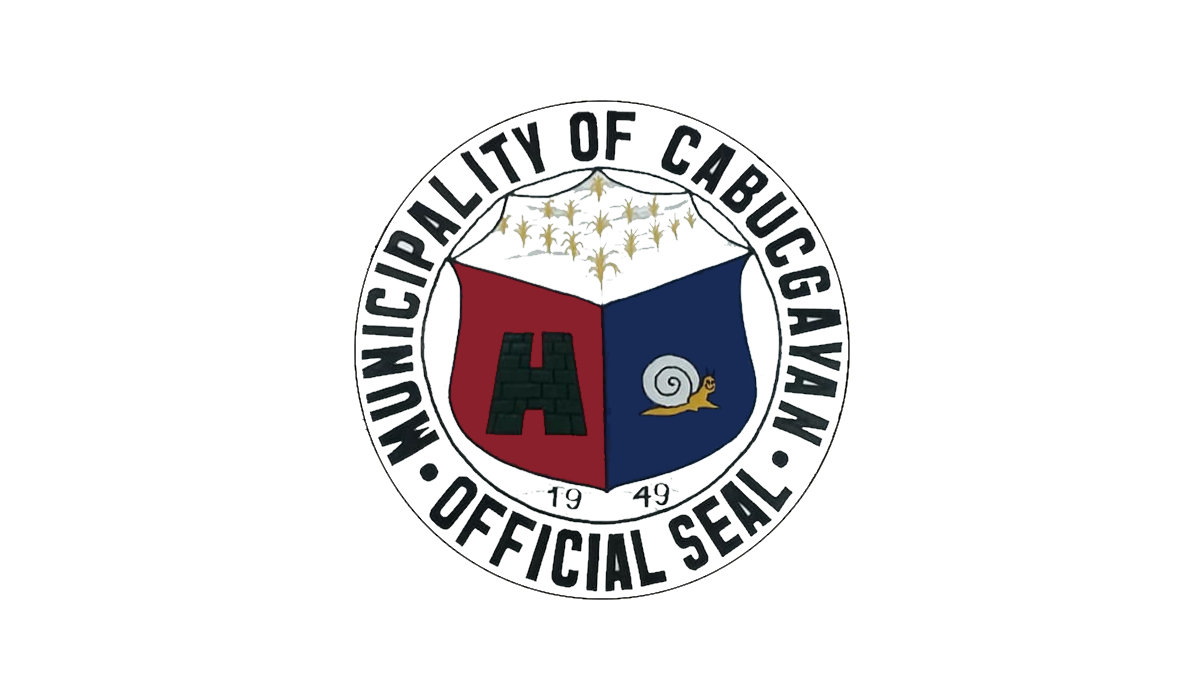
- Flag
- Etymology: Bugkay to Kabukgayan
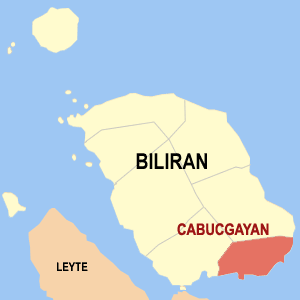
- Map of Biliran with Cabucgayan highlighted
- Interactive map of Cabucgayan
- Location within the Philippines
- Coordinates: 11°28′19″N 124°34′30″E
- Country: Philippines
- Region: Eastern Visayas
- Province: Biliran
- District: Lone district
- Founded: September 29, 1949
- Barangays: 13 (see Barangays)

Government
  - Type: Sangguniang Bayan
  - Mayor: Marisol A. Masbang
  - Vice Mayor: Gemma G. Adobo
  - Representative: Gerardo J. Espina Jr.
  - Councilors: List: • Paul T. Juntilla; • Mario L. Oledan; • Jose Marie T. Torregoza; • Lynn E. Mckinnery; • Jessie A. Lamoste; • Celestino P. Ticoy; • Edwin T. Igano; • Tarcelita A. Egano; DILG Masterlist of Officials
  - Electorate: 15,342 voters (2025)

Area
  - Total: 54.19 km^{2} (20.92 sq mi)
- Highest elevation: 1,110 m (3,640 ft)
- Lowest elevation: 0 m (0 ft)

Population (2024 census)
  - Total: 21,923
  - Density: 404.6/km^{2} (1,048/sq mi)
  - Households: 5,234

Economy
  - Income class: 4th municipal income class
  - Poverty incidence: 14.67% (2023)
  - Revenue: ₱ 122.3 million (2024)
  - Assets: ₱ 366.9 million (2024)
  - Expenditure: ₱ 145.6 million (2024)
  - Liabilities: ₱ 73.3 million (2024)

Service provider
  - Electricity: Biliran Electric Cooperative (BILECO)
- Time zone: UTC+8 (PST)
- ZIP code: 6550
- PSGC: 0807803000
- IDD : area code: +63 (0)53
- Native languages: Cebuano; Waray; Tagalog
- Website: www.cabucgayan-biliran.gov.ph

Cabucgayan (IPA: [kɐbʊk'gaɪɐn]), officially the Municipality of Cabucgayan (Waray: Bungto han Cabucgayan; Cebuano: Lungsod sa Cabucgayan; Tagalog: Bayan ng Cabucgayan), is a municipality in the province of Biliran, Philippines. According to the 2024 census, it has a population of 21,923 people. The town's populace predominantly speaks Waray.

== History ==
Cabucgayan derived its name from the snail called bukgay. In the Waray-Waray language, to make a singular noun into a plural noun, the article ka is added before the word and the article an after the word. Kabukgayan, therefore, means a place where there are many snails.

This municipality was created on September 29, 1949, when President Elpidio Quirino issued Executive Order no. 271.

== Geography ==
Cabucgayan is located at the south-eastern section of Biliran Island, and is approximately 19 kilometres (12 mi) south from Caibiran, 33 kilometres (21 mi) away from the provincial capital Naval, and 118 kilometres (73 mi) away from Tacloban, the provincial capital of Leyte. Cabucgayan is bound on the north by Caibiran, east by the Villareal Bay, south by Carigara Bay, and west by the municipality of Biliran

According to the Philippine Statistics Authority, the municipality has a land area of 54.19 square kilometres (20.92 sq mi) constituting 10.11% of the 536.01-square-kilometre- (206.95 sq mi) total area of Biliran.

=== Barangays ===
Cabucgayan is politically subdivided into 13 barangays. Each barangay consists of puroks and some have sitios.

PSGC	Barangay	Population			±% p.a.	
		2024		2010		
087803001	Balaquid	12.3%	2,688	2,499	▴	0.51%
087803002	Baso	7.1%	1,563	1,411	▴	0.71%
087803003	Bunga	18.4%	4,041	3,835	▴	0.36%
087803004	Caanibongan	1.2%	270	272	▾	−0.05%
087803005	Casiawan	5.8%	1,274	1,109	▴	0.97%
087803007	Esperanza (Poblacion)	4.9%	1,071	1,284	▾	−1.25%
087803008	Langgao	5.9%	1,299	1,164	▴	0.77%
087803009	Libertad	6.4%	1,402	1,332	▴	0.36%
087803010	Looc	12.6%	2,758	2,389	▴	1.00%
087803011	Magbangon (Poblacion)	7.3%	1,611	1,503	▴	0.48%
087803012	Pawikan	6.8%	1,480	1,471	▴	0.04%
087803013	Salawad	2.5%	546	542	▴	0.05%
087803014	Talibong	3.6%	785	810	▾	−0.22%
	Total		21,923	19,621	▴	0.77%

=== Climate ===
Climate data for Cabucgayan, Biliran
Month	Jan	Feb	Mar	Apr	May	Jun	Jul	Aug	Sep	Oct	Nov	Dec	Year
Mean daily maximum °C (°F)	28 (82)	29 (84)	30 (86)	31 (88)	31 (88)	30 (86)	30 (86)	30 (86)	30 (86)	29 (84)	29 (84)	29 (84)	30 (85)
Mean daily minimum °C (°F)	23 (73)	22 (72)	22 (72)	23 (73)	24 (75)	25 (77)	25 (77)	25 (77)	25 (77)	24 (75)	24 (75)	23 (73)	24 (75)
Average precipitation mm (inches)	73 (2.9)	56 (2.2)	75 (3.0)	71 (2.8)	114 (4.5)	174 (6.9)	172 (6.8)	163 (6.4)	167 (6.6)	161 (6.3)	158 (6.2)	125 (4.9)	1,509 (59.5)
Average rainy days	15.2	12.5	16.2	17.3	23.9	27.3	28.4	26.9	26.9	27.1	23.8	19.3	264.8
Source: Meteoblue

It belongs to the two types of climate, Type II and Type IV. It is characterized by pronounced rainfall periodically accompanied by trade winds and storms during the months of January, June, July, November and December while the minimum monthly rainfall occurs in February, March, April and May.

The total land area dedicated to agriculture is 2,905 hectares (7,180 acres) or 59.63% of the total land area. The three major forest products are timber, rattan and wild abaca.

== Demographics ==
Population census of Cabucgayan
Year	Pop.	±% p.a.
1903	2,183	—
1960	11,234	+2.92%
1970	10,847	−0.35%
1975	12,682	+3.18%
1980	13,034	+0.55%
1990	15,240	+1.58%
1995	16,498	+1.50%
2000	17,691	+1.51%
2007	18,799	+0.84%
2010	19,621	+1.57%
2015	20,788	+1.11%
2020	21,542	+0.75%
2024	21,923	+0.42%
Source: Philippine Statistics Authority

In the 2024 census, Cabucgayan had a population of 21,923 people. The population density was 400 inhabitants per square kilometre (1,000/sq mi).

== Economy ==
Poverty incidence of Cabucgayan (%)

Source: Philippine Statistics Authority
