= Port of Naval =

Location
- Country: Philippines
- Location: Naval, Biliran
- Coordinates: 11°33.6′N 124°23.5′E

Details
- Operated by: Philippine Ports Authority
- Type of harbour: Artificial
- Size: 8,642 square metres (0.8642 ha)
- No. of piers: 1

Statistics
- Vessel arrivals: ▼573 (2020)
- Annual cargo tonnage: ▲130,448 (2020)
- Passenger traffic: ▼24,424 (2020)
- Website www.ppa.com.ph

Port of Naval (Cebuano: Pantalan sa Naval) is a seaport located in Naval, Biliran. It is managed by the Philippine Ports Authority.

== Location ==
It is located in Naval, Biliran which is the capital town and trade center for the Biliran province.

== Statistics ==
| Year | Ship calls | Total cargo throughput (m.t.) | Total passengers |
|---|---|---|---|
| 2015 | 981 | 110,863 | 95,910 |
| 2016 | 921 | 101,369 | 82,607 |
| 2017 | 1,003 | 80,968 | 64,582 |
| 2018 | 991 | 114,906 | 80,478 |
| 2019 | 933 | 116,079 | 81,060 |
| 2020 | 573 | 130,448 | 24,424 |
