= Kawayan =

Municipality in Biliran, Philippines

- Municipality
- Municipality of Kawayan
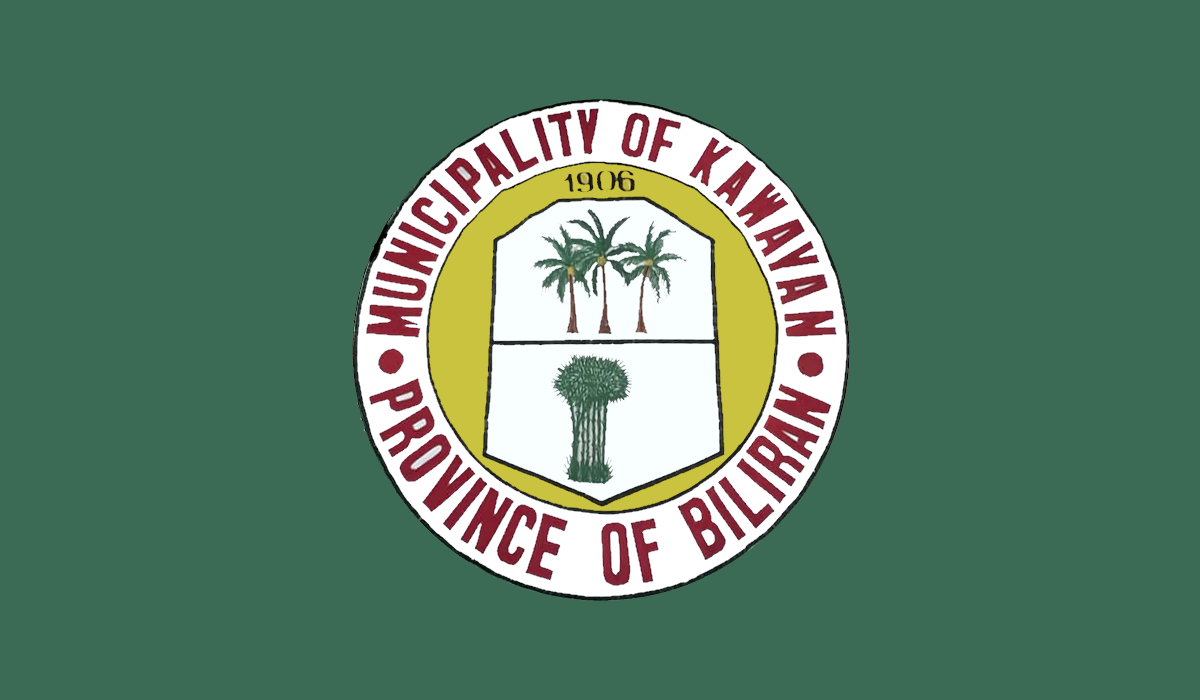
- Flag Seal

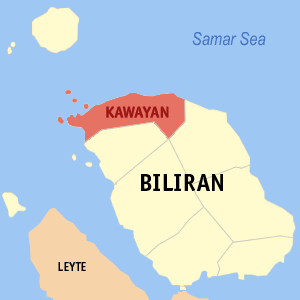
- Map of Biliran with Kawayan highlighted
- Interactive map of Kawayan
- Location within the Philippines
- Coordinates: 11°42′N 124°22′E
- Country: Philippines
- Region: Eastern Visayas
- Province: Biliran
- District: Lone district
- Barangays: 20 (see Barangays)

Government
  - Type: Sangguniang Bayan
  - Mayor: Manolo D. Rubi
  - Vice Mayor: Jake S. Espina
  - Representative: Gerardo J. Espina Jr.
  - Councilors: List: • Rodolfo J. Espina Sr.; • Absalon N. Lubaton; • Von Wendel L. Ampong; • Renito L. Villaflores; • Steve Chuckie C. Seno; • Jobwillard M. Victorioso; • Joselito P. Catigbe; • Maria Erica Rowin F. Catigbe
  - Electorate: 14,761 voters (2025)

Area
  - Total: 61.02 km^{2} (23.56 sq mi)
- Elevation: 90 m (300 ft)
- Highest elevation: 1,073 m (3,520 ft)
- Lowest elevation: 0 m (0 ft)

Population (2024 census)
  - Total: 21,422
  - Density: 351.1/km^{2} (909.3/sq mi)
  - Households: 5,027

Economy
  - Income class: 4th municipal income class
  - Poverty incidence: 13.29% (2023)
  - Revenue: ₱ 130.1 million (2022)
  - Assets: ₱ 328.8 million (2022)
  - Expenditure: ₱ 123.2 million (2022)
  - Liabilities: ₱ 72.94 million (2022)

Service provider
  - Electricity: Biliran Electric Cooperative (BILECO)
- Time zone: UTC+8 (PST)
- ZIP code: 6545
- PSGC: 0807806000
- IDD : area code: +63 (0)53
- Native languages: Waray; Cebuano; Tagalog
- Website: www.kawayan-biliran.gov.ph

Kawayan (IPA: [kaʊ'aɪɐn]), officially the Municipality of Kawayan (Waray: Bungto han Kawayan; Cebuano: Lungsod sa Kawayan; Tagalog: Bayan ng Kawayan), is a municipality in the province of Biliran, Philippines. According to the 2024 census, it has a population of 21,422 people.

== Geography ==
According to the Philippine Statistics Authority, the municipality has a land area of 61.02 square kilometres (23.56 sq mi) constituting 11.38% of the 536.01-square-kilometre- (206.95 sq mi) total area of Biliran.

=== Barangays ===
Kawayan is politically subdivided into 20 barangays. Each barangay consists of puroks and some have sitios.

In 1948, the barangays of Ungale, Tuo, and Inasuyan were transferred from Caibiran, Biliran. Kawayan, like the Municipality of Biliran, is a melting pot for Waray and Cebuano-speakers. The municipality is linguistically divided into two languages, the people of the western part of the town that faces Almeria at a distance speaks Cebuano while the eastern part that faces Maripipi and Culaba speaks Waray.

PSGC	Barangay	Population			±% p.a.	
		2024		2010		
087806001	Baganito	2.5%	536	550	▾	−0.18%
087806002	Balacson	4.1%	868	924	▾	−0.43%
087806003	Bilwang	3.1%	663	630	▴	0.36%
087806004	Bulalacao	3.9%	842	790	▴	0.44%
087806005	Burabod	2.9%	615	710	▾	−0.99%
087806006	Inasuyan	5.3%	1,129	1,114	▴	0.09%
087806007	Kansanok	3.2%	688	717	▾	−0.29%
087806008	Mada‑o	5.3%	1,132	1,044	▴	0.56%
087806009	Mapuyo	8.1%	1,731	1,815	▾	−0.33%
087806010	Masagaosao	3.7%	787	763	▴	0.22%
087806011	Masagongsong	2.5%	526	596	▾	−0.86%
087806012	Poblacion	5.6%	1,206	1,121	▴	0.51%
087806013	Tabunan North	0.8%	177	171	▴	0.24%
087806014	Tubig Guinoo	3.7%	785	739	▴	0.42%
087806015	Tucdao	8.9%	1,917	1,951	▾	−0.12%
087806016	Ungale	10.5%	2,240	2,264	▾	−0.07%
087806017	Balite	4.8%	1,019	1,008	▴	0.08%
087806018	Buyo	4.4%	937	884	▴	0.41%
087806019	Villa Cornejo (Looc)	5.3%	1,132	1,154	▾	−0.13%
087806020	San Lorenzo	6.4%	1,361	1,293	▴	0.36%
	Total		21,422	20,238	▴	0.40%

=== Climate ===
Climate data for Kawayan, Biliran
Month	Jan	Feb	Mar	Apr	May	Jun	Jul	Aug	Sep	Oct	Nov	Dec	Year
Mean daily maximum °C (°F)	28 (82)	28 (82)	29 (84)	30 (86)	31 (88)	30 (86)	29 (84)	29 (84)	29 (84)	29 (84)	29 (84)	28 (82)	29 (84)
Mean daily minimum °C (°F)	21 (70)	21 (70)	21 (70)	22 (72)	23 (73)	24 (75)	24 (75)	24 (75)	24 (75)	24 (75)	23 (73)	22 (72)	23 (73)
Average precipitation mm (inches)	72 (2.8)	52 (2.0)	65 (2.6)	62 (2.4)	87 (3.4)	129 (5.1)	153 (6.0)	124 (4.9)	147 (5.8)	157 (6.2)	139 (5.5)	117 (4.6)	1,304 (51.3)
Average rainy days	17.4	13.4	16.8	18.0	22.2	25.3	26.2	24.2	24.9	26.0	23.3	20.8	258.5
Source: Meteoblue

== Demographics ==
Population census of Kawayan
Year	Pop.	±% p.a.
1918	7,101	—
1939	8,498	+0.86%
1948	9,618	+1.39%
1960	12,252	+2.04%
1970	12,870	+0.49%
1975	14,568	+2.52%
1980	16,183	+2.12%
1990	15,056	−0.72%
1995	16,424	+1.64%
2000	17,507	+1.38%
2007	19,053	+1.17%
2010	20,238	+2.22%
2015	20,291	+0.05%
2020	20,455	+0.17%
2024	21,422	+1.12%
Source: Philippine Statistics Authority

In the 2024 census, Kawayan had a population of 21,422 people. The population density was 350 inhabitants per square kilometre (910/sq mi).

== Economy ==
Poverty incidence of Kawayan (%)

Source: Philippine Statistics Authority
