= Gerardo Espina Sr. =

Filipino politician

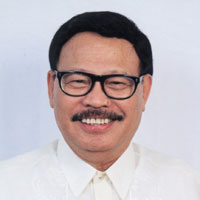
- Espina in the 12th Congress

Mayor of Naval, Biliran
- In office June 30, 2004 – June 30, 2007
- Preceded by: Gerardo Espina Jr.
- Succeeded by: Susan Velasquez Parilla

Member of the Philippine House of Representatives from Biliran's at-large congressional district
- In office June 30, 1995 – June 30, 2004
- Preceded by: Position established
- Succeeded by: Gerardo Espina Jr.

Member of the Interim Batasang Pambansa
- In office June 12, 1978 – June 5, 1984
- Constituency: Region IV

Personal details
- Born: May 24, 1935
- Died: February 6, 2013 (aged 77)
- Resting place: Loyola Memorial Park, Parañaque
- Party: NPC (1991–2013)
- Other political affiliations: KBL (until 1991); PPP (c. 1965)
- Occupation: Politician

Gerardo Sabinay Espina Sr. (May 24, 1935 – February 6, 2013) was a Filipino politician who served as a former representative for Biliran's at-large congressional district in the House of Representatives of the Philippines. He was also the patriarch of the Espina family.

== Political career ==
=== Marcos regime ===
In 1965, Espina unsuccessfully ran for representative of Manila's 3rd district under the Progressive Party of the Philippines. He was later a delegate of Manila to the Philippine Constitutional Convention of 1971. During the regime of President Ferdinand Marcos, he joined the cabinet as Deputy Minister of Trade & Industry, Minister of State for Labor, Administrator of the Export Processing Zone Authority, and member of the Presidential Special Committee on Government Reorganization. At the same time, he served in the Interim Batasang Pambansa as an Assemblyman for Region IV (Metro Manila) and concurrent Assistant Majority Leader from 1978 to 1984.

=== 1986 coup attempt; post-EDSA career ===
In July 1986, Espina took part in a coup attempt led by Arturo Tolentino at the Manila Hotel against the Corazon Aquino administration, being named Tolentino's "press secretary".

In 1988, he unsuccessfully ran for mayor of Manila. In 1992, Espina ran for senator in the 1992 Philippine Senate election, losing with 1,755,120 votes or 7.24 percent.

He was the first congressman for the newly established Biliran's at-large congressional district for three terms (1995–2004) under the Nationalist People's Coalition (NPC).

He was also the mayor of Naval, Biliran from 2004 to 2007.

== Death ==
Espina died from pneumonia on February 6, 2013 at the age of 77. He was buried in the Loyola Memorial Park in Parañaque.
