= Cauayan =

Cauayan can refer to the following places in the Philippines:

- Cauayan, a component city in the province of Isabela, Philippines
- Cauayan, a municipality in the province of Negros Occidental, Philippines

== See also ==
- Caoayan, a municipality in the province of Ilocos Sur, Philippines
- Kawayan, a municipality in the province of Biliran, Philippines
- Meycauayan, a component city in the province of Bulacan, Philippines
- Tagkawayan, a municipality in the province of Quezon, Philippines
