= Biliran, Biliran =

Municipality in Biliran, Philippines

Biliran
- Municipality
- Municipality of Biliran
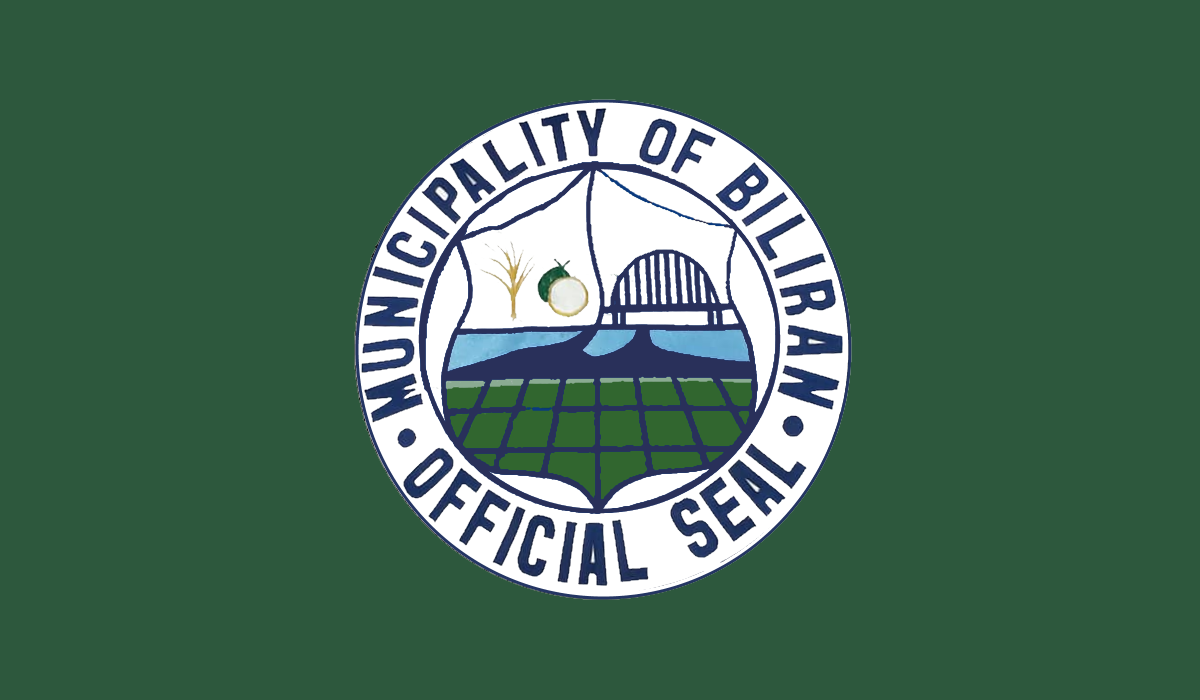
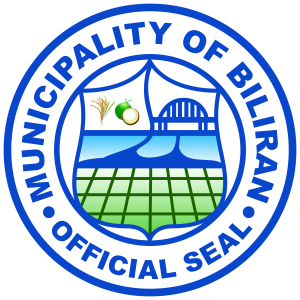
- Flag Seal

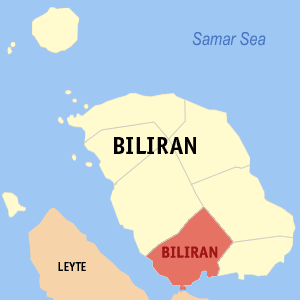
- Map of Biliran with Biliran highlighted
- Interactive map of Biliran
- Location within the Philippines
- Coordinates: 11°28′N 124°29′E
- Country: Philippines
- Region: Eastern Visayas
- Province: Biliran
- District: Lone district
- Founded: 1712
- Municipal Statuses: 1782-1904, 1908-1910, 1912–Present
- Barangays: 11 (see Barangays)

Government
  - Type: Sangguniang Bayan
  - Mayor: Grace J. Casil
  - Vice Mayor: Mario A. Nierras
  - Representative: Gerardo J. Espina Jr.
  - Councilors: List: • Neil Francis C. Peñaflor; • Jonas B. Jadulco; • Ma. Suzette S. Talaugon; • Ma. Esther Hope R. Trani; • Joel C. Dacillo; • Ernesto A. Gelizon; • Antonio I. Renola; • Carlos S. Chan; DILG Masterlist of Officials
  - Electorate: 13,858 voters (2025)

Area
  - Total: 70.30 km^{2} (27.14 sq mi)
- Elevation: 78 m (256 ft)
- Highest elevation: 859 m (2,818 ft)
- Lowest elevation: 0 m (0 ft)

Population (2024 census)
  - Total: 18,721
  - Density: 266.3/km^{2} (689.7/sq mi)
  - Households: 4,358

Economy
  - Income class: 4th municipal income class
  - Poverty incidence: 13.5% (2023)
  - Revenue: ₱ 114 million (2024)
  - Assets: ₱ 422.2 million (2024)
  - Expenditure: ₱ 118.1 million (2024)
  - Liabilities: ₱ 108 million (2024)

Service provider
  - Electricity: Biliran Electric Cooperative (BILECO)
- Time zone: UTC+8 (PST)
- ZIP code: 6549
- PSGC: 0807802000
- IDD : area code: +63 (0)53
- Native languages: Cebuano; Waray; Tagalog
- Website: www.biliranmunicipality.gov.ph

Biliran (IPA: [bɪ'lirɐn]), officially the Municipality of Biliran (Waray: Bungto han Biliran; Cebuano: Lungsod sa Biliran; Tagalog: Bayan ng Biliran), is a municipality in the province of Biliran, Philippines. According to the 2024 census, it has a population of 18,721 people. The town's populace predominantly speaks Waray.

== Geography ==
Biliran serves as the gateway to Biliran Province. It is situated in the southern part of the province connecting Biliran Island to Leyte via Biliran Bridge. The government is planning to add another bridge parallel to the old bridge for better connectivity.

According to the Philippine Statistics Authority, the municipality has a land area of 70.30 square kilometres (27.14 sq mi) constituting 13.12% of the 536.01-square-kilometre- (206.95 sq mi) total area of Biliran.

=== Barangays ===
Biliran is politically subdivided into 11 barangays. Each barangay consists of puroks and some have sitios.

PSGC	Barangay	Population			±% p.a.	
		2024		2010		
087802001	Bato	9.1%	1,705	1,320	▴	1.79%
087802002	Burabod	10.5%	1,963	1,859	▴	0.38%
087802003	Busali	7.7%	1,450	1,684	▾	−1.03%
087802004	Hugpa	4.9%	913	892	▴	0.16%
087802005	Julita	9.9%	1,860	1,911	▾	−0.19%
087802006	Canila	4.7%	875	799	▴	0.63%
087802007	Pinangumhan	4.6%	852	739	▴	0.99%
087802008	San Isidro (Poblacion)	15.6%	2,926	2,841	▴	0.20%
087802009	San Roque (Poblacion)	12.8%	2,396	2,306	▴	0.27%
087802010	Sanggalang	6.1%	1,136	1,039	▴	0.62%
087802011	Villa Enage (Baras)	4.3%	806	793	▴	0.11%
	Total		18,721	16,183	▴	1.02%

=== Climate ===
Climate data for Biliran, Biliran
Month	Jan	Feb	Mar	Apr	May	Jun	Jul	Aug	Sep	Oct	Nov	Dec	Year
Mean daily maximum °C (°F)	28 (82)	29 (84)	29 (84)	31 (88)	31 (88)	30 (86)	30 (86)	30 (86)	30 (86)	29 (84)	29 (84)	29 (84)	30 (85)
Mean daily minimum °C (°F)	22 (72)	22 (72)	22 (72)	23 (73)	24 (75)	25 (77)	25 (77)	25 (77)	25 (77)	24 (75)	24 (75)	23 (73)	24 (75)
Average precipitation mm (inches)	73 (2.9)	56 (2.2)	75 (3.0)	71 (2.8)	114 (4.5)	174 (6.9)	172 (6.8)	163 (6.4)	167 (6.6)	161 (6.3)	158 (6.2)	125 (4.9)	1,509 (59.5)
Average rainy days	15.2	12.5	16.2	17.3	23.9	27.3	28.4	26.9	26.9	27.1	23.8	19.3	264.8
Source: Meteoblue

== Demographics ==
Population census of Biliran
Year	Pop.	±% p.a.
1903	2,362	—
1918	5,373	+5.63%
1939	9,218	+2.60%
1948	11,469	+2.46%
1960	8,138	−2.82%
1970	8,841	+0.83%
1975	9,801	+2.09%
1980	10,989	+2.31%
1990	11,531	+0.48%
1995	13,775	+3.39%
2000	13,817	+0.07%
2007	14,947	+1.09%
2010	16,183	+2.93%
2015	16,882	+0.81%
2020	17,662	+0.96%
2024	18,721	+1.41%
Source: Philippine Statistics Authority

In the 2024 census, Biliran had a population of 18,721 people. The population density was 270 inhabitants per square kilometre (700/sq mi).

== Economy ==
Poverty incidence of Biliran (%)

Source: Philippine Statistics Authority

== Transportation ==
=== Biliran Bridge ===
Built during the presidency of Marcos, the Biliran Bridge is the only land access to the island of Leyte and throughout the island province. Completed around 1975, This bridge is approximately 150 meters long and its main span is kept in location by an arched steel structure that hovers above a brief and narrow water channel measuring at about 40 meters broad low tide.
