= Maripipi =

Municipality in Biliran, Philippines

- Municipality
- Municipality of Maripipi
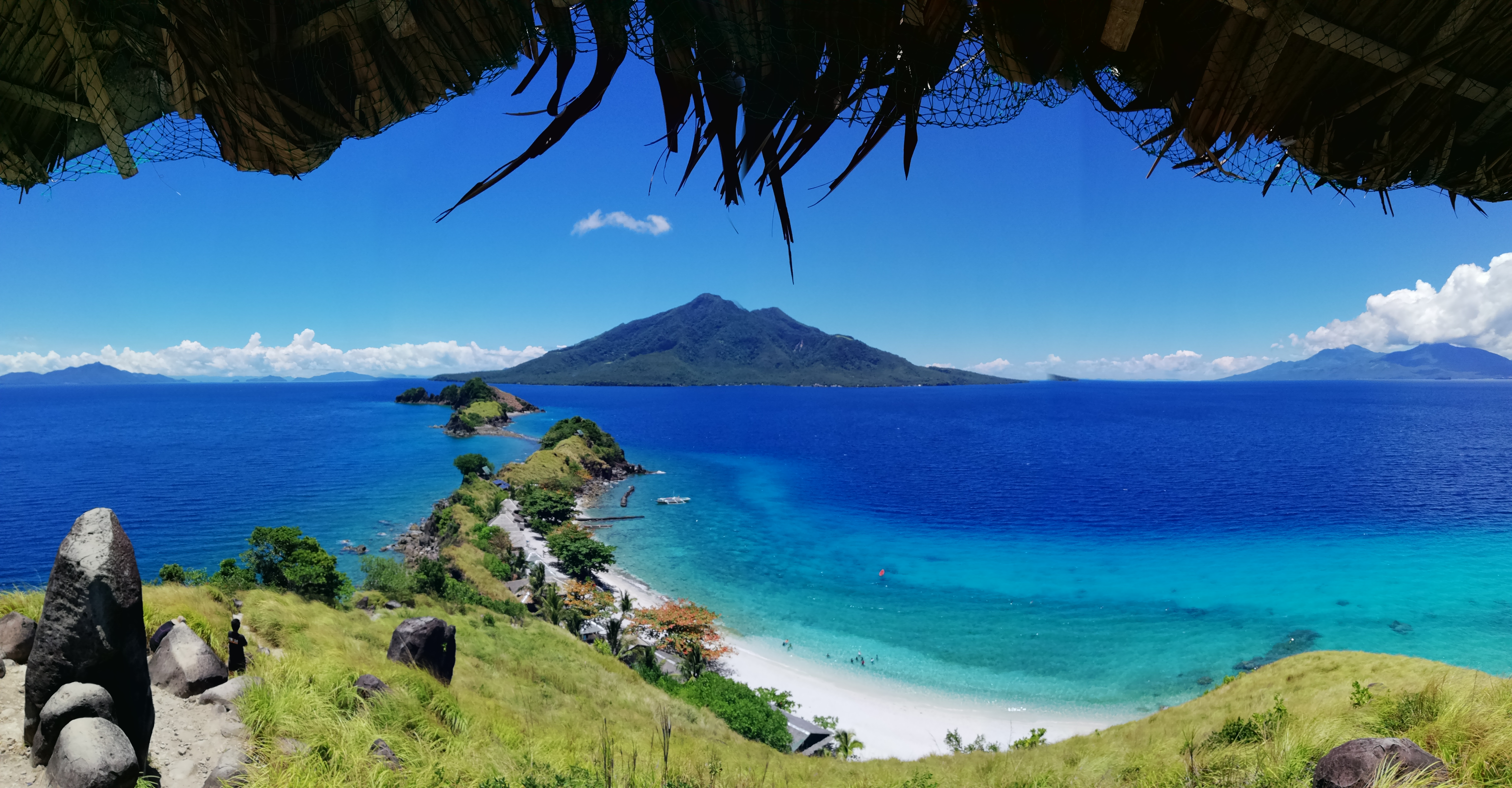
- Maripipi Island as seen from Sambawan Island

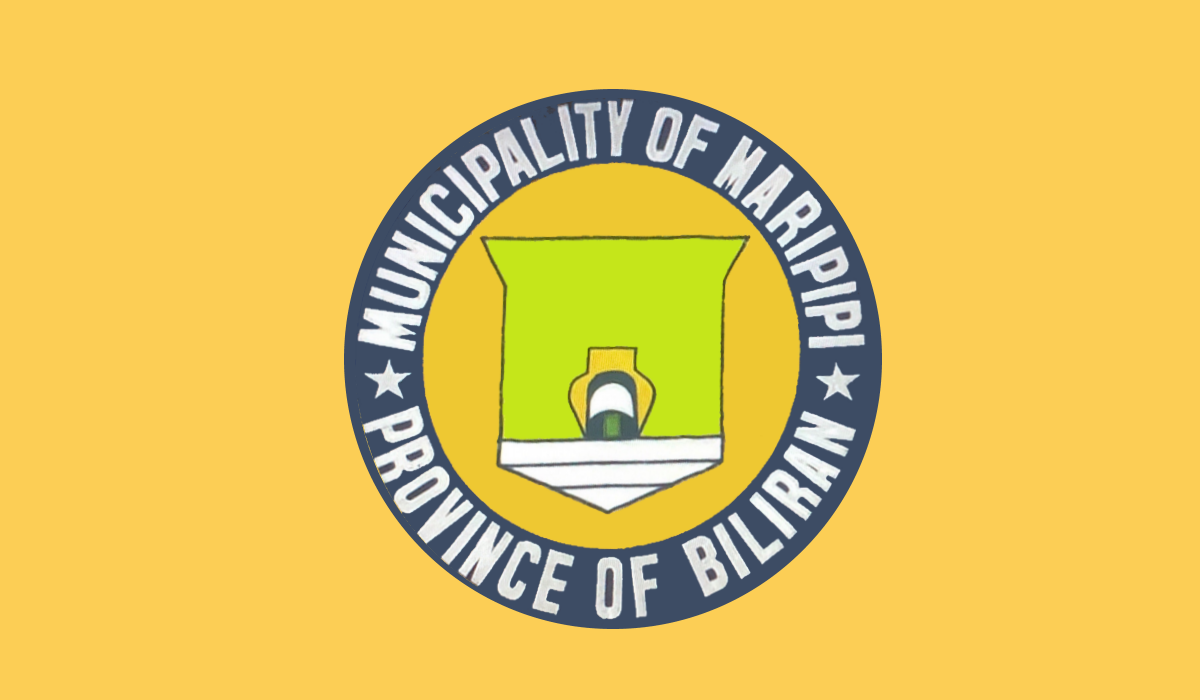
- Flag

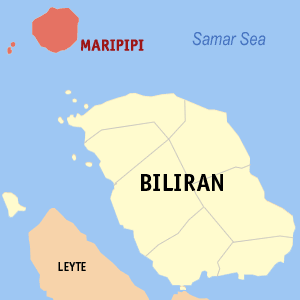
- Map of Biliran with Maripipi highlighted
- Interactive map of Maripipi
- Location within the Philippines
- Coordinates: 11°46′34″N 124°20′53″E
- Country: Philippines
- Region: Eastern Visayas
- Province: Biliran
- District: Lone district
- Barangays: 15 (see Barangays)

Government
  - Type: Sangguniang Bayan
  - Mayor: Joseph C. Caingcoy
  - Vice Mayor: Felisa S. Mulles
  - Representative: Gerardo J. Espina Jr.
  - Councilors: List: • Wilma P. Salas; • Larry R. Llever; • Mervin L. Macorol; • Fe Monina M. Marasigan; • Juan C. Asugas; • Dirk M. Jaro; • Neysa Erin S. Macorol; • Felizardo A. Salonoy; DILG Masterlist of Officials
  - Electorate: 5,150 voters (2025)

Area
  - Total: 27.83 km^{2} (10.75 sq mi)
- Highest elevation (Mount Maripipi): 924 m (3,031 ft)
- Lowest elevation: 0 m (0 ft)

Population (2024 census)
  - Total: 6,070
  - Density: 218/km^{2} (565/sq mi)
  - Households: 1,641

Economy
  - Income class: 5th municipal income class
  - Poverty incidence: 15.44% (2023)
  - Revenue: ₱ 162.3 million (2024)
  - Assets: ₱ 343 million (2024)
  - Expenditure: ₱ 75.77 million (2024)
  - Liabilities: ₱ 57.17 million (2024)

Service provider
  - Electricity: Biliran Electric Cooperative (BILECO)
- Time zone: UTC+8 (PST)
- ZIP code: 6546
- PSGC: 0807807000
- IDD : area code: +63 (0)53
- Native languages: Waray; Cebuano; Tagalog
- Website: www.maripipi-biliran.gov.ph

Maripipi, officially the Municipality of Maripipi (Waray: Bungto san Maripipi; Cebuano: Lungsod sa Maripipi; Tagalog: Bayan ng Maripipi), is a municipality in the province of Biliran, Philippines. According to the 2024 census, it has a population of 6,070 people, making it the least populated town in the province. The town's populace predominantly speak Waray language.

== Geography ==
Maripipi Municipality is composed of Maripipi Island and surrounding islets situated northwest off the coast of Biliran Island.

According to the Philippine Statistics Authority, the municipality has a land area of 27.83 square kilometres (10.75 sq mi) constituting 5.19% of the 536.01-square-kilometre- (206.95 sq mi) total area of Biliran.

Mount Maripipi is the highest point in the island with an elevation of 3,031 ft (924 m) above sea level.

=== Barangays ===
Maripipi is politically subdivided into 15 barangays. Each barangay consists of puroks and some have sitios.

PSGC	Barangay	Population			±% p.a.	
		2024		2010		
087807001	Agutay	8.6%	523	511	▴	0.16%
087807002	Banlas	3.9%	235	249	▾	−0.40%
087807003	Bato	9.5%	576	507	▴	0.89%
087807004	Binalayan West	8.4%	509	477	▴	0.45%
087807005	Binalayan East	7.9%	479	476	▴	0.04%
087807008	Burabod	3.7%	222	212	▴	0.32%
087807009	Calbani	6.3%	381	404	▾	−0.41%
087807010	Canduhao	5.9%	356	329	▴	0.55%
087807011	Casibang	7.1%	431	379	▴	0.90%
087807012	Danao	5.0%	306	345	▾	−0.83%
087807014	Ol‑og	6.0%	362	327	▴	0.71%
087807015	Binongto‑an (Poblacion Norte)	10.8%	653	578	▴	0.85%
087807016	Ermita (Poblacion Sur)	16.3%	988	831	▴	1.21%
087807017	Trabugan	2.9%	177	185	▾	−0.31%
087807018	Viga	15.8%	961	889	▴	0.54%
	Total		6,070	6,699	▾	−0.68%

=== Climate ===
Climate data for Maripipi, Biliran
Month	Jan	Feb	Mar	Apr	May	Jun	Jul	Aug	Sep	Oct	Nov	Dec	Year
Mean daily maximum °C (°F)	28 (82)	29 (84)	29 (84)	31 (88)	31 (88)	30 (86)	29 (84)	29 (84)	29 (84)	29 (84)	29 (84)	28 (82)	29 (85)
Mean daily minimum °C (°F)	21 (70)	21 (70)	21 (70)	22 (72)	23 (73)	24 (75)	24 (75)	25 (77)	24 (75)	24 (75)	23 (73)	22 (72)	23 (73)
Average precipitation mm (inches)	72 (2.8)	52 (2.0)	65 (2.6)	62 (2.4)	87 (3.4)	129 (5.1)	153 (6.0)	124 (4.9)	147 (5.8)	157 (6.2)	139 (5.5)	117 (4.6)	1,304 (51.3)
Average rainy days	17.4	13.4	16.8	18.0	22.2	25.3	26.2	24.2	24.9	26.0	23.3	20.8	258.5
Source: Meteoblue

== Demographics ==
Population census of Maripipi
Year	Pop.	±% p.a.
1903	1,956	—
1918	3,463	+3.88%
1939	5,433	+2.17%
1948	6,550	+2.10%
1960	7,155	+0.74%
1970	6,978	−0.25%
1975	7,949	+2.65%
1980	7,379	−1.48%
1990	6,943	−0.61%
1995	7,853	+2.33%
2000	8,319	+1.24%
2007	6,946	−2.46%
2010	6,699	−1.31%
2015	7,159	+1.27%
2020	6,373	−2.42%
2024	6,070	−1.16%
Source: Philippine Statistics Authority

In the 2024 census, Maripipi had a population of 6,070 people. The population density was 220 inhabitants per square kilometre (570/sq mi).

== Economy ==
Poverty incidence of Maripipi (%)

Source: Philippine Statistics Authority
