= Culaba =

Municipality in Biliran, Philippines

- Municipality
- Municipality of Culaba
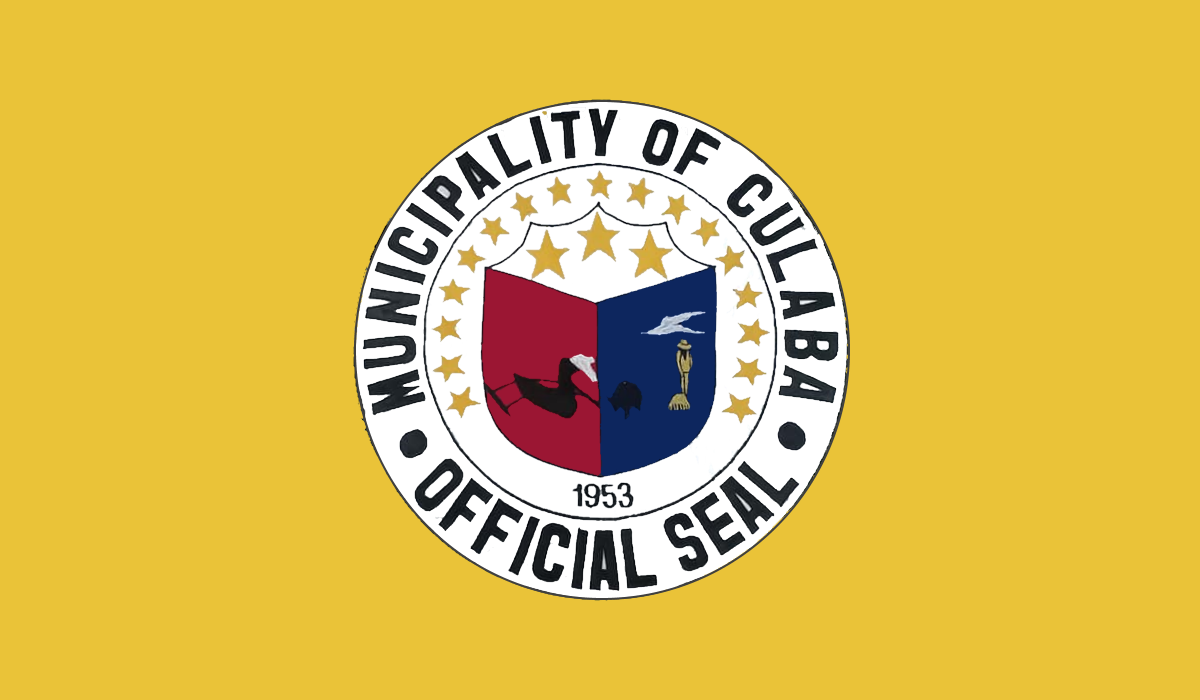
- Flag

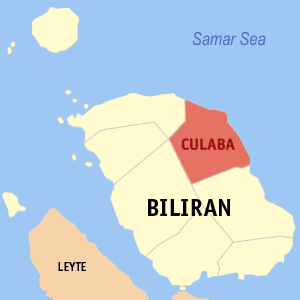
- Map of Biliran with Culaba highlighted
- Interactive map of Culaba
- Location within the Philippines
- Coordinates: 11°39′28″N 124°32′33″E
- Country: Philippines
- Region: Eastern Visayas
- Province: Biliran
- District: Lone district
- Founded: 16 October 1953
- Barangays: 17 (see Barangays)

Government
  - Type: Sangguniang Bayan
  - Mayor: Humphrey B. Olimba
  - Vice Mayor: Enrico B. Uyvico
  - Representative: Gerardo J. Espina Jr.
  - Councilors: List: • Leslie Ann G. Uyvico; • Jose C. Dayoha Jr.; • Olivia D. Yu; • Loreto D. Serdeña III; • Myra G. Ortega; • Epifanio M. Punay Jr.; • Rhodora E. Amoroto; • Vic-Jay C. Gonzal; DILG Masterlist of Officials
  - Electorate: 10,946 voters (2025)

Area
  - Total: 73.42 km^{2} (28.35 sq mi)
- Elevation: 148 m (486 ft)
- Highest elevation: 1,245 m (4,085 ft)
- Lowest elevation: 0 m (0 ft)

Population (2024 census)
  - Total: 13,563
  - Density: 184.7/km^{2} (478.5/sq mi)
  - Households: 3,109

Economy
  - Income class: 4th municipal income class
  - Poverty incidence: 17.08% (2023)
  - Revenue: ₱ 103.7 million (2024)
  - Assets: ₱ 301 million (2024)
  - Expenditure: ₱ 105.4 million (2024)
  - Liabilities: ₱ 54.68 million (2024)

Service provider
  - Electricity: Biliran Electric Cooperative (BILECO)
- Time zone: UTC+8 (PST)
- ZIP code: 6547
- PSGC: 0807805000
- IDD : area code: +63 (0)53
- Native languages: Waray; Cebuano; Tagalog
- Website: www.culaba-biliran.gov.ph

Culaba (IPA: [kʊ'labɐʔ]), officially the Municipality of Culaba (Waray: Bungto han Culaba; Cebuano: Lungsod sa Culaba; Tagalog: Bayan ng Culaba), is a municipality in the province of Biliran, Philippines. According to the 2024 census, it has a population of 13,563 people.The town's populace predominantly speak Waray language.

== Geography ==
According to the Philippine Statistics Authority, the municipality has a land area of 73.42 square kilometres (28.35 sq mi) constituting 13.70% of the 536.01-square-kilometre- (206.95 sq mi) total area of Biliran.

=== Barangays ===
Culaba is politically subdivided into 17 barangays. Each barangay consists of puroks and some have sitios.

PSGC	Barangay	Population			±% p.a.	
		2024		2010		
087805001	Acaban	4.5%	615	635	▾	−0.22%
087805002	Bacolod	2.4%	331	292	▴	0.88%
087805003	Binongtoan	6.1%	827	821	▴	0.05%
087805004	Bool Central (Poblacion)	3.6%	494	605	▾	−1.40%
087805005	Bool East (Poblacion)	7.5%	1,012	970	▴	0.30%
087805006	Bool West (Poblacion)	5.5%	745	764	▾	−0.17%
087805007	Calipayan	4.2%	569	578	▾	−0.11%
087805008	Guindapunan	3.2%	440	429	▴	0.18%
087805009	Habuhab	2.4%	329	282	▴	1.08%
087805010	Looc	6.4%	862	829	▴	0.27%
087805011	Marvel (Poblacion)	12.7%	1,720	1,634	▴	0.36%
087805012	Patag	3.7%	496	481	▴	0.21%
087805013	Pinamihagan	6.1%	828	905	▾	−0.62%
087805014	Culaba Central (Poblacion)	4.6%	625	683	▾	−0.61%
087805015	Salvacion	2.4%	321	328	▾	−0.15%
087805016	San Roque	3.8%	509	477	▴	0.45%
087805017	Virginia (Poblacion)	11.8%	1,602	1,539	▴	0.28%
	Total		13,563	12,252	▴	0.71%

=== Climate ===
Climate data for Culaba, Biliran
Month	Jan	Feb	Mar	Apr	May	Jun	Jul	Aug	Sep	Oct	Nov	Dec	Year
Mean daily maximum °C (°F)	28 (82)	29 (84)	29 (84)	31 (88)	31 (88)	30 (86)	30 (86)	30 (86)	30 (86)	29 (84)	29 (84)	29 (84)	30 (85)
Mean daily minimum °C (°F)	22 (72)	22 (72)	22 (72)	23 (73)	24 (75)	25 (77)	25 (77)	25 (77)	25 (77)	24 (75)	24 (75)	23 (73)	24 (75)
Average precipitation mm (inches)	73 (2.9)	56 (2.2)	75 (3.0)	71 (2.8)	114 (4.5)	174 (6.9)	172 (6.8)	163 (6.4)	167 (6.6)	161 (6.3)	158 (6.2)	125 (4.9)	1,509 (59.5)
Average rainy days	15.2	12.5	16.2	17.3	23.9	27.3	28.4	26.9	26.9	27.1	23.8	19.3	264.8
Source: Meteoblue (modeled/calculated data, not measured locally)

== Demographics ==
Population census of Culaba
Year	Pop.	±% p.a.
1903	2,112	—
1960	8,866	+2.55%
1970	8,930	+0.07%
1975	10,133	+2.57%
1980	9,924	−0.42%
1990	9,822	−0.10%
1995	12,703	+4.94%
2000	11,506	−2.10%
2007	10,962	−0.67%
2010	12,252	+4.13%
2015	12,325	+0.11%
2020	12,972	+1.08%
2024	13,563	+1.08%
Source: Philippine Statistics Authority

In the 2024 census, Culaba had a population of 13,563 people. The population density was 180 inhabitants per square kilometre (470/sq mi).

== Economy ==
Poverty incidence of Culaba (%)

Source: Philippine Statistics Authority

== Education ==
=== Secondary schools ===
- Culaba National Vocational School
- Bool National High School
- Pinamihagan Integrated High School

=== Elementary schools ===
- Acaban Elementary School
- Bacolod Elementary School
- Binongtoan Elementary School
- Bool Elementary School
- Culaba Central School
- Calipayan Elementary School
- Habuhab Elementary School
- Looc Elementary School
- Patag Elementary School
- Pinamihagan Elementary School
- Salvation Elementary School
- San Roque Elementary School

== Healthcare ==
- Culaba Community Hospital
- Bool Health Center
- Bacolod Health Center
- Pinamihagan Health Center
