= Caibiran =

Municipality in Biliran, Philippines

- Municipality
- Municipality of Caibiran
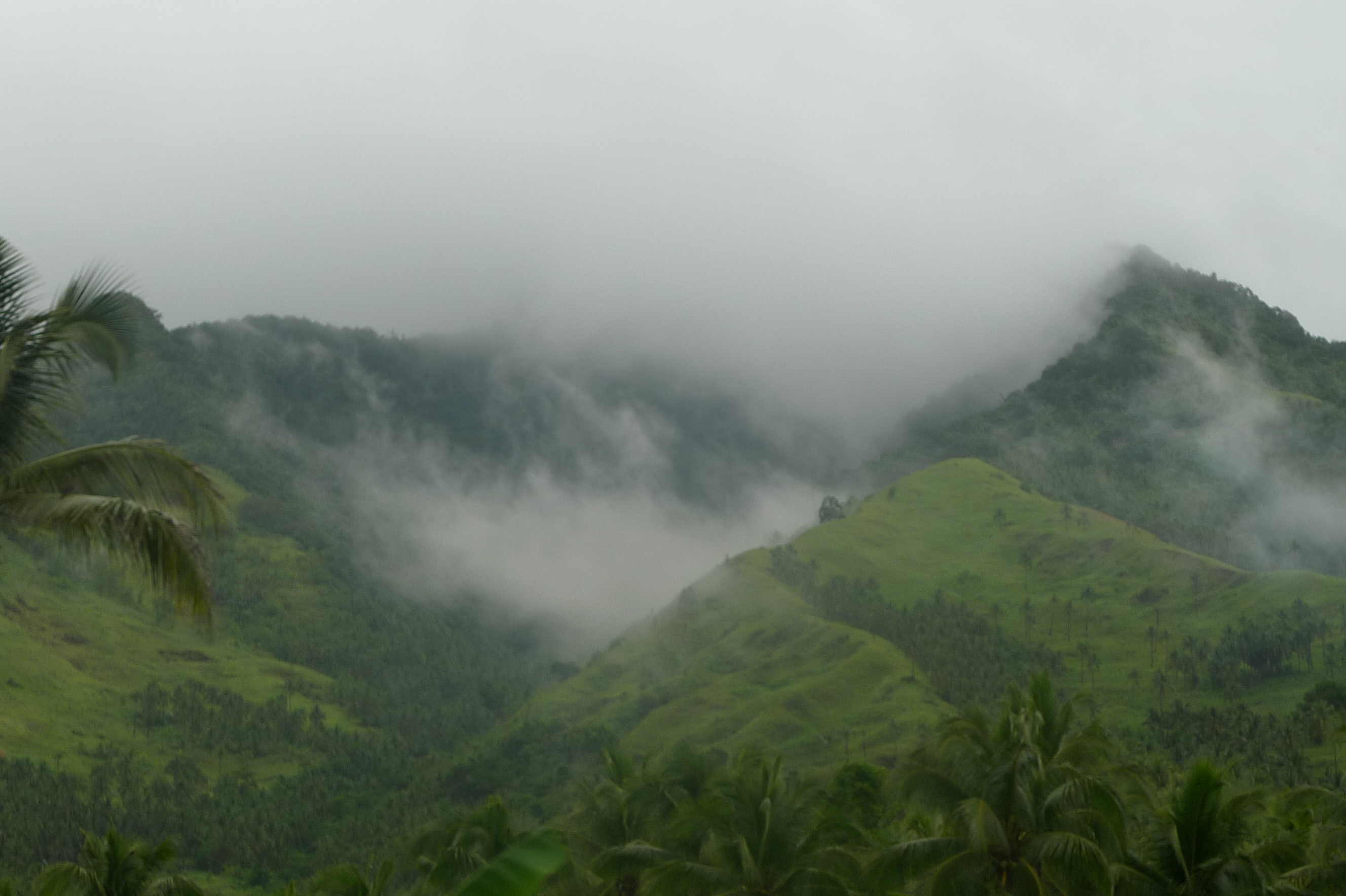
- Mountains of Caibiran

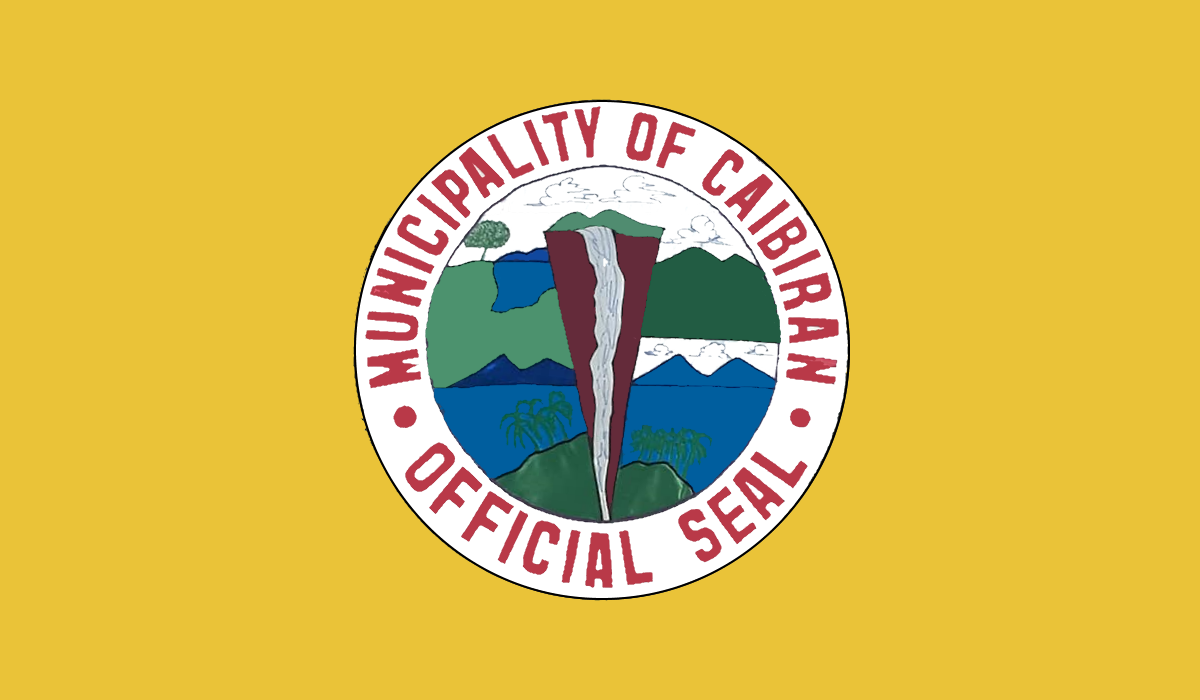
- Flag

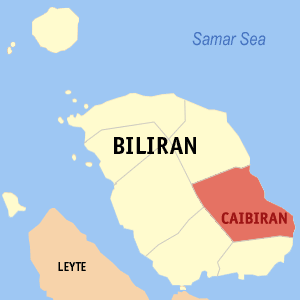
- Map of Biliran with Caibiran highlighted
- Interactive map of Caibiran
- Location within the Philippines
- Coordinates: 11°34′N 124°35′E
- Country: Philippines
- Region: Eastern Visayas
- Province: Biliran
- District: Lone district
- Barangays: 17 (see Barangays)

Government
  - Type: Sangguniang Bayan
  - Mayor: Rhodessa D. Revita
  - Vice Mayor: Linda V. Baleyos
  - Representative: Gerardo J. Espina Jr.
  - Councilors: List: • Emmanuel R. Colantro; • Reynaldo R. Gervacio; • Jay B. Yu; • Reynaldo T. Pacad; • Antonio L. Masalihit; • Marlou R. Villasin; • Rommel R. Berdal; • Marilyn C. Joboco; DILG Masterlist of Officials
  - Electorate: 16,966 voters (2025)

Area
  - Total: 83.55 km^{2} (32.26 sq mi)
- Elevation: 139 m (456 ft)
- Highest elevation: 1,294 m (4,245 ft)
- Lowest elevation: 0 m (0 ft)

Population (2024 census)
  - Total: 24,444
  - Density: 292.6/km^{2} (757.7/sq mi)
  - Households: 5,438

Economy
  - Income class: 4th municipal income class
  - Poverty incidence: 20.98% (2023)
  - Revenue: ₱ 168.9 million (2024)
  - Assets: ₱ 364.5 million (2024)
  - Expenditure: ₱ 161.4 million (2024)
  - Liabilities: ₱ 24.27 million (2024)

Service provider
  - Electricity: Biliran Electric Cooperative (BILECO)
- Time zone: UTC+8 (PST)
- ZIP code: 6548
- PSGC: 0807804000
- IDD : area code: +63 (0)53
- Native languages: Cebuano; Waray; Tagalog
- Website: www.caibiran-biliran.gov.ph

Caibiran (IPA: [kɐʔɪbɪ'ɾan]), officially the Municipality of Caibiran (Waray: Bungto han Caibiran; Cebuano: Lungsod sa Caibiran; Tagalog: Bayan ng Caibiran), is a municipality in the province of Biliran, Philippines. According to the 2024 census, it has a population of 24,444 people. The town's populace predominantly speak Waray language.

== Geography ==
According to the Philippine Statistics Authority, the municipality has a land area of 83.55 square kilometres (32.26 sq mi) constituting 15.59% of the 536.01-square-kilometre- (206.95 sq mi) total area of Biliran.

=== Barangays ===
Caibiran is politically subdivided into 17 barangays. Each barangay consists of puroks and some have sitios.

In 1948, the barangays of Ungale, Tuo, and Inasuyan were transferred to Kawayan, Biliran.

PSGC	Barangay	Population			±% p.a.	
		2024		2010		
087804001	Alegria	3.2%	784	743	▴	0.37%
087804002	Asug	2.3%	558	543	▴	0.19%
087804003	Bari‑is	5.1%	1,257	1,212	▴	0.25%
087804004	Binohangan	4.3%	1,044	1,059	▾	−0.10%
087804005	Cabibihan	7.0%	1,710	1,405	▴	1.38%
087804006	Kawayanon	1.8%	430	525	▾	−1.38%
087804007	Looc	2.9%	703	732	▾	−0.28%
087804009	Manlabang	8.4%	2,055	1,708	▴	1.29%
087804010	Caulangohan (Marevil)	2.3%	554	507	▴	0.62%
087804011	Maurang	7.7%	1,878	1,683	▴	0.77%
087804012	Palanay (Poblacion)	4.5%	1,089	1,138	▾	−0.31%
087804013	Palengke (Poblacion)	5.6%	1,357	1,601	▾	−1.14%
087804014	Tomalistis	3.9%	946	916	▴	0.22%
087804015	Union	4.6%	1,116	1,026	▴	0.59%
087804016	Uson	8.2%	2,013	1,888	▴	0.45%
087804017	Victory (Poblacion)	16.8%	4,102	4,013	▴	0.15%
087804018	Villa Vicenta (Mainit)	3.8%	928	774	▴	1.27%
	Total		24,444	21,473	▴	0.91%

=== Climate ===
Climate data for Caibiran, Biliran
Month	Jan	Feb	Mar	Apr	May	Jun	Jul	Aug	Sep	Oct	Nov	Dec	Year
Mean daily maximum °C (°F)	28 (82)	29 (84)	29 (84)	31 (88)	31 (88)	30 (86)	30 (86)	30 (86)	30 (86)	29 (84)	29 (84)	29 (84)	30 (85)
Mean daily minimum °C (°F)	22 (72)	22 (72)	22 (72)	23 (73)	24 (75)	25 (77)	25 (77)	25 (77)	25 (77)	24 (75)	24 (75)	23 (73)	24 (75)
Average precipitation mm (inches)	73 (2.9)	56 (2.2)	75 (3.0)	71 (2.8)	114 (4.5)	174 (6.9)	172 (6.8)	163 (6.4)	167 (6.6)	161 (6.3)	158 (6.2)	125 (4.9)	1,509 (59.5)
Average rainy days	15.2	12.5	16.2	17.3	23.9	27.3	28.4	26.9	26.9	27.1	23.8	19.3	264.8
Source: Meteoblue (Use with caution: this is modeled/calculated data, not measured locally.)

== Demographics ==
Population census of Caibiran
Year	Pop.	±% p.a.
1903	4,091	—
1918	12,767	+7.88%
1939	19,522	+2.04%
1948	21,511	+1.08%
1960	16,963	−1.96%
1970	14,221	−1.75%
1975	16,400	+2.90%
1980	17,004	+0.73%
1990	17,596	+0.34%
1995	18,582	+1.03%
2000	19,606	+1.16%
2007	20,616	+0.70%
2010	21,473	+1.49%
2015	22,524	+0.91%
2020	24,167	+1.49%
2024	24,444	+0.27%
Source: Philippine Statistics Authority

In the 2024 census, Caibiran had a population of 24,444 people. The population density was 290 inhabitants per square kilometre (750/sq mi).

== Economy ==
Poverty incidence of Caibiran (%)

Source: Philippine Statistics Authority
