= Almeria, Biliran =

Municipality in Biliran, Philippines

Almeria
- Municipality
- Municipality of Almeria
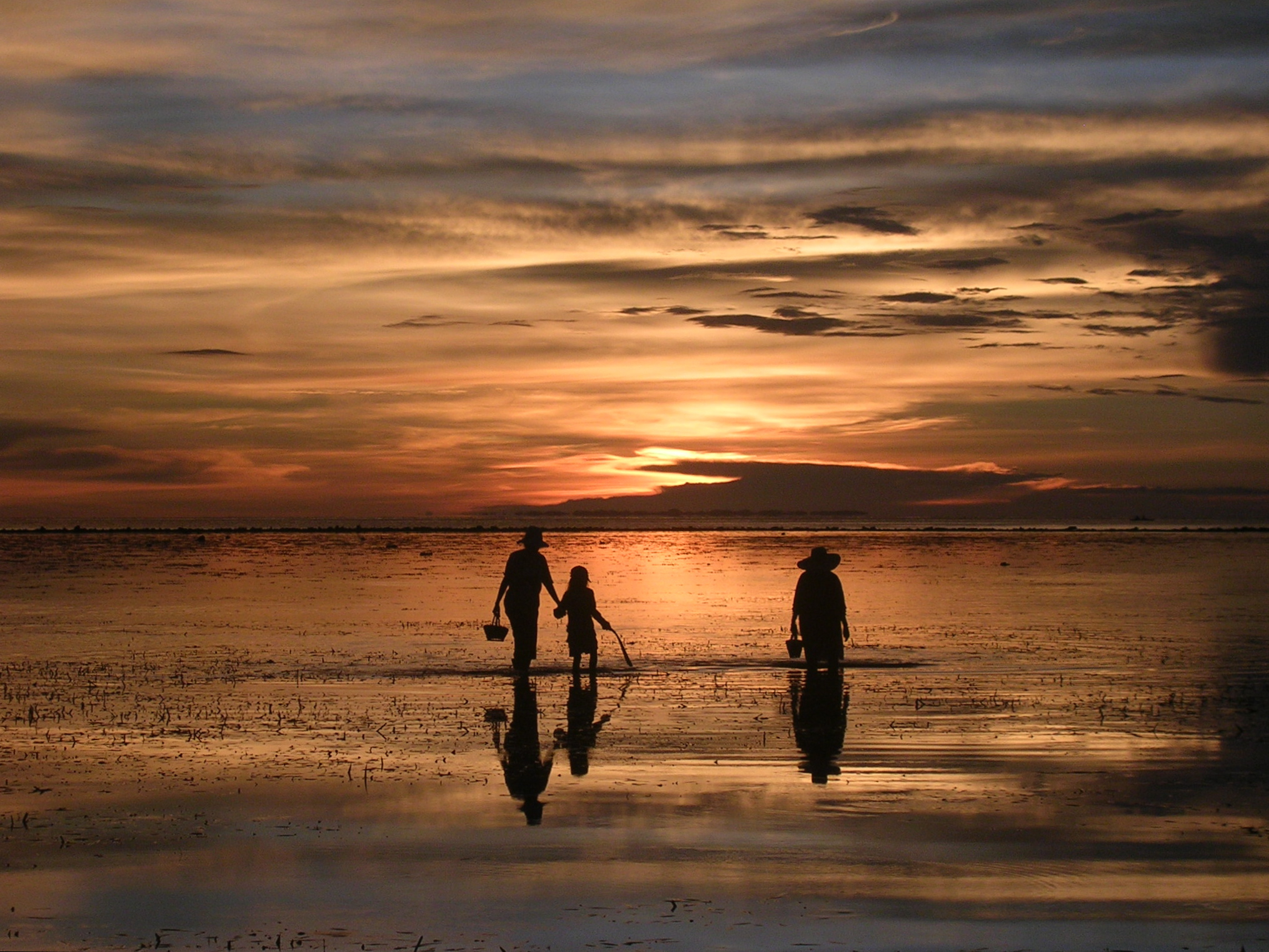
- Sunset at the Agta Beach Resort

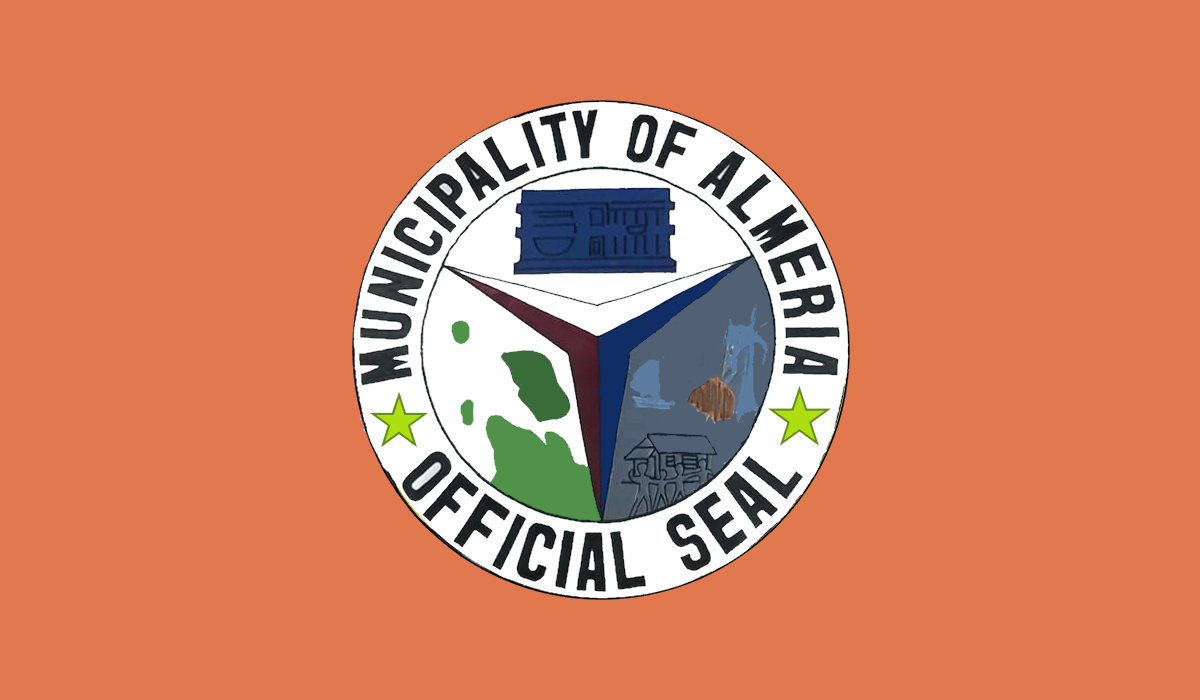
- Flag

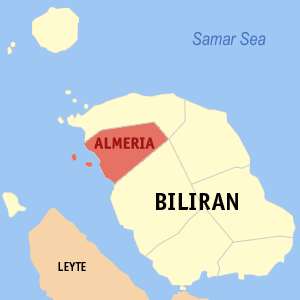
- Map of Biliran with Almeria highlighted
- Interactive map of Almeria
- Location within the Philippines
- Coordinates: 11°37′14″N 124°22′46″E
- Country: Philippines
- Region: Eastern Visayas
- Province: Biliran
- District: Lone district
- Barangays: 13 (see Barangays)

Government
  - Type: Sangguniang Bayan
  - Mayor: Richard C. Jaguros
  - Vice Mayor: Marygie E. Tacoy
  - Representative: Gerardo J. Espina Jr.
  - Councilors: List: • Mary B. Sale; • Noel P. Salloman; • Aladino L. Sale; • Henry O. Quijano; • Ronilo C. Barrina; • Jovito S. de la Peña; • Florante C. Agajan; • Lino B. Caparro; DILG Masterlist of Officials
  - Electorate: 12,838 voters (2025)

Area
  - Total: 57.46 km^{2} (22.19 sq mi)
- Elevation: 116 m (381 ft)
- Highest elevation: 995 m (3,264 ft)
- Lowest elevation: 0 m (0 ft)

Population (2024 census)
  - Total: 18,716
  - Density: 325.7/km^{2} (843.6/sq mi)
  - Households: 4,519

Economy
  - Income class: 4th municipal income class
  - Poverty incidence: 10.34% (2023)
  - Revenue: ₱ 112.7 million (2024)
  - Assets: ₱ 290 million (2024)
  - Expenditure: ₱ 147.4 million (2024)
  - Liabilities: ₱ 40.49 million (2024)

Service provider
  - Electricity: Biliran Electric Cooperative (BILECO)
- Time zone: UTC+8 (PST)
- ZIP code: 6544
- PSGC: 0807801000
- IDD : area code: +63 (0)53
- Native languages: Cebuano
- Website: www.almeria-biliran.gov.ph

Almeria (IPA: [ɐlme'ɾiɐ]), officially the Municipality of Almeria (Waray: Bungto han Almeria; Cebuano: Lungsod sa Almeria; Tagalog: Bayan ng Almeria), is a municipality in the province of Biliran, Philippines. According to the 2024 census, it has a population of 18,716 people.

== Geography ==
According to the Philippine Statistics Authority, the municipality has a land area of 57.46 square kilometres (22.19 sq mi) constituting 10.72% of the 536.01-square-kilometre- (206.95 sq mi) total area of Biliran.

=== Barangays ===
Almeria is politically subdivided into 13 barangays. Each barangay consists of puroks and some have sitios.

PSGC	Barangay	Population			±% p.a.	
		2024		2010		
087801001	Caucab	9.9%	1,859	1,638	▴	0.88%
087801002	Iyosan	7.6%	1,418	1,288	▴	0.67%
087801003	Jamorawon	8.1%	1,507	1,525	▾	−0.08%
087801004	Lo‑ok	6.6%	1,226	1,204	▴	0.13%
087801005	Matango	5.2%	964	931	▴	0.24%
087801006	Pili	6.8%	1,270	1,252	▴	0.10%
087801007	Poblacion	14.9%	2,783	3,059	▾	−0.66%
087801008	Pulang Bato	5.2%	971	949	▴	0.16%
087801009	Salangi	5.1%	946	829	▴	0.92%
087801010	Sampao	3.9%	735	726	▴	0.09%
087801011	Tabunan	4.6%	860	760	▴	0.86%
087801012	Talahid	6.8%	1,281	1,283	▾	−0.01%
087801013	Tamarindo	6.0%	1,131	1,051	▴	0.51%
	Total		18,716	16,495	▴	0.88%

=== Climate ===
Climate data for Almeria, Biliran
Month	Jan	Feb	Mar	Apr	May	Jun	Jul	Aug	Sep	Oct	Nov	Dec	Year
Mean daily maximum °C (°F)	28 (82)	29 (84)	29 (84)	31 (88)	31 (88)	30 (86)	30 (86)	30 (86)	30 (86)	29 (84)	29 (84)	29 (84)	30 (85)
Mean daily minimum °C (°F)	22 (72)	22 (72)	22 (72)	23 (73)	24 (75)	25 (77)	25 (77)	25 (77)	25 (77)	24 (75)	24 (75)	23 (73)	24 (75)
Average precipitation mm (inches)	73 (2.9)	56 (2.2)	75 (3.0)	71 (2.8)	114 (4.5)	174 (6.9)	172 (6.8)	163 (6.4)	167 (6.6)	161 (6.3)	158 (6.2)	125 (4.9)	1,509 (59.5)
Average rainy days	15.2	12.5	16.2	17.3	23.9	27.3	28.4	26.9	26.9	27.1	23.8	19.3	264.8
Source: Meteoblue

== Demographics ==
Population census of Almeria
Year	Pop.	±% p.a.
1903	4,340	—
1948	6,007	+0.72%
1960	7,553	+1.93%
1970	7,525	−0.04%
1975	9,468	+4.71%
1980	10,409	+1.91%
1990	12,013	+1.44%
1995	13,420	+2.10%
2000	13,854	+0.68%
2007	14,420	+0.55%
2010	16,495	+5.01%
2015	16,951	+0.52%
2020	17,954	+1.22%
2024	18,716	+1.00%
Source: Philippine Statistics Authority

In the 2020 census, Almeria had a population of 17,954. The population density was 310 inhabitants per square kilometre (800/sq mi).

== Economy ==
Poverty incidence of Almeria

Source: Philippine Statistics Authority

== Government ==
=== List of mayors ===
- Fructosa A. Victorioso — Mayor (Appointed) 1948-1949
- Jose K. Vero — Acting Mayor 1949-1951
- Elias G. Morillo — 1952-1955
- Victorino A. Jaguros — 1956-1959
- Jose K. Vero — 1964-1967
- Victorino A. Jaguros — 1968-1971
- Victorino A. Jaguros — 1972-1977
- Florentino S. Quijano — Acting Mayor from 1978 to 1979
- Simforosa R. Jaguros — Appointed Mayor (part of 1979, part of 1980)
- Florentino S. Quijano — 1980-1986
- Jose E. Victorioso — (Officer in Charge) 1986-1987
- Florentino S. Quijano — (Officer in Charge) 1987-1988
- Supremo T. Sabitsana — 1988-1992
- Supremo T. Sabitsana — 1992-1995
- Supremo T. Sabitsana — 1995-1998
- Antonio Agajan — 1998-2001
- Rolando E. Ty — 2001
