= Biliran =

Province in the Philippines

- Province
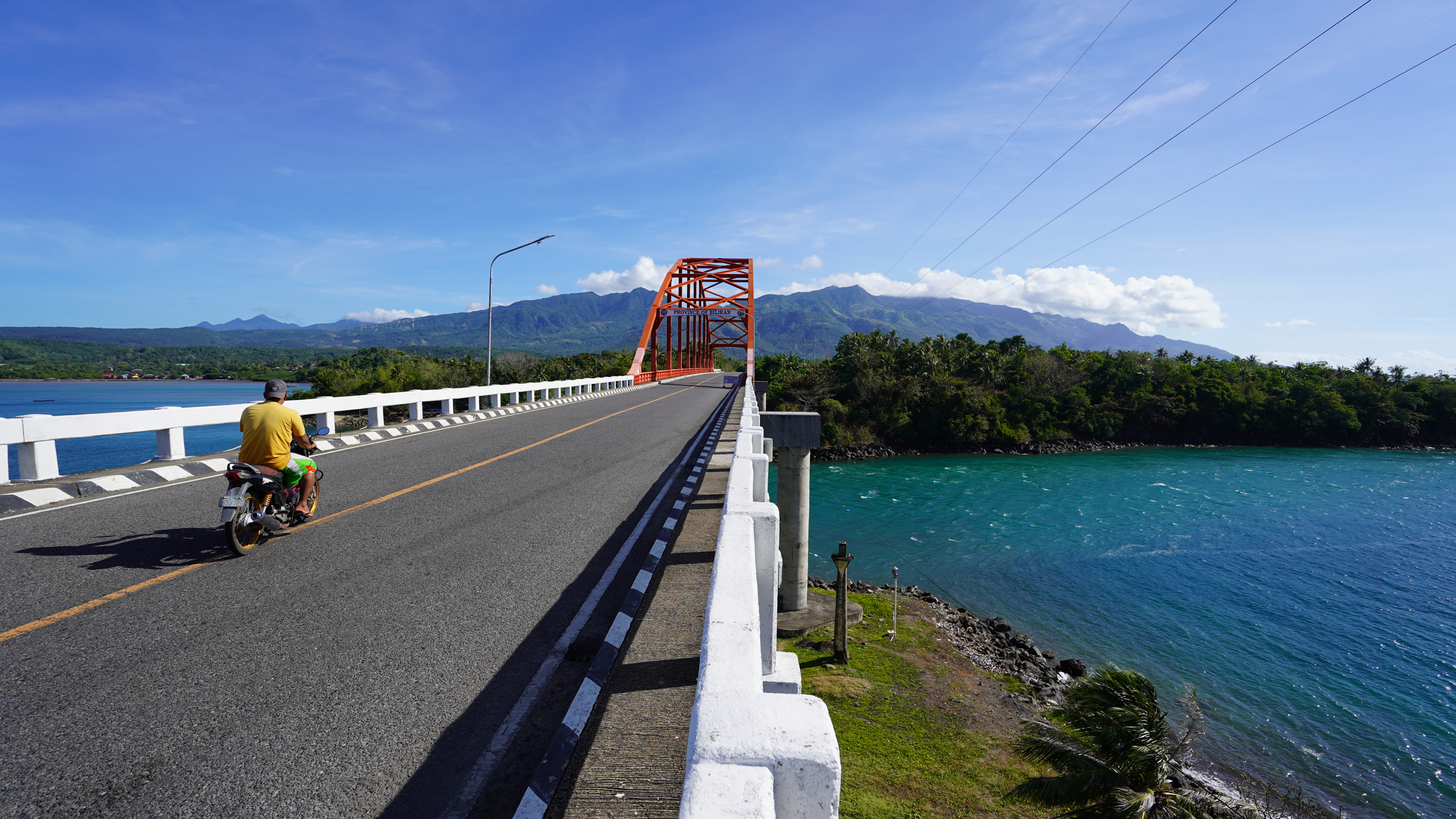
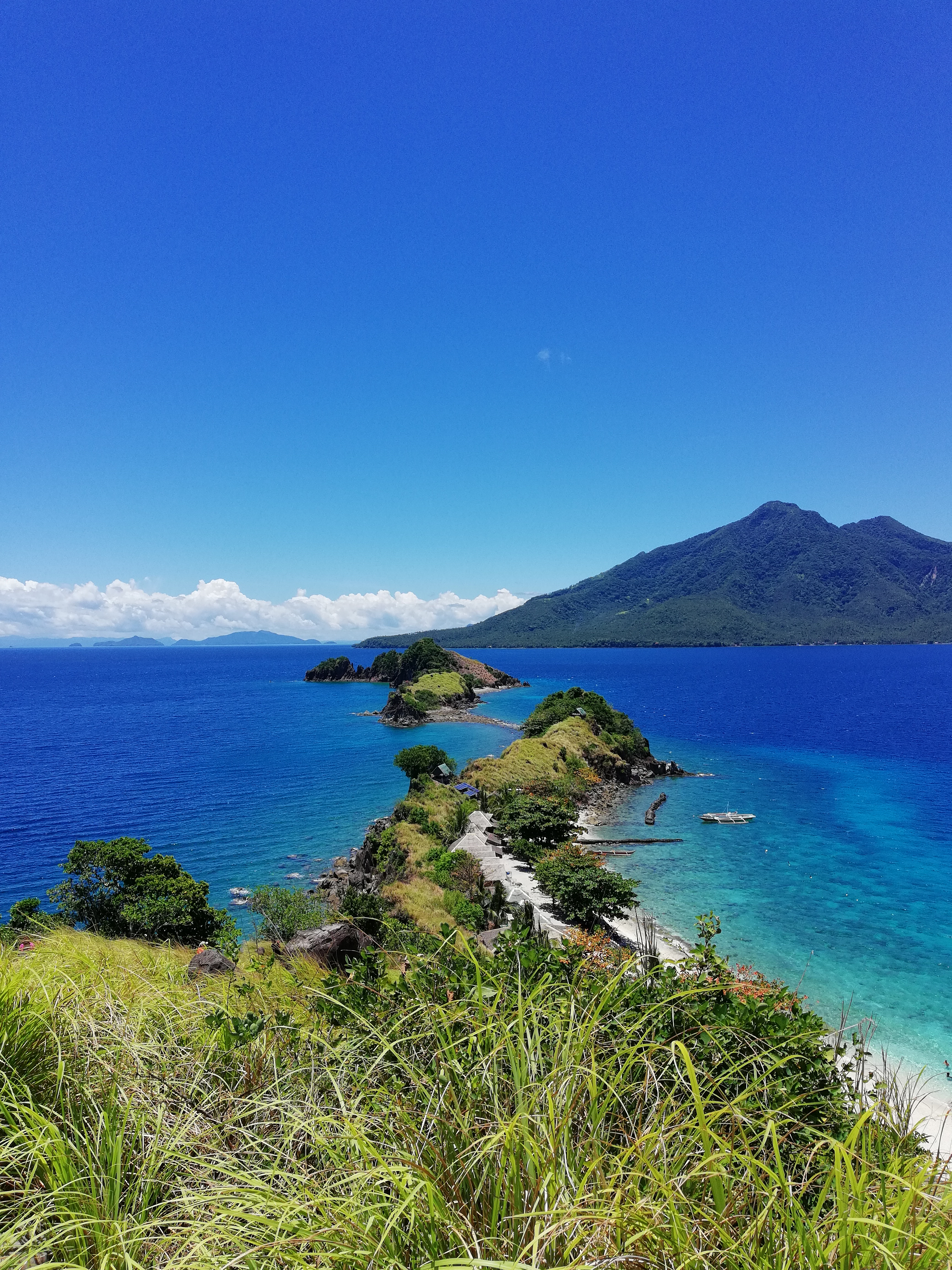
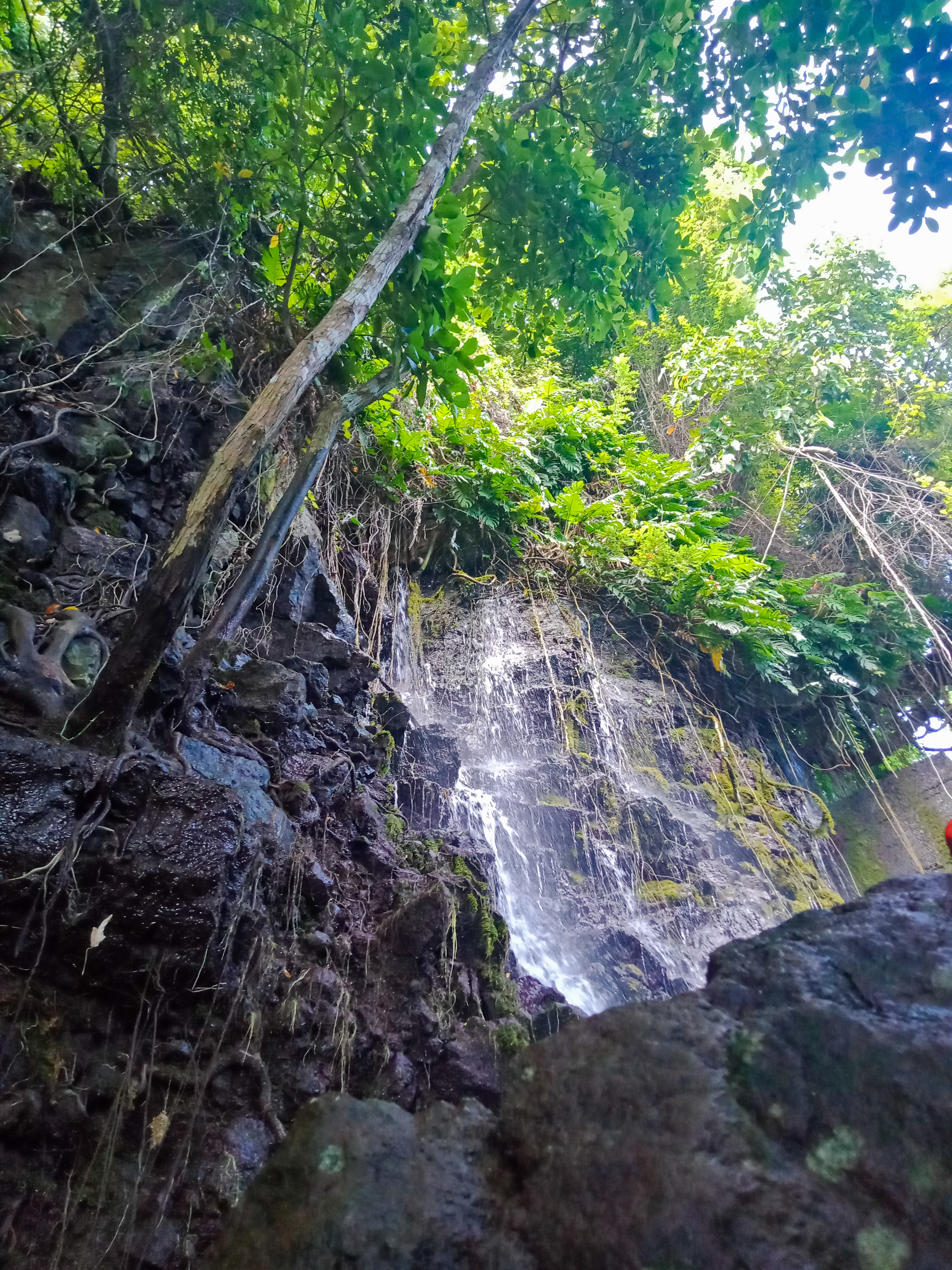
- top to bottom, left to right: Biliran Bridge, Sambawan Island, Tomalistis Falls

- Flag Seal

- Location in the Philippines
- Interactive map of Biliran
- Coordinates: 11°35′N 124°29′E
- Country: Philippines
- Region: Eastern Visayas
- Founded: May 11, 1992
- Capital and largest town: Naval

Government
  - Governor: Rogelio J. Espina (NP)
  - Vice Governor: Roselyn E. Paras (Lakas-CMD)
  - Representative: Gerardo Espina Jr.
  - Legislature: Biliran Provincial Board
  - Electorate: 124,191 voters (2025)

Area
  - Total: 536.01 km^{2} (206.95 sq mi)
  - Rank: 78th out of 82
- Highest elevation (Mount Naliwatan): 1,346 m (4,416 ft)

Population (2024 census)
  - Total: 184,095
  - Rank: 75th out of 82
  - Density: 343.45/km^{2} (889.54/sq mi)
  - Rank: 21st out of 82
  - Households: 43,053

Divisions
  - Independent cities: 0
  - Component cities: 0
  - Municipalities: 8: Almeria; Biliran; Cabucgayan; Caibiran; Culaba; Kawayan; Maripipi; Naval
  - Barangays: 132
  - Districts: Lone district of Biliran

Economy
  - Income class: 2nd provincial income class
  - Poverty incidence: 8.5% (2023)
  - Revenue: ₱ 1,144 million (2024)
  - Assets: ₱ 2,543 million (2024)
  - Expenditure: ₱ 1,067 million (2024)
  - Liabilities: ₱ 394 million (2024)
- Time zone: UTC+8 (PHT)
- PSGC: 087800000
- IDD : area code: +63 (0)53
- ISO 3166 code: PH-BIL
- Spoken languages: Waray; Cebuano; Tagalog; English
- Website: biliran.gov.ph

Biliran, officially the Province of Biliran (Waray-Waray: Probinsya han Biliran; Cebuano: Lalawigan sa Biliran; Filipino: Lalawigan ng Biliran), is an island province in the Philippines located in the Eastern Visayas region (Region VIII). Biliran is one of the country's smallest and newest provinces. Formerly a sub-province of Leyte, it became an independent province in 1992.

Biliran lies less than a kilometer north of the island of Leyte. A bridge-causeway fixed link over Poro Island in the gateway town of Biliran connects the province to Leyte. Its capital is the municipality of Naval on the western coast of the island which is the most populous in the province.

== Etymology ==
During the early Spanish era, Biliran Island was called Isla de Panamao. The present name, believed to be adopted sometime between the late 17th century and the early 18th century, was, according to many publications, derived from a type grass called borobiliran that grew abundantly on the island's plains. However, a contending theory states that the name came from the word bilir, which was defined in an old Visayan dictionary to be the "corner or edge of a boat, vase or anything protruding, like veins, or the furrow made by the plow." The dictionary also gives biliran as an alternate spelling for bilir. This theory is supported by the fact that Biliran was site of the first large-scale shipyard (astillero), built in the 17th century to service the Manila Galleons.

== History ==
=== Spanish colonial period ===
The first town, named Biliran, was founded in 1712 under the jurisdiction of Cebu, after petitioning for a municipality and parish status. Biliran island, together with the islands of Samar and Leyte, were constituted into a separate province in 1735. Later when Samar and Leyte were split into two provinces in 1768, Biliran became part of Leyte Province as its sub-province. The first parish priest, Gaspar Ignacio de Guevara, was assigned in 1765, but its parish status was apparently withdrawn because of Padre Gaspar's apostasy. The parish was re-established on February 22, 1782.

==== Moro raids ====
In May 1735, representative inhabitants of Leyte petitioned Governor-General Fernando Valdes y Tamon to allow them to resettle Biliran Island. They claimed it had been abandoned for the past 50 years and was presently inhabited by bagamundos (vagabonds) due to the frequent Moro raids.

On May 26, 1754, Moros destroyed Biliran and the town of Catbalogan in Samar. Panamao was reportedly razed to the ground and only the gobernadorcillo (mayor) of Biliran town escaped capture by the raiders. The old settlements of Caybiran, Mapuyo and Maripipi were also destroyed by the Moros.

The Moros staged their attack by marching inland along the Anas River for a distance of 1.5-2 leguas (leagues). Having covered part of the interior around a mountain, they managed to capture the inhabitants, with the exception of the gobernadorcillo who escaped. The houses and property of the natives were burned or destroyed. The church building suffered the same fate and its valuables were taken away by the raiders.

==== Post-Muslim raids ====
When the Muslim raiders were diminished in the early 19th century, Leytenians organized new towns in the present geography of Biliran Province.

In 1828, Caibiran on the east became an independent municipality and parish, the second to be created on Biliran Island.

Naval became the third town, carved out of the territory of Biliran town. It first became a separate parish in 1860. The Spanish colonial government officially recognized its municipality status on September 23, 1869, following the petition submitted around 1861.

Almeria became a separate town in 1886 and was named after the city of Almería in Spain.

Maripipi used to be a barrio of Naval. It was officially inaugurated as a town in 1867, two years ahead of its mother town, then folded up and was reduced into a barrio of Almeria, and then became a town again in 1899. Maripipi and the new towns of San Clemente (later Kawayan), Culaba and Esperanza (later Cabucgayan) were created around 1899 by the revolutionary government under President Emilio Aguinaldo.

=== Japanese occupation ===
During the World War II, Biliran had its own guerrilla forces under the Leyte command of Colonel Ruperto Kangleon. The guerrilla operation was of invaluable assistance to the successful landing of the American liberation forces at Palo, Leyte, on October 20, 1944, just before the Battle of Leyte Gulf.

In 1945, Biliran was liberated by the Philippine Commonwealth forces of the 9th Infantry Division of the Philippine Commonwealth Army who landed in Biliran. Aided by the local guerrilla forces, they attacked the Japanese troops on the island during the Battle of Biliran during World War II.

=== Philippine independence ===
==== Provincehood ====
On April 8, 1959, Republic Act No. 2141 was signed into law effectively making Biliran a sub-province of Leyte. The island became an independent province on May 11, 1992, through Republic Act No. 7160, making it one of the newest provinces in the country.

== Geography ==
Biliran Island
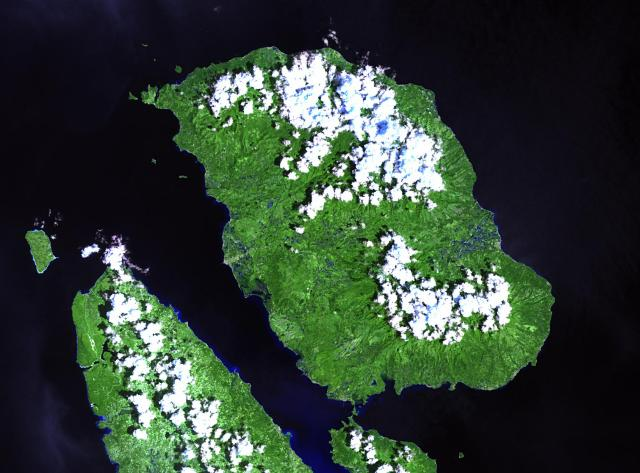
- NASA Landsat image of Biliran
- Interactive map of Biliran Island

Geography
- Location: Samar Sea
- Coordinates: 11.523°N 124.535°E
- Archipelago: Visayas
- Area: 535 km^{2} (207 sq mi)
- Highest elevation: 1,340 m (4400 ft)

Administration
- Philippines

Biliran has a total land area of 536.01 square kilometres (206.95 sq mi), making it the fourth smallest province in the Philippines. The island lies off the northern coast of Leyte island across Biliran Strait. To the southeast is Carigara Bay, to the northeast is the Samar Sea, and across this sea is Samar. To the west is the Visayan Sea and Masbate lies 30 kilometres (19 mi) to the northwest. The province is composed of two major volcanic islands: the main island also named Biliran and Maripipi, a smaller island to the northwest. Other smaller islands include Higatangan and Dalutan.

=== Topography ===
The main volcanic island of Biliran features mountainous interiors with very narrow coastal areas. Only the municipalities of Naval and Caibiran have wide plains extending about 7 km (4.3 mi) from the coast suitable for agriculture. Mount Suiro, an inactive volcano, is the highest point on Biliran with an elevation of 1,301 m (4,268 ft).

The only known historical volcanic activity at Biliran was a phreatic eruption and possible debris avalanche at a thermal area on September 26, 1939. Ashfalls were reported at Caibiran and adjoining areas with maximum deposits at 6.35 centimetres (2.50 in) thick. There are five active solfatara fields on the island. The solfatara on the west side of Mt. Giron contained more than 400 tones of sulfur in 1880.

Maripipi is a 924-metre (3,031 ft) volcanic island with the Maripipi Volcano located in the center and the Municipality of Maripipi surrounding its shores and lower slopes. The volcano is classified as potentially active but has had no historical eruptions.

=== Climate ===
Biliran has a combination of warm and cool climatic zones, thus the prevailing climate is ideal for the cultivation of a wide range of agricultural crops. There is no distinct dry season but the heavy wet season generally occurs in December.

Climate data for Biliran
Month	Jan	Feb	Mar	Apr	May	Jun	Jul	Aug	Sep	Oct	Nov	Dec	Year
Mean daily maximum °C (°F)	29.2 (84.6)	30.3 (86.5)	31.5 (88.7)	32.4 (90.3)	32.5 (90.5)	32.3 (90.1)	32 (90)	32.1 (89.8)	32 (90)	31.6 (88.9)	31 (88)	30 (86)	31.4 (88.6)
Mean daily minimum °C (°F)	23.9 (75.0)	24 (75)	24.5 (76.1)	25.2 (77.4)	25.6 (78.1)	25.4 (77.7)	25.3 (77.5)	25.3 (77.5)	25.2 (77.4)	25.1 (77.2)	24.7 (76.5)	24.1 (75.4)	24.9 (76.7)
Average precipitation mm (inches)	290.5 (11.44)	241 (9.5)	192.2 (7.57)	118.2 (4.65)	139.2 (5.48)	189.5 (7.46)	178.5 (7.03)	184.4 (7.26)	155 (6.1)	215.2 (8.47)	265.4 (10.45)	385.5 (15.18)	2,554.6 (100.59)
Average rainy days	21	17	16	14	13	15	16	16	15	18	20	21	202
Source 1: Storm247 (for average temperature and rainy days)
Source 2: WorldWeatherOnline (for average precipitation)

=== Administrative divisions ===
Biliran is subdivided into 8 municipalities, with a total of 132 barangays. All municipalities are located on Biliran Island, with the exception of Maripipi, which is an island municipality located to the northwest. The largest among the towns in terms of land area is the provincial capital Naval, while the smallest is Maripipi.

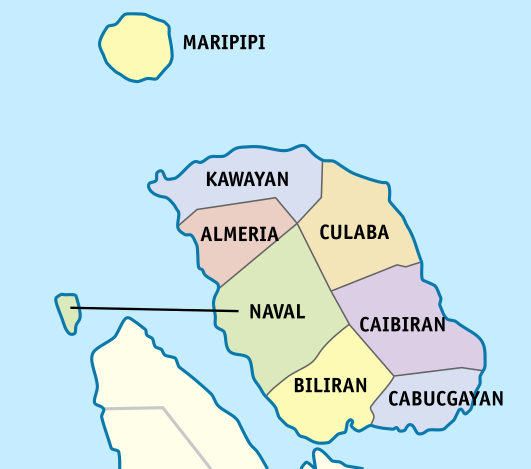
Political divisions

Municipality (Note: The globe icon marks the town center.)		Population			±% p.a.	Area		Density		Barangay
		(2020)		(2015)		km^{2}	sq mi	/km^{2}	/sq mi	
Almeria		10.0%	17,954	16,951	+1.10%	57.46	22.19	310	800	13
Biliran		9.8%	17,662	16,882	+0.86%	70.30	27.14	250	650	11
Cabucgayan		12.0%	21,542	20,788	+0.68%	54.19	20.92	400	1,000	13
Caibiran		13.5%	24,167	22,524	+1.35%	83.55	32.26	290	750	17
Culaba		7.2%	12,972	12,325	+0.98%	73.42	28.35	180	470	17
Kawayan		11.4%	20,455	20,291	+0.15%	61.02	23.56	340	880	20
Maripipi		3.6%	6,373	7,159	−2.19%	27.83	10.75	230	600	15
Naval	†	32.5%	58,187	54,692	+1.19%	108.24	41.79	540	1,400	26
Total			179,312	171,612	+0.84%	536.01	206.95	330	850	132
	† Provincial capital					Municipality				

== Demographics ==
Population census of Biliran
Year	Pop.	±% p.a.
1903	21,661	—
1918	35,751	+3.40%
1939	54,367	+2.02%
1948	67,661	+2.46%
1960	87,285	+2.14%
1970	90,498	+0.36%
1975	103,270	+2.68%
1980	111,421	+1.53%
1990	118,012	+0.58%
1995	132,209	+2.15%
2000	140,274	+1.28%
2007	150,031	+0.93%
2010	161,760	+2.78%
2015	171,612	+1.13%
2020	179,312	+0.93%
Source: Philippine Statistics Authority

The population of Biliran in the 2024 census was 179,312 people, with a density of 330 inhabitants per square kilometre or 850 inhabitants per square mile.

Based on the May 2000 census, the province had a total population of 140,274, which made it the fifth least populous province in the country, and the smallest in the region. There were 27,907 households in the province with an average size of 5.02 persons, slightly higher than the national average of 4.99. 87.05% of the population was Roman Catholic.

=== Languages ===
Waray-Waray and Cebuano are the languages spoken by the majority of the people in Biliran Province. The latter is primarily spoken in Naval, Almeria and Kawayan. Whereas Waray-waray is spoken in the towns of Caibiran, Culaba, Cabucgayan, Biliran and Maripipi. Both are Visayan languages.

The majority of the residents also speak and understand English and Filipino.

== Economy ==
Poverty incidence of Biliran (%)

Source: Philippine Statistics Authority

The economy of Biliran is largely based on fishing. Most of its towns, especially Naval and Biliran, have excellent seaports. There are 95 hectares (230 acres) of brackish water fish ponds which produce prawns, shrimps and milkfish. Another 30 hectares (74 acres) of seawater are suitable for seaweed farming and 10 more hectares for fishcage culture.

Being mountainous, Biliran can support various agricultural crops. The warm lowlands are conducive to rice (palay) production and other tropical crops. The cool highlands are favorable to high-value crops such as cut flowers and varieties of upland vegetables.

The inhabitants also engage in hunting, lumber, and manufacturing. The principal raw material produced is copra and coconut oil. Processed goods include white clay ceramics, dried fish, raw gulaman, and citronella oil.

The untapped natural resources of the island include geothermal power and the abundant sulfur and gypsum deposits.

Major industries includes fashion bags, Romblon bags, baskets, shellcrafts, placemats, hot pads, beverage coasters and trays.

Biliran has been eyed as an emerging destination for mountaineers, bikers, canyoneers, hikers, and other adventure seekers. For example, Sampao River in the municipality of Almeria has been developed into a canyoning venue.

== Government ==
Current Provincial Government Officials (2025-2028)

- Governor: Rogelio J. Espina (Nacionalista)
- Vice-Governor: Roselyn E. Paras (Lakas)

Sangguniang Panlalawigan Members

1st District

- Brigido C. Caneja III (Lakas)
- Lucille C. Roa (Nacionalista)
- Miguel J. Cases Jr. (Nacionalista)
- Manolo D. Rubi (Lakas)

2nd District

- Carlos L. Chan (Lakas)
- Allan Paul U. Tubis (Nacionalista)
- Nilo P. Peñaflor (Nacionalista)
- Lorenzo A. Reveldez Jr. (Independent)

Ex-Officio Members

- TBD (President, Liga ng mga Barangay)
- TBD (President, PCL)
- TBD (President, Panlalawigang Pederasyon ng Sangguniang Kabataan)

== House of Representatives ==
District	Representative	Party	Term	Bloc
Lone	Gerardo J. Espina Jr.	Lakas	3	Majority

== Points of interest ==
- Bagongbong Falls

It is also called Bagumbong falls, in a forested area of Almeria town.

- Ulan-ulan Falls

Derived from the Visayan dialect which means "rain," the falls' cascading waters form a catch basin with water sufficient for swimming.

- Recoletos Falls

The waterfall which is approximately 15 meters high, has a wide pool with deep water.

- Kasabangan Falls

There are 13 layers of this waterfall from its highest level up in the mountain.

- Tingkasan Bat Cave
- Iyusan Rice Terraces

A manmade agricultural landform and tourist attraction found in Barangay Iyusan, Almeria, Biliran.

== See also ==
- Biliran Watchtower
- List of islands of the Philippines
