= Naval, Biliran =

Capital of Biliran, Philippines

Naval
- Municipality
- Municipality of Naval
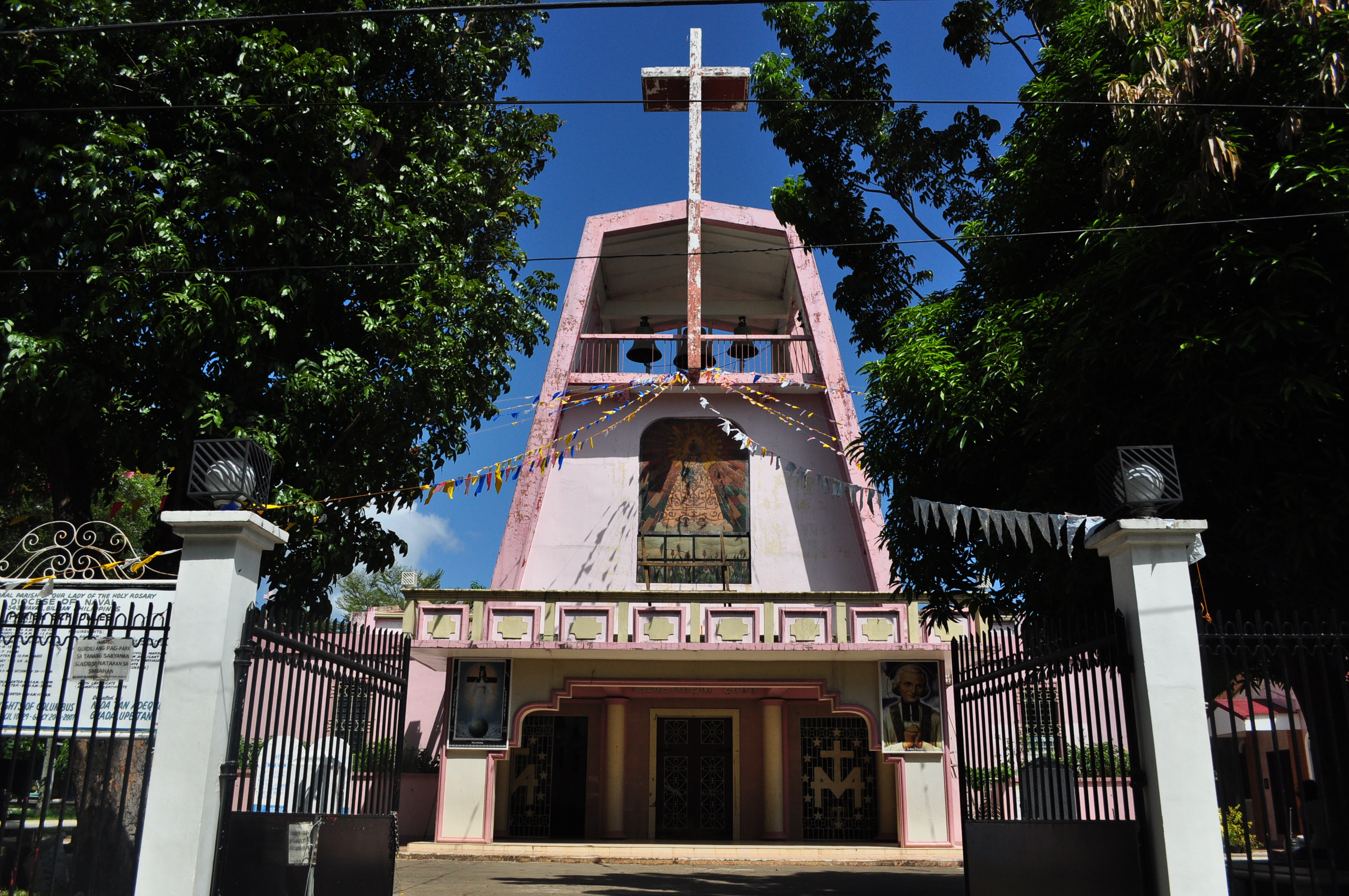
- Naval Cathedral

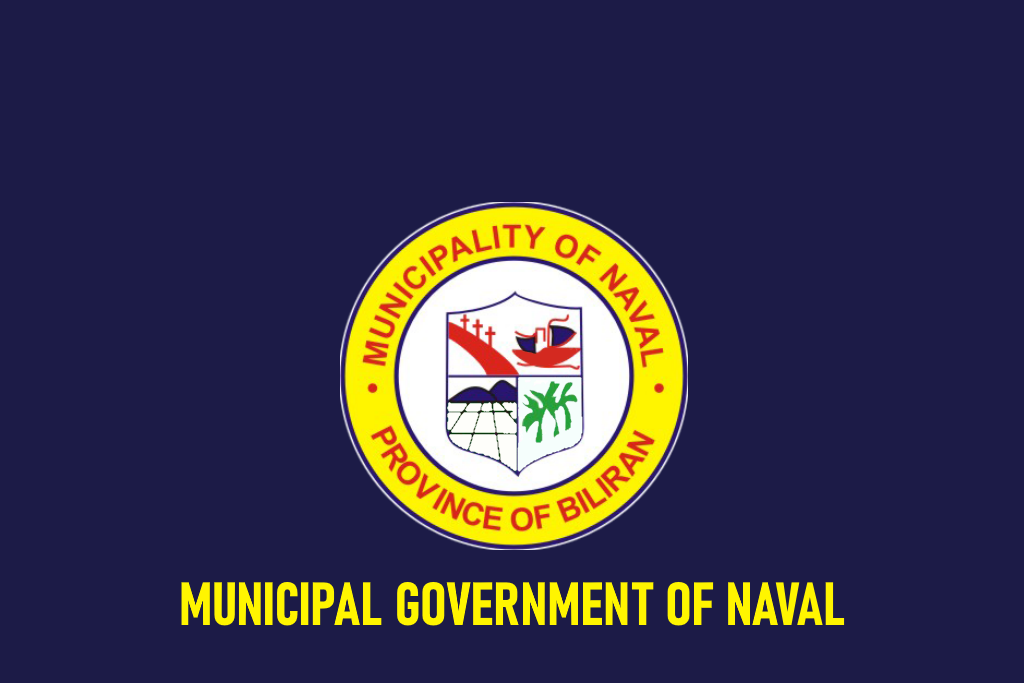
- Flag Seal

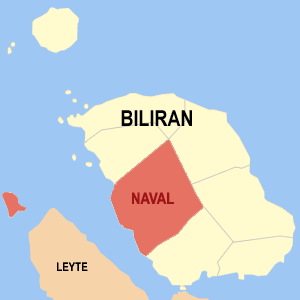
- Map of Biliran with Naval highlighted
- Interactive map of Naval
- Location within the Philippines
- Coordinates: 11°35′N 124°27′E
- Country: Philippines
- Region: Eastern Visayas
- Province: Biliran
- District: Lone district
- Founded: September 26, 1869
- Barangays: 26 (see Barangays)

Government
  - Type: Sangguniang Bayan
  - Mayor: Gretchen Stephanie Espina
  - Vice Mayor: Vicente V. Curso
  - Representative: Gerardo J. Espina Jr.
  - Councilors: List: • Camilo S. Castro; • Martin L. Lagat; • Ofelia T. Espina; • Ben T. Olid; • Marietta C. Ebio; • Ana L. Meracap; • Fina G. Josep; • Eduardo B. Gaviola; DILG Masterlist of Officials
  - Electorate: 34,330 voters (2025)

Area
  - Total: 108.24 km^{2} (41.79 sq mi)
- Elevation: 41 m (135 ft)
- Highest elevation: 433 m (1,421 ft)
- Lowest elevation: 0 m (0 ft)

Population (2024 census)
  - Total: 59,236
  - Density: 547.27/km^{2} (1,417.4/sq mi)
  - Households: 13,727

Economy
  - Income class: 1st municipal income class
  - Poverty incidence: 13.54% (2023)
  - Revenue: ₱ 271.1 million (2024)
  - Assets: ₱ 97.98 million (2024)
  - Expenditure: ₱ 287.7 million (2024)
  - Liabilities: ₱ 24.74 million (2024)

Service provider
  - Electricity: Biliran Electric Cooperative (BILECO)
- Time zone: UTC+8 (PST)
- ZIP code: 6543
- PSGC: 0807808000
- IDD : area code: +63 (0)53
- Native languages: Cebuano; Waray; Tagalog

Naval (IPA: [nɐ'val]), officially the Municipality of Naval (Waray: Bungto han Naval; Cebuano: Lungsod sa Naval; Tagalog: Bayan ng Naval), is a municipality and capital of the province of Biliran, Philippines. According to the 2020 census, it has a population of 58,187 people making it the most populous in the province.

== History ==
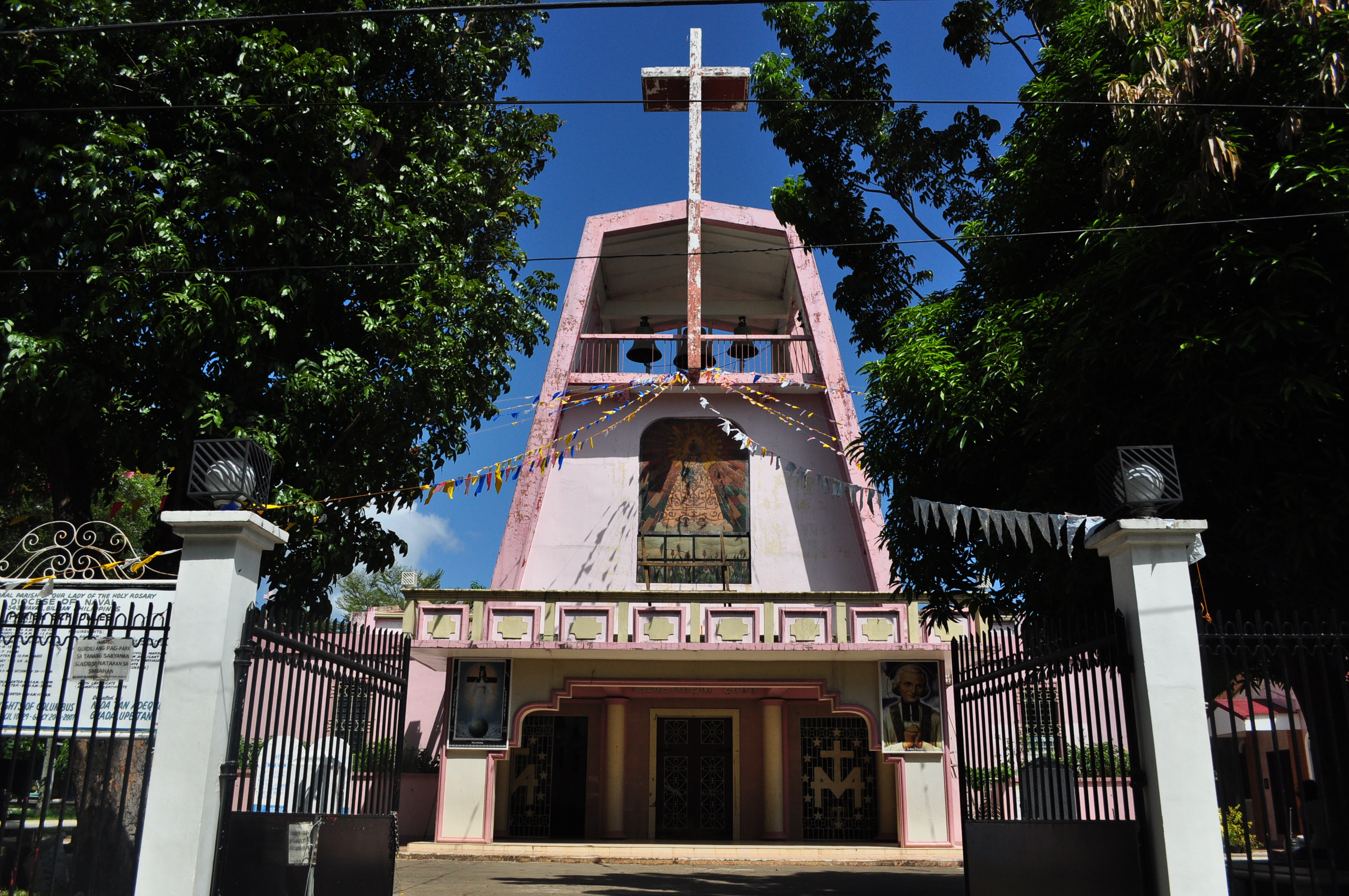
The Cathedral of Naval, whose parish was founded in 1860, nine years before the 1869 formal establishment of the pueblo of Naval.

The town of Naval was once named Bagazumbol, which was perceived by natives as being too warlike a description. The aboriginal name was later modified in 1859 to a more peaceful name—the presently known Naval.

On May 26, 1860, Naval was separated from Biliran, but it became an independent parish only in September later that year. The following year, on July 31, 1861, Romualdo Ximeno, Bishop of Cebu, officially declared Naval an independent parish. In August 1861, Father Santos de Santa Juana took up formal residence as the first parish priest of Naval and served the town for twenty-one years until 1882.

On September 26, 1869, Naval was officially established and recognized as an independent pueblo.

In 1957, the barrio of Higatangan was abolished, and its sitios of Libertad and Mabini were converted into barrios.

== Geography ==
Higatangan Island (11°34′0″N 124°16′0″E) is under jurisdiction of Naval Municipality.

According to the Philippine Statistics Authority, the municipality has a land area of 108.24 square kilometres (41.79 sq mi) constituting 20.19% of the 536.01-square-kilometre- (206.95 sq mi) total area of Biliran, making it the largest municipality in the province.

=== Barangays ===
Naval is politically subdivided into 26 barangays. Each barangay consists of puroks and some have sitios.

Barangays Libertad and Mabini are located in Higatangan Island.

PSGC	Barangay	Population			±% p.a.	
		2024		2010		
087808001	Agpangi	4.3%	2,536	2,371	▴	0.47%
087808002	Anislagan	1.1%	681	602	▴	0.86%
087808003	Atipolo	6.3%	3,709	3,325	▴	0.76%
087808004	Calumpang	10.8%	6,398	5,121	▴	1.56%
087808005	Capiñahan	4.1%	2,411	2,272	▴	0.41%
087808006	Caraycaray	7.1%	4,177	3,701	▴	0.84%
087808007	Catmon	2.7%	1,625	1,486	▴	0.62%
087808008	Haguikhikan	3.0%	1,788	1,621	▴	0.68%
087808009	Padre Inocentes Garcia (Poblacion)	9.1%	5,397	4,744	▴	0.90%
087808010	Libertad	1.5%	864	917	▾	−0.41%
087808012	Lico	1.8%	1,038	910	▴	0.92%
087808013	Lucsoon	3.1%	1,845	1,568	▴	1.14%
087808014	Mabini	1.6%	932	984	▾	−0.38%
087808015	San Pablo	3.0%	1,787	1,678	▴	0.44%
087808016	Santo Niño	5.0%	2,960	2,627	▴	0.83%
087808017	Santissimo Rosario Poblacion (Santo Rosa)	4.0%	2,379	2,420	▾	−0.12%
087808018	Talustusan	3.3%	1,932	1,878	▴	0.20%
087808019	Villa Caneja	1.6%	961	854	▴	0.82%
087808020	Villa Consuelo	3.1%	1,819	1,764	▴	0.21%
087808021	Borac	1.3%	787	728	▴	0.54%
087808022	Cabungaan	0.7%	398	383	▴	0.27%
087808023	Imelda	1.9%	1,099	958	▴	0.96%
087808024	Larrazabal	6.8%	4,009	3,200	▴	1.58%
087808025	Libtong	2.0%	1,209	989	▴	1.40%
087808026	Padre Sergio Eamiguel	2.6%	1,528	1,270	▴	1.29%
087808027	Sabang	0.7%	423	428	▾	−0.08%
	Total		59,236	48,799	▴	1.35%

=== Climate ===
Climate data for Naval, Biliran
Month	Jan	Feb	Mar	Apr	May	Jun	Jul	Aug	Sep	Oct	Nov	Dec	Year
Mean daily maximum °C (°F)	28 (82)	29 (84)	29 (84)	31 (88)	31 (88)	30 (86)	30 (86)	30 (86)	30 (86)	29 (84)	29 (84)	29 (84)	30 (85)
Mean daily minimum °C (°F)	22 (72)	22 (72)	22 (72)	23 (73)	24 (75)	25 (77)	25 (77)	25 (77)	25 (77)	24 (75)	24 (75)	23 (73)	24 (75)
Average precipitation mm (inches)	73 (2.9)	56 (2.2)	75 (3.0)	71 (2.8)	114 (4.5)	174 (6.9)	172 (6.8)	163 (6.4)	167 (6.6)	161 (6.3)	158 (6.2)	125 (4.9)	1,509 (59.5)
Average rainy days	15.2	12.5	16.2	17.3	23.9	27.3	28.4	26.9	26.9	27.1	23.8	19.3	264.8
Source: Meteoblue

== Demographics ==
Population census of Naval

Year	Pop.	±% p.a.
1903	4,617	—
1918	7,047	+2.86%
1939	11,696	+2.44%
1948	12,506	+0.75%
1960	15,124	+1.60%
1970	20,286	+2.98%
1975	22,269	+1.89%
1980	26,499	+3.54%

Year	Pop.	±% p.a.
1990	29,811	+1.18%
1995	32,954	+1.90%
2000	37,974	+3.09%
2007	44,288	+2.14%
2010	48,799	+3.59%
2015	54,692	+2.20%
2020	58,187	+1.31%
2024	59,236	+0.43%

Source: Philippine Statistics Authority

In the 2024 census, Naval had a population of 59,236 people. The population density was 550 inhabitants per square kilometre (1,400/sq mi).

== Economy ==
Poverty incidence of Naval (%)

Source: Philippine Statistics Authority

== Government ==
The mayors of Naval were Absalon Sablada who served from 1952 to 1955; Brigido Caneja Sr. from 1956 to 1971; Arturo Velasquez from 1972 to 1979; Niceto Limpiado from 1980 to 1986; Fortunato Casas from 1986 to 1987; Gorgonio Contredas and Francisca Bangcuyo in 1987; and Simeon Pitao from 1988 to 1997. Gerardo J. Espina Jr. from 1998 to 2004, and Gerardo S. Espina Sr. from 2004 to 2006. Presently, the town is headed by Gerard Roger Espina.

== Transportation ==
- By land: Buses and vans travel to Tacloban (in Leyte); jeepneys go to other towns in Biliran; tricycles or habal-habals are the mode of transport within Naval.
- By air: The town is served by Biliran Airport (ICAO: RPVQ). Biliran Airport has a runway length of 1,000 metres (3,300 ft).
- By sea: Pump boats can be taken or chartered for going to Leyte, Higatangan Island, Naval and Mariripi.

== Healthcare ==
Naval has the following health facilities:

- Naval Municipal Health Center
- Biliran Provincial Hospital
- Naval Doctors' Healthcare Services
- FCE Polyclinic and Diagnostic
- Mother and Child Clinic

== Education ==
The main campus of Biliran Province State University (BiPSU) is located in Naval.

Public secondary schools:

- Biliran Province State University-Laboratory High School (BiPSU-LHS)
- Naval School of Fisheries (NSF)
- Naval National High School (NNHS)
- Lucsoon National High School (LNHS)
- Higatangan National High School (HNHS)

Private secondary schools:

- Cathedral School of La Naval (CSN)
- Limpiado Memorial Foundation, Inc. (Lightbringer Learning Center)

Public elementary schools:

- Naval Central School (Naval North District)
- Naval SpEd (Special Education) Center
- Caraycaray Central School (Naval South District)
- Agpangi Elementary School
- Anislagan Elementary School
- Atipolo Elementary School
- Borac Elementary School
- Cabungaan Elementary School
- Calumpang Elementary School
- Capinahan Elementary School
- Catmon Elementary School
- Haguikhikan Elementary School
- Higatangan Elementary School
- Imelda Elementary School
- Larazabal Elementary School
- Libtong Elementary School
- Lico Elementary School
- Lucsoon Elementary School
- P.S. Eamiguel Elementary School
- San Pablo Elementary School
- Sabang Elementary School
- Talustusan Elementary School
- Villa Caneja Elementary School
- Villa Consuelo Elementary School

Private elementary schools:

- Cathedral School of La Naval
- Limpiado Memorial Foundation, Inc. (Lightbringer Learning Center)
