= Gerardo Espina Jr. =

Filipino politician

Gerardo J. Espina Jr.
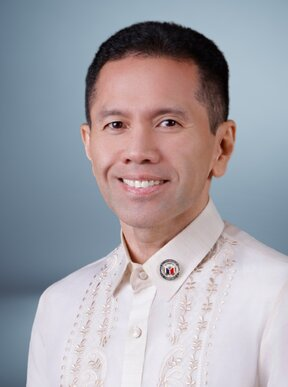
- Official portrait, 2025

Member of the Philippine House of Representatives from Biliran's at-large district
- Incumbent
- Assumed office June 30, 2019
- Preceded by: Rogelio J. Espina
- In office June 30, 2004 – June 30, 2007
- Preceded by: Gerardo S. Espina Sr.
- Succeeded by: Glenn A. Chong

Governor of Biliran
- In office June 30, 2010 – June 30, 2019
- Vice Governor: Manuel Montejo (2010–2013); Eriberto D. Tubis, Jr. (2013–2019)
- Preceded by: Rogelio J. Espina
- Succeeded by: Rogelio J. Espina

Mayor of Naval, Biliran
- In office June 30, 1998 – June 30, 2004
- Preceded by: Simeon C. Pitao
- Succeeded by: Gerardo S. Espina, Sr.

Personal details
- Born: August 7, 1970 (age 56) Sampaloc, Manila, Philippines
- Party: Lakas (2020–present)
- Other political affiliations: PDP–Laban (2018–2020); Liberal (2012–2018); Nacionalista (2009–2012); KAMPI (2004–2009)
- Education: Philippine School of Business Administration (BSBA)

Gerardo Jimenez Espina Jr. (born August 7, 1970), also known as Gerry Espina, is a Filipino politician. He is currently serving as the representative of Biliran's lone district, a position he also held from 2004 to 2007. He had also served as governor of Biliran from 2010 to 2019 and as mayor of Naval, Biliran from 1998 to 2004.

In February 2025, Espina was one of the 95 Lakas–CMD members who voted to impeach vice president Sara Duterte.

== Early life ==
Gerardo Jimenez Espina Jr. was born on August 7, 1970, in Manila, the son of a former congressman and mayor, Gerardo Sabinay Espina Sr. He finished both his elementary and secondary education at the San Beda College. He finished Bachelor in Marketing at the Philippine School of Business Administration in, Quezon City in 1992. He is uncle to singer entertainer Gretchen Espina.

Espina is a member of one of the longest serving political dynasties in Biliran dating back in the 1970s. His father was a delegate of the 1972 Constitutional Convention, three term member of the House of Representatives and Mayor of Naval, Biliran. His brothers Rogelio, former governor, now congressman of the same district and Rodolfo, Mayor of Kawayan, Biliran, and sister Roselyn, one-time councilor of Naval.

== Political career ==
=== Mayor of Naval, Biliran (1998–2004) ===
Espina started his political career as the municipal mayor of Naval, Biliran in 1998 and served until 2004.

=== House of Representatives (2004–2007; 2019–present) ===
From 2004 up to 2007, he was a member of the House of Representatives as representative of the lone district of Biliran.

In 2019, Espina was elected to a second term in Congress under PDP-Laban, defeating Romulo "Mulong" Bernardes. In February 2020, Espina left PDP-Laban to join the Lakas–CMD party.

On February 5, 2025, Espina was among the 95 Lakas–CMD members who voted to impeach vice president Sara Duterte.

==== Committee membership ====
As a member of House of Representatives, Espina was the Vice Chairman of the House Committee on Agriculture, Food and Fisheries and of the House Committee on Youth and Sports Development. Congressman Espina also had memberships in the following house committees: Accounts; Basic Education and Culture; Energy; Foreign Affairs; Games and Amusement; Higher and Technical Education; Legislative Franchises; Local Government; National Defense and Security; Natural Resources; People's Participation; Public Order and Security; Tourism; and Ways and Means.

=== Governor of Biliran (2010–2019) ===
In the May 10, 2010, elections, he became a governor of the province of Biliran, Philippines, serving for three terms up to 2019.

Political offices
Preceded by Simeon C. Pitao	Mayor of Naval, Biliran; 1998–2004	Succeeded by Gerardo S. Espina, Sr.
Preceded by Rogelio J. Espina	Governor of Biliran; 2010–2019	Succeeded by Rogelio J. Espina
House of Representatives of the Philippines
Preceded by Gerardo S. Espina, Sr.	Member of the House of Representatives from Biliran's at-large district 2004–2007; 2019–present	Succeeded by Glenn A. Chong
Preceded by Rogelio J. Espina	Member of the House of Representatives from Biliran's at-large district 2004–2007; 2019–present	Incumbent
