= Biliran's at-large congressional district =

House of Representatives of the Philippines legislative district

- Constituency for the House of Representatives of the Philippines
- Location of Biliran within the Philippines
- Province: Biliran
- Region: Eastern Visayas
- Population: 179,312 (2020)
- Electorate: 124,191 (2025)
- Area: 536.01 km^{2} (206.95 sq mi)

Current constituency
- Created: 1991
- Representative: Gerardo Espina Jr.
- Political party: Lakas–CMD
- Congressional bloc: Majority

Biliran's at-large congressional district is the sole congressional district of the Philippines in the province of Biliran. It was created ahead of the 1995 Philippine House of Representatives elections following its conversion into a regular province under the 1991 Local Government Code (Republic Act No. 7160) which was ratified in a 1992 plebiscite concurrent with that year's general election. Biliran had been a sub-province of Leyte since 1959 and was last represented as part of Leyte's 3rd district in the House of Representatives from 1987 to 1995 and earlier from 1961 to 1972, the multi-member Region VIII's at-large district in the Interim Batasang Pambansa from 1978 to 1984, and the multi-member Leyte's at-large district in the Regular Batasang Pambansa from 1984 to 1986. It is currently represented in the 20th Congress by Gerardo Espina Jr. of Lakas–CMD.

== Representation history ==
| # | Image | Member | Term of office | | Congress | Party | Electoral history |
| # | Image | Member | Start | End | Congress | Party | Electoral history |
|---|---|---|---|---|---|---|---|
=== Biliran's at-large district for the House of Representatives of the Philippines ===
District created October 10, 1991 from Leyte's 3rd district.
| 1 | | Gerardo Espina Sr. | June 30, 1995 | June 30, 2004 | 10th | NPC | Elected in 1995. |
| 1 | | Gerardo Espina Sr. | June 30, 1995 | June 30, 2004 | 11th | NPC | Re-elected in 1998. |
| 1 | | Gerardo Espina Sr. | June 30, 1995 | June 30, 2004 | 12th | NPC | Re-elected in 2001. |
| 2 | | Gerardo Espina Jr. | June 30, 2004 | June 30, 2007 | 13th | KAMPI | Elected in 2004. |
| 3 | | Glenn Chong | June 30, 2007 | June 30, 2010 | 14th | Lakas | Elected in 2007. |
| 4 | | Rogelio Espina | June 30, 2010 | June 30, 2019 | 15th | Liberal | Elected in 2010. |
| 4 | | Rogelio Espina | June 30, 2010 | June 30, 2019 | 16th | Liberal | Re-elected in 2013. |
| 4 | | Rogelio Espina | June 30, 2010 | June 30, 2019 | 17th | Nacionalista | Re-elected in 2016. |
| (2) | | Gerardo Espina Jr. | June 30, 2019 | Incumbent | 18th | PDP–Laban | Elected in 2019. |
| (2) | | Gerardo Espina Jr. | June 30, 2019 | Incumbent | 19th | Lakas | Re-elected in 2022. |
| (2) | | Gerardo Espina Jr. | June 30, 2019 | Incumbent | 20th | Lakas | Re-elected in 2025. |

== Election results ==
=== 2025 ===
| Candidate | Party | Votes | % |
|---|---|---|---|
| Gerardo Espina Jr. (incumbent) | Lakas–CMD | 76,884 | 100.00 |
| Total | | 76,884 | 100.00 |
| Valid votes | | 76,884 | 74.22 |
| Invalid/blank votes | | 26,705 | 25.78 |
| Total votes | | 103,589 | 100.00 |
| Registered voters/turnout | | 124,191 | 83.41 |
| Lakas–CMD hold | | | |
Source: Commission on Elections

=== 2022 ===
2022 Philippine House of Representatives elections
| Party | Candidate | Votes | % |
|---|---|---|---|
| Lakas | Gerardo Espina Jr. | 73,565 | 89.21 |
| PROMDI | Edgardo Ambe | 8,900 | 10.79 |
| Total votes | | 82,465 | 100.00 |
| Lakas hold | | | |

=== 2019 ===
2019 Philippine House of Representatives elections
| Party | Candidate | Votes | % |
|---|---|---|---|
| PDP–Laban | Gerardo Espina Jr. | 46,772 | |
| PFP | Mulong Bernardes | 38,833 | |
| PDDS | John Jaguros | 760 | |
| Total votes | | | |
| Lakas gain from Nacionalista | | | |

=== 2016 ===
2016 Philippine House of Representatives elections
| Party | Candidate | Votes | % |
|---|---|---|---|
| Nacionalista | Rogelio Espina | 53,632 | 100.00 |
| Total votes | | 53,632 | 100.00 |
| Nacionalista hold | | | |

=== 2013 ===
2013 Philippine House of Representatives elections
| Party | Candidate | Votes | % |
|---|---|---|---|
| Liberal | Rogelio Espina | 46,072 | |
| PMP | Glenn Chong | 35,421 | |
| Independent | Totos Diu | 210 | |
| Total votes | | 81,703 | 100.00% |
| Liberal hold | | | |

== See also ==
- Legislative districts of Biliran
