= Cordon–Diffun–Maddela–Aurora Road =

Highway in Luzon, Philippines

Cordon–Diffun–Maddela–Aurora Road
- Cordon–Aurora Road; Cordon–Aurora Boundary Road; Maddela–Dinadiawan Road; Cordon–Diffun Road
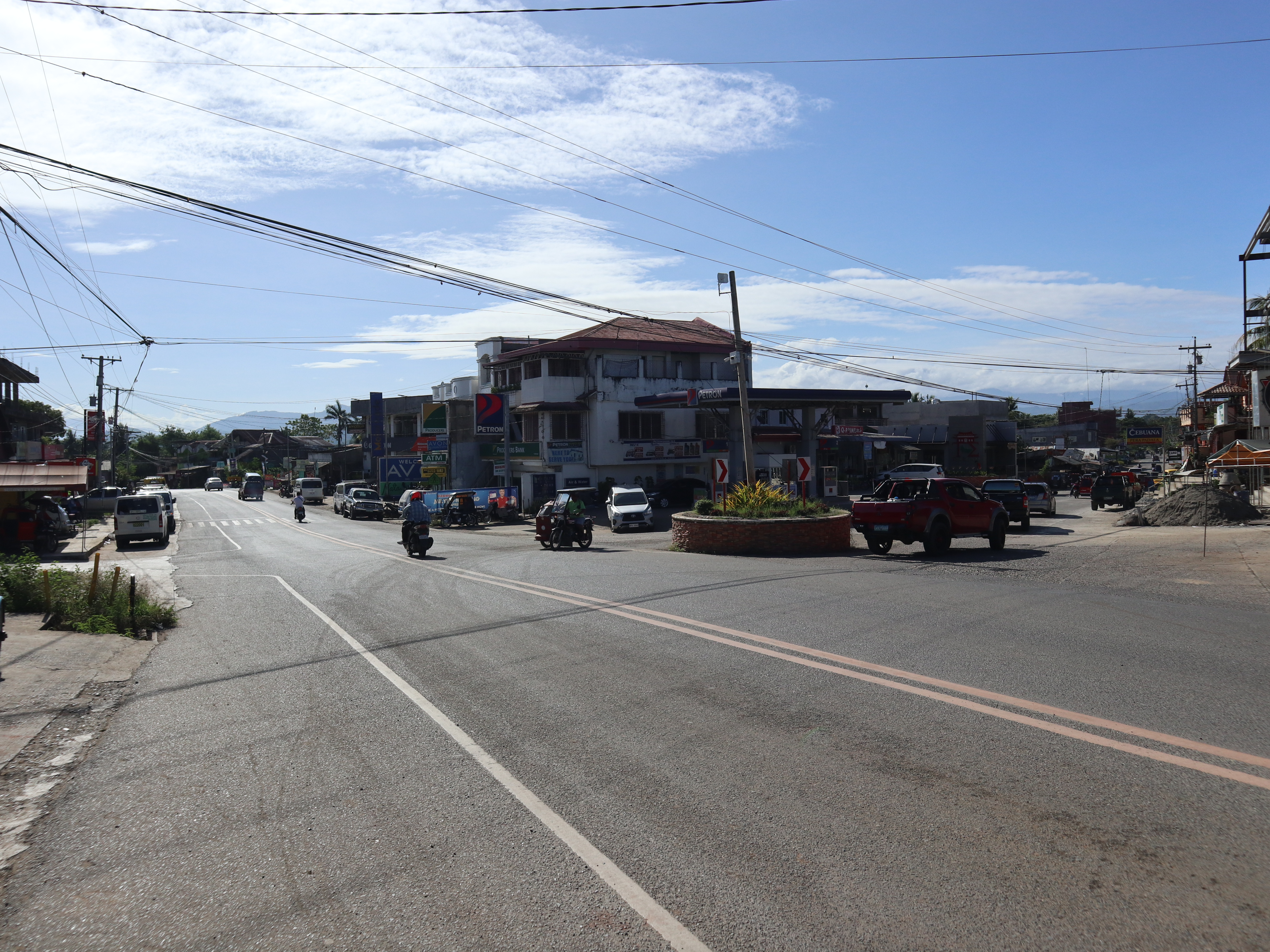
- The highway in Cabarroguis town proper

Route information
- Maintained by Department of Public Works and Highways
- Length: 109.72 km (68.18 mi)

Major junctions
- North end: AH26 (Pan-Philippine Highway) in Cordon
- South end: N112 (Baler–Casiguran Road) in Dipaculao

Location
- Country: Philippines
- Provinces: Isabela, Quirino, Aurora
- Towns: Cordon; Aglipay; Cabarroguis; Diffun; Maddela; Nagtipunan; Saguday; Dipaculao; Dinalungan

Highway system
- Roads in the Philippines; Highways; Expressways; List
← N107	→ N109

Cordon–Diffun–Maddela–Aurora Road or Cordon–Aurora Road signed as National Route 108 (N108) of the Philippine highway network, is a 109.72-kilometer (68.18 mi) national secondary road. It traverses the municipality of Cordon in the province of Isabela, all the municipalities in the province of Quirino (Diffun, Cabarroguis, Saguday, Aglipay, Maddela and Nagtipunan) and the municipality of Dipaculao in the province of Aurora.

== Route description ==
It serves as the only major road traversing the province of Quirino as well as connecting the province of Isabela to the province of Aurora.

The road starts in the town of Cordon, Isabela at the intersection with the Pan-Philippine Highway. It is locally known as the Cordon–Diffun Road.

It continue southwards into the province of Quirino in which it is locally known as Cordon–Aurora Boundary Road. It traverses through the town of Diffun and Cabarroguis into a junction with Cabarroguis–Santiago Road, it briefly passes through the town of Sagupay and continue to the town of Aglipay into a junction with Echague–Jones–Maddela Road in Maddela, it continues southwards into the town of Nagtipunan and into the province of Aurora.

The road continues to the town of Dinalungan in which it is locally known as Maddela–Dinadiawan Road and ends at the junction with Baler–Casiguran Road.

== Intersections ==
Intersections are numbered by kilometer posts, with Rizal Park in Manila designated as kilometer zero.

Province	City/Municipality	km	mi	Destinations	Notes
Isabela	Cordon			N1 (Maharlika Highway) – Manila, Tuguegarao, Cauayan, Ilagan	Northern terminus. Westbound to Manila via Nueva Vizcaya; eastbound towards Cagayan.
Quirino	Diffun			Maria Clara–Gabriela Silang Road	
Quirino	Diffun			Santiago–Diffun Road — Santiago	Bypasses Cordon town proper.
Quirino	Diffun			Liwayway Road	Road to Brgy. Liwayway in Diffun.
Quirino	Diffun			Diffun–Dumanisi–Magsaysay–Ifugao Village Road	
Quirino	Diffun			San Marcos–Ricarte Sur Road	
Quirino	Cabarroguis			San Marcos–Balagbag–Saguday Road — Saguday	
Quirino	Cabarroguis			Capitol Hills Road	Loops back to highway. Access to Quirino Provincial Capitol.
Quirino	Cabarroguis			Gundaway–Zamora Road / Antonio Luna Street / George Capinpin Street	Cabarroguis town proper.
Quirino	Cabarroguis			Benigno Aquino Boulevard (Gundaway–Burgos Road)	
Quirino	Cabarroguis			B. Cualo Road	
Quirino	Cabarroguis			NRJ Mangandingay–Saguday–Santiago Road — Saguday, Santiago	Alternate road bypassing Cabarroguis, Diffun and Cordon town propers.
Quirino	Saguday			Banuar–Dumabel Road	
Quirino	Saguday			Dibul–Gamis Road	
Quirino	Aglipay			Dalemdem–Pinaripad–Palacian Bypass Road	Northern end of bypass road.
Quirino	Aglipay			Pinaripad Sur–Disilwad Road	
Quirino	Aglipay			Dalemdem–Pinaripad–Palacian Bypass Road	Southern end of bypass road.
Quirino	Aglipay			Palacian–San Francisco Road	
Quirino	Aglipay			Victoria–San Francisco Road	
Quirino	Aglipay			Victoria–Maddela–Alicia–Kasibu Road	
Quirino	Maddela			Echague–Jones–Maddela Road — San Agustin, Jones, Echague	
Quirino	Maddela			NRJ–Villa Sur–San Pedro–Cabua-an–Ysmael–Disimungal Road	Northern end of road.
Quirino	Maddela			Dumabato–Balligui Road	
Quirino	Maddela			Cabaruan Road	Leads to Brgy. Cabaruan in Maddela.
Quirino	Nagtipunan			Maddela–Nagtipunan–Nueva Vizcaya Road	Leads inward to Nagtipunan municipality and ends at Dupax del Norte in Nueva Vizcaya.
Quirino	Nagtipunan			Sangbay–Anak Road	
Quirino	Nagtipunan			NRJ–Villa Sur–San Pedro–Cabua-an–Ysmael–Disimungal Road	Southern end of road.
Aurora	Dipaculao – Dinalungan boundary			No major junctions	
Aurora	Dipaculao			N112 (Baler–Casiguran Road) – Baler, Casiguran, Dilasag	Southern terminus.
1.000 mi = 1.609 km; 1.000 km = 0.621 mi: Unopened
