= List of barangays in Quirino =

The province of Quirino has 132 barangays comprising its 6 towns.

== Barangays ==
Most populous in its respective towns (as of 2010)

Barangay	Population					Town
Barangay	2010	2007	2000	1995	1990	Town
Abbag	811	735	638	540	629	Maddela
Aklan Village	863	836	687	638	416	Diffun
Alicia	1,295	1,059	1,157	1,195	1,108	Aglipay
Anak	1,604	1,475	1,086	990	862	Nagtipunan
Andres Bonifacio (Poblacion)	3,516	3,306	2,893	2,766	2,505	Diffun
Asaklat	1,210	1,093	1,101	761	–	Nagtipunan
Aurora East (Poblacion)	1,613	1,452	1,390	1,226	1,235	Diffun
Aurora West (Poblacion)	2,424	2,130	1,817	1,574	1,846	Diffun
Baguio Village	821	780	641	625	598	Diffun
Balagbag	1,664	1,507	1,449	1,446	1,362	Diffun
Balligui	1,743	2,008	1,654	1,347	1,555	Maddela
Bannawag	1,934	1,849	1,632	1,481	1,232	Diffun
Banuar	528	438	372	369	314	Cabarroguis
Buenavista	1,320	1,142	1,003	874	680	Maddela
Burgos	3,583	3,525	3,367	2,293	3,238	Cabarroguis
Cabaruan	1,603	1,191	1,270	1,258	1,191	Maddela
Cabua-an	923	601	730	662	577	Maddela
Cabugao	493	431	413	380	–	Aglipay
Cajel	1,865	1,841	1,511	1,389	1,342	Diffun
Calaocan	740	729	600	580	480	Cabarroguis
Campamento	1,588	1,249	1,361	1,258	660	Diffun
Cardenas	819	759	641	618	529	Saguday
Cofcaville	624	617	506	516	363	Maddela
Dagupan	1,036	997	905	981	957	Aglipay
Del Pilar	555	537	417	359	303	Cabarroguis
Dibibi	2,560	2,612	2,434	2,076	2,086	Cabarroguis
Dibul	1,254	1,247	1,268	979	999	Saguday
Diduyon	867	709	713	543	578	Maddela
Diego Silang	1,680	1,565	1,434	1,190	1,038	Diffun
Dingasan	1,189	1,157	1,036	987	882	Cabarroguis
Diodol	930	737	616	460	–	Aglipay
Dipantan	1,402	1,385	1,295	1,385	781	Nagtipunan
Dipintin	2,718	2,342	2,527	2,152	1,693	Maddela
Dissimungal	1,781	1,592	1,152	780	570	Nagtipunan
Divisoria Norte	528	514	480	430	357	Maddela
Divisoria Sur (Bisangal)	916	854	758	579	498	Maddela
Don Faustino Pagaduan	408	529	457	494	510	Diffun
Don Mariano Perez, Sr.	808	534	656	582	431	Diffun
Doña Imelda	597	504	502	392	372	Diffun
Dumabato Norte	1,319	1,200	1,196	1,194	1,224	Maddela
Dumabato Sur	876	1,200	1,188	1,088	1,100	Maddela
Dumabel	985	937	772	733	750	Aglipay
Dumanisi	1,670	1,489	1,305	1,247	1,029	Diffun
Dungo (Osmeña)	990	904	810	700	643	Aglipay
Eden	1,162	956	946	886	719	Cabarroguis
Gabriela Silang	1,972	1,807	1,746	1,730	1,487	Diffun
Gamis	866	590	487	429	358	Saguday
Gomez	538	505	467	418	359	Cabarroguis
Gregorio Pimentel	724	562	628	591	500	Diffun
Guinalbin	813	864	715	733	673	Aglipay
Guino (Giayan)	1,182	1,296	863	723	547	Nagtipunan
Gulac	1,598	1,345	1,384	1,288	1,157	Diffun
Gundaway (Poblacion)	3,884	3,586	3,401	3,032	2,662	Cabarroguis
Guribang	1,351	1,107	1,050	1,043	789	Diffun
Ifugao Village	1,185	1,116	1,087	1,012	657	Diffun
Isidro Paredes	1,653	1,404	1,259	1,184	1,016	Diffun
Jose Ancheta	904	896	688	565	–	Maddela
La Conwap (Guingin)	343	290	473	491	322	Nagtipunan
La Paz	2,700	2,418	2,136	1,876	1,641	Saguday
Landingan	1,689	1,484	1,160	746	507	Nagtipunan
Ligaya	1,588	1,470	1,143	1,020	947	Aglipay
Liwayway	2,471	1,910	2,237	1,972	1,828	Diffun
Lusod	2,020	1,959	1,803	1,502	1,219	Maddela
Luttuad	1,638	1,432	1,255	1,155	1,174	Diffun
Magsaysay	902	790	644	639	429	Diffun
Magsaysay (Poblacion)	2,694	2,518	2,128	1,909	1,569	Saguday
Makate	641	503	462	377	357	Diffun
Mangandingay (Poblacion)	3,404	3,292	3,018	2,845	2,969	Cabarroguis
Manglad	645	578	572	491	456	Maddela
Maria Clara	1,218	1,152	1,226	1,025	875	Diffun
Mataddi	448	458	509	302	179	Nagtipunan
Matmad	537	507	467	362	287	Nagtipunan
Nagabgaban	644	588	642	579	–	Aglipay
Old Gumiad	982	809	313	256	208	Nagtipunan
Palacian	1,768	1,870	1,543	1,341	1,650	Aglipay
Pedlisan	689	531	593	439	429	Maddela
Pinaripad Norte	1,084	1,008	958	891	–	Aglipay
Pinaripad Sur	1,200	1,022	1,080	971	1,828	Aglipay
Poblacion Norte	3,077	2,967	2,907	–	–	Maddela
Poblacion Sur	1,949	1,942	1,806	3,036	2,374	Maddela
Ponggo	3,006	2,793	2,162	1,555	1,217	Nagtipunan
Progreso (Poblacion)	1,204	1,225	1,059	1,071	976	Aglipay
Rafael Palma (Don Sergio Osmeña)	698	652	648	663	480	Diffun
Ramos	757	775	638	589	454	Aglipay
Rang-ayan	211	206	135	150	87	Aglipay
Ricarte Norte	1,497	1,280	1,237	1,041	979	Diffun
Ricarte Sur	657	564	565	454	412	Diffun
Rizal (Poblacion)	3,060	3,201	2,565	2,333	1,765	Diffun
Rizal (Poblacion)	2,849	2,847	2,606	2,317	2,254	Saguday
Salvacion	1,311	1,222	1,192	1,058	1,070	Saguday
San Antonio	513	506	515	460	425	Aglipay
San Antonio	2,001	1,183	1,040	897	821	Diffun
San Benigno	1,141	970	950	840	–	Aglipay
San Bernabe	885	836	710	670	660	Maddela
San Dionisio I	576	611	761	615	611	Maddela
San Dionisio II	3,571	3,411	3,068	1,488	1,762	Nagtipunan
San Francisco	1,713	1,661	1,526	1,525	1,206	Aglipay
San Isidro	1,829	1,573	1,269	1,047	922	Diffun
San Leonardo (Cabarroguis)	1,937	2,039	1,562	1,489	1,484	Aglipay
San Manuel	851	845	589	318	–	Aglipay
San Marcos	2,276	2,233	1,940	1,773	1,576	Cabarroguis
San Martin	1,221	847	907	857	790	Maddela
San Pascual	639	624	464	471	416	Diffun
San Pedro	1,106	986	880	829	769	Maddela
San Pugo	552	497	433	333	258	Nagtipunan
San Ramon	725	717	648	621	498	Aglipay
San Ramos	986	806	629	531	515	Nagtipunan
San Salvador	414	405	294	243	217	Maddela
Sangbay	1,855	1,691	1,636	1,446	1,151	Nagtipunan
Santa Maria	556	544	449	352	–	Maddela
Santo Domingo	642	593	671	378	397	Cabarroguis
Santo Niño	862	966	955	819	852	Maddela
Santo Tomas	508	534	412	390	362	Maddela
Santo Tomas	1,267	1,085	1,014	1,005	893	Saguday
Tres Reyes	836	793	745	709	605	Saguday
Tucod	1,586	1,462	1,458	1,498	1,234	Cabarroguis
Victoria	1,208	1,257	829	750	642	Aglipay
Villa Agullana	450	484	550	478	471	Maddela
Villa Gracia	878	909	993	836	799	Maddela
Villa Hermosa Norte	1,560	1,444	1,437	1,306	1,255	Maddela
Villa Hermosa Sur	2,041	2,018	1,835	1,551	1,331	Maddela
Villa Jose V Ylanan	524	484	427	324	326	Maddela
Villa Pagaduan	931	842	737	727	923	Aglipay
Villa Pascua	1,316	1,182	988	818	626	Diffun
Villa Peña (Capellangan)	671	615	634	578	467	Cabarroguis
Villa Santiago	1,474	1,543	1,329	1,231	1,176	Aglipay
Villa Ventura	696	596	503	450	–	Aglipay
Villamor	2,272	2,149	2,173	2,007	1,696	Cabarroguis
Villarose	723	606	507	358	450	Cabarroguis
Wasid	1,325	856	680	360	294	Nagtipunan
Ysmael	521	583	–	–	–	Maddela
Zamora	3,082	3,029	2,391	2,375	1,961	Cabarroguis
Barangay	2010	2007	2000	1995	1990	Municipality
*Italicized names are former names.; *Dashes (–) in cells indicate unavailable census data.

[top]
