= 1971 Quirino provincial creation plebiscite =

1971 Quirino creation plebiscite
- November 8, 1971

Results
Choice	Votes	%
Yes	3,244	92.71%
No	255	7.29%
Total votes	3,499	100.00%

The 1971 Quirino provincial creation plebiscite was a plebiscite on the separation of the sub-province of Quirino from the province of Nueva Vizcaya in order to become its own province as stipulated in Republic Act No. 6394 that was passed on September 10, 1971.

The plebiscite was held on November 8, 1971, and the results were announced on February 22, 1972.

== Results ==
=== Summary ===
Choice	Votes	%
For	3,244	92.71
Against	255	7.29
Total	3,499	100.00
Source: Government Printing Office

==== By municipality ====
Municipality	Yes	No
Aglipay	800	75
Cabarroguis	676	25
Diffun	1,126	88
Maddela	463	36
Saguday	181	31
Total	3,244	255
Source: Government Printing Office
