= 1971 Philippine Senate election =

22nd Philippine senatorial election

- November 8, 1971

8 (of the 24) seats in the Senate 13 seats needed for a majority
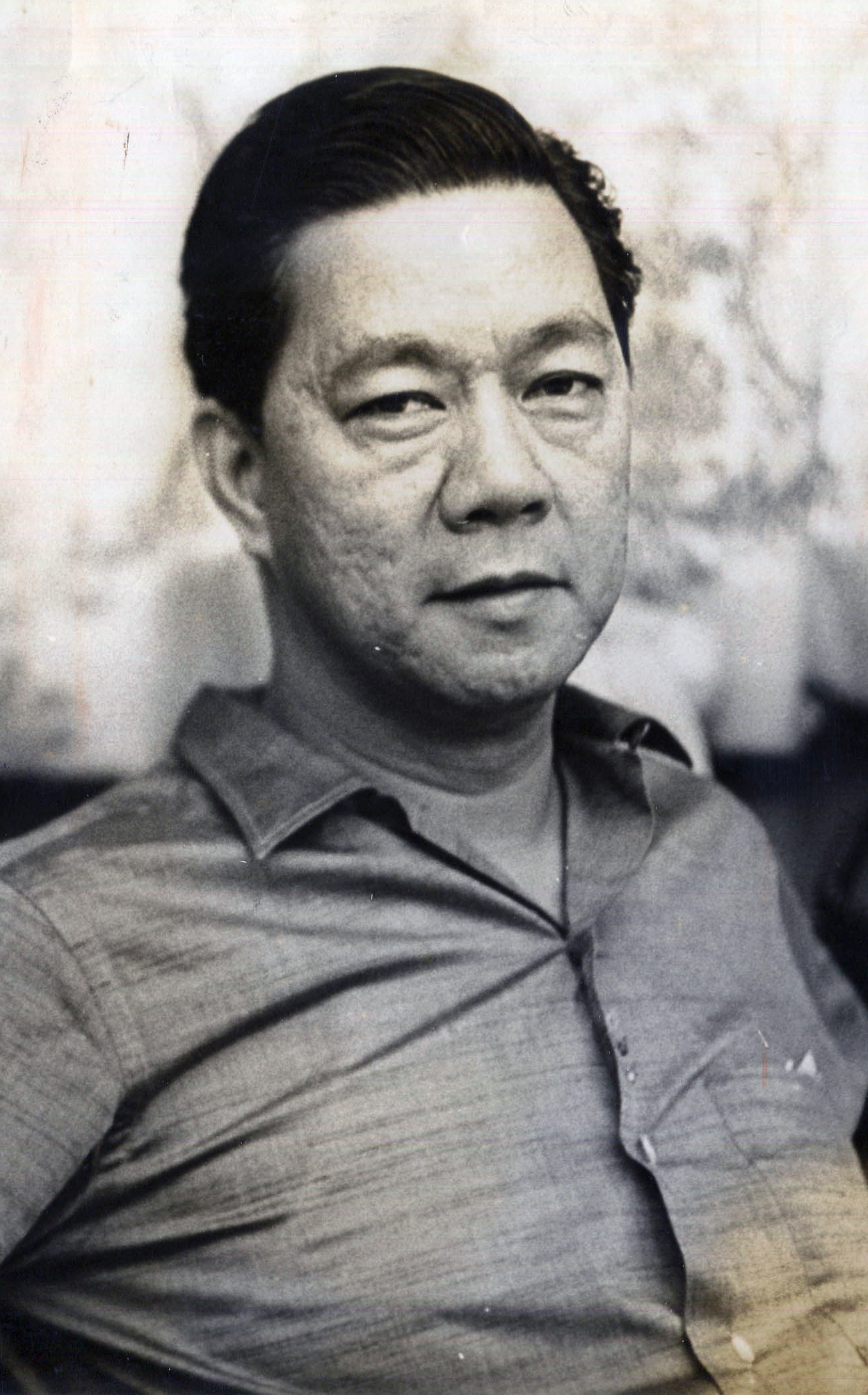

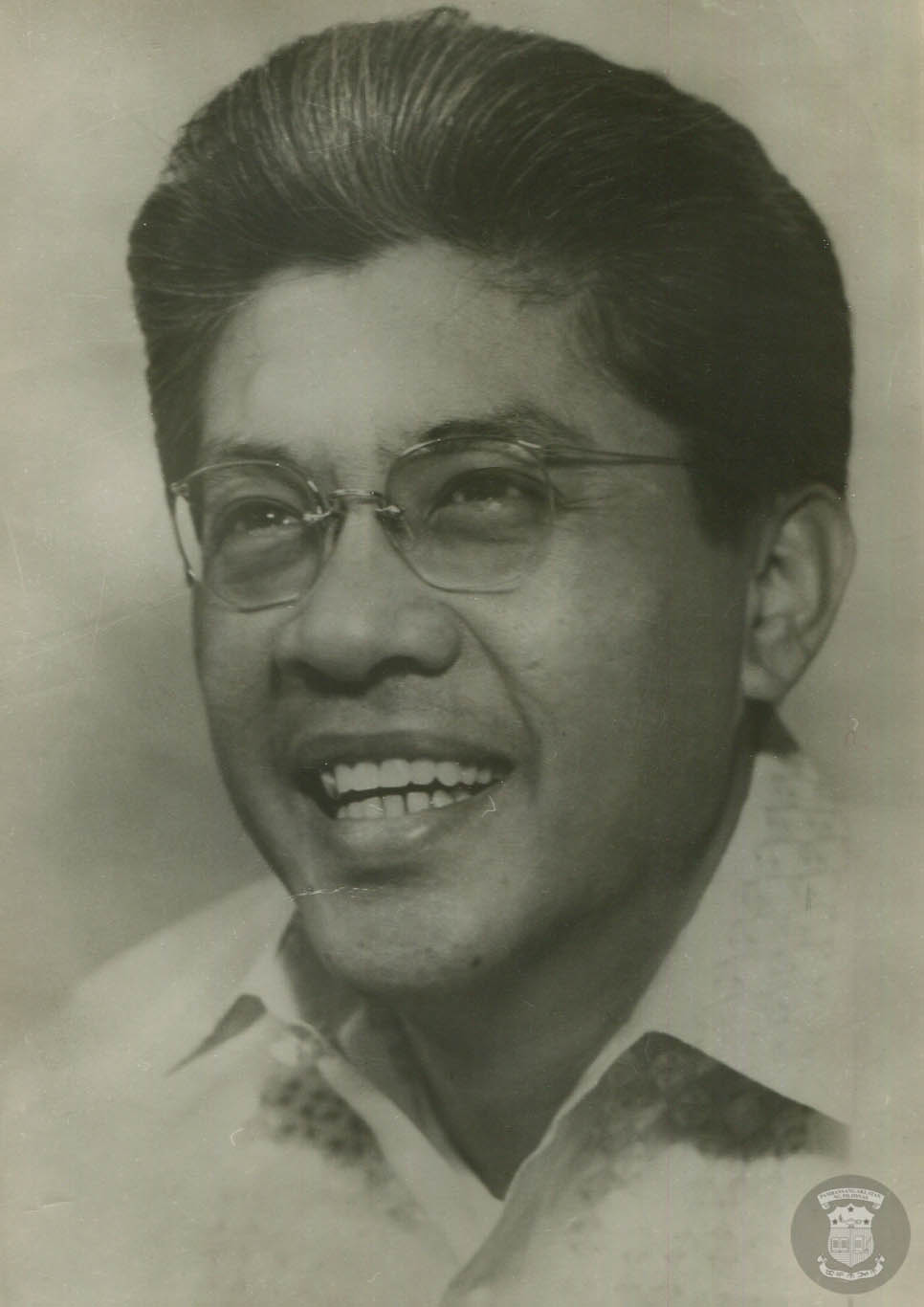
	Majority party	Minority party
Leader	Gil Puyat	Gerardo Roxas
Party	Nacionalista	Liberal
Seats before	17 (4 up)	6 (3 up)
Seats won	3	5
Seats after	16	8
Seat change	▼1	▲2
Popular vote	24,819,175	33,469,677
Percentage	42.56	57.41
Swing	▼16.00	▲16.07
Senate President before election
Gil Puyat
Nacionalista
Elected Senate President
Gil Puyat
Nacionalista

The 22nd election of members to the Senate of the Philippines was held on November 8, 1971. The opposition Liberal Party won five seats in the Philippine Senate while three seats were won by the Nacionalista Party, the administration party; this was seen as a consequence of the Plaza Miranda bombing (three months prior on August 21), which wounded all of the Liberal Party's candidates and almost took the lives of John Henry Osmeña and Jovito Salonga. Their terms as senators were cut short as a result of the declaration of martial law by President Ferdinand Marcos on September 23, 1972.

Due to the ratification of a new constitution in 1973, the Senate was abolished and the unicameral parliamentary Batasang Pambansa was instituted. In 1987, a new constitution was approved that reverted to the presidential and bicameral legislative system. This means that this would be the last election for the Senate until the 1987 election.

== Electoral system ==
Philippine Senate elections are held via plurality block voting with staggered elections, with the country as an at-large district. The Senate has 24 seats, of which 8 seats are up every 2 years. The eight seats up were last contested in 1965; each voter has eight votes and can vote up to eight names, of which the eight candidates with the most votes winning the election.

== Retiring incumbents ==
1. Wenceslao Lagumbay (Nacionalista), ran for governor of Laguna in 1980 and lost, ran for member of parliament from Laguna's at-large district in 1984 and won
2. Sergio Osmeña Jr. (Liberal), retired from politics
3. Lorenzo Tañada (NCP), retired from electoral politics

== Results ==
The Liberal Party won five seats, while the Nacionalista Party won three.

Two Liberal incumbents successfully defended their seats: Genaro Magsaysay and Jovito Salonga, while Alejandro Almendras and Eva Estrada Kalaw of the Nacionalistas successfully defended their seats, as well.

The other four winners are neophyte senators: Eddie Ilarde, Ramon Mitra Jr., and John Henry Osmeña of the Liberals, and Ernesto Maceda of the Nacionalistas.

Nacionalista Senator Dominador Aytona lost his reelection bid.

	1	2	3	4	5	6	7	8	9	10	11	12	13	14	15	16	17	18	19	20	21	22	23	24
Before election				‡	‡	‡	‡	‡	‡	‡	‡													
Election result	Not up			LP					NP			Not up												
After election				√	√	*	+	+	*	*	*													

Key:

- ‡ Seats up
- + Gained by a party from another party
- √ Held by the incumbent
- * Held by the same party with a new senator

=== Per candidate ===
Candidate	Party	Votes	%
Jovito Salonga	Liberal Party	5,620,272	59.67
Genaro Magsaysay	Liberal Party	4,756,376	50.49
John Henry Osmeña	Liberal Party	4,668,092	49.56
Eddie Ilarde	Liberal Party	4,548,069	48.28
Eva Estrada-Kalaw	Nacionalista Party (Note: Guest candidate of the Liberal Party)	4,464,367	47.39
Ramon Mitra Jr.	Liberal Party	3,916,833	41.58
Ernesto Maceda	Nacionalista Party	3,592,559	38.14
Alejandro Almendras	Nacionalista Party	3,427,985	36.39
Manuel Elizalde	Nacionalista Party	3,407,276	36.17
Melanio Singson	Liberal Party	3,130,332	33.23
Dominador Aytona	Nacionalista Party	3,119,995	33.12
Juan Ponce Enrile	Nacionalista Party	3,044,461	32.32
Salipada Pendatun	Liberal Party	2,885,336	30.63
Blas Ople	Nacionalista Party	2,654,067	28.18
Leonila Garcia	Nacionalista Party	2,473,684	26.26
Cipriano Primicias Jr.	Nacionalista Party	2,099,148	22.28
Total		57,808,852	100.00
Total votes		9,419,568	–
Registered voters/turnout		11,661,909	80.77

=== Per party ===
Party	Votes	%	+/–	Seats				
Party	Votes	%	+/–	Up	Before	Won	After	+/−
Liberal Party	33,469,677	57.42	+16.07	3	6	5	8	+2
Nacionalista Party	24,819,175	42.58	−16.00	4	17	3	16	−1
Nationalist Citizens' Party				1	1	0	0	−1
Total	58,288,852	100.00	–	8	24	8	24	0
Total votes	9,419,568	–						
Registered voters/turnout	11,661,909	80.77						

Vote share
LP	57.42%
NP	42.58%

Senate seats
LP	62.50%
NP	37.50%

== Defeated incumbents ==
1. Dominador Aytona (Nacionalista), retired from politics

== See also ==
- Also held on this day:
  - 1971 Philippine local elections
  - 1971 Siquijor creation plebiscite
  - 1971 Quirino provincial creation plebiscite
  - Incorporation plebiscites for:
    - Carmen, Surigao del Sur
    - Dupex del Sur, Nueva Vizcaya
    - Pines, Misamis Occidental
  - Renaming plebiscite for Olongapo, to be renamed as "Pres. Magsaysay City"
- Commission on Elections
- 7th Congress of the Philippines
