= Aglipay =

Aglipay may refer to the following:

- Aglipay, Quirino, a municipality in the Philippines
- Gregorio Aglipay, co-founder of the Philippine Independent Church, also known as the "Aglipayan Church"

== See also ==
- Philippine Independent Church
