= Nagtipunan =

Municipality in Quirino, Philippines

- Municipality
- Municipality of Nagtipunan
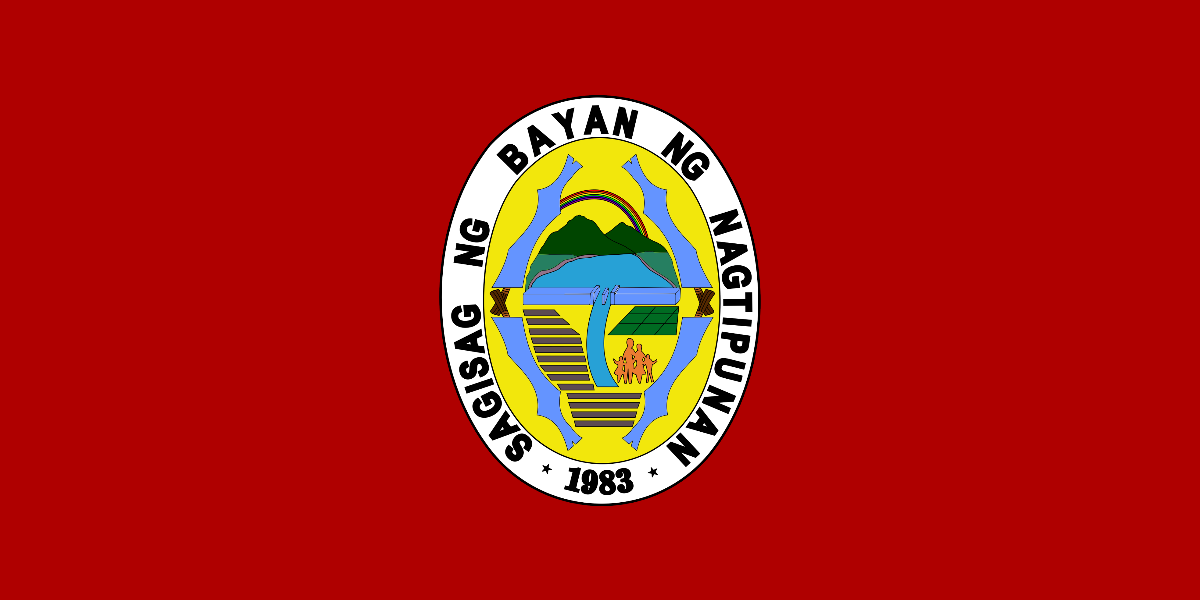
- Flag Seal

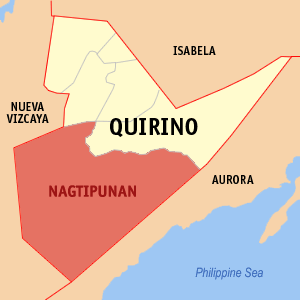
- Map of Quirino with Nagtipunan highlighted
- Interactive map of Nagtipunan
- Location within the Philippines
- Coordinates: 16°13′N 121°36′E
- Country: Philippines
- Region: Cagayan Valley
- Province: Quirino
- District: Lone district
- Founded: September 24, 1983
- Barangays: 16 (see Barangays)

Government
  - Type: Sangguniang Bayan
  - Mayor: Noel Tataro Lim
  - Vice Mayor: Arnel R. Fiesta
  - Representative: Midy N. Cua
  - Municipal Council: Members: Melanie M. Batara; Edmund K. Suguitan; Benjamin P. Duldulao Jr.; Ruben D. Pugong; HUbert P. Buhong; Jessie S. Tigas; Carlito M. Tabon; Roly A. Cumlat
  - Electorate: 17,227 voters (2022)

Area
  - Total: 1,607.40 km^{2} (620.62 sq mi)
- Elevation: 409 m (1,342 ft)
- Highest elevation: 1,246 m (4,088 ft)
- Lowest elevation: 168 m (551 ft)

Population (2024 census)
  - Total: 26,541
  - Density: 16.512/km^{2} (42.765/sq mi)
  - Households: 5,754

Economy
  - Income class: 1st municipal income class
  - Poverty incidence: 15.96% (2023)
  - Revenue: ₱ 653.3 million (2024)
  - Assets: ₱ 1,516 million (2024)
  - Expenditure: ₱ 440.5 million (2024)
  - Liabilities: ₱ 119 million (2024)

Service provider
  - Electricity: Quirino Electric Cooperative (QUIRELCO)
- Time zone: UTC+8 (PST)
- ZIP code: 3405
- PSGC: 0205706000
- IDD : area code: +63 (0)78
- Native languages: Ilocano; Bugkalot; Nagtipunan Agta; Arta; Tagalog
- Website: www.nagtipunan-quirino.gov.ph

Nagtipunan, officially the Municipality of Nagtipunan (Ilocano: Ili ti Nagtipunan; Tagalog: Bayan ng Nagtipunan), is a municipality in the province of Quirino, Philippines. According to the 2024 census, it has a population of 26,541 people.

The municipality is known as the "Tourism Capital of Quirino" primarily for its natural environment.

== Etymology ==
The town's name was derived from the native word nagtipunan meaning “convergence point,” in reference to several major tributaries of the Cagayan River in Aurora, Nueva Vizcaya and Qurino meeting at points within this area.

== History ==
The Municipality of Nagtipunan was formerly a part of Maddela. It was created on February 25, 1983, by virtue of Batas Pambansa No. 345 and approved in a plebiscite held on September 24, 1983.

== Geography ==
Nagtipunan is the largest town in terms of land area in Quirino and the entire Luzon island. As the second largest municipality in the Philippines, it occupies a land area of 1,607.40 square kilometers, nearly half of the province itself. It is between the provinces of Nueva Vizcaya and Aurora.

Nagtipunan is 52.35 kilometres (32.53 mi) from the provincial capital Cabarroguis, and 329.59 kilometres (204.80 mi) from the country's capital city of Manila.

=== Barangays ===
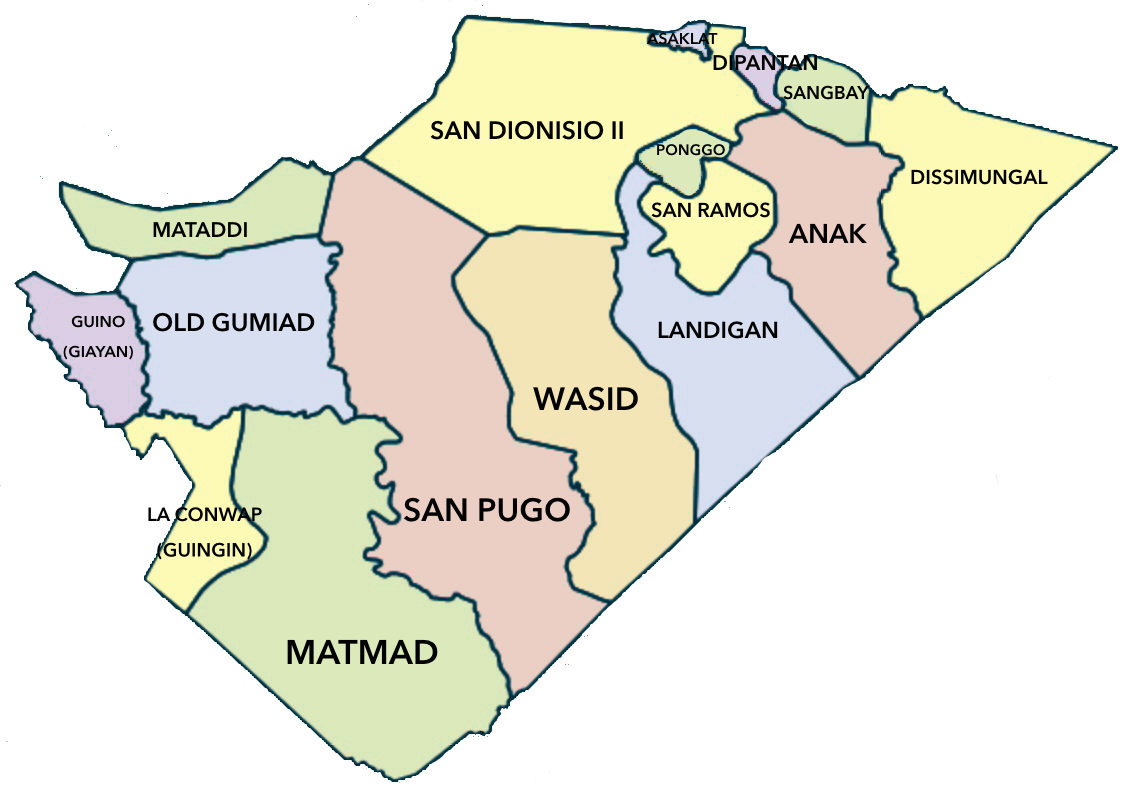
Barangay map of Nagtipunan

Nagtipunan is politically subdivided into 16 barangays. Each barangay consists of puroks and some have sitios.

- Anak
- Asaklat
- Dipantan
- Dissimungal
- Guino (Giayan)
- La Conwap (Guingin)
- Landingan
- Mataddi
- Matmad
- Old Gumiad
- Ponggo (Urban)
- San Dionisio II
- San Pugo
- San Ramos
- Sangbay
- Wasid

=== Climate ===
Climate data for Nagtipunan, Quirino
Month	Jan	Feb	Mar	Apr	May	Jun	Jul	Aug	Sep	Oct	Nov	Dec	Year
Mean daily maximum °C (°F)	25 (77)	27 (81)	29 (84)	31 (88)	31 (88)	30 (86)	29 (84)	29 (84)	29 (84)	29 (84)	28 (82)	26 (79)	29 (83)
Mean daily minimum °C (°F)	20 (68)	20 (68)	21 (70)	23 (73)	24 (75)	24 (75)	24 (75)	24 (75)	24 (75)	23 (73)	22 (72)	20 (68)	22 (72)
Average precipitation mm (inches)	89 (3.5)	72 (2.8)	54 (2.1)	61 (2.4)	202 (8.0)	224 (8.8)	263 (10.4)	278 (10.9)	270 (10.6)	192 (7.6)	129 (5.1)	159 (6.3)	1,993 (78.5)
Average rainy days	17.8	14.5	13.5	14.1	22.9	25.6	27.4	26.2	25.3	20.4	17.9	20.3	245.9
Source: Meteoblue

== Demographics ==
Population census of Nagtipunan
Year	Pop.	±% p.a.
1990	9,460	—
1995	12,509	+5.37%
2000	12,217	−0.51%
2007	20,443	+7.36%
2010	22,473	+3.51%
2015	23,484	+0.84%
2020	25,399	+1.66%
2024	26,541	+1.06%
Source: Philippine Statistics Authority

== Economy ==
Poverty incidence of Nagtipunan (%)

Source: Philippine Statistics Authority

=== Tourism ===
Natural attractions include:

- The Cagayan River, one of the cleanest bodies of water in the Philippines, which flows from Barangay San Pugo down to Barangay Ponggo where Tatimbang, Apang, Aguk, Bimmapor and Puctad are found.
- The 50-metre (160 ft) high Mactol Falls, in Barangay San Pugo, is the Cagayan River headwater. It is located 22 kilometres (14 mi) from Pongo (a 2.5-hr. drive) and has a 22 metres (72 ft) deep basin surrounded by rock formations and a forest. It used for swimming and picnicking.
- Also found in Nagtipunan is the “Bimmapor,” a rock formation similar to a sunken ship, of which only the upper decks are protruding from the ground.
- The Pusuac cave and watershed in Barangay Ponggo

== Government ==
=== Local government ===
Nagtipunan is part of the lone congressional district of the province of Quirino. It is governed by a mayor, designated as its local chief executive, and by a municipal council as its legislative body in accordance with the Local Government Code. The mayor, vice mayor, and the municipal councilors are elected directly in polls held every three years.

=== Elected officials ===
Members of the Municipal Council (2022–2025)
Position	Name
Congressman	Midy N. Cua
Mayor	Noel T. LIM
Vice-mayor	Arnel R. Fiesta
Councilors	Melanie M. Batara
Councilors	Edmund K. Suguitan
Councilors	Benjamin P. Duldulao Jr.
Councilors	Ruben D. Pugong
Councilors	Hubert P. Buhong
Councilors	Jessie S. Tigas
Councilors	Carlito M. Tabon
Councilors	Roly A. Cumlat

== Education ==
The Schools Division of Quirino governs the town's public education system. The division office is a field office of the DepEd in Cagayan Valley region. The Nagtipunan Schools District Office governs the public and private elementary and high schools throughout the municipality.

=== Primary and elementary schools ===
- Anak Integrated School (elementary)
- Asaclat Elementary School
- Bugkalot Elementary School
- Comgang Elementary School
- Dicuraban Elementary School
- Didang Primary School
- Dioryong Integrated School (elementary)
- Dipantan Elementary School
- Disimungal Integrated School (elementary)
- Giayan Integrated School (elementary)
- Kakidugen Elementary School
- Keat Elementary School
- Kimmabayo Integrated School (elementary)
- La Conwap Elementary School
- Landingan Integrated School (elementary)
- Macabo Elementary School
- Mainget Primary School
- Mataddi Elementary School
- Matmad Integrated School (elementary)
- Nagtipunan Central School Integrated SPED Center (elementary)
- Pulang Lupa Elementary School
- San Pugo Elementary School
- San Ramos Elementary School
- Sangbay Integrated School (elementary)
- Scala Integrated School (elementary)
- Tabiis Primary School
- Tamsi Elementary School
- Tangliyao Primary School
- Tapaw Elementary School
- Tilitilan Primary School
- Wasid Integrated School (elementary)

=== Secondary schools ===
- Anak Integrated School
- Dioryong Integrated School
- Disimungal Integrated School
- Giayan Integrated School
- Kimmabayo Integrated School
- Landingan Integrated School
- Matmad Integrated School
- Nagtipunan Central School Integrated SPED Center
- Nagtipunan National High School
- Sangbay Integrated School
- Scala Integrated School
- Wasid Integrated School
