= Quirino State University =

Public university in Quirino, Philippines

- Pamantasang Pampamahalaan ng Quirino (Filipino)
- Former names: Northeastern Nueva Vizcaya High School (1963–1964); Northern Nueva Vizcaya National Agricultural School (1964–1972); Quirino National Agricultural School (1972–1983); Quirino State College (1983–2012)
- Motto in English: A Bastion of Higher Learning in Northern Luzon
- Type: State University
- Established: 1963; 63 years ago
- Academic affiliations: SCUAA; PASUC
- President: Dr. Hermenegildo F. Samoy, Jr.
- Location: Diffun, Quirino, Philippines; 16°36′03″N 121°30′24″E
- Website: www.qsu.edu.ph
- Location in Luzon Location in Philippines

Quirino State University (QSU), formerly Quirino State College, is a public university in the province of Quirino, Philippines. Its main campus is located in Diffun; other campuses are located in Maddela and Cabarroguis. It is an important center of higher learning in Quirino province.

== General mandate ==
The state university is mandated to provide higher technological, professional, and vocational instruction and training in science, agricultural and industrial fields, as well as short-term technical and vocational courses. The university promotes research, advanced studies, and progressive leadership in its areas of specialization. Its main campus is located in Diffun.

== Campuses ==
- Cabarroguis
- Diffun
- Maddela
