= Saguday =

Municipality in Quirino, Philippines

- Municipality
- Municipality of Saguday
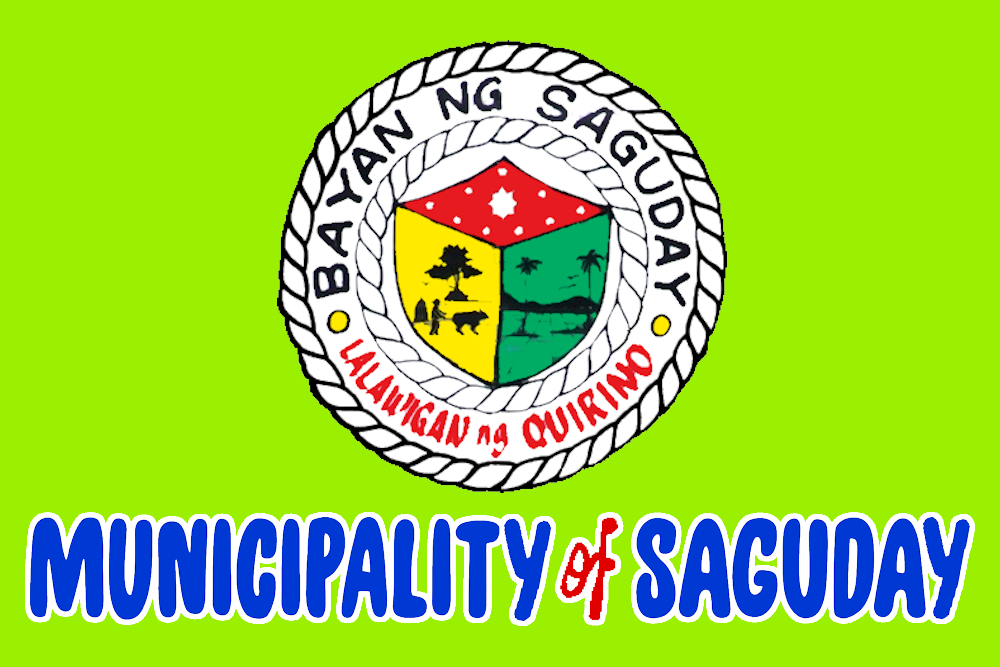
- Flag Seal

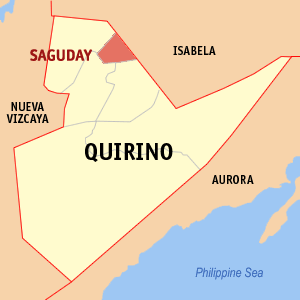
- Map of Quirino with Saguday highlighted
- Interactive map of Saguday
- Location within the Philippines
- Coordinates: 16°32′22″N 121°33′49″E
- Country: Philippines
- Region: Cagayan Valley
- Province: Quirino
- District: Lone district
- Founded: June 21, 1959
- Barangays: 9 (see Barangays)

Government
  - Type: Sangguniang Bayan
  - Mayor: Sassa Girl
  - Vice Mayor: Ric B. Cadiente
  - Representative: Junie E. Cua
  - Municipal Council: Members: Diolison A. Vicmundo; Frederick E. Canto; Erickson Noel S. Lopez; Cielito B. Gumiran; Leopoldo P. Graganta Jr.; Lorenzo G. Salviejo; Jaime V. Lucas; Leticia S. Barcelona
  - Electorate: 11,196 voters (2025)

Area
  - Total: 55.50 km^{2} (21.43 sq mi)
- Elevation: 110 m (360 ft)
- Highest elevation: 191 m (627 ft)
- Lowest elevation: 87 m (285 ft)

Population (2024 census)
  - Total: 17,863
  - Density: 321.9/km^{2} (833.6/sq mi)
  - Households: 4,251

Economy
  - Income class: 4th municipal income class
  - Poverty incidence: 8.92% (2023)
  - Revenue: ₱ 124.8 million (2024)
  - Assets: ₱ 182.9 million (2024)
  - Expenditure: ₱ 127.1 million (2024)
  - Liabilities: ₱ 41.45 million (2024)

Service provider
  - Electricity: Quirino Electric Cooperative (QUIRELCO)
- Time zone: UTC+8 (PST)
- ZIP code: 3402
- PSGC: 0205705000
- IDD : area code: +63 (0)78
- Native languages: Ilocano; Bugkalot; Tagalog
- Website: www.saguday-quirino.gov.ph

Saguday, officially the Municipality of Saguday (Ilocano: Ili ti Saguday; Tagalog: Bayan ng Saguday), is a municipality in the province of Quirino, Philippines. According to the 2024 census, it has a population of 17,863 people.

== Etymology ==
The naming of Saguday was done by Jose Cardenas of San Jose, Nueva Ecija, the grandfather of former Mayor Leandro G. Cardenas who came to visit his relatives in Saguday. The word Saguday is an Ilocano term which means, "one who possesses good traits and is blessed with a clean mind, heart, and soul."

== History ==
Saguday was formally founded on June 21, 1959 as a regular municipality of Nueva Vizcaya by virtue of House Bill No. 2541, authored by Leonardo B. Perez, then Congressman of the Lone District of Nueva Vizcaya which pursuant to the provisions of Article VI, Section 20 (1) of the Philippine Constitution, became a law without the signature of President Carlos P. Garcia, entitled Republic Act No. 2519. Pursuant to Section 1 of this law, the seven barrios composing the Municipality of Saguday were as follows: La Paz, Saguday (now Rizal and Magsaysay), Salvacion, Santo Tomas which were separated from the Municipality of Diffun; while Dibul, Mangandingay and Tres Reyes were separated from the Municipality of Aglipay.

Originally, Saguday was a barrio of the Municipality of Santiago, Isabela, however, upon the final settlement of the boundary dispute between Isabela and Nueva Vizcaya, Saguday became a regular barrio of Diffun by virtue of an Executive Order No. 386, issued by then President Elpidio Quirino.

The first settlers of Saguday were spearheaded by Ilocanos, composed of the families of Corpuz, Cortez, Cabiles, Guzman and Bacani who hailed from the Province of Pangasinan, the Pagbilao, Guillermo and Olonan families from Ilocos Region, and the families of Cardenas, and Tomas from the Province of Nueva Ecija, who all came to benefit from the lands and forest of this valley.

On August 16, 1959, the founding set of local officials to govern the town appointed by President Garcia assumed office, with Luis C. Lucas, Sr. as the Mayor, while Nicanor Pagbilao as the Vice Mayor.

Saguday was initially a municipality. Barangay Cardenas was created in 1980 pursuant to Sangguniang Bayan Resolution No. 02, while Barangay Gamis was founded in 1981, pursuant to Resolution No. 05. At present, Saguday is a 5th Class Municipality due to its limited income which is attributed to scarce resources.

Upon the creation of the Municipality of Saguday, the urban core was divided into two barrios: District I now Barangay Magsaysay has been the seat of the Municipal Government from then up to present, and District II now Barangay Rizal.

== Geography ==
Saguday is situated 5.75 kilometres (3.57 mi) from the provincial capital Cabarroguis, and 372.43 kilometres (231.42 mi) from the country's capital city of Manila.

=== Barangays ===
Saguday is politically subdivided into 9 barangays. Each barangay consists of puroks and some have sitios.

- Cardenas
- Dibul
- Gamis
- La Paz
- Magsaysay (Poblacion)
- Rizal (Poblacion)
- Salvacion
- Sto. Tomas
- Tres Reyes

=== Climate ===
Climate data for Saguday, Quirino
Month	Jan	Feb	Mar	Apr	May	Jun	Jul	Aug	Sep	Oct	Nov	Dec	Year
Mean daily maximum °C (°F)	25 (77)	27 (81)	29 (84)	32 (90)	32 (90)	31 (88)	31 (88)	30 (86)	30 (86)	29 (84)	27 (81)	25 (77)	29 (84)
Mean daily minimum °C (°F)	20 (68)	20 (68)	21 (70)	23 (73)	24 (75)	24 (75)	24 (75)	24 (75)	24 (75)	23 (73)	22 (72)	21 (70)	23 (72)
Average precipitation mm (inches)	119 (4.7)	83 (3.3)	54 (2.1)	37 (1.5)	133 (5.2)	132 (5.2)	161 (6.3)	163 (6.4)	153 (6.0)	142 (5.6)	160 (6.3)	224 (8.8)	1,561 (61.4)
Average rainy days	18.4	13.6	11.6	9.4	19.3	21.9	23.9	23.4	21.1	16.3	18.1	21.4	218.4
Source: Meteoblue

== Demographics ==
Population census of Saguday
Year	Pop.	±% p.a.
1960	3,264	—
1970	4,866	+4.07%
1975	5,935	+4.06%
1980	6,673	+2.37%
1990	9,918	+4.04%
1995	10,900	+1.78%
2000	17,027	+10.03%
2007	13,479	−3.17%
2010	14,596	+2.94%
2015	16,070	+1.85%
2020	17,137	+1.36%
2024	17,863	+1.00%
Source: Philippine Statistics Authority

== Economy ==
Poverty incidence of Saguday (%)

Source: Philippine Statistics Authority

== Government ==
=== Local government ===
Saguday is part of the lone congressional district of the province of Quirino. It is governed by a mayor, designated as its local chief executive, and by a municipal council as its legislative body in accordance with the Local Government Code. The mayor, vice mayor, and the municipal councilors are elected directly in polls held every three years.

=== Elected officials ===
Members of the Municipal Council (2019–2022)
Position	Name
Congressman	Midy N. Cua
Mayor	Jerry M. Pagbilao
Vice-Mayor	Ric B. Cadiente
Councilors	Julius Cardenas
Councilors	Leticia S. Barcelona
Councilors	Frederick Canto
Councilors	Erickson Noel S. Lopez
Councilors	Denis Brillantes
Councilors	Cielito B. Gumiran
Councilors	Oscar H. Pinalgan
Councilors	Richard Tesoro

== Education ==
The Schools Division of Quirino governs the town's public education system. The division office is a field office of the DepEd in Cagayan Valley region. The Saguday Schools District Office governs all the public and private elementary and high schools throughout the municipality.

=== Primary and elementary schools ===
- Cardenas Elementary School
- Dibul Elementary School
- Gamis Elementary School
- Heavenly Gift Learning Center of Saguday
- La Paz Elementary School
- La Paz Elementary School Extension Annex
- Lighthouse Christian School
- Lumagui Elementary School
- Magsaysay Elementary School
- Saguday Central School
- Saguday United Methodist School
- Salvacion Integrated School (Elementary)
- Sto. Tomas Elementary School
- Tres Reyes Elementary School

=== Secondary schools ===
- Saguday National High School
- Salvacion Integrated School
