= Diffun =

Municipality in Quirino, Philippines

- Municipality
- Municipality of Diffun
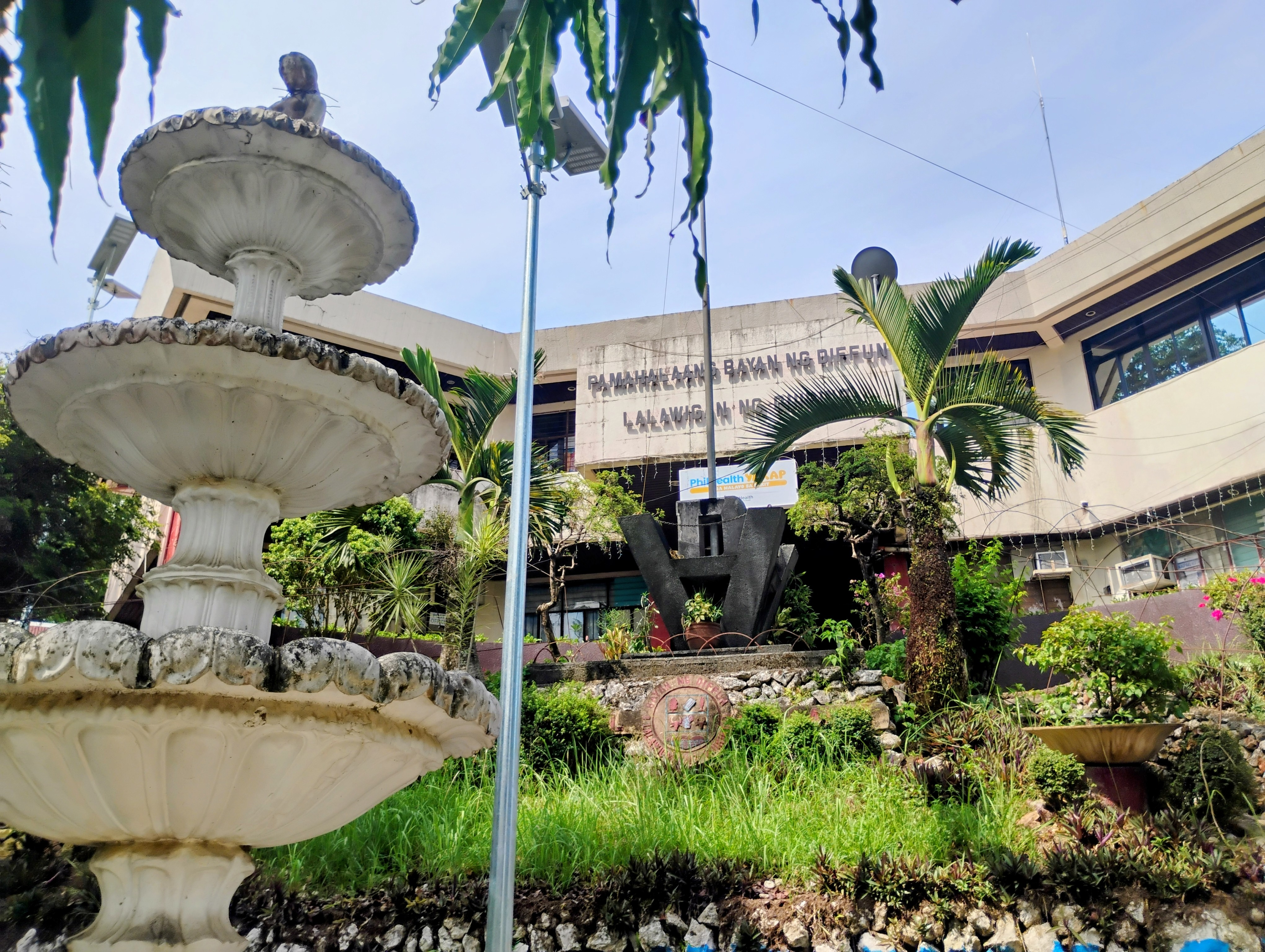
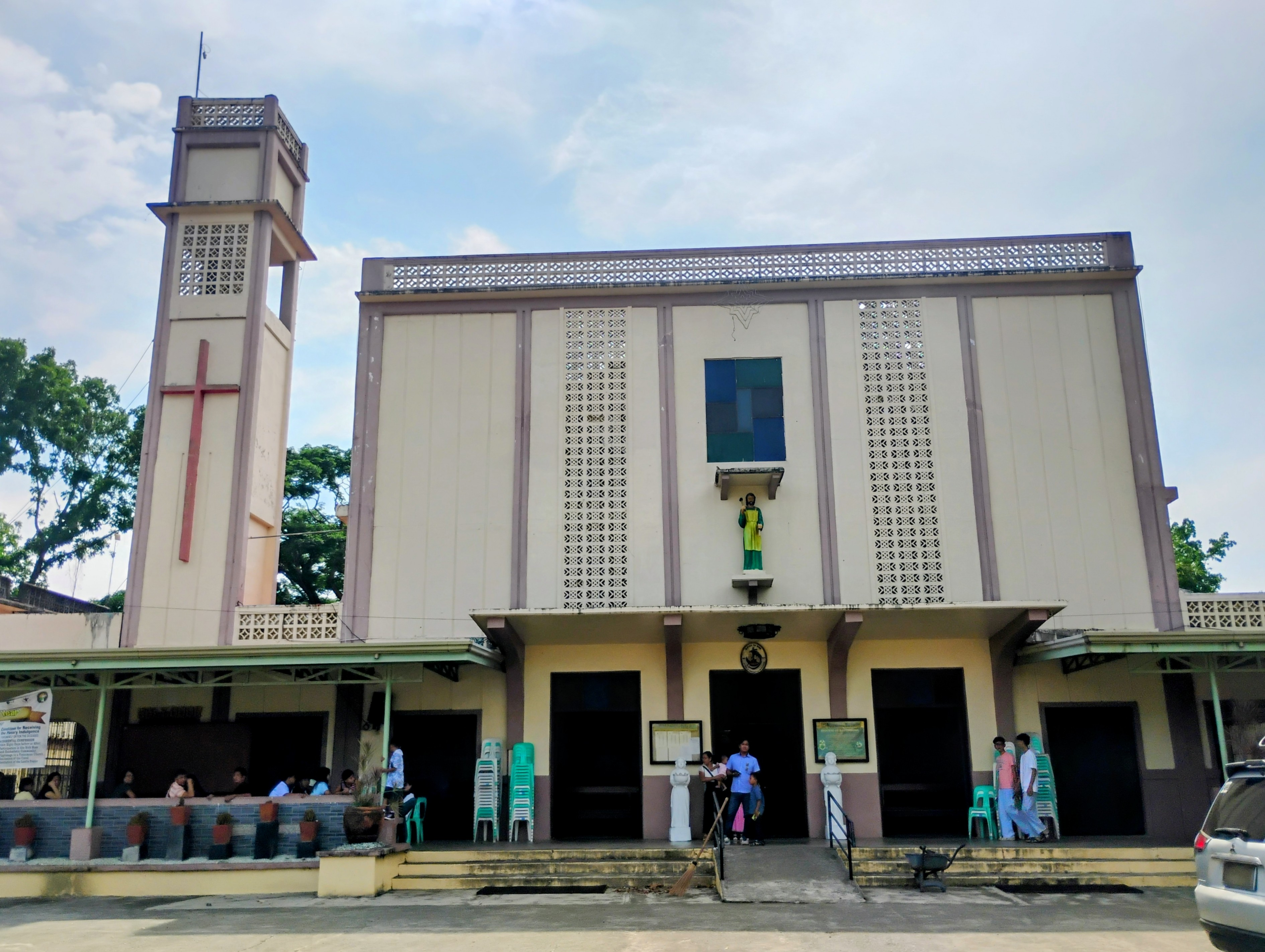
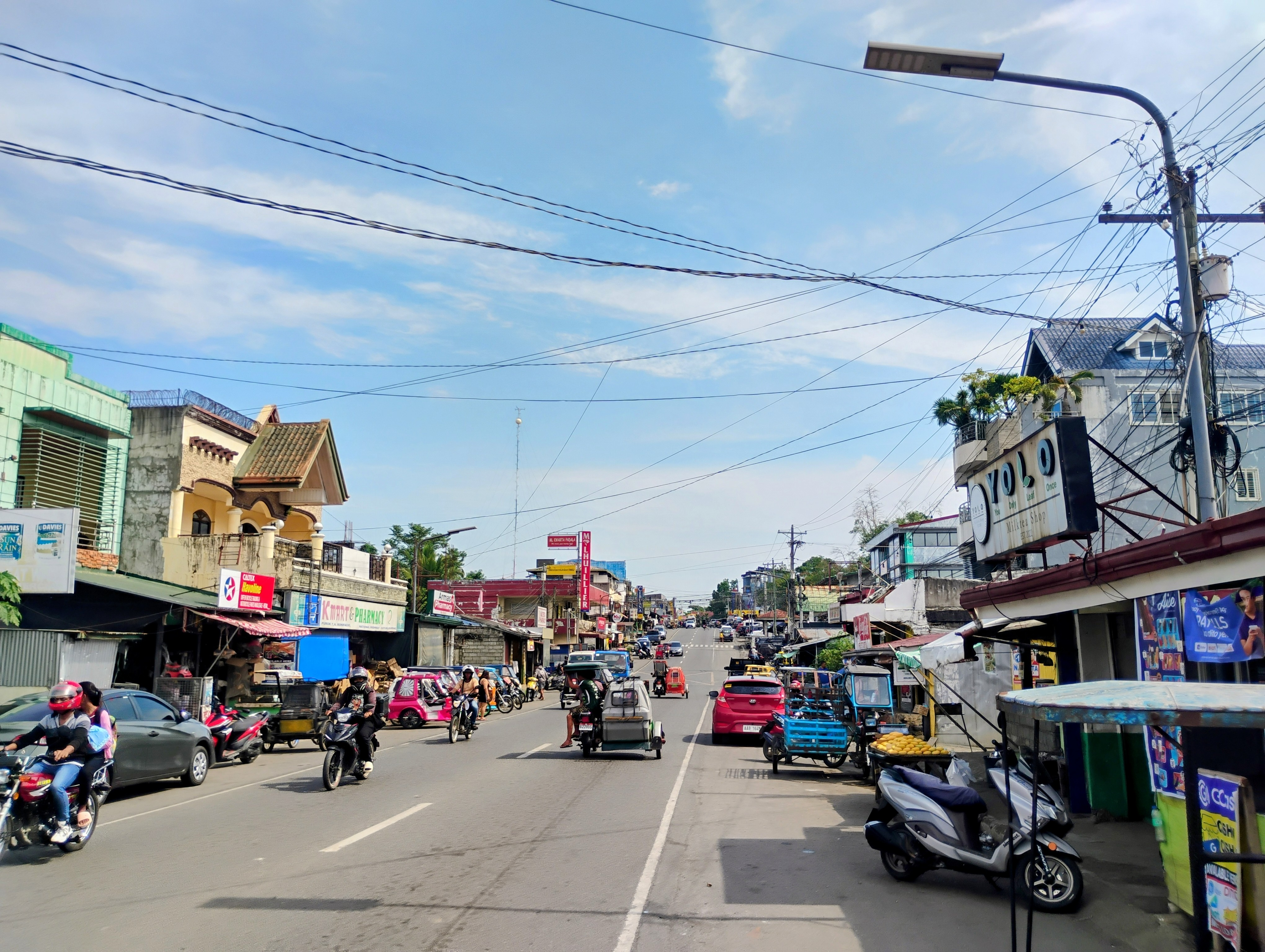
- Old Diffun Municipal Hall Saint Joseph the Worker Parish Church Diffun Town Proper

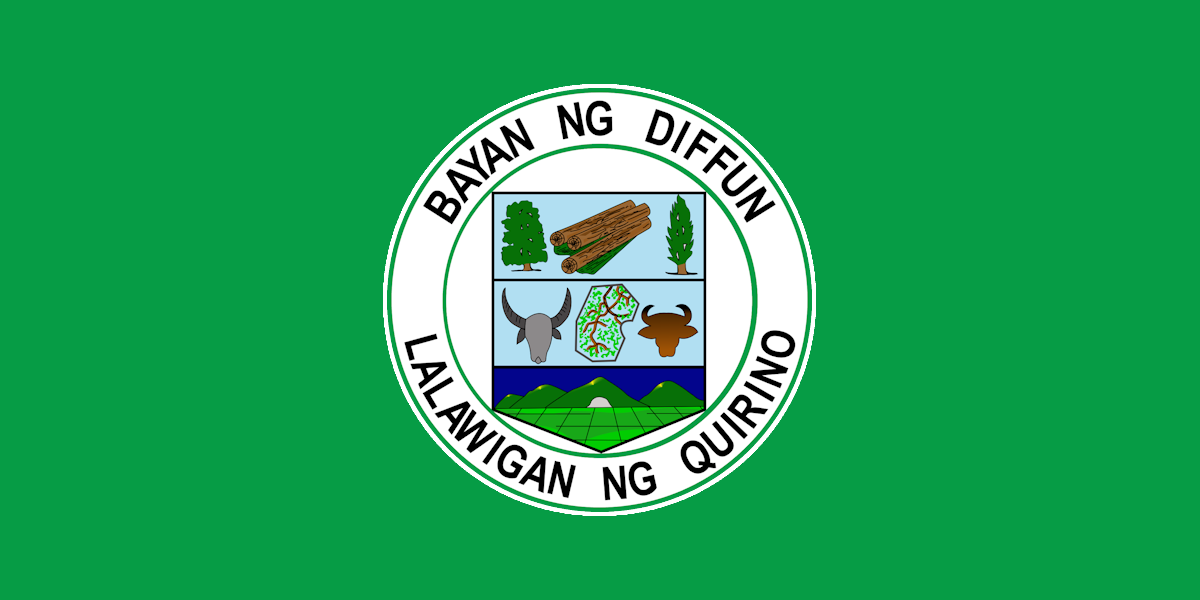
- Flag Seal

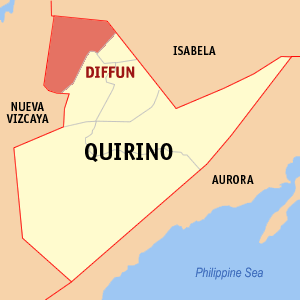
- Map of Quirino with Diffun highlighted
- Interactive map of Diffun
- Location within the Philippines
- Coordinates: 16°35′37″N 121°30′09″E
- Country: Philippines
- Region: Cagayan Valley
- Province: Quirino
- District: Lone district
- Barangays: 33 (see Barangays)

Government
  - Type: Sangguniang Bayan
  - Mayor: May G. Calaunan
  - Vice Mayor: Marlito G. Corpuz
  - Representative: Junie E. Cua
  - Municipal Council: Members: Cesar M. Agustin; Ma. Karen A. Baldonado-Guillermo; Gloria C. Antolin; Renato M. Antolin; Elpidio G. Javonillo; Michael A. Lidiang; Roseller A. Escobar; Cesar C. Valencia
  - Electorate: 32,761 voters (2025)

Area
  - Total: 320.10 km^{2} (123.59 sq mi)
- Elevation: 160 m (520 ft)
- Highest elevation: 551 m (1,808 ft)
- Lowest elevation: 95 m (312 ft)

Population (2024 census)
  - Total: 58,254
  - Density: 181.99/km^{2} (471.34/sq mi)
  - Households: 13,942

Economy
  - Income class: 1st municipal income class
  - Poverty incidence: 9% (2023)
  - Revenue: ₱ 302.5 million (2024)
  - Assets: ₱ 800.8 million (2024)
  - Expenditure: ₱ 290.2 million (2024)
  - Liabilities: ₱ 277.9 million (2024)

Service provider
  - Electricity: Quirino Electric Cooperative (QUIRELCO)
- Time zone: UTC+8 (PST)
- ZIP code: 3401
- PSGC: 0205703000
- IDD : area code: +63 (0)78
- Native languages: Ilocano; Bugkalot; Tagalog
- Website: www.diffun-quirino.gov.ph

Diffun, officially the Municipality of Diffun (Ilocano: Ili ti Diffun; Tagalog: Bayan ng Diffun), is a municipality in the province of Quirino, Philippines. According to the 2024 census, it has a population of 58,254 people, making it the most populous town in the province.

Commercial establishments proliferated along the provincial road due to its proximity to Santiago City as the main commercial hub of the region.

== Geography ==
Diffun is situated 10.99 kilometres (6.83 mi) from the provincial capital Cabarroguis, and 360.48 kilometres (223.99 mi) from the country's capital city of Manila.

=== Barangays ===
Diffun is politically subdivided into 33 barangays. Each barangay consists of puroks and some have sitios.

- Andres Bonifacio (Poblacion)
- Aurora East (Poblacion)
- Aurora West (Poblacion)
- Baguio Village
- Balagbag
- Bannawag
- Cajel
- Campamento
- Diego Silang
- Sittio Der-an
- Don Mariano Perez, Sr.
- Doña Imelda
- Dumanisi
- Gabriela Silang
- Gulac
- Guribang
- Ifugao Village
- Isidro Paredes
- Rizal (Poblacion)
- Liwayway
- Luttuad
- Magsaysay
- Makate
- Maria Clara
- Rafael Palma (Don Sergio Osm)
- Ricarte Norte
- Ricarte Sur
- San Antonio
- San Isidro
- San Pascual
- Villa Pascua
- Aklan Village
- Gregorio Pimentel
- Don Faustino Pagaduan

=== Climate ===
Climate data for Diffun, Quirino
Month	Jan	Feb	Mar	Apr	May	Jun	Jul	Aug	Sep	Oct	Nov	Dec	Year
Mean daily maximum °C (°F)	25 (77)	26 (79)	29 (84)	32 (90)	32 (90)	31 (88)	30 (86)	30 (86)	30 (86)	29 (84)	27 (81)	25 (77)	29 (84)
Mean daily minimum °C (°F)	19 (66)	20 (68)	21 (70)	23 (73)	24 (75)	24 (75)	24 (75)	24 (75)	24 (75)	23 (73)	22 (72)	21 (70)	22 (72)
Average precipitation mm (inches)	119 (4.7)	83 (3.3)	54 (2.1)	37 (1.5)	133 (5.2)	132 (5.2)	161 (6.3)	163 (6.4)	153 (6.0)	142 (5.6)	160 (6.3)	224 (8.8)	1,561 (61.4)
Average rainy days	18.4	13.6	11.6	9.4	19.3	21.9	23.9	23.4	21.1	16.3	18.1	21.4	218.4
Source: Meteoblue

== Demographics ==
Population census of Diffun
Year	Pop.	±% p.a.
1960	9,106	—
1970	14,233	+4.56%
1975	17,811	+4.60%
1980	23,086	+5.32%
1990	31,266	+3.08%
1995	36,048	+2.70%
2000	39,489	+1.97%
2007	42,958	+1.17%
2010	48,501	+4.52%
2015	52,569	+1.55%
2020	56,102	+1.38%
2024	58,254	+0.91%
Source: Philippine Statistics Authority

== Economy ==
Poverty incidence of Diffun (%)

Source: Philippine Statistics Authority

== Government ==
=== Local government ===
Diffun is part of the lone congressional district of the province of Quirino. It is governed by a mayor, designated as its local chief executive, and by a municipal council as its legislative body in accordance with the Local Government Code. The mayor, vice mayor, and the municipal councilors are elected directly in polls held every three years.

=== Elected officials ===
Members of the Municipal Council (2019–2022)
Position	Name
Congressman	Junie E. Cua
Mayor	May G. Calaunan
Vice-Mayor	Marlito G. Corpuz
Councilors	Cesar M. Agustin
Councilors	Ma. Karen A. Baldonado-Guillermo
Councilors	Gloria C. Antolin
Councilors	Renato M. Antolin
Councilors	Elpidio G. Javonillo
Councilors	Michael A. Lidiang
Councilors	Roseller A. Escobar
Councilors	Cesar C. Valencia

== Education ==
The Schools Division of Quirino governs the town's public education system. The division office is a field office of the DepEd in Cagayan Valley region. There are two schools district offices which govern the public and private elementary and high schools throughout the municipality. Theser are Diffun I District, and Diffun II District.

=== Primary and elementary schools ===
- Aklan Village Elementary School
- Ammogaoen Elementary School
- Andres Bonifacio Elementary School
- Baguio Village Elementary School
- Balagbag Elementary School
- Bannawag San Antonio Integrated School (Elementary)
- Bikibik Elementary School
- Cajel Elementary School
- Campamento Elementary School
- Cupianan Elementary School
- Der-an Integrated School (Elementary)
- Diego Silang Elementary School
- Diffun Central School - Integrated SPED Center (Elementary)
- Diffun West Central School
- Don Faustino Pagaduan Elementary School
- Don Mariano Perez Elementary School
- Doña Imelda Elementary School
- Dumanisi Integrated School (Elementary)
- El Elyon Learning Center
- Guinagat Elementary School
- Gulac Integrated School (Elementary)
- Guribang Elementary School
- Ifugao Village Integrated School (Elementary)
- Isidro Paredes Elementary School
- Liwanag Elementary School
- Liwayway Elementary School
- Lower Gabriela Elementary School
- Luttuad Elementary School
- Macate Elementary School
- Magsaysay Elementary School
- Maria Clara Elementary School
- Pallutan Elementary School
- Pamungyen Elementary School
- Pimentel Elementary School
- Rafael Palma Elementary School
- Ricarte Norte Elementary School
- Ricarte Sur Elementary School
- Rizal Elementary School
- San Antonio Integrated School (Elementary)
- San Isidro Integrated School (Elementary)
- San Pascual Elementary School
- Sitio Eden Elementary School
- Turayok Elementary School
- United Methodist Marvelous Kindergarten School
- Upper Gabriela Integrated School (Elementary)
- Villa Pascua Elementary School

=== Secondary schools ===
- Bannawag San Antonio Integrated School
- Der-an Integrated School
- Diffun Central School - Integrated SPED Center
- Diffun National High School
- Dumanisi Integrated School
- Gulac Integrated School
- Ifugao Village Integrated School
- Magsaysay National High School
- Quirino State University Laboratory High School
- San Antonio Integrated School
- San Isidro Integrated School
- St. Mary's Academy
- Upper Gabriela Integrated School

=== Higher educational institution ===
- Quirino State University
