= Maddela =

Municipality in Quirino, Philippines

Maddela Pinappagan
- Municipality
- Municipality of Maddela
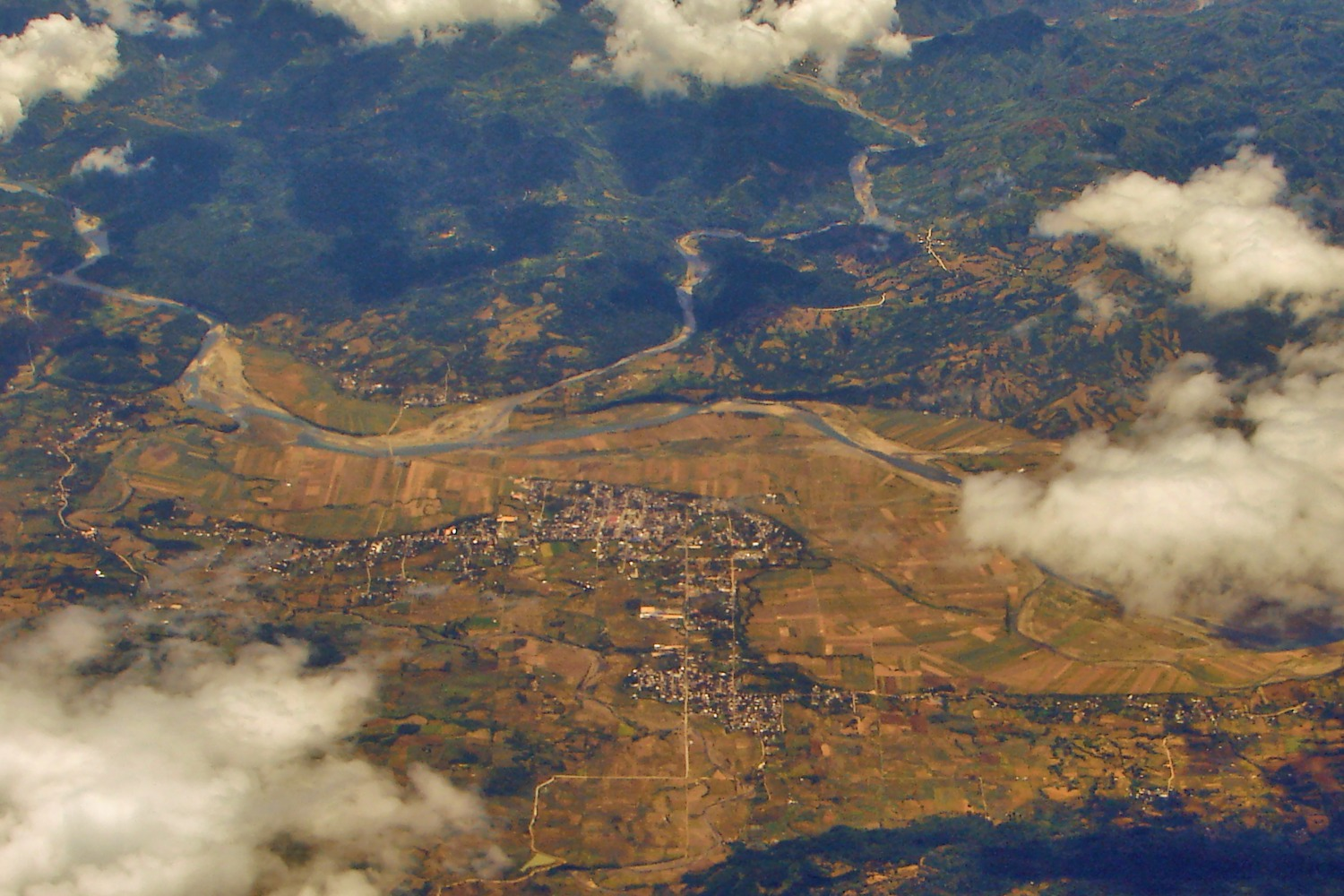
- Aerial view of Maddela

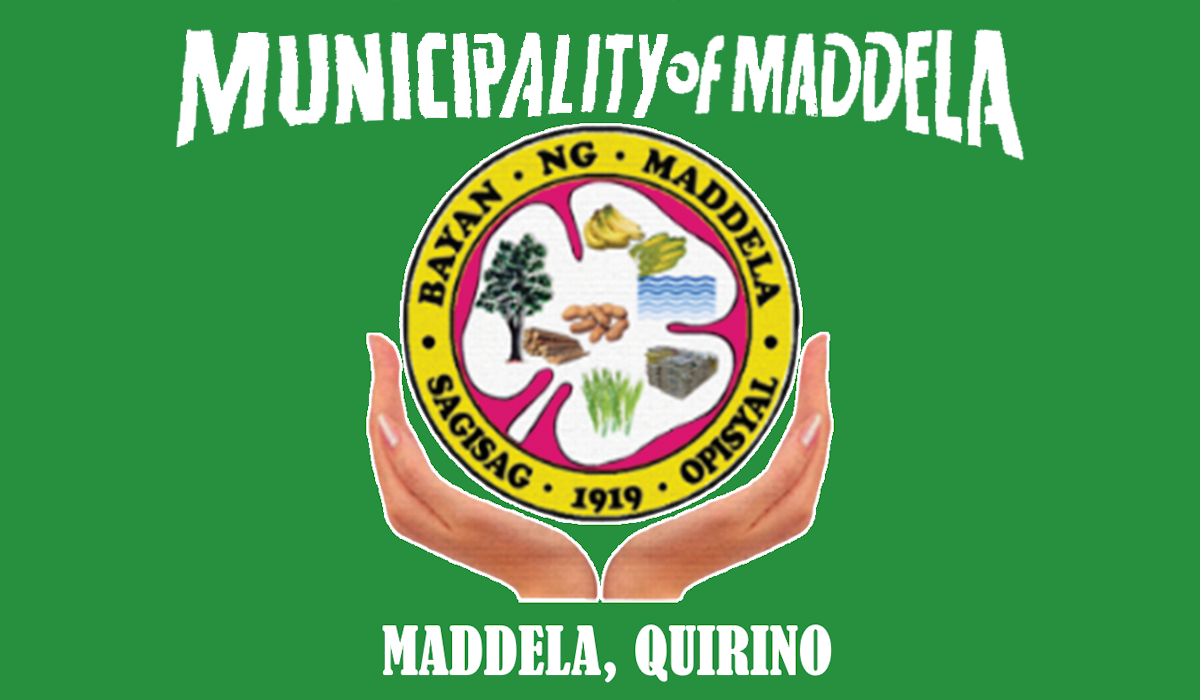
- Flag Seal

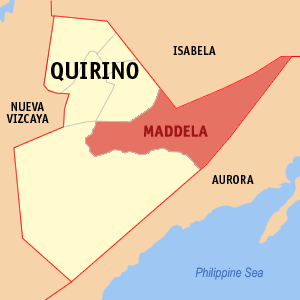
- Map of Quirino with Maddela highlighted
- Interactive map of Maddela
- Location within the Philippines
- Coordinates: 16°20′28″N 121°41′00″E
- Country: Philippines
- Region: Cagayan Valley
- Province: Quirino
- District: Lone district
- Named for: Tomas Maddela
- Barangays: 32 (see Barangays)

Government
  - Type: Sangguniang Bayan
  - Mayor: Florante T. Ruiz
  - Vice Mayor: Rimel C. Tolentino
  - Representative: Junie E. Cua
  - Municipal Council: Members: Junard N. Rmaos; Prescy D. Albano; Renato M. Ylanan Jr.; Carlos C. Naboye; Melchor C. Sad-en; Kreizer Jhun S. Hidalgo; Mariano B. Gadingan Jr.; Orlando L. Salvador Jr.
  - Electorate: 26,037 voters (2025)

Area
  - Total: 918.57 km^{2} (354.66 sq mi)
- Elevation: 203 m (666 ft)
- Highest elevation: 639 m (2,096 ft)
- Lowest elevation: 133 m (436 ft)

Population (2024 census)
  - Total: 41,867
  - Density: 45.578/km^{2} (118.05/sq mi)
  - Households: 9,893

Economy
  - Income class: 1st municipal income class
  - Poverty incidence: 6.99% (2023)
  - Revenue: ₱ 507.4 million (2024)
  - Assets: ₱ 909 million (2024)
  - Expenditure: ₱ 506.7 million (2024)
  - Liabilities: ₱ 272.7 million (2024)

Service provider
  - Electricity: Quirino Electric Cooperative (QUIRELCO)
- Time zone: UTC+8 (PST)
- ZIP code: 3404
- PSGC: 0205704000
- IDD : area code: +63 (0)78
- Native languages: Ilocano; Bugkalot; Arta; Tagalog
- Website: maddela-quirino.gov.ph

Maddela, officially the Municipality of Maddela (Ilocano: Ili ti Maddela; Tagalog: Bayan ng Maddela), is a municipality in the province of Quirino, Philippines. According to the 2024 census, it has a population of 41,867 people.

It is the commercial hub of the province. It is located between the provinces of Isabela and Aurora.

== History ==
Before the advent of migration and urban development planning, Maddela was inhabited by native tribes who resided within the Sierra Madre Mountains and the hinterlands of the Mamparang Ranges. The dominant tribes were the Ilongots (or Bugcalots) and the Dumagats, each with their distinct cultures and lifestyles.

The Ilongots occupied the western upland territory, extending upstream along the Cagayan River to Dupax, Nueva Vizcaya. They lived in organized villages with simple governments. In contrast, the Dumagats inhabited the eastern portion of the Cagayan River, living a nomadic lifestyle in makeshift huts made of forest leaves and subsisting on hunting and root crops.

In 1919, a group of 20 Ilocanos led by Forester Vicente Velasco settled along the Cagayan River, gradually expanding into the Pinappagan valley, now Maddela. The Ilocanos, known for their enterprising spirit, cultivated crops such as rice, tobacco, corn, and peanuts, and established friendly relations with the native tribes.

The period between 1922 and 1925 marked the beginning of permanent settlement, with Lt. Quintin Alcantara initiating the construction of a road connecting Pinappagan and Panang. Pinappagan was designated a municipal district attached to Bagabag, Nueva Vizcaya, with Eusebio Martin appointed as its first President. During the Japanese occupation, Marcos Pimentel and Fernando Castillo alternately served as municipal district mayors. In 1950, Pinappagan was renamed Maddela and became a regular town, with Jose Ancheta as its first mayor. The municipality was named in honor of former Nueva Vizcaya Governor Tomas Maddela.

Over the years, Maddela expanded its territory and governance structure, with Dionisio Sarandi elected as mayor in the first regular local elections in 1956. During Sarandi's term, several new barrios were created, leading to agricultural expansion and increased commerce and trade with neighboring towns in Isabela.

== Geography ==
Maddela is situated 30.48 kilometres (18.94 mi) from the provincial capital Cabarroguis, and 400.06 kilometres (248.59 mi) from the country's capital city of Manila.

=== Barangays ===
Maddela is politically subdivided into 32 barangays. Each barangay consists of puroks and some have sitios.

- Abbag
- Balligui
- Buenavista
- Cabaruan
- Cabua-an
- Cofcaville
- Diduyon
- Dipintin
- Divisoria Norte
- Divisoria Sur (Bisangal)
- Dumabato Norte
- Dumabato Sur
- Lusod
- Manglad
- Pedlisan
- Poblacion Norte
- Poblacion Sur
- San Bernabe
- San Dionisio I
- San Martin
- San Pedro
- San Salvador
- Santo Niño
- Santo Tomas
- Villa Gracia
- Villa Hermosa Sur
- Villa Hermosa Norte
- Ysmael
- Villa Agullana
- Villa Jose V Ylanan
- Jose Ancheta
- Santa Maria

=== Climate ===
Climate data for Maddela, Quirino
Month	Jan	Feb	Mar	Apr	May	Jun	Jul	Aug	Sep	Oct	Nov	Dec	Year
Mean daily maximum °C (°F)	25 (77)	26 (79)	27 (81)	30 (86)	30 (86)	30 (86)	29 (84)	29 (84)	29 (84)	28 (82)	27 (81)	25 (77)	28 (82)
Mean daily minimum °C (°F)	20 (68)	20 (68)	21 (70)	22 (72)	24 (75)	24 (75)	24 (75)	24 (75)	23 (73)	22 (72)	22 (72)	20 (68)	22 (72)
Average precipitation mm (inches)	67 (2.6)	54 (2.1)	51 (2.0)	50 (2.0)	135 (5.3)	166 (6.5)	199 (7.8)	191 (7.5)	188 (7.4)	157 (6.2)	102 (4.0)	104 (4.1)	1,464 (57.5)
Average rainy days	17.0	13.9	14.6	13.7	20.9	22.4	25.8	26.0	24.9	19.3	15.7	16.6	230.8
Source: Meteoblue

== Demographics ==
Population census of Maddela

Year	Pop.	±% p.a.
1939	3,923	—
1948	2,520	−4.80%
1960	7,920	+10.01%
1970	14,976	+6.57%
1975	20,016	+5.99%
1980	23,686	+3.42%
1990	25,268	+0.65%

Year	Pop.	±% p.a.
1995	28,645	+2.38%
2000	32,236	+2.56%
2007	33,637	+0.59%
2010	35,634	+2.12%
2015	38,499	+1.48%
2020	40,943	+1.30%
2024	41,867	+0.54%

Source: Philippine Statistics Authority

== Economy ==
Poverty incidence of Maddela (%)

Source: Philippine Statistics Authority

== Government ==
=== Local government ===
Maddela is part of the lone congressional district of the province of Quirino. It is governed by a mayor, designated as its local chief executive, and by a municipal council as its legislative body in accordance with the Local Government Code. The mayor, vice mayor, and the municipal councilors are elected directly in polls held every three years.

=== Elected officials ===
Members of the Municipal Council (2019–2022)
Position	Name
Congressman	Junie E. Cua
Mayor	Rimel C. Tolentino
Vice-Mayor	Joel Badogen
Councilors	Junard N. Ramos
Councilors	Prescy D. Albano
Councilors	Renato M. Ylanan Jr.
Councilors	Carlos C. Naboye
Councilors	Melchor C. Sad-en
Councilors	Kreizer Jhun S. Hidalgo
Councilors	Mariano B. Gadingan Jr.
Councilors	Orlando L. Salvador Jr.

== Education ==
The Schools Division of Quirino governs the town's public education system. The division office is a field office of the DepEd in Cagayan Valley region. There are two schools district offices that govern the public and private elementary and high schools throughout the municipality. These are the Maddela Zone I District Office, and Maddela Zone II District Office.

=== Primary and elementary schools ===
- Abbag Elementary School
- Agta Community Primary School
- Balligui Elementary School
- Cabaruan Integrated School (Elementary)
- Cofcaville Integrated School (Elementary)
- Dialanese Elementary School
- Diduyon Elementary School
- Divisoria Norte Elementary School
- Divisoria Sur Integrated School (Elementary)
- Dumabato United Methodist Learning Center
- Kaboa-an Elementary School
- Lusod Elementary School
- Maddela Baptist Christian School
- Maddela Integrated School of Arts & Trades (Elementary)
- Maddela Marvelous Grace Christian School (Elementary)
- Maddela South Central School
- Manglad Elementary School
- Mariano Gadingan Sr. Elementary School
- Mataga-ay Elementary School
- Pedlisan Elementary School
- San Bernabe Elementary School
- San Dionisio I Elementary School
- San Martin Integrated School (Elementary)
- San Pedro Elementary School
- San Salvador Elementary School
- Sang-aydi Elementary School
- St. Vincent School (Elementary)
- Sto. Niño Elementary School
- Sto. Tomas Elementary School
- Villa Agullana Elementary School
- Villa Gracia Integrated School (Elementary)
- Villa Hermosa Sur Elementary School
- Villa Hermoza Elementary School
- Villa Jose Ylanan Elementary School
- Villamor Elementary School
- Ysmael Elementary School

=== Secondary schools ===
- Balligui High School
- Cabaruan Integrated School
- Cofcaville Integrated School
- Dipintin High School
- Divisoria Sur Integrated School
- Maddela Central High School
- Maddela Integrated School of Arts & Trades
- Maddela Marvelous Grace Christian School
- Maddela North Central School Integrated SPED Center
- San Martin Integrated School
- St. Vincent School
- Villa Gracia Integrated School

=== Higher educational institution ===
- Quirino State University

== Tourism ==
The famous Governors Rapid can be found in Maddela, in the Barangay of Divisoria Sur. It gained fame and attracted tourists after it was featured on Rated K of ABS-CBN along with the Siitan Nature Park in Nagtipunan, one of the Municipalities of Quirino Province.

Maddela is also known for its festival, the Panagsasalog. It is an Ilocano term for "farmers on their way to farm". The Panagsasalog Festival is celebrated annually on July 10–12. The festival is also celebrated with the Search for Mutya ng Maddela along with some contests. On the last day, there is a parade of the reigning pageant winners, municipal officials, and barangay officials and with the drum and lyre corps of the near elementary and high schools.

== Media ==
- 101.7 MHz DZVJ Radyo Natin Maddela
- 103.3 MHz DWQP Radyo Quirino
