= Aglipay, Quirino =

Municipality in Quirino, Philippines

Aglipay
- Municipality
- Municipality of Aglipay
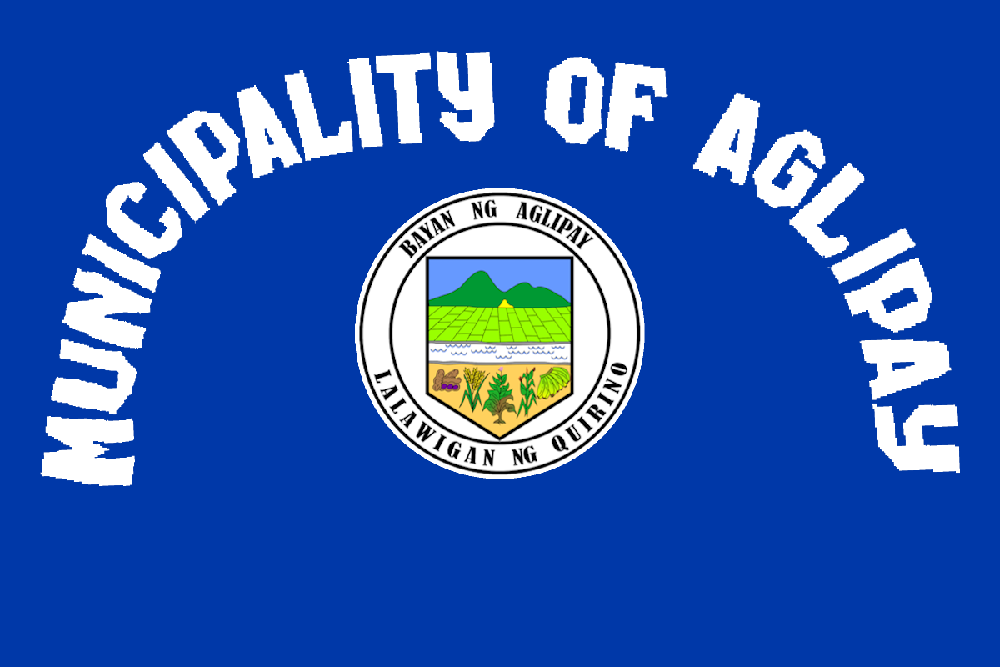
- Flag Seal

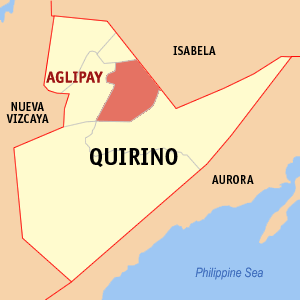
- Map of Quirino with Aglipay highlighted
- Interactive map of Aglipay
- Location within the Philippines
- Coordinates: 16°29′20″N 121°35′14″E
- Country: Philippines
- Region: Cagayan Valley
- Province: Quirino
- District: Lone district
- Named for: Gregorio Aglipay
- Barangays: 25 (see Barangays)

Government
  - Type: Sangguniang Bayan
  - Mayor: Jerry T. Agsalda
  - Vice Mayor: Warlita G. Alberto
  - Representative: Junie E. Cua
  - Municipal Council: Members: Giovanni M. Eustaquio; Jose R. Domingo; Fernando T. Baldos; Virgilio T. Agsalda; Eligio C. Aquino; Arturo A. Quebral; Genaro H. Saladino; Edgar D. Naval
  - Electorate: 19,431 voters (2025)

Area
  - Total: 161.70 km^{2} (62.43 sq mi)
- Elevation: 146 m (479 ft)
- Highest elevation: 477 m (1,565 ft)
- Lowest elevation: 95 m (312 ft)

Population (2024 census)
  - Total: 31,596
  - Density: 195.40/km^{2} (506.08/sq mi)
  - Households: 7,740

Economy
  - Income class: 2nd municipal income class
  - Poverty incidence: 8.48% (2023)
  - Revenue: ₱ 203.1 million (2024)
  - Assets: ₱ 321.2 million (2024)
  - Expenditure: ₱ 167.1 million (2024)
  - Liabilities: ₱ 50.05 million (2024)

Service provider
  - Electricity: Quirino Electric Cooperative (QUIRELCO)
- Time zone: UTC+8 (PST)
- ZIP code: 3403
- PSGC: 0205701000
- IDD : area code: +63 (0)78
- Native languages: Ilocano; Bugkalot; Arta; Tagalog
- Website: www.aglipay-quirino.gov.ph

Aglipay, officially the Municipality of Aglipay (Ilocano: Ili ti Aglipay; Tagalog: Bayan ng Aglipay), is a municipality in the province of Quirino, Philippines. According to the 2024 census, it has a population of 31,596 people.

== Etymology ==
Aglipay derives its named from Gregorio Aglipay, a Filipino priest and revolutionary who opposed the Spanish colonizers and settled along the banks of the Addalam River in the present-day municipality.

== History ==
Aglipay was established as a municipality in Nueva Vizcaya by virtue of Executive Order No. 368, signed by President Elpidio Quirino on November 11, 1950. Later, on June 18, 1966, the municipality was incorporated to the newly established sub-province of Quirino by virtue of Republic Act No. 4734.

On June 21, 1969, Barrios Banuar, Bekebik, Burgos, Capellangan, Dabibi, Del Pilar, Dingasan, Eden, Malini, Mangandingay, Tucod, Villamor, and Zamora were ceded to Cabarroguis, the provincial capital.

== Geography ==
Aglipay is situated 8.25 kilometres (5.13 mi) from the provincial capital Cabarroguis, and 377.83 kilometres (234.77 mi) from the country's capital city of Manila.

=== Barangays ===
Aglipay is politically subdivided into 25 barangays. Each barangay consists of puroks and some have I sitios.

- Dagupan
- Dumabel
- Dungo (Osmeña)
- Guinalbin
- Ligaya
- Palacian
- Pinaripad Sur
- Progreso (Poblacion)
- Ramos
- Rang-ayan
- San Antonio
- San Francisco
- San Leonardo
- San Ramon
- Victoria
- Villa Pagaduan
- Villa Santiago
- Alicia
- Cabugao
- Diodol
- Nagabgaban
- Pinaripad Norte
- San Benigno
- San Manuel
- Villa Ventura

=== Climate ===
Climate data for Aglipay, Quirino
Month	Jan	Feb	Mar	Apr	May	Jun	Jul	Aug	Sep	Oct	Nov	Dec	Year
Mean daily maximum °C (°F)	25 (77)	26 (79)	28 (82)	30 (86)	30 (86)	30 (86)	29 (84)	29 (84)	29 (84)	29 (84)	27 (81)	26 (79)	28 (83)
Mean daily minimum °C (°F)	20 (68)	20 (68)	21 (70)	23 (73)	24 (75)	24 (75)	24 (75)	24 (75)	24 (75)	22 (72)	22 (72)	21 (70)	22 (72)
Average precipitation mm (inches)	67 (2.6)	54 (2.1)	51 (2.0)	50 (2.0)	135 (5.3)	166 (6.5)	199 (7.8)	191 (7.5)	188 (7.4)	157 (6.2)	102 (4.0)	104 (4.1)	1,464 (57.5)
Average rainy days	17.0	13.9	14.6	13.7	20.9	22.4	25.8	26.0	24.9	19.3	15.7	16.6	230.8
Source: Meteoblue

== Demographics ==
Population census of Aglipay
Year	Pop.	±% p.a.
1960	3,976	—
1970	7,854	+7.04%
1975	9,775	+4.49%
1980	12,335	+4.76%
1990	16,427	+2.91%
1995	20,205	+3.95%
2000	21,774	+1.62%
2007	25,069	+1.96%
2010	26,187	+1.60%
2015	27,787	+1.14%
2020	30,714	+2.13%
2024	31,596	+0.68%
Source: Philippine Statistics Authority

== Economy ==
Poverty incidence of Aglipay

Source: Philippine Statistics Authority

== Government ==
=== Local government ===
Aglipay is part of the lone congressional district of the province of Quirino. It is governed by a mayor, designated as its local chief executive, and by a municipal council as its legislative body in accordance with the Local Government Code. The mayor, vice mayor, and the municipal councilors are elected directly in polls held every three years.

== Education ==
The Schools Division of Quirino governs the town's public education system. The division office is a field office of the DepEd in Cagayan Valley region. The Aglipay Schools District Office governs the public and private elementary and high schools throughout the municipality.

=== Primary and elementary schools ===
- Aglipay East Central School (Progreso Elementary School)
- Aglipay West Central School
- Cabugao Elementary School
- Diffun Amazing West Kiddie Learning Center
- Diodol Elementary School
- Diodol Elementary School Annex
- Gabriela Adventist Multigrade School
- Ligaya Elementary School
- Methodist Beatitudes School
- Osmena Elementary School
- Osmena Primary School Annex
- Palacian Elementary School
- Pinahiw Elementary School
- Pinaripad Norte Elementary School
- Pinaripad Sur Elementary School
- Ramos Elementary School
- Rang-ayan Primary School
- San Antonio Elementary School
- San Benigno Elementary School
- San Francisco Elementary School
- San Francisco Elementary School Annex
- San Ramon Elementary School
- St. Christian Educational Center
- Victoria North Elementary School
- Victoria South Elementary School
- Villa Pagaduan Elementary School
- Villa Santiago Elementary School
- Villa Ventura Elementary School

=== Secondary schools ===
- Aglipay National High School
- Alicia Integrated School
- Dagupan Integrated School
- Dumabel Integrated School
- Nagabgaban Integrated School
- Our Lady of Lourdes School
- Pinaripad National High School
- San Manuel Integrated School
- Victoria High School
