= Midy Cua =

Filipino politician (born 1979)

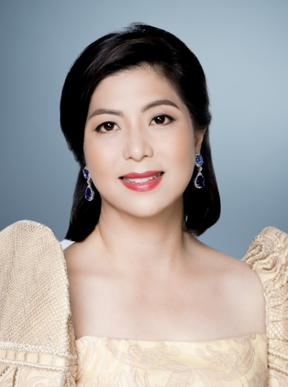
- Official portrait, 2025

Member of the House of Representatives of the Philippines from Quirino's at-large district
- Incumbent
- Assumed office June 30, 2022
- Preceded by: Junie Cua

Personal details
- Born: Midy Chua Nacague; June 11, 1979 (age 47)
- Party: Lakas (2023–present)
- Other political affiliations: PDDS (2021–2023)
- Spouse: Dakila "Dax" Cua (m. 2011; died 2026)
- Children: 3

Midy Chua Nacague Cua (born June 11, 1979) is a Filipino politician who is a member of the House of Representatives for Quirino's at-large congressional district since 2022.

== Career ==
Midy Cua was elected as representative of Quirino's lone district in the 2022 election. She succeeded her father-in-law, Junie Cua.

== Personal life ==
She was the wife of politician Dakila Cua from 2011 until his death in 2026, and the daughter-in-law of Junie Cua. They had three children.

== See also ==
- List of female members of the House of Representatives of the Philippines
- 19th Congress of the Philippines
- 20th Congress of the Philippines
