= Quirino's at-large congressional district =

Legislative district of the Philippines

- Constituency for the House of Representatives of the Philippines
- Location of Quirino within the Philippines
- Province: Quirino
- Region: Cagayan Valley
- Population: 188,991 (2015)
- Electorate: 117,635 (2019)
- Area: 2,323.47 km^{2} (897.10 sq mi)

Current constituency
- Created: 1984
- Representative: Midy Cua
- Political party: Lakas–CMD
- Congressional bloc: Majority

Quirino's at-large congressional district is the sole congressional district of the Philippines in the province of Quirino. It has been represented in the House of Representatives since 1987 and earlier in the Batasang Pambansa from 1984 to 1986.

Quirino first elected a single representative provincewide at-large for the Regular Batasang Pambansa of the Fourth Philippine Republic in 1984 or more than 12 years since its creation as a regular province separate from Nueva Vizcaya on September 10, 1971. Due to the 1972 imposition of martial law and subsequent dissolution of both houses of Congress, the then newly created province has not had a representative elected as provided for in its provincial charter until the restoration of a national legislature in 1978 following a shift to a parliamentary form of government. However, in the national parliament known as the Interim Batasang Pambansa, provincial district representation was replaced by regional representation, with Quirino having been included in the eight-seat Region II's at-large assembly district. The province only elected its first representative following the 1984 Philippine constitutional plebiscite which restored the province, city or district representation in parliament. The district was re-created on February 2, 1987, following the ratification of the 1987 constitution that restored the House of Representatives.

The district is currently represented in the 20th Congress by Midy Cua of the Lakas–CMD.

== Representation history ==
#	Image	Member	Term of office		Batasang Pambansa	Party	Electoral history
#	Image	Member	Start	End	Batasang Pambansa	Party	Electoral history
=== Quirino's at-large district for the Regular Batasang Pambansa ===
District created February 1, 1984 from Region II's at-large district.
1		Orlando Dulay	July 23, 1984	March 25, 1986	2nd	KBL	Elected in 1984.
#	Image	Member	Term of office		Congress	Party	Electoral history
#	Image	Member	Start	End	Congress	Party	Electoral history
=== Quirino's at-large district for the House of Representatives of the Philippines ===
District re-created February 2, 1987.
2		Richard S. Puzon	June 30, 1987	July 25, 1988	8th	Independent	Elected in 1987. Removed from office after an electoral protest.
3		Junie E. Cua	July 25, 1988	June 30, 1998	8th	Liberal	Declared winner of 1987 elections.
3		Junie E. Cua	July 25, 1988	June 30, 1998	9th	LDP	Re-elected in 1992.
3		Junie E. Cua	July 25, 1988	June 30, 1998	10th	Lakas	Re-elected in 1995.
4		Ma. Angela E. Cua	June 30, 1998	June 30, 2001	11th	LAMMP	Elected in 1998.
(3)		Junie E. Cua	June 30, 2001	June 30, 2010	12th	Liberal	Elected in 2001.
(3)		Junie E. Cua	June 30, 2001	June 30, 2010	13th	Lakas	Re-elected in 2004.
(3)		Junie E. Cua	June 30, 2001	June 30, 2010	14th	Lakas	Re-elected in 2007.
5		Dakila Cua	June 30, 2010	June 30, 2019	15th	Liberal	Elected in 2010.
5		Dakila Cua	June 30, 2010	June 30, 2019	16th	Liberal	Re-elected in 2013.
5		Dakila Cua	June 30, 2010	June 30, 2019	17th	PDP–Laban	Re-elected in 2016.
(3)		Junie E. Cua	June 30, 2019	June 30, 2022	18th	PDP–Laban	Elected in 2019.
(3)		Junie E. Cua	June 30, 2019	June 30, 2022	18th	PDDS	Elected in 2019.
6		Midy N. Cua	June 30, 2022	Incumbent	19th	PDDS	Elected in 2022.
6		Midy N. Cua	June 30, 2022	Incumbent	20th	Lakas	Re-elected in 2025.

== Election results ==
=== 2022 ===
2022 Philippine House of Representatives elections
Party	Candidate	Votes	%
PDDS	Midy Cua	88,864	94.09
Independent	Vic Senica	5,582	5.91
Total votes		94,446	100.00
PDDS hold			

=== 2019 ===
2019 Philippine House of Representatives elections
Party	Candidate	Votes	%
PDP–Laban	Junie Cua	76,320	100.00
Valid ballots		76,320	64.88
Invalid or blank votes		41,315	35.12
Total votes		117,635	100.00
PDP–Laban hold			

== See also ==
- Legislative districts of Quirino
