= Legislative districts of Quirino =

Districts of Philippine province

The legislative districts of Quirino are the representations of the province of Quirino in the various national legislatures of the Philippines. The province is currently represented in the lower house of the Congress of the Philippines through its lone congressional district.

== History ==
The province was part of Nueva Vizcaya until 1973, and was last represented in Congress as part of it in 1972. From 1978 to 1984 it was part of the representation of Region II, and gained its own representation in 1984.

== Current districts ==
Legislative Districts and Congressional Representatives of Quirino
District	Current Representative	Party	Population (2020)	Area
Lone	Midy Cua (since 2022); Cabarroguis	Lakas–CMD	203,828	2,323.47 km^{2}

== See also ==
- Legislative district of Nueva Vizcaya
