= Quirino =

Province in Cagayan Valley, Philippines

- Province
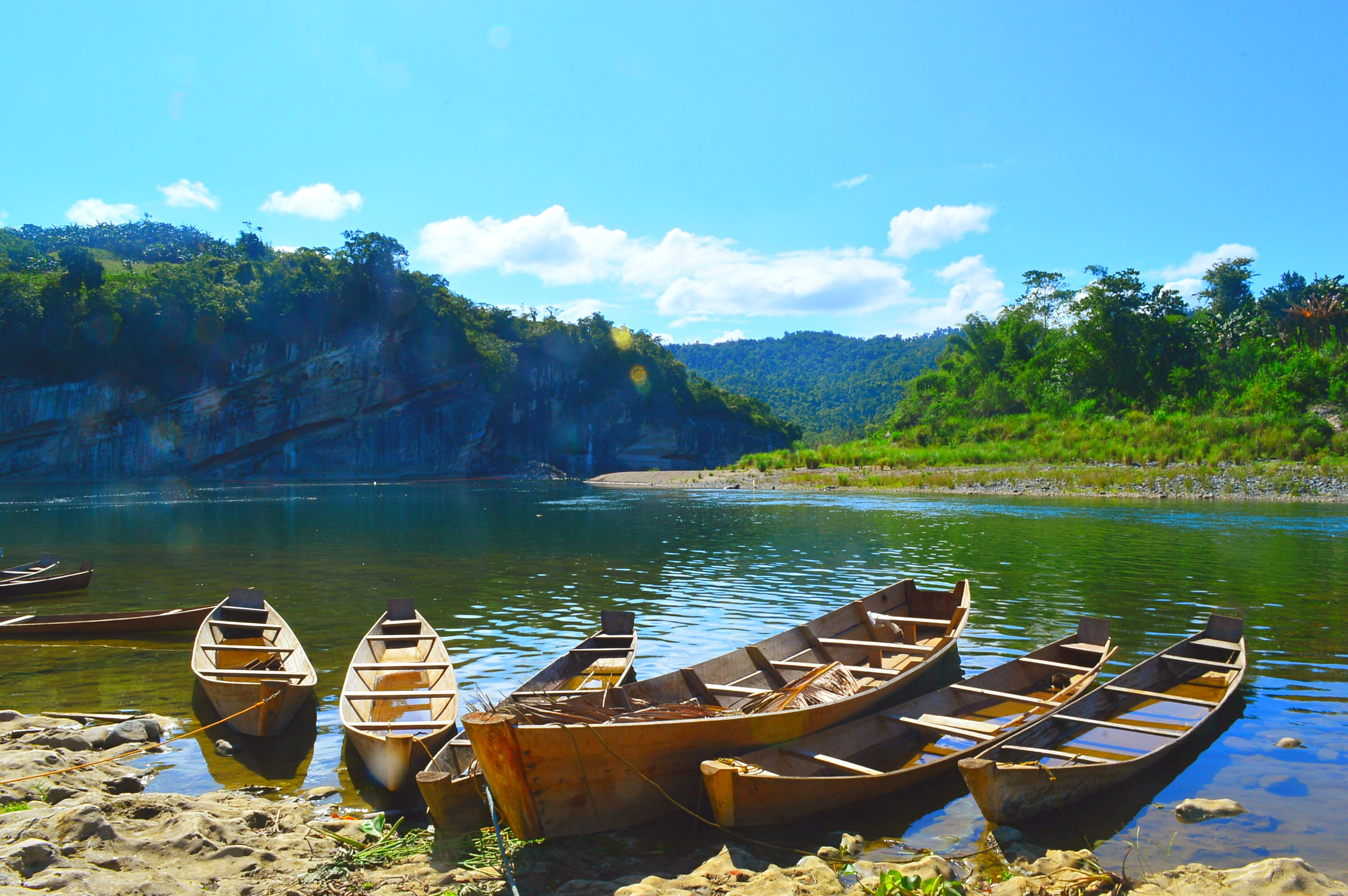
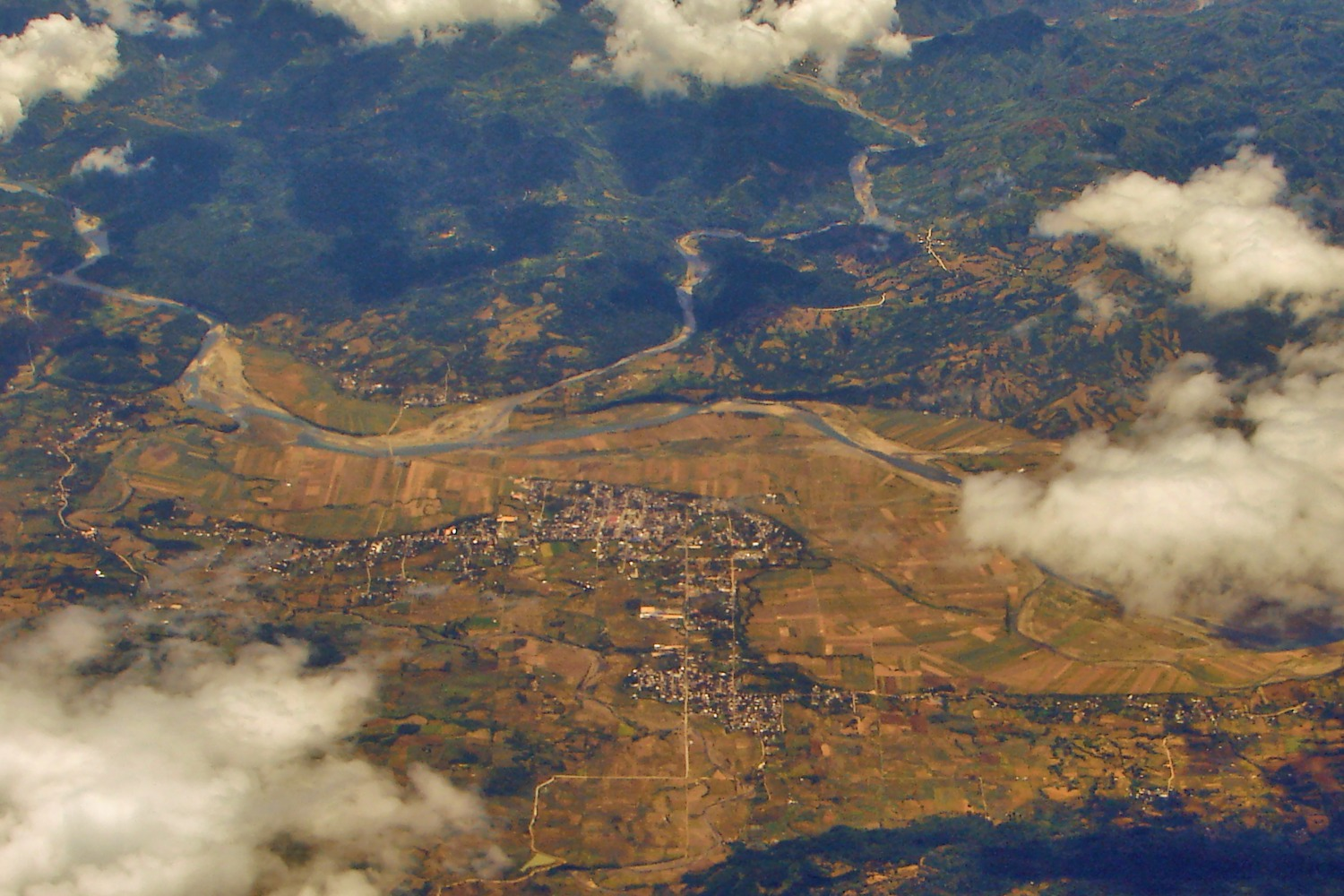
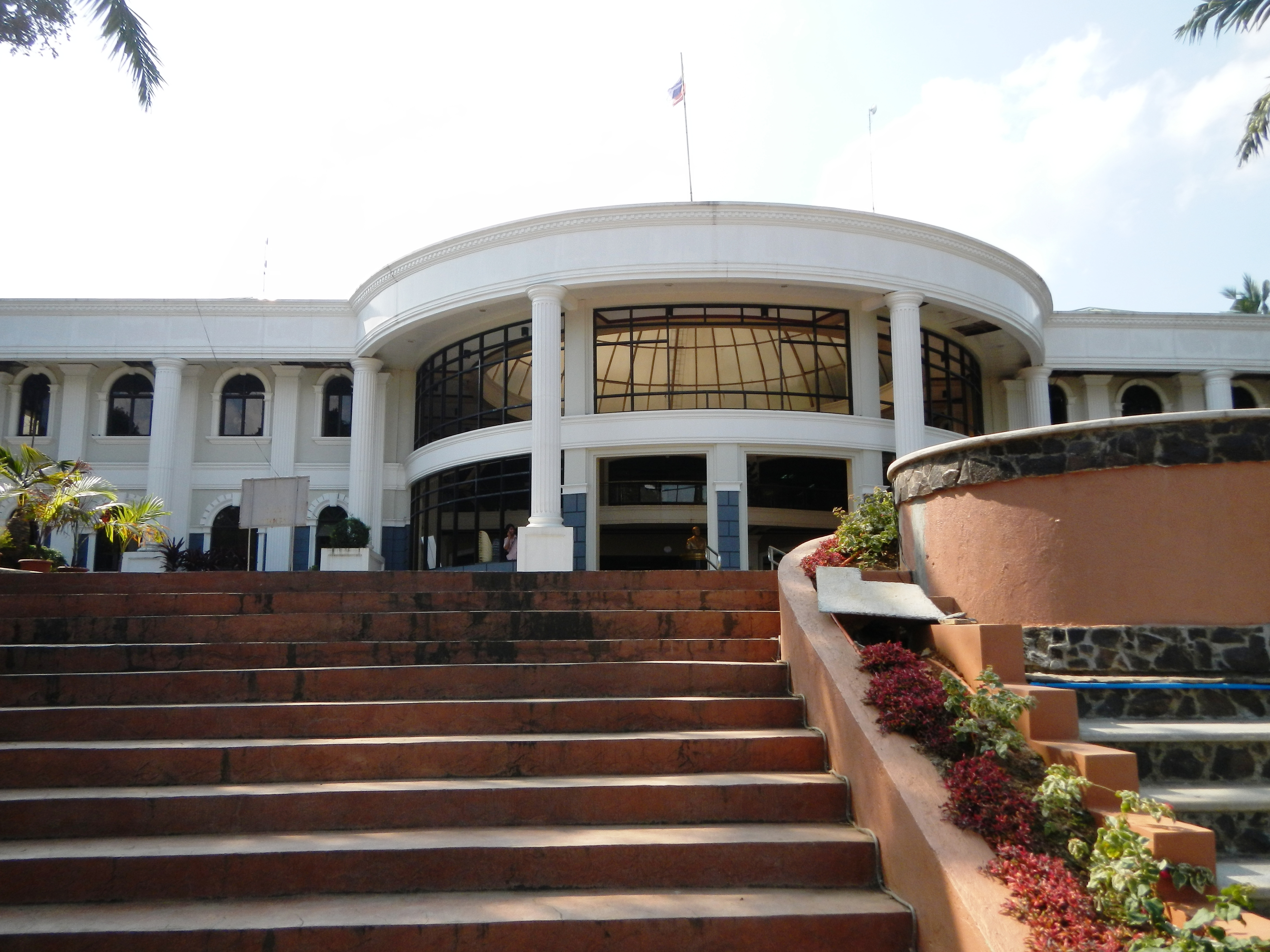
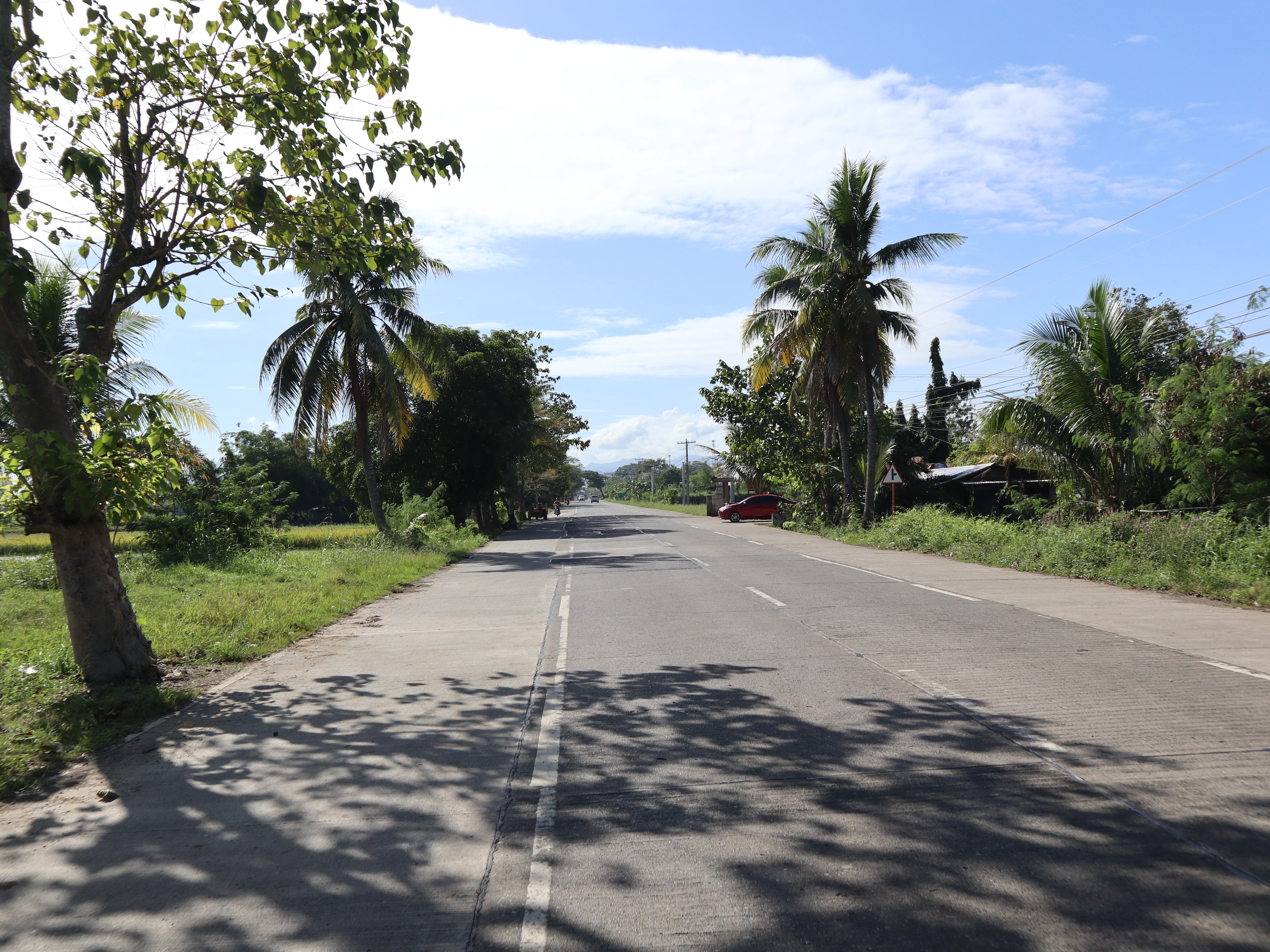
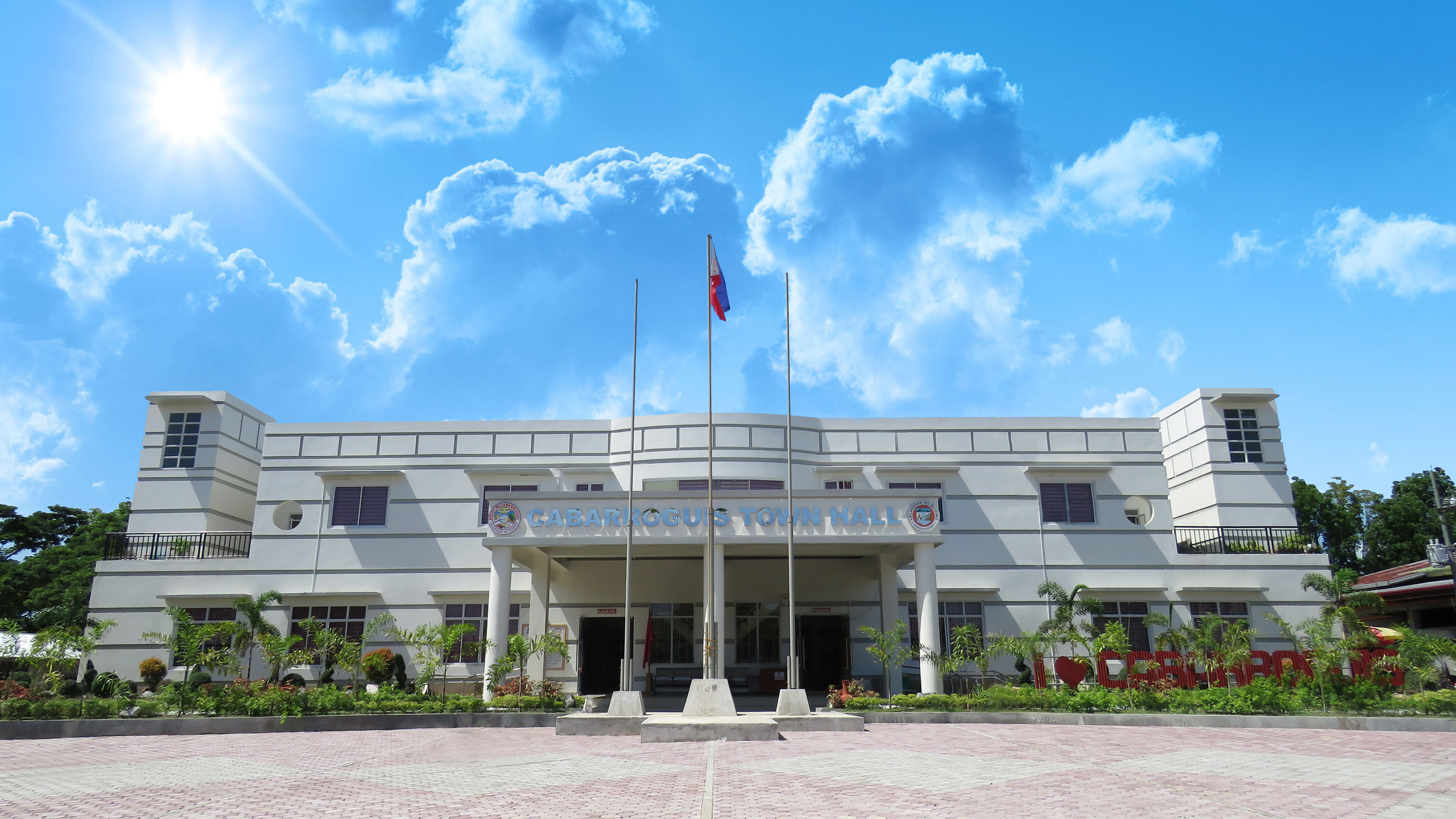
- (from top: left to right) Part of Cagayan River in Quirino, Aerial view of Maddela, Quirino Provincial Capitol, Cordon-Diffun-Maddela-Aurora Road and Cabarroguis Town Hall

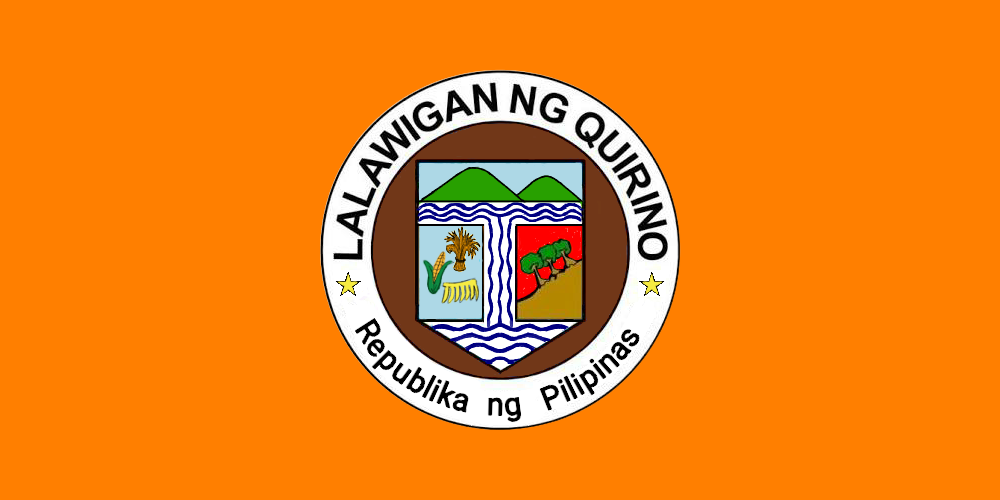
- Flag Seal
- Nickname: Forest Heartland of Cagayan Valley
- Location within the Philippines
- Interactive map of Quirino
- Coordinates: 16°17′N 121°35′E
- Country: Philippines
- Region: Cagayan Valley
- Founded: June 18, 1966
- Named for: Elpidio Quirino
- Capital: Cabarroguis
- Largest Municipality: Diffun

Government
  - Type: Sangguniang Panlalawigan
  - Governor: Julius Caesar Vaquilar (Partido Federal ng Pilipinas)
  - Vice Governor: Lilybeth H. Yogyog, MD (Independent)
  - Representative: Midy Cua (Lakas–CMD)
  - Legislature: Quirino Provincial Board
  - Electorate: 130,307 voters (2025)

Area
  - Total: 2,319.66 km^{2} (895.63 sq mi)
  - Rank: 54th out of 82
- Highest elevation (Mount Dialanese): 1,808 m (5,932 ft)

Population (2024 census)
  - Total: 210,841
  - Rank: 73rd out of 82
  - Density: 90.8931/km^{2} (235.412/sq mi)
  - Rank: 72nd out of 82
  - Households: 43,161
- Demonyms: Quirino; Quirinian

Divisions
  - Independent cities: 0
  - Component cities: 0
  - Municipalities: 6: Aglipay; Cabarroguis; Diffun; Maddela; Nagtipunan; Saguday
  - Barangays: 132
  - Districts: Legislative district of Quirino

Economy
  - Income class: 1st provincial income class
  - Poverty incidence: 6.7% (2023)
  - Revenue: ₱ 1,699 million (2024)
  - Assets: ₱ 5,436 million (2024)
  - Expenditure: ₱ 1,627 million (2024)
  - Liabilities: ₱ 1,149 million (2024)
- Time zone: UTC+8 (PHT)
- PSGC: 0205700000
- IDD : area code: +63 (0)78
- ISO 3166 code: PH-QUI
- Spoken languages: Ilocano; Ifugao; Bugkalot; Pangasinan; Kankana-ey; Tagalog; English
- Website: www.quirinoprovince.org

Quirino, officially the Province of Quirino (Ilocano: Probinsia ti Quirino; Tagalog: Lalawigan ng Quirino), is a landlocked province in the Philippines located in the Cagayan Valley region in Luzon. Its capital is Cabarroguis while Diffun is the most populous in the province. It is named after Elpidio Quirino, the sixth President of the Philippines.

The province borders Aurora to the southeast, Nueva Vizcaya to the west, and Isabela to the north. Quirino used to be part of the province of Nueva Vizcaya, until it became a sub-province in 1966, then it was separated in 1972.

== History ==
=== Early history ===
Long before its formal creation as an independent province, Quirino was the forest region of the province of Nueva Vizcaya, inhabited by tribal groups known as the Negritos. They roamed the hinterlands and built their huts at the heart of the jungle. Aside from the Negritos, the area was also inhabited by Ilongot people, who were feared for their headhunting raids against enemy tribes and Spanish-controlled settlements. Throughout the period of Spanish colonization, the province was one of the few remaining unconquered areas in the Philippines due to its remoteness, having only seen a Spanish military expedition in 1848 and the brief presence of Spanish missionaries in 1891.

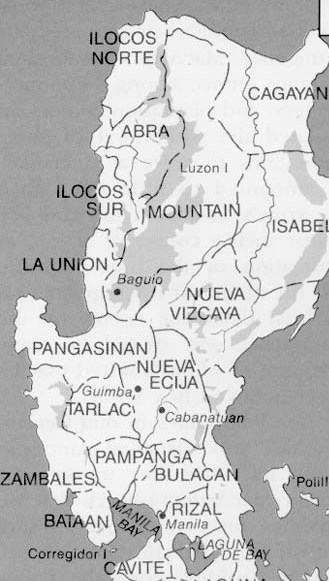
An old map showing the current territories of Quirino as part of Nueva Vizcaya

=== Colonial era ===
During the American period, the territory of Quirino was administered by the province of Isabela before Congressman Leon Cabarroguis of Nueva Vizcaya pushed for its return to Nueva Vizcaya by authoring Republic Act No. 236, which was signed into law in 1948.

=== Establishment as a Subprovince ===
On June 18, 1966, Republic Act No. 4734 was enacted, constituting the municipalities of Diffun, Saguday, Aglipay, and Maddela, all from Nueva Vizcaya province, into a new sub-province to be known as "Quirino", named after the late Philippine President Elpidio Quirino. The reasons for naming it for Elpidio Quirino are the Ilocano settlers in the area and he created the neighboring province Aurora sub-province of Quezon in 1951 through Republic Act No. 648 under his presidency.

On June 21, 1969, Republic Act No. 5554 was enacted, amending RA 4734, and creating the municipality of Cabarroguis (now the provincial capital town), which was taken from portions of Diffun, Saguday, and Aglipay.

=== Martial law era ===
==== Social Unrest in the early 1970s ====
The closing months of the first term of President Ferdinand Marcos marked a period of turmoil and change in the Philippines, as well as in the localities which would later become the Province of Quirino. During his bid to be the first Philippine president to be re-elected for a second term, Ferdinand Marcos launched an unprecedented number of public works projects that caused the Philippine economy to take a sudden downwards turn known as the 1969 Philippine balance of payments crisis, which led to a period of economic difficulty and social unrest.

==== Proclamation of Martial Law (1971-1981) ====
With only a year left in his last constitutionally allowed term as president, Ferdinand Marcos placed the Philippines under martial law in September 1972 and thus retained the position for fourteen more years as a dictator. This period in Philippine history is remembered for the Marcos administration's record of human rights abuses, particularly targeting political opponents, student activists, journalists, religious workers, farmers, and others who fought against the Marcos dictatorship.

In Quirino, one of the most significant events of this period were the logging concessions in the areas of the Sierra Madre region awarded to various Marcos cronies, which marked the beginning of widespread deforestation and other environmental problems in the province.

=== Establishment of Quirino as a separate province (1971-1972) ===
Despite so much social unrest happening at this time, this was the period in which the efforts of Quirino's legislators finally managed to see its establishment as a separate province.

==== Passage of Republic Act No. 6394 ====
Republic Act No. 6394, authored by then-Congressman Leonardo B. Perez (Nueva Vizcaya–Lone), was passed on September 10, 1971, further amending RA 5554 and separating the sub-province of Quirino from its mother province, Nueva Vizcaya, constituting it into a regular province.

==== Formalization of establishment ====
The province of Quirino was formally established on February 10, 1972, upon the assumption to office of the first elected provincial and municipal officials headed by Dionisio Sarandi as Provincial Governor.

==== Creation of Nagtipunan ====
On February 25, 1983, Batas Pambansa Blg. 345 was enacted, creating within Quirino the municipality of Nagtipunan, a division of the municipality of Maddela.

=== 1986 snap election ===
When the 1986 snap election came along, Quirino was noted as a site of political violence with the murder of UNIDO opposition party organizers Francisco Laurella and Fernando Pastor Sr., and Pastor's son Fernando Pastor Jr., later attributed to Marcos party-mate and Quirino province assemblyman Orlando Dulay, who was convicted of the three murders in 1990.

=== Contemporary history ===
Environmental protection efforts led to the creation of important protected areas in Quirino. The Northern Sierra Madre Natural Park was created in 2001, and the Quirino Protected Landscape (QPL) was proclaimed under the NIPAS framework on February 3, 2004.

== Geography ==
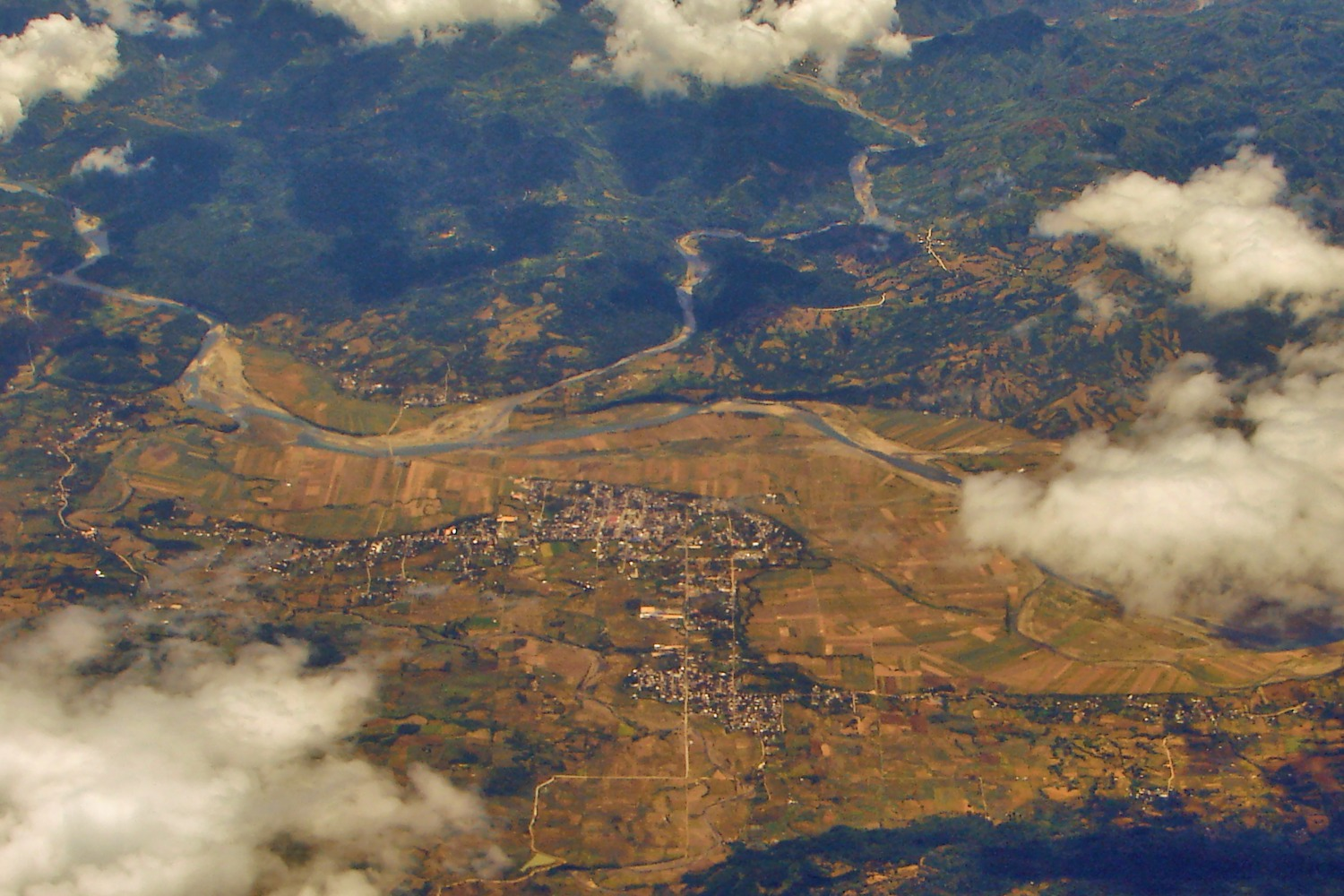
A section of the Cagayan River (lower river in the picture) beside the town of Maddela

Quirino covers a total area of 3,323.47 square kilometers (1,283.20 sq mi) occupying the southeastern section of the Cagayan Valley region. A landlocked province, it is situated within the upper portion of the Cagayan River basin and bounded by Isabela on the north, Aurora on the east and southeast, and Nueva Vizcaya on the west and southwest.

The Sierra Madre mountain range provides a natural barrier on the eastern and southern border of the province and the Namamparang Range on the western part. The province is generally mountainous, with about 80 percent of the total land area covered by mountains and highlands. A large portion of the province lies within the Quirino Protected Landscape.

=== Climate ===
The province has a mean annual temperature of 33.6 °C (92.5 °F). June is generally the warmest month and the wettest months are March to August, with the rest of the year being neither too dry nor too wet. Heavy, sustained rainfall occurs from September to November.

Climate data for Quirino
Month	Jan	Feb	Mar	Apr	May	Jun	Jul	Aug	Sep	Oct	Nov	Dec	Year
Mean daily maximum °C (°F)	27.4 (81.3)	28.4 (83.1)	29.6 (85.3)	31.4 (88.5)	32.2 (90.0)	32.6 (90.7)	32.0 (89.6)	32.2 (90.0)	32.0 (89.6)	31.0 (87.8)	29.6 (85.3)	27.9 (82.2)	30.5 (86.9)
Mean daily minimum °C (°F)	20.0 (68.0)	20.3 (68.5)	21.4 (70.5)	22.6 (72.7)	23.5 (74.3)	23.9 (75.0)	24.0 (75.2)	23.9 (75.0)	23.5 (74.3)	23.0 (73.4)	22.4 (72.3)	20.8 (69.4)	22.4 (72.4)
Average rainy days	15	12	12	9	13	13	15	14	16	14	18	15	166
Source: Storm247

=== Administrative divisions ===
Quirino comprises six municipalities, all encompassed by a single legislative district.

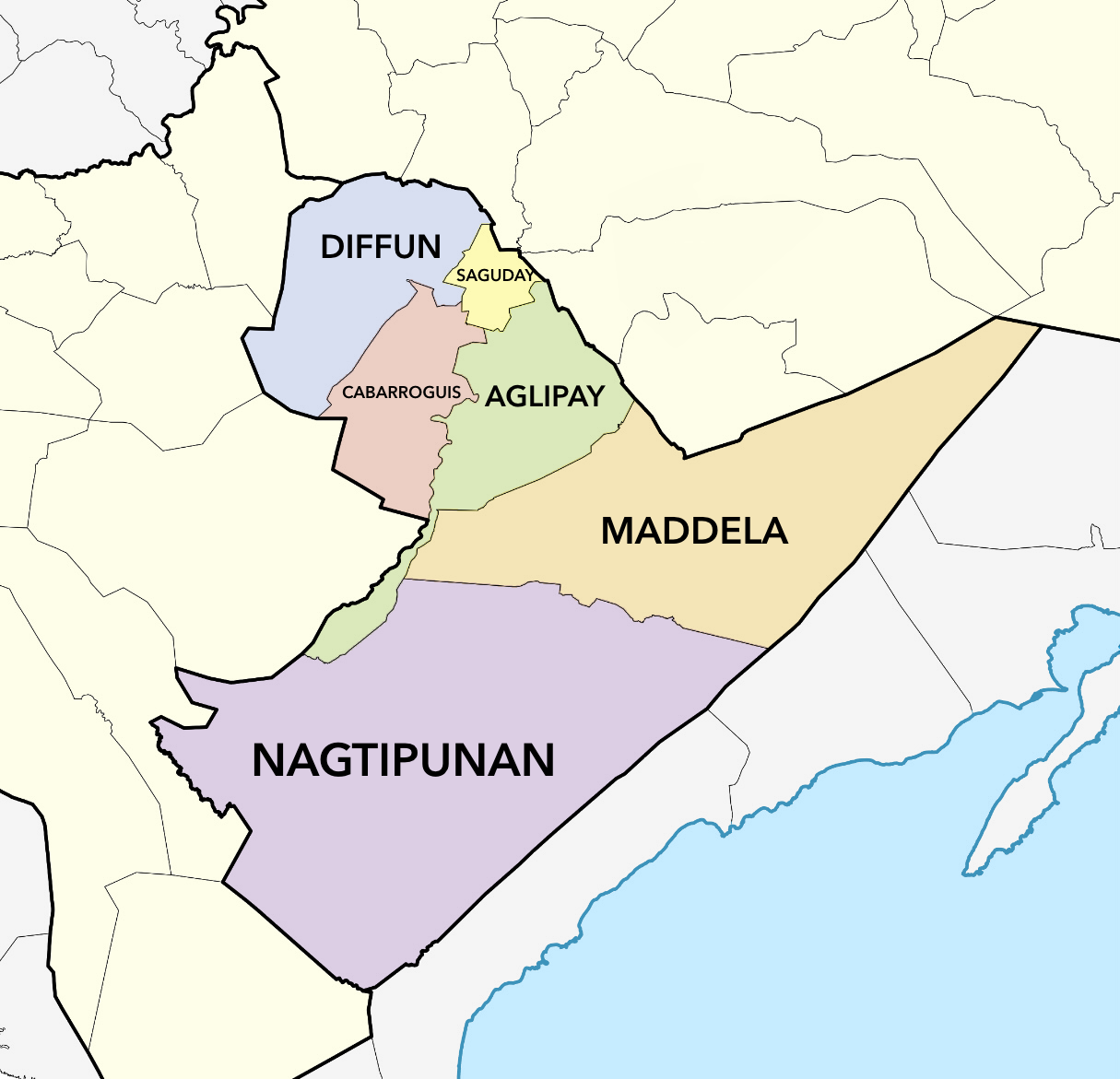
Map of Quirino's municipalities

Municipality (Note: The globe icon marks the town center.)		Population			±% p.a.	Area		Density (2020)		Barangay
		(2020)		(2015)		km^{2}	sq mi	/km^{2}	/sq mi	
Aglipay		15.1%	30,714	27,787	+1.93%	161.70	62.43	190	490	25
Cabarroguis	†	16.5%	33,533	30,582	+1.77%	260.20	100.46	130	340	17
Diffun		27.5%	56,102	52,569	+1.25%	320.10	123.59	180	470	33
Maddela		20.1%	40,943	38,499	+1.18%	918.57	354.66	45	120	32
Nagtipunan		12.5%	25,399	23,484	+1.50%	1,607.40	620.62	42	110	16
Saguday		8.4%	17,137	16,070	+1.23%	55.50	21.43	330	850	9
Total			203,828	188,991	+1.45%	3,323.47	895.63	88	230	132
	† Provincial capital					Municipality				

=== Barangays ===
The six municipalities of the province comprise a total of 132 barangays, with Gundaway (Poblacion) in Cabarroguis as the most populous in 2010, and Rang-ayan in Aglipay as the least.

== Demographics ==
Population census of Quirino
Year	Pop.	±% p.a.
1939	3,923	—
1948	2,520	−4.80%
1960	24,266	+20.77%
1970	49,767	+7.44%
1975	65,763	+5.75%
1980	83,230	+4.82%
1990	114,132	+3.21%
1995	131,119	+2.63%
2000	148,575	+2.72%
2007	163,610	+1.34%
2010	176,786	+2.86%
2015	188,991	+1.28%
2020	203,828	+1.60%
2024	210,841	+0.82%
Source: Philippine Statistics Authority

The population of Quirino in the 2024 census was 210,841 people, with a density of 63 inhabitants per square kilometre or 160 inhabitants per square mile.

Quirino has the largest Igorot population next to its mother province Nueva Vizcaya outside the Cordillera region.

=== Languages ===
The main languages are Ilocano and Ifugao. Other languages are Bugkalot, Pangasinan, Kankana-ey, Tagalog, and English. As Quirino was part of Provincia de Cagayan which is the predecessor of Cagayan Valley, a few residents speak Ibanag, which was the lingua franca of Provincia de Cagayan before it was replaced by Ilocano.

=== Religion ===
Quirino is predominantly Roman Catholic with 54 percent adherence while Evangelicals and United Methodist Church serve as significant minorities with up to 20% of the population. Some people still practice indigenous beliefs. Other religions such as the Iglesia ni Cristo (forming more than 9% of the province population), mainline Protestant and Aglipayan are also well represented. Other religious groups are also have some minor adherents such as Islam.

== Economy ==
Poverty incidence of Quirino (%)

Source: Philippine Statistics Authority

Agriculture is the main industry in the province, with rice and corn as major crops. These supply the demand of neighboring provinces and the metropolis. It is the leading producer of banana in the Cagayan Valley region. Banana as well as banana chips are major products sold in Metro Manila and Pampanga. Small scale industries like furniture making, basketry, rattan craft, and dried flower production are prevalent.

== Government ==
Elected officials of Quirino Provincial Council (2025–2028)
District representative
Midy N. Cua
Provincial governor
Julius Caesar Vaquilar
Provincial vice governor
Lilybeth H. Yogyog, MD
Provincial board
1st District	Babylyn G. Reyes	Marlo S. Guillermo	Martin Bulayo Sr.	Roseller A. Escobar	
2nd District	Linda G. Dacmay	Tomas L. Baccac Sr.	Celso J. Albano	Roy A. Saladino	Alegre M. Ylanan
Non Partisan Members
