= Mayors for Good Governance =

Philippine anti-corruption organization

- Abbreviation: M4GG
- Formation: August 24, 2023; 3 years ago
- Convenors: Joy Belmonte; Sitti Hataman; Benjamin Magalong; Vico Sotto

Mayors for Good Governance (abbreviated to M4GG) is a coalition of incumbent mayors of different cities and municipalities in the Philippines. It was established in August 2023 when over 100 mayors signed a manifesto committing to "uphold the principles of good governance" and serve the best interests of their constituents. According to its official social media account, M4GG is a movement "committed to fighting corruption and building resilient, future-ready communities through empowered local governments that put people's welfare above politics and power."

== Leadership ==
=== Current convenors ===
Mayor	Constituency	Since
Joy Belmonte	Quezon City	August 24, 2023
Sitti Djalia Hataman	Isabela, Basilan	August 24, 2023
Benjamin Magalong	Baguio	August 24, 2023
Vico Sotto	Pasig	October 13, 2023

=== Former convenors ===
The following mayors were former convenors:

- Rommel Arnado (Kauswagan, Lanao del Norte) (August 24, 2023 – June 30, 2025)
- Felipe Remollo (Dumaguete) (August 24, 2023 – June 30, 2025)
- Marcelino Teodoro (Marikina) (August 24, 2023 – June 30, 2025)

== Membership ==
As per M4GG's Facebook page, all new members begin under observer status and will be promoted to member status once they complete the minimum participation requirements.

Mayor	Constituency
Aries Lim	Talavera, Nueva Ecija
Leni Robredo	Naga, Camarines Sur
Wes Gatchalian	Valenzuela
Wendah Dolor	Bauan, Batangas
Chris Evert Tadeo-Leynes	Umingan, Pangasinan
EK Almero	Mamburao, Occidental Mindoro
Alma Lomibao	Sison, Pangasinan
Katkat Suan	Allen, Northern Samar
Lally Belmonte	Zaragoza, Nueva Ecija
Alex Acuzar	Samal, Bataan
Bai Princess Sakaluran	Isulan, Sultan Kudarat
Queen Alarva	Pila, Laguna
Najie Gapangada	San Pablo, Laguna
LA Ruanto	Infanta, Quezon
Bong Palma	San Vicente, Camarines Norte
Richard Inciong	Victoria, Oriental Mindoro
Jojo Francisco Jr.	Labo, Camarines Norte
Bobit Paredes	Tinambac, Camarines Sur
Teresita Ong	Gloria, Oriental Mindoro
Jerwin Dimapilis	Roxas, Oriental Mindoro
Bianca Requinto	Estancia, Iloilo
Galay Polizon-Lanete	Tagbina, Surigao del Sur
Amos Cabahug	Balamban, Cebu
Lahar Ayuban	Loay, Bohol
Divine Taucan-Anghad	San Pablo, Zamboanga del Sur
Raisa Langkuno	Paglat, Maguindanao del Sur
Odjie Balayman	Pandag, Maguindanao del Sur
Runie Jamora	Leon B. Postigo, Zamboanga del Norte
Tony Bagasao	Bayombong, Nueva Vizcaya
Julie Ann Macasaet	Real, Quezon
Dante Eslabon	Sigma, Capiz
Paolo Teves	Baras, Catanduanes
Jason Ortizo	San Francisco, Southern Leyte
Ays Avellano-Canimo	Alabat, Quezon
Mayette Javellana-Yao	Bago City, Negros Occidental
Mac Sayson	Libon, Albay
Lisa Ermita-Abad	Balayan, Batangas
PJ Untaran	San Jose de Buenavista, Antique
Venchie Aguilar	Agdangan, Quezon
Susan Yap	Tarlac City
Kito Altarejos	San Jacinto, Masbate
Jappy de Dios	Anao, Tarlac
Al Reyes	Mabitac, Laguna
Irvin Dy	Julita, Leyte
Son Marfil	Libmanan, Camarines Sur
Nookie Bombales	Bacacay, Albay
Belen Raga	Lumban, Laguna
Rommel Magbitang	Naic, Cavite
JunB Bantug	Victorias, Negros Occidental
Marivic Gayeta	Sariaya, Quezon
