= List of cities and municipalities in the Philippines =

This is a complete list of cities and municipalities in the Philippines. The Philippines is administratively divided into 82 provinces (Filipino: lalawigan). These, together with the National Capital Region, are further subdivided into cities (lungsod) and municipalities (bayan).

Cities are classified under the Local Government Code of 1991 (Republic Act No. 7160) into three categories: highly urbanized cities, independent component cities, and component cities. Cities are governed by their own municipal charters in addition to the Local Government Code of 1991, which specifies their administrative structure and powers. They are given a bigger share of the Internal Revenue Allotment (IRA) compared to regular municipalities.

As of June 30, 2024, there are 149 cities (33 highly urbanized, 5 independent component, 111 component) and 1,493 municipalities encompassing the country. There are a total of 1,642 cities and municipalities in the Philippines.

by province (only useful when the list is sorted alphabetically by province; default)
Abra
Agusan del Norte
Agusan del Sur
Aklan
Albay
Antique
Apayao
Aurora
Basilan
Bataan
Batanes
Batangas
Benguet
Biliran
Bohol
Bukidnon
Bulacan
Cagayan
Camarines Norte
Camarines Sur
Camiguin
Capiz
Catanduanes
Cavite
Cebu
Cotabato
Davao de Oro
Davao del Norte
Davao del Sur
Davao Occidental
Davao Oriental
Dinagat Islands
Eastern Samar
Guimaras
Ifugao
Ilocos Norte
Ilocos Sur
Iloilo
Isabela
Kalinga
La Union
Laguna
Lanao del Norte
Lanao del Sur
Leyte
Maguindanao del Norte
Maguindanao del Sur
Marinduque
Masbate
Metro Manila
Misamis Occidental
Misamis Oriental
Mountain Province
Negros Occidental
Negros Oriental
Northern Samar
Nueva Ecija
Nueva Vizcaya
Occidental Mindoro
Oriental Mindoro
Palawan
Pampanga
Pangasinan
Quezon
Quirino
Rizal
Romblon
Samar
Sarangani
Siquijor
Sorsogon
South Cotabato
Southern Leyte
Sultan Kudarat
Sulu
Surigao del Norte
Surigao del Sur
Tarlac
Tawi-Tawi
Zambales
Zamboanga del Norte
Zamboanga del Sur
Zamboanga Sibugay

Cities with provinces in italics indicate that the city is administered independently of the province with which they are traditionally grouped. Metro Manila (NCR) is not a province but is included for comparative purposes. Under Class, Mun indicates municipalities, CC component cities, ICC independent component cities, and HUC highly urbanized cities. Cells with thick borders mark official (de jure) provincial capitals; cities or municipalities marked with a dagger (†) are the province's largest settlement; a double dagger (‡) marks the country's largest city; and a yellow cell marks the national capital.

City or municipality	Population (2024)	Area (km^{2}) (Note: All land area figures were taken from the Philippine Statistics Authority unless otherwise noted.)	PD (2024)	Brgy.	Class	Province
Bangued†	48,331	105.70	457.25	31	Mun	Abra
Boliney	3,778	216.92	17.42	8	Mun	Abra
Bucay	17,775	102.16	173.99	21	Mun	Abra
Bucloc	2,264	63.77	35.50	4	Mun	Abra
Daguioman	1,773	114.37	15.50	4	Mun	Abra
Danglas	4,372	156.02	28.02	7	Mun	Abra
Dolores	11,967	47.45	252.20	15	Mun	Abra
La Paz	16,014	51.41	311.50	12	Mun	Abra
Lacub	3,649	295.30	12.36	6	Mun	Abra
Lagangilang	14,577	101.44	143.70	17	Mun	Abra
Lagayan	5,154	215.97	23.86	5	Mun	Abra
Langiden	3,457	116.29	29.73	6	Mun	Abra
Licuan-Baay	4,301	256.42	16.77	11	Mun	Abra
Luba	6,402	148.27	43.18	8	Mun	Abra
Malibcong	4,167	283.17	14.72	12	Mun	Abra
Manabo	11,087	110.95	99.93	11	Mun	Abra
Peñarrubia	7,003	38.29	182.89	9	Mun	Abra
Pidigan	12,058	49.15	245.33	15	Mun	Abra
Pilar	10,498	66.10	158.82	19	Mun	Abra
Sallapadan	6,328	128.62	49.20	9	Mun	Abra
San Isidro	4,771	48.07	99.25	9	Mun	Abra
San Juan	10,777	64.08	168.18	19	Mun	Abra
San Quintin	5,963	66.59	89.55	6	Mun	Abra
Tayum	14,808	61.14	242.20	11	Mun	Abra
Tineg	5,059	744.80	6.79	10	Mun	Abra
Tubo	4,941	409.87	12.06	10	Mun	Abra
Villaviciosa	5,674	102.93	55.12	8	Mun	Abra
Buenavista	70,691	475.61	148.63	25	Mun	Agusan del Norte
Butuan†	385,530	816.62	472.10	86	HUC	Agusan del Norte
Cabadbaran	82,343	214.44	383.99	31	CC	Agusan del Norte
Carmen	23,304	311.02	74.93	8	Mun	Agusan del Norte
Jabonga	25,937	293	88.52	15	Mun	Agusan del Norte
Kitcharao	22,671	171.92	131.87	11	Mun	Agusan del Norte
Las Nieves	32,402	582.69	55.61	20	Mun	Agusan del Norte
Magallanes	22,780	44.31	514.11	8	Mun	Agusan del Norte
Nasipit	46,382	144.4	321.20	19	Mun	Agusan del Norte
Remedios T. Romualdez	17,250	79.15	217.94	8	Mun	Agusan del Norte
Santiago	33,877	275.61	122.92	9	Mun	Agusan del Norte
Tubay	26,463	138.09	191.64	13	Mun	Agusan del Norte
Bayugan†	110,313	688.77	160.16	43	CC	Agusan del Sur
Bunawan	50,999	512.16	99.58	10	Mun	Agusan del Sur
Esperanza	59,065	1,355.48	43.57	47	Mun	Agusan del Sur
La Paz	29,096	1,481.12	19.64	15	Mun	Agusan del Sur
Loreto	43,761	1,462.74	29.92	17	Mun	Agusan del Sur
Prosperidad	90,162	505.15	178.49	32	Mun	Agusan del Sur
Rosario	51,207	385.05	132.99	11	Mun	Agusan del Sur
San Francisco	79,718	392.53	203.09	27	Mun	Agusan del Sur
San Luis	36,264	950.5	38.15	25	Mun	Agusan del Sur
Santa Josefa	24,667	341.8	72.17	11	Mun	Agusan del Sur
Sibagat	33,271	567.82	58.59	24	Mun	Agusan del Sur
Talacogon	37,744	405.25	93.14	16	Mun	Agusan del Sur
Trento	51,179	555.7	92.10	16	Mun	Agusan del Sur
Veruela	43,085	385.45	111.78	20	Mun	Agusan del Sur
Altavas	26,181	109.05	240.08	14	Mun	Aklan
Balete	30,310	118.93	254.86	10	Mun	Aklan
Banga	41,188	84.53	487.26	30	Mun	Aklan
Batan	33,932	79.22	428.33	20	Mun	Aklan
Buruanga	19,878	88.50	224.61	15	Mun	Aklan
Ibajay	53,399	158.90	336.05	35	Mun	Aklan
Kalibo†	93,218	50.75	1,836.81	16	Mun	Aklan
Lezo	16,200	23.40	692.31	12	Mun	Aklan
Libacao	28,525	254.98	111.87	24	Mun	Aklan
Madalag	19,043	269.60	70.63	25	Mun	Aklan
Makato	30,650	64.60	474.46	18	Mun	Aklan
Malay	64,723	66.01	980.50	17	Mun	Aklan
Malinao	24,971	186.01	134.25	23	Mun	Aklan
Nabas	41,568	96.82	429.33	20	Mun	Aklan
New Washington	49,204	66.69	737.80	16	Mun	Aklan
Numancia	37,428	28.84	1,297.78	17	Mun	Aklan
Tangalan	24,004	74.59	321.81	15	Mun	Aklan
Bacacay	72,298	122.13	591.98	56	Mun	Albay
Camalig	73,087	130.90	558.34	50	Mun	Albay
Daraga	138,000	118.64	1,163.18	54	Mun	Albay
Guinobatan	84,420	244.43	345.37	44	Mun	Albay
Jovellar	17,538	105.40	166.39	23	Mun	Albay
Legazpi†	210,616	153.70	1,370.31	70	CC	Albay
Libon	72,135	222.76	323.82	47	Mun	Albay
Ligao	119,779	246.75	485.43	55	CC	Albay
Malilipot	41,066	44.13	930.57	18	Mun	Albay
Malinao	49,570	107.50	461.12	29	Mun	Albay
Manito	26,425	107.40	246.04	15	Mun	Albay
Oas	64,890	263.61	246.16	53	Mun	Albay
Pio Duran	48,713	133.70	364.35	33	Mun	Albay
Polangui	89,344	145.30	614.89	44	Mun	Albay
Rapu-Rapu	36,281	155.30	233.62	34	Mun	Albay
Santo Domingo	37,586	51.22	733.81	23	Mun	Albay
Tabaco	140,779	117.14	1,201.80	47	CC	Albay
Tiwi	56,871	105.76	537.74	25	Mun	Albay
Anini-y	22,713	66.17	343.25	23	Mun	Antique
Barbaza	24,925	154.36	161.47	39	Mun	Antique
Belison	14,433	19.78	729.68	11	Mun	Antique
Bugasong	36,060	203.71	177.02	27	Mun	Antique
Caluya	42,895	132.13	324.64	18	Mun	Antique
Culasi	46,442	228.56	203.19	44	Mun	Antique
Hamtic	54,455	113.03	481.77	47	Mun	Antique
Laua-an	28,177	100.72	279.76	40	Mun	Antique
Libertad	18,685	97.00	192.63	19	Mun	Antique
Pandan	37,325	113.98	327.47	34	Mun	Antique
Patnongon	40,070	167.92	238.63	36	Mun	Antique
San Jose de Buenavista†	69,522	48.56	1,431.67	28	Mun	Antique
San Remigio	36,170	406.98	88.87	45	Mun	Antique
Sebaste	19,365	111.64	173.46	10	Mun	Antique
Sibalom	67,155	201.30	333.61	76	Mun	Antique
Tibiao	29,608	177.42	166.88	21	Mun	Antique
Tobias Fornier	34,411	112.12	306.91	50	Mun	Antique
Valderrama	20,762	273.79	75.83	22	Mun	Antique
Calanasan	12,176	1,256.15	9.69	18	Mun	Apayao
Conner†	28,360	694.30	40.85	21	Mun	Apayao
Flora	18,271	324.40	56.32	16	Mun	Apayao
Kabugao	16,425	935.12	17.56	21	Mun	Apayao
Luna	21,630	606.04	35.69	22	Mun	Apayao
Pudtol	15,676	401.02	39.09	22	Mun	Apayao
Santa Marcela	14,049	196.32	71.56	13	Mun	Apayao
Baler	44,684	92.55	482.81	13	Mun	Aurora
Casiguran	26,855	715.43	37.54	24	Mun	Aurora
Dilasag	17,536	306.25	57.26	11	Mun	Aurora
Dinalungan	12,552	316.85	39.61	9	Mun	Aurora
Dingalan	29,286	304.55	96.16	11	Mun	Aurora
Dipaculao	33,597	361.64	92.90	25	Mun	Aurora
Maria Aurora†	45,972	426.19	107.87	40	Mun	Aurora
San Luis	30,342	623.86	48.64	18	Mun	Aurora
Akbar	27,911	38.76	720.10	9	Mun	Basilan
Al-Barka	30,318	72.58	417.72	16	Mun	Basilan
Hadji Mohammad Ajul	32,806	41.02	799.76	11	Mun	Basilan
Hadji Muhtamad	30,122	173.22	173.89	10	Mun	Basilan
Isabela†	151,297	223.73	676.25	45	CC	Basilan
Lamitan	116,652	354.45	329.11	45	CC	Basilan
Lantawan	48,777	405.04	120.43	25	Mun	Basilan
Maluso	66,817	168.46	396.63	20	Mun	Basilan
Sumisip	55,778	567.60	98.27	29	Mun	Basilan
Tabuan-Lasa	38,964	80.50	484.02	12	Mun	Basilan
Tipo-Tipo	32,734	49.7	658.63	11	Mun	Basilan
Tuburan	30,027	546.00	54.99	10	Mun	Basilan
Ungkaya Pukan	31,041	96.13	322.91	12	Mun	Basilan
Abucay	44,846	79.72	562.54	9	Mun	Bataan
Bagac	32,799	231.20	141.86	14	Mun	Bataan
Balanga	109,931	111.63	984.78	25	CC	Bataan
Dinalupihan	124,188	92.52	1,342.28	46	Mun	Bataan
Hermosa	80,557	157.00	513.10	23	Mun	Bataan
Limay	81,960	103.60	791.12	12	Mun	Bataan
Mariveles†	156,200	153.90	1,014.94	18	Mun	Bataan
Morong	37,024	219.20	168.91	5	Mun	Bataan
Orani	72,941	64.90	1,123.90	29	Mun	Bataan
Orion	63,044	65.41	963.83	23	Mun	Bataan
Pilar	47,107	37.60	1,252.85	19	Mun	Bataan
Samal	40,843	56.30	725.45	14	Mun	Bataan
Basco†	9,647	49.46	195.05	6	Mun	Batanes
Itbayat	2,937	83.13	35.33	5	Mun	Batanes
Ivana	1,368	16.54	82.71	4	Mun	Batanes
Mahatao	1,745	12.90	135.27	4	Mun	Batanes
Sabtang	1,774	40.70	43.59	6	Mun	Batanes
Uyugan	1,466	16.28	90.05	4	Mun	Batanes
Agoncillo	40,662	49.96	813.89	21	Mun	Batangas
Alitagtag	28,033	24.76	1,132.19	19	Mun	Batangas
Balayan	96,939	108.73	891.56	48	Mun	Batangas
Balete	24,202	25.00	968.08	13	Mun	Batangas
Batangas City	358,267	282.96	1,266.14	107	CC	Batangas
Bauan	94,016	53.31	1,763.57	40	Mun	Batangas
Calaca	92,281	114.58	805.38	40	CC	Batangas
Calatagan	60,420	112.00	539.46	25	Mun	Batangas
Cuenca	36,453	58.18	626.56	21	Mun	Batangas
Ibaan	58,673	68.99	850.46	26	Mun	Batangas
Laurel	44,791	71.29	628.29	21	Mun	Batangas
Lemery	94,736	109.80	862.81	46	Mun	Batangas
Lian	56,788	76.80	739.43	19	Mun	Batangas
Lipa†	387,392	209.40	1,850.01	72	CC	Batangas
Lobo	41,251	175.03	235.68	26	Mun	Batangas
Mabini	49,876	44.47	1,121.57	34	Mun	Batangas
Malvar	74,565	33.00	2,259.55	15	Mun	Batangas
Mataasnakahoy	31,912	22.10	1,443.98	16	Mun	Batangas
Nasugbu	141,063	278.51	506.49	42	Mun	Batangas
Padre Garcia	53,526	41.51	1,289.47	18	Mun	Batangas
Rosario	131,365	226.88	579.01	48	Mun	Batangas
San Jose	81,170	53.29	1,523.18	33	Mun	Batangas
San Juan	115,118	273.40	421.06	42	Mun	Batangas
San Luis	36,841	42.56	865.63	26	Mun	Batangas
San Nicolas	24,392	14.37	1,697.43	18	Mun	Batangas
San Pascual	69,419	50.70	1,369.21	29	Mun	Batangas
Santa Teresita	21,742	16.30	1,333.87	17	Mun	Batangas
Santo Tomas	226,772	95.41	2,376.82	30	CC	Batangas
Taal	61,559	29.76	2,068.51	42	Mun	Batangas
Talisay	46,477	28.20	1,648.12	21	Mun	Batangas
Tanauan	209,697	107.16	1,956.86	48	CC	Batangas
Taysan	41,332	93.62	441.49	20	Mun	Batangas
Tingloy	15,866	33.07	479.77	15	Mun	Batangas
Tuy	47,199	94.65	498.67	22	Mun	Batangas
Atok	19,346	214.99	89.99	8	Mun	Benguet
Baguio†	368,426	57.51	6,406.29	129	HUC	Benguet
Bakun	15,399	286.91	53.67	7	Mun	Benguet
Bokod	16,071	274.96	58.45	10	Mun	Benguet
Buguias	45,703	175.88	259.85	14	Mun	Benguet
Itogon	59,736	449.73	132.83	9	Mun	Benguet
Kabayan	15,841	242.69	65.27	13	Mun	Benguet
Kapangan	20,048	164.39	121.95	15	Mun	Benguet
Kibungan	16,884	254.86	66.25	7	Mun	Benguet
La Trinidad	142,925	70.04	2,040.62	16	Mun	Benguet
Mankayan	38,647	130.48	296.19	12	Mun	Benguet
Sablan	12,436	105.63	117.73	8	Mun	Benguet
Tuba	49,268	295.97	166.46	13	Mun	Benguet
Tublay	20,886	102.55	203.67	8	Mun	Benguet
Almeria	18,716	57.46	325.72	13	Mun	Biliran
Biliran	18,721	70.30	266.30	11	Mun	Biliran
Cabucgayan	21,923	54.19	404.56	13	Mun	Biliran
Caibiran	24,444	83.55	292.57	17	Mun	Biliran
Culaba	13,563	73.42	184.73	17	Mun	Biliran
Kawayan	21,422	61.02	351.07	20	Mun	Biliran
Maripipi	6,070	27.83	218.11	15	Mun	Biliran
Naval†	59,236	108.24	547.27	26	Mun	Biliran
Alburquerque	11,489	26.98	425.83	11	Mun	Bohol
Alicia	24,663	114.50	215.40	15	Mun	Bohol
Anda	17,835	61.89	288.17	16	Mun	Bohol
Antequera	14,881	118.60	125.47	21	Mun	Bohol
Baclayon	22,754	34.43	660.88	17	Mun	Bohol
Balilihan	19,747	127.27	155.16	31	Mun	Bohol
Batuan	14,423	79.08	182.38	15	Mun	Bohol
Bien Unido	26,278	27.39	959.40	15	Mun	Bohol
Bilar	18,877	129.71	145.53	19	Mun	Bohol
Buenavista	31,095	96.00	323.91	35	Mun	Bohol
Calape	33,022	75.36	438.19	33	Mun	Bohol
Candijay	30,142	103.26	291.90	21	Mun	Bohol
Carmen	50,249	239.45	209.85	29	Mun	Bohol
Catigbian	23,812	113.33	210.11	22	Mun	Bohol
Clarin	21,318	52.12	409.02	24	Mun	Bohol
Corella	9,889	37.22	265.69	8	Mun	Bohol
Cortes	18,976	27.32	694.58	14	Mun	Bohol
Dagohoy	20,068	77.59	258.64	15	Mun	Bohol
Danao	20,299	162.76	124.72	17	Mun	Bohol
Dauis	53,864	43.33	1,243.11	12	Mun	Bohol
Dimiao	14,894	135.75	109.72	35	Mun	Bohol
Duero	19,136	97.30	196.67	21	Mun	Bohol
Garcia Hernandez	24,450	127.50	191.76	30	Mun	Bohol
Getafe	33,485	120.50	277.88	24	Mun	Bohol
Guindulman	34,660	179.17	193.45	19	Mun	Bohol
Inabanga	49,133	125.63	391.09	50	Mun	Bohol
Jagna	36,674	168.49	217.66	33	Mun	Bohol
Lila	11,450	40.50	282.72	18	Mun	Bohol
Loay	17,957	48.24	372.24	24	Mun	Bohol
Loboc	17,338	57.65	300.75	28	Mun	Bohol
Loon	43,857	125.38	349.79	67	Mun	Bohol
Mabini	28,224	104.57	269.91	22	Mun	Bohol
Maribojoc	22,268	69.08	322.35	22	Mun	Bohol
Panglao	41,760	47.79	873.82	10	Mun	Bohol
Pilar	28,860	120.39	239.72	21	Mun	Bohol
President Carlos P. Garcia	23,858	54.82	435.21	23	Mun	Bohol
Sagbayan	25,329	69.61	363.87	24	Mun	Bohol
San Isidro	10,228	60.04	170.35	12	Mun	Bohol
San Miguel	26,124	123.29	211.89	18	Mun	Bohol
Sevilla	11,425	64.55	176.99	13	Mun	Bohol
Sierra Bullones	26,154	198.87	131.51	22	Mun	Bohol
Sikatuna	7,031	38.22	183.96	10	Mun	Bohol
Tagbilaran†	106,120	36.50	2,907.40	15	CC	Bohol
Talibon	71,450	140.46	508.69	25	Mun	Bohol
Trinidad	37,191	195.30	190.43	20	Mun	Bohol
Tubigon	49,275	81.87	601.87	34	Mun	Bohol
Ubay	82,179	335.06	245.27	44	Mun	Bohol
Valencia	28,535	116.67	244.58	35	Mun	Bohol
Baungon	39,151	328.34	119.24	16	Mun	Bukidnon
Cabanglasan	38,365	243.30	157.69	15	Mun	Bukidnon
Damulog	38,564	244.19	157.93	17	Mun	Bukidnon
Dangcagan	27,128	422.69	64.18	14	Mun	Bukidnon
Don Carlos	73,592	213.72	344.34	29	Mun	Bukidnon
Impasugong	55,901	1,051.17	53.18	13	Mun	Bukidnon
Kadingilan	35,432	171.94	206.07	17	Mun	Bukidnon
Kalilangan	44,108	251.43	175.43	14	Mun	Bukidnon
Kibawe	43,491	304.13	143.00	23	Mun	Bukidnon
Kitaotao	57,364	788.78	72.72	35	Mun	Bukidnon
Lantapan	68,777	328.35	209.46	14	Mun	Bukidnon
Libona	51,555	374.37	137.71	14	Mun	Bukidnon
Malaybalay	195,046	969.19	201.25	46	CC	Bukidnon
Malitbog	28,666	581.85	49.27	11	Mun	Bukidnon
Manolo Fortich	118,075	413.60	285.48	22	Mun	Bukidnon
Maramag	109,864	447.26	245.64	20	Mun	Bukidnon
Pangantucan	60,162	461.72	130.30	19	Mun	Bukidnon
Quezon	114,521	626.86	182.69	31	Mun	Bukidnon
San Fernando	65,494	705.06	92.89	24	Mun	Bukidnon
Sumilao	31,094	196.95	157.88	10	Mun	Bukidnon
Talakag	81,932	786.40	104.19	29	Mun	Bukidnon
Valencia†	223,620	587.29	380.77	31	CC	Bukidnon
Angat	67,862	74.00	917.05	16	Mun	Bulacan
Balagtas	80,221	28.66	2,799.06	9	Mun	Bulacan
Baliwag	174,194	45.05	3,866.68	27	CC	Bulacan
Bocaue	147,755	31.87	4,636.18	19	Mun	Bulacan
Bulakan	83,101	72.90	1,139.93	14	Mun	Bulacan
Bustos	80,565	69.99	1,151.09	14	Mun	Bulacan
Calumpit	122,187	56.25	2,172.21	29	Mun	Bulacan
Doña Remedios Trinidad	30,064	932.96	32.22	8	Mun	Bulacan
Guiguinto	118,173	27.50	4,297.20	14	Mun	Bulacan
Hagonoy	136,673	103.10	1,325.64	26	Mun	Bulacan
Malolos	269,809	67.25	4,012.03	51	CC	Bulacan
Marilao	263,507	33.74	7,809.93	16	Mun	Bulacan
Meycauayan	228,023	32.10	7,103.52	26	CC	Bulacan
Norzagaray	140,697	309.77	454.20	13	Mun	Bulacan
Obando	61,073	52.10	1,172.23	11	Mun	Bulacan
Pandi	162,725	31.20	5,215.54	22	Mun	Bulacan
Paombong	58,453	46.34	1,261.39	14	Mun	Bulacan
Plaridel	120,939	32.44	3,728.08	19	Mun	Bulacan
Pulilan	111,384	39.89	2,792.28	19	Mun	Bulacan
San Ildefonso	123,140	128.71	956.72	36	Mun	Bulacan
San Jose del Monte†	685,688	105.53	6,497.56	59	CC	Bulacan
San Miguel	179,792	231.40	776.97	49	Mun	Bulacan
San Rafael	108,256	152.43	710.20	34	Mun	Bulacan
Santa Maria	322,525	90.92	3,547.35	24	Mun	Bulacan
Abulug	35,347	162.60	217.39	20	Mun	Cagayan
Alcala	41,468	187.20	221.52	25	Mun	Cagayan
Allacapan	35,946	306.80	117.16	27	Mun	Cagayan
Amulung	50,903	242.20	210.17	47	Mun	Cagayan
Aparri	68,368	286.64	238.52	42	Mun	Cagayan
Baggao	90,723	920.60	98.55	48	Mun	Cagayan
Ballesteros	34,562	120.00	288.02	19	Mun	Cagayan
Buguey	32,351	164.50	196.66	30	Mun	Cagayan
Calayan	18,008	164.50	109.47	12	Mun	Cagayan
Camalaniugan	25,629	76.50	335.02	28	Mun	Cagayan
Claveria	32,997	194.80	169.39	41	Mun	Cagayan
Enrile	36,481	184.50	197.73	22	Mun	Cagayan
Gattaran	59,704	707.50	84.39	50	Mun	Cagayan
Gonzaga	41,994	567.43	74.01	25	Mun	Cagayan
Iguig	31,342	108.10	289.94	23	Mun	Cagayan
Lal-lo	48,404	702.80	68.87	35	Mun	Cagayan
Lasam	42,042	213.70	196.73	30	Mun	Cagayan
Pamplona	25,182	173.30	145.31	18	Mun	Cagayan
Peñablanca	50,856	1,193.20	42.62	24	Mun	Cagayan
Piat	25,436	139.60	182.21	18	Mun	Cagayan
Rizal	19,577	124.40	157.37	29	Mun	Cagayan
Sanchez-Mira	26,292	198.80	132.25	18	Mun	Cagayan
Santa Ana	34,595	441.30	78.39	16	Mun	Cagayan
Santa Praxedes	4,643	109.97	42.22	10	Mun	Cagayan
Santa Teresita	19,476	166.98	116.64	13	Mun	Cagayan
Santo Niño	29,066	512.90	56.67	31	Mun	Cagayan
Solana	89,840	234.60	382.95	38	Mun	Cagayan
Tuao	66,147	215.50	306.95	32	Mun	Cagayan
Tuguegarao†	167,297	144.80	1,155.37	49	CC	Cagayan
Basud	43,388	260.28	166.70	29	Mun	Camarines Norte
Capalonga	32,800	290.00	113.10	22	Mun	Camarines Norte
Daet†	106,465	46.00	2,314.46	25	Mun	Camarines Norte
Jose Panganiban	60,626	214.44	282.72	27	Mun	Camarines Norte
Labo	108,319	589.36	183.79	52	Mun	Camarines Norte
Mercedes	53,702	173.69	309.18	26	Mun	Camarines Norte
Paracale	58,391	197.9	295.05	27	Mun	Camarines Norte
San Lorenzo Ruiz	15,072	119.37	126.26	12	Mun	Camarines Norte
San Vicente	11,774	57.49	204.80	9	Mun	Camarines Norte
Santa Elena	42,585	199.35	213.62	19	Mun	Camarines Norte
Talisay	26,371	30.76	857.31	15	Mun	Camarines Norte
Vinzons	45,173	141.43	319.40	19	Mun	Camarines Norte
Baao	61,357	106.63	575.42	30	Mun	Camarines Sur
Balatan	31,069	93.09	333.75	17	Mun	Camarines Sur
Bato	52,021	107.12	485.63	33	Mun	Camarines Sur
Bombon	17,346	28.73	603.76	8	Mun	Camarines Sur
Buhi	78,104	246.65	316.66	38	Mun	Camarines Sur
Bula	75,943	167.64	453.01	33	Mun	Camarines Sur
Cabusao	18,882	46.80	403.46	9	Mun	Camarines Sur
Calabanga	88,918	163.80	542.84	48	Mun	Camarines Sur
Camaligan	25,218	4.68	5,388.46	13	Mun	Camarines Sur
Canaman	35,766	43.27	826.58	24	Mun	Camarines Sur
Caramoan	50,433	276.00	182.73	49	Mun	Camarines Sur
Del Gallego	26,029	208.31	124.95	32	Mun	Camarines Sur
Gainza	11,652	14.75	789.97	8	Mun	Camarines Sur
Garchitorena	29,408	243.80	120.62	23	Mun	Camarines Sur
Goa	71,651	206.18	347.52	34	Mun	Camarines Sur
Iriga	115,306	137.35	839.50	36	CC	Camarines Sur
Lagonoy	57,044	377.90	150.95	38	Mun	Camarines Sur
Libmanan	113,254	342.82	330.36	75	Mun	Camarines Sur
Lupi	33,474	199.12	168.11	38	Mun	Camarines Sur
Magarao	28,197	44.97	627.02	15	Mun	Camarines Sur
Milaor	33,680	33.64	1,001.19	20	Mun	Camarines Sur
Minalabac	51,841	126.10	411.11	25	Mun	Camarines Sur
Nabua	86,458	96.20	898.73	42	Mun	Camarines Sur
Naga†	210,545	84.48	2,492.25	27	HUC	Camarines Sur
Ocampo	49,535	118.33	418.62	25	Mun	Camarines Sur
Pamplona	38,556	80.60	478.36	17	Mun	Camarines Sur
Pasacao	50,708	149.54	339.09	19	Mun	Camarines Sur
Pili	101,668	126.25	805.29	26	Mun	Camarines Sur
Presentacion	23,323	143.80	162.19	18	Mun	Camarines Sur
Ragay	58,843	400.22	147.03	38	Mun	Camarines Sur
Sagñay	37,087	154.76	239.64	19	Mun	Camarines Sur
San Fernando	39,206	71.76	546.35	22	Mun	Camarines Sur
San Jose	44,688	43.07	1,037.57	29	Mun	Camarines Sur
Sipocot	65,286	243.43	268.19	46	Mun	Camarines Sur
Siruma	19,168	141.27	135.68	22	Mun	Camarines Sur
Tigaon	61,790	72.35	854.04	23	Mun	Camarines Sur
Tinambac	69,860	351.62	198.68	44	Mun	Camarines Sur
Catarman	18,186	53.75	338.34	14	Mun	Camiguin
Guinsiliban	6,827	18.52	368.63	7	Mun	Camiguin
Mahinog	14,905	32.55	457.91	13	Mun	Camiguin
Mambajao†	41,782	89.00	469.46	15	Mun	Camiguin
Sagay	13,192	44.13	298.93	9	Mun	Camiguin
Cuartero	28,650	106.58	268.81	22	Mun	Capiz
Dao	34,555	88.64	389.84	20	Mun	Capiz
Dumalag	30,872	109.18	282.76	19	Mun	Capiz
Dumarao	51,633	232.56	222.02	33	Mun	Capiz
Ivisan	32,853	54.2	606.14	15	Mun	Capiz
Jamindan	40,472	412.03	98.23	30	Mun	Capiz
Ma-ayon	42,997	142.32	302.11	32	Mun	Capiz
Mambusao	41,768	136.91	305.08	26	Mun	Capiz
Panay	50,946	116.37	437.79	42	Mun	Capiz
Panitan	44,246	89.88	492.28	26	Mun	Capiz
Pilar	48,789	77.99	625.58	24	Mun	Capiz
Pontevedra	51,956	130.90	396.91	26	Mun	Capiz
President Roxas	32,436	77.88	416.49	22	Mun	Capiz
Roxas†	185,236	95.07	1,948.42	47	CC	Capiz
Sapian	27,377	105.24	260.14	10	Mun	Capiz
Sigma	32,628	101.71	320.79	21	Mun	Capiz
Tapaz	57,684	517.18	111.54	58	Mun	Capiz
Bagamanoc	10,403	80.74	128.85	18	Mun	Catanduanes
Baras	12,992	109.50	118.65	29	Mun	Catanduanes
Bato	21,325	48.62	438.61	27	Mun	Catanduanes
Caramoran	30,124	263.74	114.22	27	Mun	Catanduanes
Gigmoto	8,348	181.82	45.91	9	Mun	Catanduanes
Pandan	20,796	119.90	173.44	26	Mun	Catanduanes
Panganiban	8,947	79.96	111.89	23	Mun	Catanduanes
San Andres	37,157	167.31	222.08	38	Mun	Catanduanes
San Miguel	14,578	129.94	112.19	24	Mun	Catanduanes
Viga	21,364	158.23	135.02	31	Mun	Catanduanes
Virac†	75,135	152.40	493.01	63	Mun	Catanduanes
Alfonso	60,583	66.58	909.93	32	Mun	Cavite
Amadeo	44,190	36.92	1,196.91	26	Mun	Cavite
Bacoor	661,381	46.17	14,324.91	47	CC	Cavite
Carmona	112,140	29.68	3,778.30	14	CC	Cavite
Cavite City	98,673	10.89	9,060.88	84	CC	Cavite
Dasmariñas†	744,511	90.13	8,260.41	75	CC	Cavite
General Emilio Aguinaldo	24,264	42.13	575.93	14	Mun	Cavite
General Mariano Alvarez	176,927	9.40	18,822.02	27	Mun	Cavite
General Trias	482,453	90.01	5,359.99	33	CC	Cavite
Imus	481,949	53.15	9,067.71	97	CC	Cavite
Indang	70,092	74.90	935.81	36	Mun	Cavite
Kawit	123,631	25.15	4,915.75	23	Mun	Cavite
Magallanes	25,826	73.07	353.44	16	Mun	Cavite
Maragondon	41,977	164.61	255.01	27	Mun	Cavite
Mendez	36,518	43.27	843.96	24	Mun	Cavite
Naic	236,978	75.81	3,125.95	30	Mun	Cavite
Noveleta	46,172	16.43	2,810.23	16	Mun	Cavite
Rosario	112,572	7.61	14,792.64	20	Mun	Cavite
Silang	313,145	209.43	1,495.23	64	Mun	Cavite
Tagaytay	87,811	65.00	1,350.94	34	CC	Cavite
Tanza	339,308	78.33	4,331.78	41	Mun	Cavite
Ternate	24,891	59.93	415.33	10	Mun	Cavite
Trece Martires	227,892	39.10	5,828.44	13	CC	Cavite
Alcantara	17,490	35.20	496.88	9	Mun	Cebu
Alcoy	19,207	61.63	311.65	8	Mun	Cebu
Alegria	26,520	89.49	296.35	9	Mun	Cebu
Aloguinsan	34,990	61.92	565.08	15	Mun	Cebu
Argao	78,111	191.50	407.89	45	Mun	Cebu
Asturias	54,777	190.45	287.62	27	Mun	Cebu
Badian	44,626	110.07	405.43	29	Mun	Cebu
Balamban	98,170	333.56	294.31	28	Mun	Cebu
Bantayan	87,394	81.68	1,069.96	25	Mun	Cebu
Barili	82,427	122.21	674.47	42	Mun	Cebu
Bogo	90,187	103.52	871.20	29	CC	Cebu
Boljoon	17,153	117.00	146.61	11	Mun	Cebu
Borbon	40,097	120.94	331.54	19	Mun	Cebu
Carcar	140,308	116.78	1,201.47	15	CC	Cebu
Carmen	60,230	84.78	710.43	21	Mun	Cebu
Catmon	34,608	109.64	315.65	20	Mun	Cebu
Cebu City†	965,332	315.00	3,064.55	80	HUC	Cebu
Compostela	58,178	53.90	1,079.37	17	Mun	Cebu
Consolacion	153,931	37.03	4,156.93	21	Mun	Cebu
Cordova	72,915	17.15	4,251.60	13	Mun	Cebu
Daanbantayan	95,080	92.27	1,030.45	20	Mun	Cebu
Dalaguete	75,937	154.96	490.04	33	Mun	Cebu
Danao	161,307	107.30	1,503.33	42	CC	Cebu
Dumanjug	59,954	85.53	700.97	37	Mun	Cebu
Ginatilan	17,184	70.10	245.14	14	Mun	Cebu
Lapu-Lapu	497,813	58.10	8,568.21	30	HUC	Cebu
Liloan	158,387	45.92	3,449.19	14	Mun	Cebu
Madridejos	42,828	23.95	1,788.23	14	Mun	Cebu
Malabuyoc	20,378	69.27	294.18	14	Mun	Cebu
Mandaue	364,482	34.87	10,452.60	27	HUC	Cebu
Medellin	62,163	73.19	849.34	19	Mun	Cebu
Minglanilla	155,934	65.60	2,377.04	19	Mun	Cebu
Moalboal	37,993	124.86	304.28	15	Mun	Cebu
Naga	138,727	101.97	1,360.47	28	CC	Cebu
Oslob	29,378	134.75	218.02	21	Mun	Cebu
Pilar	12,454	32.42	384.15	13	Mun	Cebu
Pinamungajan	76,568	109.16	701.43	26	Mun	Cebu
Poro	26,908	63.59	423.15	17	Mun	Cebu
Ronda	21,179	57.10	370.91	14	Mun	Cebu
Samboan	20,736	45.16	459.17	15	Mun	Cebu
San Fernando	76,110	69.39	1,096.84	21	Mun	Cebu
San Francisco	61,092	106.93	571.33	15	Mun	Cebu
San Remigio	67,850	95.27	712.19	27	Mun	Cebu
Santa Fe	34,834	28.05	1,241.85	10	Mun	Cebu
Santander	18,669	35.67	523.38	10	Mun	Cebu
Sibonga	54,610	133.45	409.22	25	Mun	Cebu
Sogod	40,746	119.23	341.74	18	Mun	Cebu
Tabogon	42,066	101.35	415.06	25	Mun	Cebu
Tabuelan	29,662	141.13	210.18	12	Mun	Cebu
Talisay	263,832	39.87	6,617.31	22	CC	Cebu
Toledo	206,692	216.28	955.67	38	CC	Cebu
Tuburan	68,307	224.50	304.26	54	Mun	Cebu
Tudela	11,638	33.02	352.45	11	Mun	Cebu
Alamada	71,523	787.50	90.82	17	Mun	Cotabato
Aleosan	38,023	225.44	168.66	19	Mun	Cotabato
Antipas	26,946	552.50	48.77	13	Mun	Cotabato
Arakan	51,584	693.22	74.41	28	Mun	Cotabato
Banisilan	48,013	577.22	83.18	20	Mun	Cotabato
Carmen	79,741	1,110.43	71.81	28	Mun	Cotabato
Kabacan	77,945	448.09	173.95	24	Mun	Cotabato
Kadayangan	26,099	41.60	627.38	7	Mun	Cotabato
Kapalawan	29,191	180.62	161.62	7	Mun	Cotabato
Kidapawan†	160,864	358.47	448.75	40	CC	Cotabato
Libungan	57,776	172.50	334.93	20	Mun	Cotabato
Ligawasan	28,322	111.60	253.78	7	Mun	Cotabato
M'lang	98,646	312.13	316.04	37	Mun	Cotabato
Magpet	55,255	755.36	73.15	32	Mun	Cotabato
Makilala	88,522	343.57	257.65	38	Mun	Cotabato
Malidegao	36,427	115.45	315.52	7	Mun	Cotabato
Matalam	81,610	476.00	171.45	34	Mun	Cotabato
Midsayap	115,735	290.42	398.51	57	Mun	Cotabato
Nabalawag	25,500	86.05	296.34	7	Mun	Cotabato
Old Kaabakan	16,181	117.17	138.10	7	Mun	Cotabato
Pahamuddin	19,262	50.13	384.24	12	Mun	Cotabato
Pigcawayan	53,593	340.11	157.58	40	Mun	Cotabato
Pikit	67,220	604.61	111.18	42	Mun	Cotabato
President Roxas	51,245	618.25	82.89	25	Mun	Cotabato
Tugunan	33,721	102.60	328.66	9	Mun	Cotabato
Tulunan	61,901	343.08	180.43	29	Mun	Cotabato
Compostela	89,224	287.00	310.89	16	Mun	Davao de Oro
Laak	83,632	768.00	108.90	40	Mun	Davao de Oro
Mabini	43,971	400.00	109.93	11	Mun	Davao de Oro
Maco	87,680	342.23	256.20	37	Mun	Davao de Oro
Maragusan	67,759	394.27	171.86	24	Mun	Davao de Oro
Mawab	41,050	136.10	301.62	11	Mun	Davao de Oro
Monkayo†	96,405	609.61	158.14	21	Mun	Davao de Oro
Montevista	46,581	225.00	207.03	20	Mun	Davao de Oro
Nabunturan	85,949	231.30	371.59	28	Mun	Davao de Oro
New Bataan	50,212	553.15	90.77	16	Mun	Davao de Oro
Pantukan	91,312	533.11	171.28	13	Mun	Davao de Oro
Asuncion	62,929	297.39	211.60	20	Mun	Davao del Norte
Braulio E. Dujali	36,092	91.00	396.62	5	Mun	Davao del Norte
Carmen	85,423	166.00	514.60	20	Mun	Davao del Norte
Kapalong	80,731	830.01	97.27	14	Mun	Davao del Norte
New Corella	60,454	263.12	229.76	20	Mun	Davao del Norte
Panabo	211,242	251.23	840.83	40	CC	Davao del Norte
Samal	119,701	301.30	397.28	46	CC	Davao del Norte
Santo Tomas	131,100	221.8	591.07	19	Mun	Davao del Norte
Sawata	27,552	152.49	180.68	13	Mun	Davao del Norte
Tagum†	300,042	195.8	1,532.39	23	CC	Davao del Norte
Talaingod	28,665	656.83	43.64	3	Mun	Davao del Norte
Bansalan	64,816	157.75	410.88	25	Mun	Davao del Sur
Davao City†	1,848,947	2,443.61	756.65	182	HUC	Davao del Sur
Digos	192,063	287.10	668.98	26	CC	Davao del Sur
Hagonoy	58,689	114.28	513.55	21	Mun	Davao del Sur
Kiblawan	53,757	390.07	137.81	30	Mun	Davao del Sur
Magsaysay	57,936	268.09	216.11	22	Mun	Davao del Sur
Malalag	40,280	186.12	216.42	15	Mun	Davao del Sur
Matanao	62,773	202.40	310.14	33	Mun	Davao del Sur
Padada	29,888	83.00	360.10	17	Mun	Davao del Sur
Santa Cruz	104,793	319.91	327.57	18	Mun	Davao del Sur
Sulop	40,134	155.26	258.50	25	Mun	Davao del Sur
Don Marcelino	45,681	407.30	112.16	15	Mun	Davao Occidental
Jose Abad Santos	72,552	600.06	120.91	26	Mun	Davao Occidental
Malita†	118,438	883.37	134.08	30	Mun	Davao Occidental
Santa Maria	58,886	175.00	336.49	22	Mun	Davao Occidental
Sarangani	22,041	97.72	225.55	12	Mun	Davao Occidental
Baganga	59,796	945.50	63.24	18	Mun	Davao Oriental
Banaybanay	46,231	408.52	113.17	14	Mun	Davao Oriental
Boston	15,074	357.03	42.22	8	Mun	Davao Oriental
Caraga	39,630	642.70	61.66	17	Mun	Davao Oriental
Cateel	45,623	545.56	83.63	16	Mun	Davao Oriental
Governor Generoso	63,695	365.75	174.15	20	Mun	Davao Oriental
Lupon	68,717	886.39	77.52	21	Mun	Davao Oriental
Manay	39,271	418.36	93.87	17	Mun	Davao Oriental
Mati†	148,672	588.63	252.57	26	CC	Davao Oriental
San Isidro	35,984	220.44	163.24	16	Mun	Davao Oriental
Tarragona	27,349	300.76	90.93	10	Mun	Davao Oriental
Basilisa†	27,238	92.68	293.89	27	Mun	Dinagat Islands
Cagdianao	18,679	249.48	74.87	14	Mun	Dinagat Islands
Dinagat	10,820	139.94	77.32	12	Mun	Dinagat Islands
Libjo	18,157	180.57	100.55	16	Mun	Dinagat Islands
Loreto	9,940	255.87	38.85	10	Mun	Dinagat Islands
San Jose	26,735	27.80	961.69	12	Mun	Dinagat Islands
Tubajon	8,964	90.00	99.60	9	Mun	Dinagat Islands
Arteche	16,648	169.82	98.03	20	Mun	Eastern Samar
Balangiga	14,473	190.05	76.15	13	Mun	Eastern Samar
Balangkayan	10,014	207.05	48.37	15	Mun	Eastern Samar
Borongan†	71,431	475.00	150.38	61	CC	Eastern Samar
Can-avid	21,942	288.70	76.00	28	Mun	Eastern Samar
Dolores	45,314	308.58	146.85	46	Mun	Eastern Samar
General MacArthur	14,606	117.29	124.53	30	Mun	Eastern Samar
Giporlos	12,974	97.51	133.05	18	Mun	Eastern Samar
Guiuan	52,749	175.49	300.58	60	Mun	Eastern Samar
Hernani	8,296	49.42	167.87	13	Mun	Eastern Samar
Jipapad	8,726	234.80	37.16	13	Mun	Eastern Samar
Lawaan	13,063	162.56	80.36	16	Mun	Eastern Samar
Llorente	18,909	496.07	38.12	33	Mun	Eastern Samar
Maslog	5,438	249.80	21.77	12	Mun	Eastern Samar
Maydolong	15,456	399.63	38.68	20	Mun	Eastern Samar
Mercedes	6,114	23.32	262.18	16	Mun	Eastern Samar
Oras	35,997	188.70	190.76	42	Mun	Eastern Samar
Quinapondan	14,624	83.24	175.68	25	Mun	Eastern Samar
Salcedo	21,335	113.80	187.48	41	Mun	Eastern Samar
San Julian	14,509	150.62	96.33	16	Mun	Eastern Samar
San Policarpo	15,597	78.00	199.96	17	Mun	Eastern Samar
Sulat	15,776	169.75	92.94	18	Mun	Eastern Samar
Taft	18,692	231.27	80.82	24	Mun	Eastern Samar
Buenavista†	54,352	128.26	423.76	36	Mun	Guimaras
Jordan	40,647	126.11	322.31	14	Mun	Guimaras
Nueva Valencia	43,822	137.12	319.59	22	Mun	Guimaras
San Lorenzo	30,266	93.04	325.30	12	Mun	Guimaras
Sibunag	23,787	120.04	198.16	14	Mun	Guimaras
Aguinaldo	20,924	538.05	38.89	16	Mun	Ifugao
Alfonso Lista†	34,810	347.46	100.18	20	Mun	Ifugao
Asipulo	16,088	182.87	87.98	10	Mun	Ifugao
Banaue	20,143	191.20	105.35	18	Mun	Ifugao
Hingyon	9,966	62.02	160.69	12	Mun	Ifugao
Hungduan	8,970	260.30	34.46	9	Mun	Ifugao
Kiangan	17,849	200.00	89.25	14	Mun	Ifugao
Lagawe	19,124	208.91	91.54	20	Mun	Ifugao
Lamut	26,520	159.65	166.11	18	Mun	Ifugao
Mayoyao	15,525	238.05	65.22	27	Mun	Ifugao
Tinoc	18,749	239.70	78.22	12	Mun	Ifugao
Adams	2,279	159.31	14.31	1	Mun	Ilocos Norte
Bacarra	32,734	65.32	501.13	43	Mun	Ilocos Norte
Badoc	32,832	76.68	428.17	31	Mun	Ilocos Norte
Bangui	15,227	112.98	134.78	14	Mun	Ilocos Norte
Banna	19,363	92.73	208.81	20	Mun	Ilocos Norte
Batac	56,781	161.06	352.55	43	CC	Ilocos Norte
Burgos	10,962	128.90	85.04	11	Mun	Ilocos Norte
Carasi	1,775	82.97	21.39	3	Mun	Ilocos Norte
Currimao	12,256	34.08	359.62	23	Mun	Ilocos Norte
Dingras	40,176	96.00	418.50	31	Mun	Ilocos Norte
Dumalneg	3,452	88.48	39.01	4	Mun	Ilocos Norte
Laoag†	112,117	116.08	965.86	80	CC	Ilocos Norte
Marcos	18,105	72.77	248.80	13	Mun	Ilocos Norte
Nueva Era	13,305	515.02	25.83	11	Mun	Ilocos Norte
Pagudpud	25,565	194.90	131.17	16	Mun	Ilocos Norte
Paoay	24,204	76.24	317.47	31	Mun	Ilocos Norte
Pasuquin	30,521	210.54	144.97	33	Mun	Ilocos Norte
Piddig	22,781	216.20	105.37	23	Mun	Ilocos Norte
Pinili	17,705	89.48	197.87	25	Mun	Ilocos Norte
San Nicolas	39,116	40.18	973.52	24	Mun	Ilocos Norte
Sarrat	26,294	57.39	458.16	24	Mun	Ilocos Norte
Solsona	26,249	166.23	157.91	22	Mun	Ilocos Norte
Vintar	35,051	614.35	57.05	33	Mun	Ilocos Norte
Alilem	7,736	119.33	64.83	9	Mun	Ilocos Sur
Banayoyo	7,953	24.63	322.90	14	Mun	Ilocos Sur
Bantay	37,088	76.60	484.18	34	Mun	Ilocos Sur
Burgos	13,026	44.38	293.51	26	Mun	Ilocos Sur
Cabugao	38,981	95.56	407.92	33	Mun	Ilocos Sur
Candon†	61,315	103.28	593.68	42	CC	Ilocos Sur
Caoayan	19,715	17.42	1,131.75	17	Mun	Ilocos Sur
Cervantes	20,065	234.70	85.49	13	Mun	Ilocos Sur
Galimuyod	10,263	34.40	298.34	24	Mun	Ilocos Sur
Gregorio del Pilar	4,385	41.66	105.26	7	Mun	Ilocos Sur
Lidlidda	4,846	33.84	143.20	11	Mun	Ilocos Sur
Magsingal	31,970	84.98	376.21	30	Mun	Ilocos Sur
Nagbukel	5,370	43.12	124.54	12	Mun	Ilocos Sur
Narvacan	46,265	122.21	378.57	34	Mun	Ilocos Sur
Quirino	9,460	240.10	39.40	9	Mun	Ilocos Sur
Salcedo	11,196	103.44	108.24	21	Mun	Ilocos Sur
San Emilio	7,513	141.44	53.12	8	Mun	Ilocos Sur
San Esteban	8,621	19.62	439.40	10	Mun	Ilocos Sur
San Ildefonso	8,213	11.35	723.61	15	Mun	Ilocos Sur
San Juan	26,709	64.37	414.93	32	Mun	Ilocos Sur
San Vicente	13,074	12.60	1,037.62	7	Mun	Ilocos Sur
Santa Catalina	14,319	9.68	1,479.24	9	Mun	Ilocos Sur
Santa Cruz	41,296	88.78	465.15	49	Mun	Ilocos Sur
Santa Lucia	26,200	49.72	526.95	36	Mun	Ilocos Sur
Santa Maria	30,076	63.31	475.06	33	Mun	Ilocos Sur
Santa	15,164	109.10	138.99	26	Mun	Ilocos Sur
Santiago	19,771	46.36	426.47	24	Mun	Ilocos Sur
Santo Domingo	29,372	55.49	529.32	36	Mun	Ilocos Sur
Sigay	2,577	81.55	31.60	7	Mun	Ilocos Sur
Sinait	26,059	65.56	397.48	44	Mun	Ilocos Sur
Sugpon	4,238	57.11	74.21	6	Mun	Ilocos Sur
Suyo	11,051	124.00	89.12	8	Mun	Ilocos Sur
Tagudin	41,606	151.19	275.19	43	Mun	Ilocos Sur
Vigan	54,498	25.12	2,169.51	39	CC	Ilocos Sur
Ajuy	54,100	175.57	308.14	34	Mun	Iloilo
Alimodian	39,814	144.82	274.92	51	Mun	Iloilo
Anilao	30,612	100.31	305.17	21	Mun	Iloilo
Badiangan	27,088	77.50	349.52	31	Mun	Iloilo
Balasan	35,193	54.27	648.48	23	Mun	Iloilo
Banate	33,790	102.89	328.41	18	Mun	Iloilo
Barotac Nuevo	59,184	94.49	626.35	29	Mun	Iloilo
Barotac Viejo	49,736	185.78	267.71	26	Mun	Iloilo
Batad	22,174	53.10	417.59	24	Mun	Iloilo
Bingawan	16,247	85.20	190.69	14	Mun	Iloilo
Cabatuan	62,717	112.90	555.51	68	Mun	Iloilo
Calinog	63,896	274.55	232.73	59	Mun	Iloilo
Carles	74,177	104.05	712.90	33	Mun	Iloilo
Concepcion	45,737	86.12	531.08	25	Mun	Iloilo
Dingle	46,032	98.37	467.95	33	Mun	Iloilo
Dueñas	34,941	90.52	386.00	47	Mun	Iloilo
Dumangas	75,239	128.70	584.61	45	Mun	Iloilo
Estancia	54,882	29.38	1,868.01	25	Mun	Iloilo
Guimbal	35,129	44.61	787.47	33	Mun	Iloilo
Igbaras	32,442	148.72	218.14	46	Mun	Iloilo
Iloilo City†	473,728	78.34	6,047.08	180	HUC	Iloilo
Janiuay	67,509	179.10	376.93	60	Mun	Iloilo
Lambunao	80,724	407.09	198.30	73	Mun	Iloilo
Leganes	36,542	32.20	1,134.84	18	Mun	Iloilo
Lemery	32,836	119.90	273.86	31	Mun	Iloilo
Leon	52,777	140.20	376.44	85	Mun	Iloilo
Maasin	38,761	128.59	301.43	50	Mun	Iloilo
Miagao	68,163	156.80	434.71	119	Mun	Iloilo
Mina	24,145	43.40	556.34	22	Mun	Iloilo
New Lucena	24,785	44.10	562.02	21	Mun	Iloilo
Oton	99,920	86.44	1,155.95	37	Mun	Iloilo
Passi	90,313	251.39	359.25	51	CC	Iloilo
Pavia	74,594	27.15	2,747.48	18	Mun	Iloilo
Pototan	78,919	97.10	812.76	50	Mun	Iloilo
San Dionisio	39,423	127.06	310.27	29	Mun	Iloilo
San Enrique	37,381	110.28	338.96	28	Mun	Iloilo
San Joaquin	52,773	234.84	224.72	85	Mun	Iloilo
San Miguel	31,093	31.97	972.57	24	Mun	Iloilo
San Rafael	18,293	67.05	272.83	9	Mun	Iloilo
Santa Barbara	68,467	131.96	518.85	60	Mun	Iloilo
Sara	55,476	169.02	328.22	42	Mun	Iloilo
Tigbauan	65,657	83.68	784.62	52	Mun	Iloilo
Tubungan	23,083	85.18	270.99	48	Mun	Iloilo
Zarraga	27,852	54.48	511.23	24	Mun	Iloilo
Alicia	74,699	154.10	484.74	34	Mun	Isabela
Angadanan	45,970	204.40	224.90	59	Mun	Isabela
Aurora	37,191	115.56	321.83	33	Mun	Isabela
Benito Soliven	30,682	184.40	166.39	29	Mun	Isabela
Burgos	26,729	73.10	365.65	14	Mun	Isabela
Cabagan	55,445	430.40	128.82	26	Mun	Isabela
Cabatuan	40,223	72.00	558.65	22	Mun	Isabela
Cauayan	143,539	336.40	426.69	65	CC	Isabela
Cordon	46,688	144.00	324.22	26	Mun	Isabela
Delfin Albano	30,860	189.00	163.28	29	Mun	Isabela
Dinapigue	6,116	574.40	10.65	6	Mun	Isabela
Divilacan	5,871	889.49	6.60	12	Mun	Isabela
Echague	91,320	680.80	134.14	64	Mun	Isabela
Gamu	30,850	129.40	238.41	16	Mun	Isabela
Ilagan†	164,020	1,166.26	140.64	91	CC	Isabela
Jones	46,160	670.14	68.88	42	Mun	Isabela
Luna	21,015	45.70	459.85	19	Mun	Isabela
Maconacon	4,252	538.66	7.89	10	Mun	Isabela
Mallig	32,509	133.40	243.70	18	Mun	Isabela
Naguilian	34,520	169.81	203.29	25	Mun	Isabela
Palanan	18,091	880.24	20.55	17	Mun	Isabela
Quezon	28,376	189.90	149.43	15	Mun	Isabela
Quirino	25,205	126.20	199.72	21	Mun	Isabela
Ramon	57,412	135.17	424.74	19	Mun	Isabela
Reina Mercedes	28,222	57.14	493.91	20	Mun	Isabela
Roxas	66,593	184.80	360.35	26	Mun	Isabela
San Agustin	22,228	278.40	79.84	23	Mun	Isabela
San Guillermo	21,043	325.49	64.65	26	Mun	Isabela
San Isidro	27,326	71.90	380.06	13	Mun	Isabela
San Manuel	34,740	112.77	308.06	19	Mun	Isabela
San Mariano	61,876	1,469.50	42.11	36	Mun	Isabela
San Mateo	67,433	120.60	559.15	33	Mun	Isabela
San Pablo	26,462	637.90	41.48	17	Mun	Isabela
Santa Maria	25,919	140.00	185.14	20	Mun	Isabela
Santiago	150,313	255.50	588.31	37	ICC	Isabela
Santo Tomas	25,997	60.70	428.29	27	Mun	Isabela
Tumauini	77,153	467.30	165.10	46	Mun	Isabela
Balbalan	13,332	542.69	24.57	14	Mun	Kalinga
Lubuagan	8,660	234.20	36.98	9	Mun	Kalinga
Pasil	10,690	189.00	56.56	14	Mun	Kalinga
Pinukpuk	35,033	743.56	47.12	23	Mun	Kalinga
Rizal	20,491	231.00	88.71	14	Mun	Kalinga
Tabuk†	122,771	700.25	175.32	43	CC	Kalinga
Tanudan	11,103	307.55	36.10	16	Mun	Kalinga
Tinglayan	13,311	283.00	47.04	20	Mun	Kalinga
Agoo	65,256	52.84	1,234.97	49	Mun	La Union
Aringay	50,786	84.54	600.73	24	Mun	La Union
Bacnotan	45,203	76.60	590.12	47	Mun	La Union
Bagulin	14,434	107.33	134.48	10	Mun	La Union
Balaoan	40,440	68.70	588.65	36	Mun	La Union
Bangar	38,190	37.36	1,022.22	33	Mun	La Union
Bauang	77,670	73.15	1,061.79	39	Mun	La Union
Burgos	9,121	70.80	128.83	12	Mun	La Union
Caba	23,432	46.31	505.98	17	Mun	La Union
Luna	38,076	42.90	887.55	40	Mun	La Union
Naguilian	53,443	104.60	510.93	37	Mun	La Union
Pugo	19,107	62.84	304.06	14	Mun	La Union
Rosario	58,797	73.98	794.77	33	Mun	La Union
San Fernando†	124,809	102.72	1,215.04	59	CC	La Union
San Gabriel	18,579	129.87	143.06	15	Mun	La Union
San Juan	41,319	57.12	723.37	41	Mun	La Union
Santo Tomas	42,777	64.00	668.39	24	Mun	La Union
Santol	14,877	93.70	158.77	11	Mun	La Union
Sudipen	16,888	97.59	173.05	17	Mun	La Union
Tubao	31,868	50.75	627.94	18	Mun	La Union
Alaminos	53,589	57.46	932.63	15	Mun	Laguna
Bay	69,802	42.66	1,636.24	15	Mun	Laguna
Biñan†	584,479	43.50	13,436.30	24	CC	Laguna
Cabuyao	365,202	43.40	8,414.79	18	CC	Laguna
Calamba	575,046	149.50	3,846.46	54	CC	Laguna
Calauan	89,670	65.40	1,371.10	17	Mun	Laguna
Cavinti	24,740	203.58	121.52	19	Mun	Laguna
Famy	17,668	53.06	332.98	20	Mun	Laguna
Kalayaan	25,243	46.60	541.70	3	Mun	Laguna
Liliw	39,976	39.10	1,022.40	33	Mun	Laguna
Los Baños	117,030	54.22	2,158.43	14	Mun	Laguna
Luisiana	21,824	73.31	297.69	23	Mun	Laguna
Lumban	32,793	40.53	809.10	16	Mun	Laguna
Mabitac	21,748	80.76	269.29	15	Mun	Laguna
Magdalena	28,131	34.88	806.51	24	Mun	Laguna
Majayjay	28,504	69.58	409.66	40	Mun	Laguna
Nagcarlan	66,351	78.10	849.56	52	Mun	Laguna
Paete	25,254	55.02	459.00	9	Mun	Laguna
Pagsanjan	45,602	26.36	1,729.97	16	Mun	Laguna
Pakil	23,972	46.50	515.53	13	Mun	Laguna
Pangil	25,318	45.03	562.25	8	Mun	Laguna
Pila	57,776	31.20	1,851.79	17	Mun	Laguna
Rizal	18,864	27.90	676.13	11	Mun	Laguna
San Pablo	300,166	197.56	1,519.37	80	CC	Laguna
San Pedro	348,968	24.05	14,510.10	27	CC	Laguna
Santa Cruz	126,844	38.59	3,286.97	26	Mun	Laguna
Santa Maria	34,102	108.40	314.59	25	Mun	Laguna
Santa Rosa	430,920	54.84	7,857.77	18	CC	Laguna
Siniloan	42,533	64.51	659.32	20	Mun	Laguna
Victoria	45,230	22.35	2,023.71	9	Mun	Laguna
Bacolod	24,963	104.10	239.80	16	Mun	Lanao del Norte
Balo-i	74,003	90.98	813.40	21	Mun	Lanao del Norte
Baroy	24,763	72.35	342.27	23	Mun	Lanao del Norte
Iligan†	368,132	813.37	452.60	44	HUC	Lanao del Norte
Kapatagan	72,762	242.89	299.57	33	Mun	Lanao del Norte
Kauswagan	25,515	60.37	422.64	13	Mun	Lanao del Norte
Kolambugan	28,545	134.55	212.15	26	Mun	Lanao del Norte
Lala	75,015	140.25	534.87	27	Mun	Lanao del Norte
Linamon	21,385	76.38	279.98	8	Mun	Lanao del Norte
Magsaysay	20,581	151.83	135.55	24	Mun	Lanao del Norte
Maigo	23,400	121.45	192.67	13	Mun	Lanao del Norte
Matungao	16,404	45.74	358.64	12	Mun	Lanao del Norte
Munai	36,449	197.50	184.55	26	Mun	Lanao del Norte
Nunungan	19,036	473.28	40.22	25	Mun	Lanao del Norte
Pantao Ragat	32,557	124.30	261.92	20	Mun	Lanao del Norte
Pantar	27,300	70.40	387.78	21	Mun	Lanao del Norte
Poona Piagapo	30,666	260.07	117.91	26	Mun	Lanao del Norte
Salvador	34,053	113.99	298.74	25	Mun	Lanao del Norte
Sapad	24,826	140.03	177.29	17	Mun	Lanao del Norte
Sultan Naga Dimaporo	65,656	230.99	284.24	37	Mun	Lanao del Norte
Tagoloan	16,204	69.70	232.48	7	Mun	Lanao del Norte
Tangcal	17,247	178.62	96.56	18	Mun	Lanao del Norte
Tubod	50,395	246.80	204.19	24	Mun	Lanao del Norte
Amai Manabilang	14,837	544.10	27.27	17	Mun	Lanao del Sur
Bacolod-Kalawi	24,381	491.57	49.60	26	Mun	Lanao del Sur
Balabagan	31,227	230.00	135.77	27	Mun	Lanao del Sur
Balindong	40,047	453.94	88.22	38	Mun	Lanao del Sur
Bayang	30,227	230.00	131.42	49	Mun	Lanao del Sur
Binidayan	27,031	280.00	96.54	26	Mun	Lanao del Sur
Buadiposo-Buntong	23,283	215.00	108.29	33	Mun	Lanao del Sur
Bubong	28,733	798.50	35.98	36	Mun	Lanao del Sur
Butig	25,394	331.49	76.61	16	Mun	Lanao del Sur
Calanogas	17,585	195.00	90.18	17	Mun	Lanao del Sur
Ditsaan-Ramain	26,918	527.98	50.98	35	Mun	Lanao del Sur
Ganassi	33,897	256.00	132.41	32	Mun	Lanao del Sur
Kapai	21,630	398.50	54.28	20	Mun	Lanao del Sur
Kapatagan	23,228	288.13	80.62	15	Mun	Lanao del Sur
Lumba-Bayabao	50,959	640.02	79.62	38	Mun	Lanao del Sur
Lumbaca-Unayan	8,768	42.28	207.38	9	Mun	Lanao del Sur
Lumbatan	24,988	158.39	157.76	21	Mun	Lanao del Sur
Lumbayanague	21,469	302.18	71.05	22	Mun	Lanao del Sur
Madalum	30,044	498.39	60.28	37	Mun	Lanao del Sur
Madamba	24,886	225.00	110.60	24	Mun	Lanao del Sur
Maguing	37,292	815.04	45.75	34	Mun	Lanao del Sur
Malabang	58,377	198.10	294.68	37	Mun	Lanao del Sur
Marantao	46,233	660.00	70.05	34	Mun	Lanao del Sur
Marawi†	259,993	87.55	2,969.65	96	CC	Lanao del Sur
Marogong	33,595	365.00	92.04	24	Mun	Lanao del Sur
Masiu	36,803	170.00	216.49	35	Mun	Lanao del Sur
Mulondo	23,159	458.67	50.49	26	Mun	Lanao del Sur
Pagayawan	15,659	218.00	71.83	18	Mun	Lanao del Sur
Piagapo	40,558	340.07	119.26	37	Mun	Lanao del Sur
Picong	19,296	280.00	68.91	19	Mun	Lanao del Sur
Poona Bayabao	33,307	242.34	137.44	25	Mun	Lanao del Sur
Pualas	18,020	182.89	98.53	23	Mun	Lanao del Sur
Saguiaran	28,807	51.35	560.99	30	Mun	Lanao del Sur
Sultan Dumalondong	12,984	275.80	47.08	7	Mun	Lanao del Sur
Tagoloan II	12,843	362.35	35.44	19	Mun	Lanao del Sur
Tamparan	37,190	170.00	218.76	44	Mun	Lanao del Sur
Taraka	29,558	435.40	67.89	43	Mun	Lanao del Sur
Tubaran	17,567	435.00	40.38	21	Mun	Lanao del Sur
Tugaya	26,283	155.10	169.46	23	Mun	Lanao del Sur
Wao	51,081	485.24	105.27	26	Mun	Lanao del Sur
Abuyog	61,854	688.25	89.87	63	Mun	Leyte
Alangalang	59,063	150.54	392.34	54	Mun	Leyte
Albuera	47,333	303.35	156.03	16	Mun	Leyte
Babatngon	29,587	115.18	256.88	25	Mun	Leyte
Barugo	35,402	84.62	418.36	37	Mun	Leyte
Bato	39,275	72.45	542.10	32	Mun	Leyte
Baybay	114,708	459.30	249.75	92	CC	Leyte
Burauen	54,635	265.33	205.91	77	Mun	Leyte
Calubian	31,990	100.95	316.89	53	Mun	Leyte
Capoocan	34,388	185.40	185.48	21	Mun	Leyte
Carigara	56,060	117.86	475.65	49	Mun	Leyte
Dagami	36,700	161.65	227.03	65	Mun	Leyte
Dulag	50,728	110.70	458.25	45	Mun	Leyte
Hilongos	66,774	192.92	346.12	51	Mun	Leyte
Hindang	21,520	50.04	430.06	20	Mun	Leyte
Inopacan	21,629	94.62	228.59	20	Mun	Leyte
Isabel	46,858	64.01	732.04	24	Mun	Leyte
Jaro	44,643	207.19	215.47	46	Mun	Leyte
Javier	27,759	152.70	181.79	28	Mun	Leyte
Julita	16,053	53.30	301.18	26	Mun	Leyte
Kananga	60,885	144.20	422.23	23	Mun	Leyte
La Paz	19,797	72.70	272.31	35	Mun	Leyte
Leyte	40,622	181.26	224.11	30	Mun	Leyte
MacArthur	22,256	57.57	386.59	31	Mun	Leyte
Mahaplag	28,424	104.79	271.25	28	Mun	Leyte
Matag-ob	18,618	104.40	178.33	21	Mun	Leyte
Matalom	32,604	132.00	247.00	30	Mun	Leyte
Mayorga	18,713	42.17	443.75	16	Mun	Leyte
Merida	32,373	95.21	340.02	22	Mun	Leyte
Ormoc	238,545	613.60	388.76	110	ICC	Leyte
Palo	80,291	221.27	362.86	33	Mun	Leyte
Palompon	59,486	126.07	471.85	50	Mun	Leyte
Pastrana	20,327	86.35	235.40	29	Mun	Leyte
San Isidro	30,792	122.50	251.36	19	Mun	Leyte
San Miguel	20,322	145.11	140.05	21	Mun	Leyte
Santa Fe	22,889	53.97	424.11	20	Mun	Leyte
Tabango	33,888	96.62	350.73	13	Mun	Leyte
Tabontabon	12,157	24.18	502.77	16	Mun	Leyte
Tacloban†	259,353	201.72	1,285.71	138	HUC	Leyte
Tanauan	60,212	78.41	767.91	54	Mun	Leyte
Tolosa	22,016	22.54	976.75	15	Mun	Leyte
Tunga	8,301	7.70	1,078.05	8	Mun	Leyte
Villaba	42,981	150.31	285.95	35	Mun	Leyte
Barira	43,301	392.61	110.29	14	Mun	Maguindanao del Norte
Buldon	45,676	392.61	116.34	15	Mun	Maguindanao del Norte
Cotabato City†	383,383	176.00	2,178.31	37	ICC	Maguindanao del Norte
Datu Blah T. Sinsuat	32,088	147.21	217.97	13	Mun	Maguindanao del Norte
Datu Odin Sinsuat	152,907	461.80	331.11	34	Mun	Maguindanao del Norte
Kabuntalan	31,863	371.08	85.87	17	Mun	Maguindanao del Norte
Matanog	41,146	146.50	280.86	8	Mun	Maguindanao del Norte
Northern Kabuntalan	30,332	106.77	284.09	11	Mun	Maguindanao del Norte
Parang	123,209	850.78	144.82	25	Mun	Maguindanao del Norte
Sultan Kudarat	124,965	712.91	175.29	39	Mun	Maguindanao del Norte
Sultan Mastura	30,828	242.07	127.35	13	Mun	Maguindanao del Norte
Talitay	19,750	62.96	313.69	9	Mun	Maguindanao del Norte
Upi	65,363	742.95	87.98	23	Mun	Maguindanao del Norte
Ampatuan	31,560	255.40	123.57	11	Mun	Maguindanao del Sur
Buluan†	60,931	699.50	87.11	7	Mun	Maguindanao del Sur
Datu Abdullah Sangki	35,274	220.00	160.34	10	Mun	Maguindanao del Sur
Datu Anggal Midtimbang	35,243	85.43	412.54	7	Mun	Maguindanao del Sur
Datu Hoffer Ampatuan	27,678	461.10	60.03	11	Mun	Maguindanao del Sur
Datu Montawal	42,181	461.10	91.48	11	Mun	Maguindanao del Sur
Datu Paglas	38,446	132.10	291.04	23	Mun	Maguindanao del Sur
Datu Piang	31,063	302.97	102.53	16	Mun	Maguindanao del Sur
Datu Salibo	21,295	150.62	141.38	17	Mun	Maguindanao del Sur
Datu Saudi Ampatuan	33,374	60.16	554.75	8	Mun	Maguindanao del Sur
Datu Unsay	17,186	95.39	180.17	8	Mun	Maguindanao del Sur
General Salipada K. Pendatun	33,710	189.37	178.01	19	Mun	Maguindanao del Sur
Guindulungan	28,471	130.68	217.87	11	Mun	Maguindanao del Sur
Mamasapano	32,831	85.31	384.84	14	Mun	Maguindanao del Sur
Mangudadatu	28,511	98.16	290.45	14	Mun	Maguindanao del Sur
Pagalungan	49,326	898.76	54.88	12	Mun	Maguindanao del Sur
Paglat	21,317	177.74	119.93	8	Mun	Maguindanao del Sur
Pandag	29,244	85.31	342.80	8	Mun	Maguindanao del Sur
Rajah Buayan	31,329	71.98	435.25	11	Mun	Maguindanao del Sur
Shariff Aguak	37,437	392.70	95.33	13	Mun	Maguindanao del Sur
Shariff Saydona Mustapha	29,707	164.42	180.68	16	Mun	Maguindanao del Sur
South Upi	50,018	184.80	270.66	11	Mun	Maguindanao del Sur
Sultan sa Barongis	27,929	291.30	95.88	12	Mun	Maguindanao del Sur
Talayan	39,182	143.84	272.40	15	Mun	Maguindanao del Sur
Boac†	54,365	212.70	255.59	61	Mun	Marinduque
Buenavista	24,136	81.25	297.06	15	Mun	Marinduque
Gasan	35,315	100.88	350.07	25	Mun	Marinduque
Mogpog	32,577	108.06	301.47	37	Mun	Marinduque
Santa Cruz	51,594	270.77	190.55	55	Mun	Marinduque
Torrijos	28,535	178.92	159.48	25	Mun	Marinduque
Aroroy	89,154	440.30	202.48	41	Mun	Masbate
Baleno	28,787	204.38	140.85	24	Mun	Masbate
Balud	40,236	231.00	174.18	32	Mun	Masbate
Batuan	15,614	56.28	277.43	14	Mun	Masbate
Cataingan	51,165	191.64	266.98	36	Mun	Masbate
Cawayan	68,510	260.19	263.31	37	Mun	Masbate
Claveria	40,733	182.98	222.61	22	Mun	Masbate
Dimasalang	25,054	148.07	169.20	20	Mun	Masbate
Esperanza	18,021	67.49	267.02	20	Mun	Masbate
Mandaon	44,177	280.80	157.33	26	Mun	Masbate
Masbate City†	104,011	188.00	553.25	30	CC	Masbate
Milagros	57,362	565.30	101.47	27	Mun	Masbate
Mobo	41,199	143.47	287.16	29	Mun	Masbate
Monreal	25,843	128.67	200.85	11	Mun	Masbate
Palanas	28,133	171.10	164.42	24	Mun	Masbate
Pio V. Corpus	23,641	89.33	264.65	18	Mun	Masbate
Placer	56,658	193.03	293.52	35	Mun	Masbate
San Fernando	22,006	77.50	283.95	26	Mun	Masbate
San Jacinto	29,458	122.40	240.67	21	Mun	Masbate
San Pascual	44,641	246.65	180.99	22	Mun	Masbate
Uson	56,410	163.20	345.65	35	Mun	Masbate
Caloocan	1,712,945	55.80	30,697.94	188	HUC	Metro Manila
Las Piñas	615,549	32.69	18,829.89	20	HUC	Metro Manila
Makati	309,770	21.57	14,361.15	33	HUC	Metro Manila
Malabon	389,929	15.71	24,820.43	21	HUC	Metro Manila
Mandaluyong	465,902	11.26	41,376.73	27	HUC	Metro Manila
Manila	1,902,590	42.34	76,164.53	897	HUC	Metro Manila
Marikina	471,323	21.52	21,901.63	16	HUC	Metro Manila
Muntinlupa	552,225	39.75	13,892.45	9	HUC	Metro Manila
Navotas	252,878	8.94	28,286.13	18	HUC	Metro Manila
Parañaque	703,245	46.57	15,100.82	16	HUC	Metro Manila
Pasay	453,186	13.97	32,439.94	201	HUC	Metro Manila
Pasig	853,050	48.46	17,603.18	30	HUC	Metro Manila
Pateros	67,319	1.66	40,553.61	10	Mun	Metro Manila
Quezon City‡	3,084,270	171.71	17,962.09	142	HUC	Metro Manila
San Juan	134,312	5.95	22,573.45	21	HUC	Metro Manila
Taguig	1,308,085	45.21	28,933.53	28	HUC	Metro Manila
Valenzuela	725,173	47.02	15,422.65	33	HUC	Metro Manila
Aloran	28,095	118.06	237.97	38	Mun	Misamis Occidental
Baliangao	18,500	81.72	226.38	15	Mun	Misamis Occidental
Bonifacio	34,942	155.02	225.40	28	Mun	Misamis Occidental
Calamba	23,808	104.64	227.52	19	Mun	Misamis Occidental
Clarin	39,867	84.50	471.80	29	Mun	Misamis Occidental
Concepcion	6,608	61.60	107.27	18	Mun	Misamis Occidental
Don Victoriano	10,214	284.60	35.89	11	Mun	Misamis Occidental
Jimenez	29,265	81.43	359.39	24	Mun	Misamis Occidental
Lopez Jaena	25,806	94.70	272.50	28	Mun	Misamis Occidental
Oroquieta	71,373	237.88	300.04	47	CC	Misamis Occidental
Ozamiz†	143,620	169.95	845.07	51	CC	Misamis Occidental
Panaon	10,891	46.80	232.71	16	Mun	Misamis Occidental
Plaridel	40,321	80.00	504.01	33	Mun	Misamis Occidental
Sapang Dalaga	21,006	93.93	223.63	28	Mun	Misamis Occidental
Sinacaban	20,176	99.09	203.61	17	Mun	Misamis Occidental
Tangub	68,419	162.78	420.32	55	CC	Misamis Occidental
Tudela	29,082	98.52	295.19	33	Mun	Misamis Occidental
Alubijid	35,411	85.56	413.87	16	Mun	Misamis Oriental
Balingasag	76,877	147.11	522.58	30	Mun	Misamis Oriental
Balingoan	11,896	57.80	205.81	9	Mun	Misamis Oriental
Binuangan	8,293	30.43	272.53	8	Mun	Misamis Oriental
Cagayan de Oro†	741,617	412.80	1,796.55	80	HUC	Misamis Oriental
Claveria	52,718	579.63	90.95	24	Mun	Misamis Oriental
El Salvador	62,126	106.15	585.27	15	CC	Misamis Oriental
Gingoog	138,895	568.44	244.34	79	CC	Misamis Oriental
Gitagum	19,269	43.40	443.99	11	Mun	Misamis Oriental
Initao	34,445	111.27	309.56	16	Mun	Misamis Oriental
Jasaan	58,098	77.02	754.32	15	Mun	Misamis Oriental
Kinoguitan	15,763	42.56	370.37	15	Mun	Misamis Oriental
Lagonglong	25,072	83.78	299.26	10	Mun	Misamis Oriental
Laguindingan	27,688	44.23	626.00	11	Mun	Misamis Oriental
Libertad	13,461	22.47	599.07	9	Mun	Misamis Oriental
Lugait	20,946	27.45	763.06	8	Mun	Misamis Oriental
Magsaysay	37,084	143.14	259.08	13	Mun	Misamis Oriental
Manticao	30,968	123.01	251.75	25	Mun	Misamis Oriental
Medina	36,692	148.29	247.43	19	Mun	Misamis Oriental
Naawan	23,562	88.50	266.24	10	Mun	Misamis Oriental
Opol	66,836	175.13	381.64	14	Mun	Misamis Oriental
Salay	31,128	92.79	335.47	18	Mun	Misamis Oriental
Sugbongcogon	11,156	26.50	420.98	10	Mun	Misamis Oriental
Tagoloan	80,424	117.73	683.12	10	Mun	Misamis Oriental
Talisayan	26,801	140.33	190.99	18	Mun	Misamis Oriental
Villanueva	42,456	48.80	870.00	11	Mun	Misamis Oriental
Barlig	4,363	228.64	19.08	11	Mun	Mountain Province
Bauko†	31,470	153.00	205.69	22	Mun	Mountain Province
Besao	6,315	173.62	36.37	14	Mun	Mountain Province
Bontoc	23,466	396.10	59.24	16	Mun	Mountain Province
Natonin	8,906	252.00	35.34	11	Mun	Mountain Province
Paracelis	30,143	570.16	52.87	9	Mun	Mountain Province
Sabangan	8,556	72.04	118.77	15	Mun	Mountain Province
Sadanga	7,781	83.30	93.41	8	Mun	Mountain Province
Sagada	10,702	83.32	128.44	19	Mun	Mountain Province
Tadian	18,073	145.20	124.47	19	Mun	Mountain Province
Bacolod†	624,787	162.67	3,840.82	61	HUC	Negros Occidental
Bago	192,993	401.20	481.04	24	CC	Negros Occidental
Binalbagan	72,594	189.96	382.15	16	Mun	Negros Occidental
Cadiz	161,558	524.57	307.98	22	CC	Negros Occidental
Calatrava	83,813	504.50	166.13	40	Mun	Negros Occidental
Candoni	22,083	191.70	115.20	9	Mun	Negros Occidental
Cauayan	110,899	520.00	213.27	25	Mun	Negros Occidental
Don Salvador Benedicto	28,231	170.50	165.58	7	Mun	Negros Occidental
Enrique B. Magalona	65,730	113.25	580.40	23	Mun	Negros Occidental
Escalante	97,050	192.76	503.48	21	CC	Negros Occidental
Himamaylan	117,286	367.04	319.55	19	CC	Negros Occidental
Hinigaran	90,403	154.92	583.55	24	Mun	Negros Occidental
Hinoba-an	64,364	414.50	155.28	13	Mun	Negros Occidental
Ilog	63,444	281.70	225.22	15	Mun	Negros Occidental
Isabela	65,399	178.76	365.85	30	Mun	Negros Occidental
Kabankalan	210,893	697.35	302.42	32	CC	Negros Occidental
La Carlota	67,740	137.29	493.41	14	CC	Negros Occidental
La Castellana	82,500	185.22	445.42	13	Mun	Negros Occidental
Manapla	55,882	112.86	495.14	12	Mun	Negros Occidental
Moises Padilla	44,864	144.10	311.34	15	Mun	Negros Occidental
Murcia	90,123	279.14	322.86	23	Mun	Negros Occidental
Pontevedra	54,941	112.50	488.36	20	Mun	Negros Occidental
Pulupandan	31,942	23.00	1,388.78	20	Mun	Negros Occidental
Sagay	152,543	330.34	461.78	25	CC	Negros Occidental
San Carlos	133,175	451.50	294.96	18	CC	Negros Occidental
San Enrique	24,424	28.84	846.88	10	Mun	Negros Occidental
Silay	136,802	214.80	636.88	16	CC	Negros Occidental
Sipalay	73,847	379.78	194.45	17	CC	Negros Occidental
Talisay	109,204	201.18	542.82	27	CC	Negros Occidental
Toboso	44,973	117.33	383.30	9	Mun	Negros Occidental
Valladolid	40,487	48.03	842.95	16	Mun	Negros Occidental
Victorias	90,290	133.92	674.21	26	CC	Negros Occidental
Amlan	26,566	111.85	237.51	8	Mun	Negros Oriental
Ayungon	50,688	265.10	191.20	24	Mun	Negros Oriental
Bacong	43,889	40.30	1,089.06	22	Mun	Negros Oriental
Bais	88,050	319.64	275.47	35	CC	Negros Oriental
Basay	30,018	162.00	185.30	10	Mun	Negros Oriental
Bayawan	126,744	699.08	181.30	28	CC	Negros Oriental
Bindoy	41,543	173.70	239.17	22	Mun	Negros Oriental
Canlaon	62,785	170.93	367.31	12	CC	Negros Oriental
Dauin	30,921	114.10	271.00	23	Mun	Negros Oriental
Dumaguete†	142,171	33.62	4,228.76	30	CC	Negros Oriental
Guihulngan	106,576	388.56	274.28	33	CC	Negros Oriental
Jimalalud	32,996	139.50	236.53	28	Mun	Negros Oriental
La Libertad	42,721	139.60	306.02	29	Mun	Negros Oriental
Mabinay	85,770	319.44	268.50	32	Mun	Negros Oriental
Manjuyod	46,461	264.60	175.59	27	Mun	Negros Oriental
Pamplona	41,209	202.20	203.80	16	Mun	Negros Oriental
San Jose	22,870	54.46	419.94	14	Mun	Negros Oriental
Santa Catalina	80,382	523.10	153.66	22	Mun	Negros Oriental
Siaton	84,169	335.90	250.58	26	Mun	Negros Oriental
Sibulan	69,092	163.00	423.88	15	Mun	Negros Oriental
Tanjay	84,593	267.05	316.77	24	CC	Negros Oriental
Tayasan	39,005	154.20	252.95	28	Mun	Negros Oriental
Valencia	39,986	147.49	271.11	24	Mun	Negros Oriental
Vallehermoso	42,421	101.25	418.97	15	Mun	Negros Oriental
Zamboanguita	30,412	85.86	354.20	10	Mun	Negros Oriental
Allen	26,527	47.60	557.29	20	Mun	Northern Samar
Biri	11,005	24.62	446.99	8	Mun	Northern Samar
Bobon	27,266	130.00	209.74	18	Mun	Northern Samar
Capul	12,127	35.56	341.03	12	Mun	Northern Samar
Catarman†	97,738	464.43	210.45	55	Mun	Northern Samar
Catubig	32,688	214.99	152.04	47	Mun	Northern Samar
Gamay	21,546	115.10	187.19	26	Mun	Northern Samar
Laoang	60,980	246.94	246.94	56	Mun	Northern Samar
Lapinig	11,908	57.30	207.82	15	Mun	Northern Samar
Las Navas	37,425	282.61	132.43	53	Mun	Northern Samar
Lavezares	29,801	119.50	249.38	26	Mun	Northern Samar
Lope de Vega	15,779	280.00	56.35	22	Mun	Northern Samar
Mapanas	14,858	117.85	126.08	13	Mun	Northern Samar
Mondragon	43,116	288.90	149.24	24	Mun	Northern Samar
Palapag	34,954	179.60	194.62	32	Mun	Northern Samar
Pambujan	34,174	163.90	208.51	26	Mun	Northern Samar
Rosario	11,726	31.60	371.08	11	Mun	Northern Samar
San Antonio	8,904	27.00	329.78	10	Mun	Northern Samar
San Isidro	26,068	255.90	101.87	14	Mun	Northern Samar
San Jose	18,301	29.85	613.10	16	Mun	Northern Samar
San Roque	29,993	152.98	196.06	16	Mun	Northern Samar
San Vicente	7,308	15.80	462.53	7	Mun	Northern Samar
Silvino Lobos	15,512	224.20	69.19	26	Mun	Northern Samar
Victoria	16,085	186.70	86.15	16	Mun	Northern Samar
Aliaga	72,134	90.04	801.13	26	Mun	Nueva Ecija
Bongabon	69,376	286.95	241.77	28	Mun	Nueva Ecija
Cabanatuan†	343,672	192.29	1,787.26	89	CC	Nueva Ecija
Cabiao	89,497	111.83	800.30	23	Mun	Nueva Ecija
Carranglan	43,694	705.31	61.95	17	Mun	Nueva Ecija
Cuyapo	70,919	215.73	328.74	51	Mun	Nueva Ecija
Gabaldon	40,223	242.88	165.61	16	Mun	Nueva Ecija
Gapan	129,610	118.00	1,098.39	23	CC	Nueva Ecija
General Mamerto Natividad	43,779	533.08	82.12	20	Mun	Nueva Ecija
General Tinio	58,093	245.29	236.83	13	Mun	Nueva Ecija
Guimba	131,468	245.29	535.97	64	Mun	Nueva Ecija
Jaen	83,895	85.46	981.69	27	Mun	Nueva Ecija
Laur	40,185	295.88	135.82	17	Mun	Nueva Ecija
Licab	29,590	67.37	439.22	11	Mun	Nueva Ecija
Llanera	44,620	114.44	389.90	22	Mun	Nueva Ecija
Lupao	47,175	121.33	388.82	24	Mun	Nueva Ecija
Muñoz	85,061	163.05	521.69	37	CC	Nueva Ecija
Nampicuan	15,297	52.60	290.82	21	Mun	Nueva Ecija
Palayan	47,883	101.40	472.22	19	CC	Nueva Ecija
Pantabangan	32,694	392.56	83.28	14	Mun	Nueva Ecija
Peñaranda	33,043	95.00	347.82	10	Mun	Nueva Ecija
Quezon	42,621	68.53	621.93	16	Mun	Nueva Ecija
Rizal	71,749	120.55	595.18	26	Mun	Nueva Ecija
San Antonio	84,958	153.56	553.26	16	Mun	Nueva Ecija
San Isidro	55,108	56.49	975.54	9	Mun	Nueva Ecija
San Jose	156,714	185.99	842.59	38	CC	Nueva Ecija
San Leonardo	69,180	151.90	455.43	15	Mun	Nueva Ecija
Santa Rosa	80,258	147.15	545.42	33	Mun	Nueva Ecija
Santo Domingo	63,750	74.88	851.36	24	Mun	Nueva Ecija
Talavera	137,444	140.92	975.33	53	Mun	Nueva Ecija
Talugtug	26,469	93.95	281.73	28	Mun	Nueva Ecija
Zaragoza	55,657	72.02	772.80	19	Mun	Nueva Ecija
Alfonso Castañeda	8,933	375.40	23.80	6	Mun	Nueva Vizcaya
Ambaguio	16,401	156.26	104.96	8	Mun	Nueva Vizcaya
Aritao	45,000	265.60	169.43	22	Mun	Nueva Vizcaya
Bagabag	39,138	183.90	212.82	17	Mun	Nueva Vizcaya
Bambang	60,146	345.00	174.34	25	Mun	Nueva Vizcaya
Bayombong†	72,890	136.00	535.96	25	Mun	Nueva Vizcaya
Diadi	20,438	181.20	112.79	19	Mun	Nueva Vizcaya
Dupax del Norte	35,509	347.30	102.24	15	Mun	Nueva Vizcaya
Dupax del Sur	22,388	374.70	59.75	19	Mun	Nueva Vizcaya
Kasibu	46,845	318.80	146.94	30	Mun	Nueva Vizcaya
Kayapa	27,865	482.90	57.70	30	Mun	Nueva Vizcaya
Quezon	25,306	187.50	134.97	12	Mun	Nueva Vizcaya
Santa Fe	18,950	399.81	47.40	16	Mun	Nueva Vizcaya
Solano	69,296	139.80	495.68	22	Mun	Nueva Vizcaya
Villaverde	21,001	81.50	257.68	9	Mun	Nueva Vizcaya
Abra de Ilog	31,910	533.70	59.79	10	Mun	Occidental Mindoro
Calintaan	31,088	382.50	81.28	7	Mun	Occidental Mindoro
Looc	9,426	132.30	71.25	9	Mun	Occidental Mindoro
Lubang	18,761	113.10	165.88	16	Mun	Occidental Mindoro
Magsaysay	40,987	296.70	138.14	12	Mun	Occidental Mindoro
Mamburao	44,554	283.51	157.15	15	Mun	Occidental Mindoro
Paluan	19,461	564.50	34.47	12	Mun	Occidental Mindoro
Rizal	40,319	242.50	166.26	11	Mun	Occidental Mindoro
Sablayan	91,406	2,188.80	41.76	22	Mun	Occidental Mindoro
San Jose†	143,495	446.70	321.23	39	Mun	Occidental Mindoro
Santa Cruz	40,010	681.40	58.72	11	Mun	Occidental Mindoro
Baco	40,159	216.23	185.72	27	Mun	Oriental Mindoro
Bansud	44,396	343.47	129.26	13	Mun	Oriental Mindoro
Bongabong	77,540	498.20	155.64	36	Mun	Oriental Mindoro
Bulalacao	46,439	321.86	144.28	15	Mun	Oriental Mindoro
Calapan†	148,558	250.06	594.09	62	CC	Oriental Mindoro
Gloria	52,296	245.52	213.00	27	Mun	Oriental Mindoro
Mansalay	60,597	446.62	135.68	17	Mun	Oriental Mindoro
Naujan	109,122	503.10	216.90	70	Mun	Oriental Mindoro
Pinamalayan	90,420	282.26	320.34	37	Mun	Oriental Mindoro
Pola	35,771	159.34	224.49	23	Mun	Oriental Mindoro
Puerto Galera	42,301	247.85	170.67	13	Mun	Oriental Mindoro
Roxas	58,428	85.26	685.29	20	Mun	Oriental Mindoro
San Teodoro	19,650	341.00	57.62	8	Mun	Oriental Mindoro
Socorro	41,612	151.38	274.88	26	Mun	Oriental Mindoro
Victoria	52,215	146.23	357.07	32	Mun	Oriental Mindoro
Aborlan	39,972	807.33	49.51	19	Mun	Palawan
Agutaya	13,351	37.31	357.84	10	Mun	Palawan
Araceli	14,554	204.30	71.24	13	Mun	Palawan
Balabac	42,662	581.60	73.35	20	Mun	Palawan
Bataraza	87,384	726.20	120.33	22	Mun	Palawan
Brooke's Point	76,715	1,303.40	58.86	18	Mun	Palawan
Busuanga	26,974	392.90	68.65	14	Mun	Palawan
Cagayancillo	7,164	26.39	271.47	12	Mun	Palawan
Coron	69,439	689.10	100.77	23	Mun	Palawan
Culion	23,985	499.59	48.01	14	Mun	Palawan
Cuyo	24,702	84.95	290.78	17	Mun	Palawan
Dumaran	23,795	435.00	54.70	16	Mun	Palawan
El Nido	51,367	923.26	55.64	18	Mun	Palawan
Kalayaan	406	290.00	1.40	1	Mun	Palawan
Linapacan	16,782	195.44	85.87	10	Mun	Palawan
Magsaysay	13,273	49.48	268.25	11	Mun	Palawan
Narra	80,572	831.73	96.87	23	Mun	Palawan
Puerto Princesa†	316,384	2,381.02	132.88	66	HUC	Palawan
Quezon	68,532	943.19	72.66	14	Mun	Palawan
Rizal	59,040	1,256.47	46.99	11	Mun	Palawan
Roxas	69,729	1,177.56	59.21	31	Mun	Palawan
San Vicente	33,768	1,462.94	23.08	10	Mun	Palawan
Sofronio Española	39,371	473.91	83.08	9	Mun	Palawan
Taytay	85,258	1,257.68	67.79	31	Mun	Palawan
Angeles†	483,452	60.27	8,021.44	33	HUC	Pampanga
Apalit	121,057	61.47	1,969.37	12	Mun	Pampanga
Arayat	150,949	134.48	1,122.46	30	Mun	Pampanga
Bacolor	59,361	71.70	827.91	21	Mun	Pampanga
Candaba	124,019	176.40	703.06	33	Mun	Pampanga
Floridablanca	146,095	175.48	832.55	33	Mun	Pampanga
Guagua	137,948	48.67	2,834.35	31	Mun	Pampanga
Lubao	190,355	155.77	1,222.03	44	Mun	Pampanga
Mabalacat	306,594	83.18	3,685.91	27	CC	Pampanga
Macabebe	82,933	105.16	788.64	25	Mun	Pampanga
Magalang	133,883	97.32	1,375.70	27	Mun	Pampanga
Masantol	57,207	48.25	1,185.64	26	Mun	Pampanga
Mexico	187,597	117.41	1,597.79	43	Mun	Pampanga
Minalin	50,126	48.27	1,038.45	15	Mun	Pampanga
Porac	147,551	314.00	469.91	29	Mun	Pampanga
San Fernando	377,534	67.74	5,573.28	35	CC	Pampanga
San Luis	64,674	56.83	1,138.03	17	Mun	Pampanga
San Simon	65,760	57.37	1,146.24	14	Mun	Pampanga
Santa Ana	63,431	39.84	1,592.14	14	Mun	Pampanga
Santa Rita	42,915	29.76	1,442.04	10	Mun	Pampanga
Santo Tomas	44,376	21.30	2,083.38	7	Mun	Pampanga
Sasmuan	32,081	91.80	349.47	12	Mun	Pampanga
Agno	29,270	169.75	172.43	17	Mun	Pangasinan
Aguilar	45,363	195.07	232.55	16	Mun	Pangasinan
Alaminos	100,430	164.26	611.41	39	CC	Pangasinan
Alcala	49,479	45.71	1,082.45	16	Mun	Pangasinan
Anda	42,688	74.55	572.61	21	Mun	Pangasinan
Asingan	58,349	66.64	875.59	18	Mun	Pangasinan
Balungao	30,678	73.25	418.81	21	Mun	Pangasinan
Bani	52,715	179.65	293.43	27	Mun	Pangasinan
Basista	37,840	24.00	1,576.67	13	Mun	Pangasinan
Bautista	35,728	46.33	771.16	18	Mun	Pangasinan
Bayambang	129,506	143.94	899.72	77	Mun	Pangasinan
Binalonan	56,560	47.57	1,188.98	24	Mun	Pangasinan
Binmaley	88,006	118.50	742.67	33	Mun	Pangasinan
Bolinao	84,658	197.22	429.26	30	Mun	Pangasinan
Bugallon	76,027	189.64	400.90	24	Mun	Pangasinan
Burgos	23,240	131.32	176.97	14	Mun	Pangasinan
Calasiao	100,686	48.36	2,082.01	24	Mun	Pangasinan
Dagupan	174,777	37.23	4,694.52	31	ICC	Pangasinan
Dasol	31,842	166.60	191.13	18	Mun	Pangasinan
Infanta	26,837	254.29	105.54	13	Mun	Pangasinan
Labrador	26,995	90.99	296.68	10	Mun	Pangasinan
Laoac	34,550	40.50	853.09	22	Mun	Pangasinan
Lingayen	108,510	62.76	1,728.97	32	Mun	Pangasinan
Mabini	26,589	291.01	91.37	16	Mun	Pangasinan
Malasiqui	144,344	131.37	1,098.76	73	Mun	Pangasinan
Manaoag	76,606	55.95	1,369.19	26	Mun	Pangasinan
Mangaldan	113,302	48.47	2,337.57	30	Mun	Pangasinan
Mangatarem	79,648	317.50	250.86	82	Mun	Pangasinan
Mapandan	38,228	30.00	1,274.27	15	Mun	Pangasinan
Natividad	26,721	134.36	198.88	18	Mun	Pangasinan
Pozorrubio	75,143	134.60	558.27	34	Mun	Pangasinan
Rosales	67,510	66.39	1,016.87	37	Mun	Pangasinan
San Carlos†	208,330	169.03	1,232.50	86	CC	Pangasinan
San Fabian	87,714	81.28	1,079.16	34	Mun	Pangasinan
San Jacinto	44,713	44.18	1,012.06	19	Mun	Pangasinan
San Manuel	56,876	129.18	440.28	14	Mun	Pangasinan
San Nicolas	40,144	210.20	190.98	33	Mun	Pangasinan
San Quintin	34,322	115.90	296.13	21	Mun	Pangasinan
Santa Barbara	92,420	61.37	1,505.95	29	Mun	Pangasinan
Santa Maria	34,452	69.50	495.71	23	Mun	Pangasinan
Santo Tomas	14,894	12.99	1,146.57	10	Mun	Pangasinan
Sison	51,439	81.88	628.22	28	Mun	Pangasinan
Sual	38,625	130.16	296.75	19	Mun	Pangasinan
Tayug	45,476	51.24	887.51	21	Mun	Pangasinan
Umingan	78,940	258.43	305.46	58	Mun	Pangasinan
Urbiztondo	56,349	81.80	688.86	21	Mun	Pangasinan
Urdaneta	145,935	100.26	1,455.57	34	CC	Pangasinan
Villasis	65,086	75.83	858.31	21	Mun	Pangasinan
Agdangan	13,316	31.54	422.19	12	Mun	Quezon
Alabat	15,744	57.61	273.29	19	Mun	Quezon
Atimonan	65,552	239.66	273.52	42	Mun	Quezon
Buenavista	31,550	161.35	195.54	37	Mun	Quezon
Burdeos	22,742	199.82	113.81	13	Mun	Quezon
Calauag	68,999	324.71	212.49	81	Mun	Quezon
Candelaria	137,933	129.10	1,068.42	25	Mun	Quezon
Catanauan	76,250	253.07	301.30	46	Mun	Quezon
Dolores	32,645	62.60	521.49	16	Mun	Quezon
General Luna	25,110	101.02	248.56	27	Mun	Quezon
General Nakar	34,982	1,343.75	26.03	19	Mun	Quezon
Guinayangan	45,375	214.12	211.91	54	Mun	Quezon
Gumaca	72,454	189.65	382.04	59	Mun	Quezon
Infanta	77,676	342.76	226.62	36	Mun	Quezon
Jomalig	7,884	56.65	139.17	5	Mun	Quezon
Lopez	96,006	355.38	270.15	95	Mun	Quezon
Lucban	54,134	130.46	414.95	32	Mun	Quezon
Lucena†	280,331	80.21	3,494.96	33	HUC	Quezon
Macalelon	25,266	124.05	203.68	30	Mun	Quezon
Mauban	70,135	415.98	168.60	40	Mun	Quezon
Mulanay	53,976	420.00	128.51	28	Mun	Quezon
Padre Burgos	23,392	69.10	338.52	22	Mun	Quezon
Pagbilao	82,132	170.96	480.42	27	Mun	Quezon
Panukulan	17,118	226.61	75.54	13	Mun	Quezon
Patnanungan	15,554	139.20	111.74	6	Mun	Quezon
Perez	13,052	57.46	227.15	14	Mun	Quezon
Pitogo	22,499	73.39	306.57	39	Mun	Quezon
Plaridel	10,866	35.05	310.01	9	Mun	Quezon
Polillo	31,737	253.00	125.44	20	Mun	Quezon
Quezon	15,869	71.22	222.82	24	Mun	Quezon
Real	39,969	563.89	70.88	17	Mun	Quezon
Sampaloc	13,331	104.78	127.23	14	Mun	Quezon
San Andres	38,407	60.99	629.73	7	Mun	Quezon
San Antonio	36,451	172.93	210.78	20	Mun	Quezon
San Francisco	63,789	303.96	209.86	16	Mun	Quezon
San Narciso	53,375	263.58	202.50	24	Mun	Quezon
Sariaya	172,018	212.16	810.79	43	Mun	Quezon
Tagkawayan	54,709	534.35	102.38	45	Mun	Quezon
Tayabas	115,318	230.95	499.32	66	CC	Quezon
Tiaong	107,666	168.38	639.42	31	Mun	Quezon
Unisan	25,357	124.15	204.24	36	Mun	Quezon
Aglipay	31,596	161.70	195.40	25	Mun	Quirino
Cabarroguis	34,720	260.20	133.44	17	Mun	Quirino
Diffun†	58,254	320.10	181.99	33	Mun	Quirino
Maddela	41,867	918.57	45.58	32	Mun	Quirino
Nagtipunan	26,541	1,607.40	16.51	16	Mun	Quirino
Saguday	17,863	55.50	321.86	9	Mun	Quirino
Angono	134,975	26.22	5,147.79	10	Mun	Rizal
Antipolo†	913,712	306.10	2,985.01	16	CC	Rizal
Baras	91,099	84.93	1,072.64	10	Mun	Rizal
Binangonan	321,281	66.34	4,842.95	40	Mun	Rizal
Cainta	386,321	42.99	8,986.30	7	Mun	Rizal
Cardona	51,493	28.56	1,802.98	18	Mun	Rizal
Jalajala	34,901	44.12	791.05	11	Mun	Rizal
Morong	72,262	37.58	1,922.88	8	Mun	Rizal
Pililla	72,503	69.95	1,036.50	9	Mun	Rizal
Rodriguez	451,383	312.70	1,443.50	11	Mun	Rizal
San Mateo	276,449	55.09	5,018.13	15	Mun	Rizal
Tanay	145,597	200.00	727.99	20	Mun	Rizal
Taytay	397,111	38.80	10,234.82	5	Mun	Rizal
Teresa	67,454	18.61	3,624.61	9	Mun	Rizal
Alcantara	16,417	60.12	273.07	12	Mun	Romblon
Banton	5,848	32.48	180.05	17	Mun	Romblon
Cajidiocan	23,488	201.85	116.36	14	Mun	Romblon
Calatrava	11,254	86.70	129.80	7	Mun	Romblon
Concepcion	3,427	19.82	172.91	9	Mun	Romblon
Corcuera	9,021	28.53	316.19	15	Mun	Romblon
Ferrol	7,826	26.72	292.89	6	Mun	Romblon
Looc	21,964	132.82	165.37	12	Mun	Romblon
Magdiwang	15,170	100.75	150.57	9	Mun	Romblon
Odiongan†	48,133	185.67	259.24	25	Mun	Romblon
Romblon	39,004	86.87	448.99	31	Mun	Romblon
San Agustin	23,698	140.48	168.69	15	Mun	Romblon
San Andres	16,350	112.00	145.98	13	Mun	Romblon
San Fernando	23,660	196.87	120.18	12	Mun	Romblon
San Jose	11,626	22.05	527.26	5	Mun	Romblon
Santa Fe	17,578	63.52	276.73	11	Mun	Romblon
Santa Maria	8,360	36.20	230.94	6	Mun	Romblon
Almagro	8,571	51.36	166.88	23	Mun	Samar
Basey	57,645	513.01	112.37	51	Mun	Samar
Calbayog†	187,848	880.74	213.28	157	CC	Samar
Calbiga	23,309	283.70	82.16	41	Mun	Samar
Catbalogan	107,896	274.22	393.47	57	CC	Samar
Daram	41,932	140.26	298.96	58	Mun	Samar
Gandara	36,826	573.49	64.21	69	Mun	Samar
Hinabangan	13,791	460.08	29.98	21	Mun	Samar
Jiabong	19,482	67.70	287.77	34	Mun	Samar
Marabut	18,168	143.55	126.56	24	Mun	Samar
Matuguinao	7,708	172.51	44.68	20	Mun	Samar
Motiong	15,887	174.40	91.10	30	Mun	Samar
Pagsanghan	8,145	30.00	271.50	13	Mun	Samar
Paranas	35,281	556.12	63.44	44	Mun	Samar
Pinabacdao	18,639	183.06	101.82	24	Mun	Samar
San Jorge	17,863	241.20	74.06	41	Mun	Samar
San Jose de Buan	7,939	366.90	21.64	14	Mun	Samar
San Sebastian	9,110	39.07	233.17	14	Mun	Samar
Santa Margarita	27,012	129.12	209.20	36	Mun	Samar
Santa Rita	42,397	411.77	102.96	38	Mun	Samar
Santo Niño	13,088	29.53	443.21	13	Mun	Samar
Tagapul-an	9,139	28.70	318.43	14	Mun	Samar
Talalora	8,530	27.96	305.08	11	Mun	Samar
Tarangnan	26,013	132.49	196.34	41	Mun	Samar
Villareal	27,909	98.54	283.23	38	Mun	Samar
Zumarraga	16,051	38.55	416.37	25	Mun	Samar
Alabel	90,120	510.98	176.37	13	Mun	Sarangani
Glan†	117,017	610.30	191.74	31	Mun	Sarangani
Kiamba	68,745	328.68	209.15	19	Mun	Sarangani
Maasim	67,907	500.43	135.70	16	Mun	Sarangani
Maitum	46,120	290.66	158.67	19	Mun	Sarangani
Malapatan	82,577	609.28	135.53	12	Mun	Sarangani
Malungon	108,429	750.92	144.39	31	Mun	Sarangani
Enrique Villanueva	6,965	28.60	243.53	14	Mun	Siquijor
Larena	14,933	49.81	299.80	23	Mun	Siquijor
Lazi	23,092	70.64	326.90	18	Mun	Siquijor
Maria	15,146	53.37	283.79	22	Mun	Siquijor
San Juan	17,291	44.37	389.70	15	Mun	Siquijor
Siquijor†	30,215	90.70	333.13	42	Mun	Siquijor
Barcelona	21,911	61.18	358.14	25	Mun	Sorsogon
Bulan	106,919	196.96	542.85	63	Mun	Sorsogon
Bulusan	24,152	96.30	250.80	24	Mun	Sorsogon
Casiguran	36,464	87.13	418.50	25	Mun	Sorsogon
Castilla	61,308	186.20	329.26	34	Mun	Sorsogon
Donsol	51,781	156.20	331.50	51	Mun	Sorsogon
Gubat	61,095	134.51	454.20	42	Mun	Sorsogon
Irosin	59,540	149.87	397.28	28	Mun	Sorsogon
Juban	35,978	121.49	296.14	25	Mun	Sorsogon
Magallanes	38,072	150.09	253.66	34	Mun	Sorsogon
Matnog	42,444	162.40	261.35	40	Mun	Sorsogon
Pilar	76,908	248.00	310.11	49	Mun	Sorsogon
Prieto Diaz	23,424	49.07	477.36	23	Mun	Sorsogon
Santa Magdalena	17,400	43.50	400.00	14	Mun	Sorsogon
Sorsogon City†	187,670	276.11	679.69	64	CC	Sorsogon
Banga	91,536	240.35	380.84	22	Mun	South Cotabato
General Santos†	722,059	492.86	1,465.04	26	HUC	South Cotabato
Koronadal	201,844	277.00	728.68	27	CC	South Cotabato
Lake Sebu	84,252	702.00	120.02	19	Mun	South Cotabato
Norala	48,499	123.20	393.66	14	Mun	South Cotabato
Polomolok	176,671	339.97	519.67	23	Mun	South Cotabato
Santo Niño	41,026	86.20	475.94	10	Mun	South Cotabato
Surallah	91,412	540.30	169.19	17	Mun	South Cotabato
T'Boli	105,296	895.83	117.54	25	Mun	South Cotabato
Tampakan	42,304	390.00	108.47	14	Mun	South Cotabato
Tantangan	48,570	113.10	429.44	13	Mun	South Cotabato
Tupi	78,599	228.00	344.73	15	Mun	South Cotabato
Anahawan	8,766	58.09	150.90	14	Mun	Southern Leyte
Bontoc	32,082	102.10	314.22	40	Mun	Southern Leyte
Hinunangan	30,384	170.58	178.12	40	Mun	Southern Leyte
Hinundayan	13,042	59.90	217.73	17	Mun	Southern Leyte
Libagon	16,146	98.62	163.72	14	Mun	Southern Leyte
Liloan	23,787	50.30	472.90	24	Mun	Southern Leyte
Limasawa	6,480	6.98	928.37	6	Mun	Southern Leyte
Maasin†	85,486	211.71	403.79	70	CC	Southern Leyte
Macrohon	27,276	126.39	215.81	30	Mun	Southern Leyte
Malitbog	21,691	74.97	289.33	37	Mun	Southern Leyte
Padre Burgos	11,515	25.65	448.93	11	Mun	Southern Leyte
Pintuyan	10,930	36.98	295.57	23	Mun	Southern Leyte
Saint Bernard	28,131	100.20	280.75	30	Mun	Southern Leyte
San Francisco	12,897	68.60	188.00	22	Mun	Southern Leyte
San Juan	15,036	96.12	156.43	18	Mun	Southern Leyte
San Ricardo	10,385	47.56	218.36	15	Mun	Southern Leyte
Silago	14,677	215.05	68.25	15	Mun	Southern Leyte
Sogod	48,815	192.70	253.32	45	Mun	Southern Leyte
Tomas Oppus	16,846	56.11	300.23	29	Mun	Southern Leyte
Bagumbayan	69,830	672.06	103.90	19	Mun	Sultan Kudarat
Columbio	33,337	926.15	36.00	16	Mun	Sultan Kudarat
Esperanza	73,822	324.29	227.64	19	Mun	Sultan Kudarat
Isulan	101,455	541.25	187.45	17	Mun	Sultan Kudarat
Kalamansig	52,257	699.20	74.74	15	Mun	Sultan Kudarat
Lambayong	81,288	226.88	358.29	26	Mun	Sultan Kudarat
Lebak	93,312	470.86	198.17	27	Mun	Sultan Kudarat
Lutayan	65,425	271.00	241.42	11	Mun	Sultan Kudarat
Palimbang	83,633	484.85	172.49	40	Mun	Sultan Kudarat
President Quirino	44,344	208.40	212.78	19	Mun	Sultan Kudarat
Senator Ninoy Aquino	48,003	320.00	150.01	20	Mun	Sultan Kudarat
Tacurong†	116,945	153.40	762.35	20	CC	Sultan Kudarat
Banguingui	39,202	352.59	111.18	14	Mun	Sulu
Hadji Panglima Tahil	8,441	67.90	124.32	5	Mun	Sulu
Indanan	105,384	170.72	617.29	34	Mun	Sulu
Jolo†	152,067	126.40	1,203.06	8	Mun	Sulu
Kalingalan Caluang	42,845	166.50	257.33	9	Mun	Sulu
Lugus	35,412	133.04	266.18	17	Mun	Sulu
Luuk	44,741	313.04	142.92	12	Mun	Sulu
Maimbung	85,681	77.50	1,105.56	27	Mun	Sulu
Omar	30,847	180.98	170.44	8	Mun	Sulu
Panamao	53,903	107.57	501.10	31	Mun	Sulu
Pandami	35,369	170.89	206.97	16	Mun	Sulu
Panglima Estino	37,157	125.10	297.02	12	Mun	Sulu
Pangutaran	41,575	258.10	161.08	16	Mun	Sulu
Parang	83,092	258.00	322.06	40	Mun	Sulu
Pata	27,974	116.99	239.11	14	Mun	Sulu
Patikul	92,600	330.04	280.57	30	Mun	Sulu
Siasi	100,076	192.87	518.88	50	Mun	Sulu
Talipao	107,901	380.57	283.52	52	Mun	Sulu
Tapul	21,830	89.17	244.81	15	Mun	Sulu
Alegria	17,846	65.28	273.38	12	Mun	Surigao del Norte
Bacuag	17,076	95.85	178.15	9	Mun	Surigao del Norte
Burgos	4,399	19.27	228.28	6	Mun	Surigao del Norte
Claver	39,882	322.60	123.63	14	Mun	Surigao del Norte
Dapa	31,392	91.90	341.59	29	Mun	Surigao del Norte
Del Carmen	20,786	151.68	137.04	20	Mun	Surigao del Norte
General Luna	25,208	41.30	610.36	19	Mun	Surigao del Norte
Gigaquit	22,949	138.11	166.16	13	Mun	Surigao del Norte
Mainit	29,205	107.76	271.02	21	Mun	Surigao del Norte
Malimono	19,442	80.13	242.63	14	Mun	Surigao del Norte
Pilar	11,135	77.11	144.40	15	Mun	Surigao del Norte
Placer	30,442	61.29	496.69	20	Mun	Surigao del Norte
San Benito	5,880	45.63	128.86	6	Mun	Surigao del Norte
San Francisco	16,004	56.72	282.16	11	Mun	Surigao del Norte
San Isidro	8,813	42.03	209.68	12	Mun	Surigao del Norte
Santa Monica	9,757	39.19	248.97	11	Mun	Surigao del Norte
Sison	14,826	54.70	271.04	12	Mun	Surigao del Norte
Socorro	28,436	114.45	248.46	14	Mun	Surigao del Norte
Surigao City†	177,333	245.30	722.92	54	CC	Surigao del Norte
Tagana-an	18,158	77.29	234.93	14	Mun	Surigao del Norte
Tubod	16,675	45.34	367.78	9	Mun	Surigao del Norte
Barobo	53,729	242.50	221.56	21	Mun	Surigao del Sur
Bayabas	9,016	117.84	76.51	7	Mun	Surigao del Sur
Bislig†	99,872	331.80	301.00	24	CC	Surigao del Sur
Cagwait	22,305	214.10	104.18	11	Mun	Surigao del Sur
Cantilan	34,233	240.10	142.58	17	Mun	Surigao del Sur
Carmen	11,859	160.01	74.11	8	Mun	Surigao del Sur
Carrascal	25,672	265.80	96.58	14	Mun	Surigao del Sur
Cortes	18,023	127.08	141.82	12	Mun	Surigao del Sur
Hinatuan	44,475	299.10	148.70	24	Mun	Surigao del Sur
Lanuza	13,750	290.60	47.32	13	Mun	Surigao del Sur
Lianga	34,213	161.12	212.34	13	Mun	Surigao del Sur
Lingig	35,203	305.17	115.36	18	Mun	Surigao del Sur
Madrid	16,872	141.20	119.49	14	Mun	Surigao del Sur
Marihatag	19,730	312.50	63.14	12	Mun	Surigao del Sur
San Agustin	23,612	277.28	85.16	13	Mun	Surigao del Sur
San Miguel	41,942	558.00	75.16	18	Mun	Surigao del Sur
Tagbina	41,157	343.49	119.82	25	Mun	Surigao del Sur
Tago	40,097	253.28	158.31	24	Mun	Surigao del Sur
Tandag	63,098	291.73	216.29	21	CC	Surigao del Sur
Anao	12,865	23.87	538.96	18	Mun	Tarlac
Bamban	81,012	251.98	321.50	15	Mun	Tarlac
Camiling	91,400	140.53	650.39	61	Mun	Tarlac
Capas	162,724	376.39	432.33	20	Mun	Tarlac
Concepcion	178,549	242.99	734.80	45	Mun	Tarlac
Gerona	97,937	128.89	759.85	44	Mun	Tarlac
La Paz	71,978	114.33	629.56	21	Mun	Tarlac
Mayantoc	34,091	311.42	109.47	24	Mun	Tarlac
Moncada	66,925	85.75	780.47	37	Mun	Tarlac
Paniqui	106,190	105.16	1,009.79	35	Mun	Tarlac
Pura	27,017	31.01	871.24	16	Mun	Tarlac
Ramos	23,808	24.40	975.74	9	Mun	Tarlac
San Clemente	13,781	49.73	277.12	12	Mun	Tarlac
San Jose	43,185	592.81	72.85	13	Mun	Tarlac
San Manuel	29,693	42.10	705.30	15	Mun	Tarlac
Santa Ignacia	53,620	146.07	367.08	24	Mun	Tarlac
Tarlac City†	401,892	274.66	1,463.23	76	CC	Tarlac
Victoria	71,495	111.51	641.15	26	Mun	Tarlac
Bongao†	131,887	365.95	360.40	35	Mun	Tawi-Tawi
Languyan	41,587	581.20	71.55	20	Mun	Tawi-Tawi
Mapun	29,218	181.29	161.17	15	Mun	Tawi-Tawi
Panglima Sugala	52,657	416.66	126.38	17	Mun	Tawi-Tawi
Sapa-Sapa	37,129	235.61	157.59	23	Mun	Tawi-Tawi
Sibutu	38,070	285.32	133.43	16	Mun	Tawi-Tawi
Simunul	35,616	167.25	212.95	15	Mun	Tawi-Tawi
Sitangkai	42,172	792.00	53.25	9	Mun	Tawi-Tawi
South Ubian	31,942	272.04	117.42	31	Mun	Tawi-Tawi
Tandubas	34,702	552.05	62.86	20	Mun	Tawi-Tawi
Turtle Islands	7,665	62.50	122.64	2	Mun	Tawi-Tawi
Botolan	70,340	735.28	95.66	31	Mun	Zambales
Cabangan	29,334	175.29	167.35	22	Mun	Zambales
Candelaria	32,182	333.59	96.47	16	Mun	Zambales
Castillejos	70,105	92.99	753.90	14	Mun	Zambales
Iba	59,580	153.38	388.45	14	Mun	Zambales
Masinloc	56,579	331.50	170.68	13	Mun	Zambales
Olongapo†	264,903	185.00	1,431.91	17	HUC	Zambales
Palauig	43,250	310.00	139.52	19	Mun	Zambales
San Antonio	38,617	188.12	205.28	14	Mun	Zambales
San Felipe	26,081	111.60	233.70	11	Mun	Zambales
San Marcelino	39,542	416.86	94.86	18	Mun	Zambales
San Narciso	32,180	71.60	449.44	17	Mun	Zambales
Santa Cruz	66,647	438.46	152.00	25	Mun	Zambales
Subic	116,788	287.16	406.70	16	Mun	Zambales
Baliguian	25,585	439.26	58.25	17	Mun	Zamboanga del Norte
Dapitan	87,699	390.53	224.56	50	CC	Zamboanga del Norte
Dipolog†	136,528	241.13	566.20	21	CC	Zamboanga del Norte
Godod	18,040	190.00	94.95	17	Mun	Zamboanga del Norte
Gutalac	37,512	492.86	76.11	33	Mun	Zamboanga del Norte
Jose Dalman	27,951	135.00	207.04	18	Mun	Zamboanga del Norte
Kalawit	23,381	217.89	107.31	14	Mun	Zamboanga del Norte
Katipunan	43,427	244.12	177.89	30	Mun	Zamboanga del Norte
La Libertad	7,874	69.51	113.28	13	Mun	Zamboanga del Norte
Labason	44,615	169.58	263.09	20	Mun	Zamboanga del Norte
Leon B. Postigo	29,535	255.50	115.60	18	Mun	Zamboanga del Norte
Liloy	41,881	128.43	326.10	37	Mun	Zamboanga del Norte
Manukan	35,669	246.35	144.79	22	Mun	Zamboanga del Norte
Mutia	12,197	73.58	165.77	16	Mun	Zamboanga del Norte
Piñan	19,184	93.75	204.63	22	Mun	Zamboanga del Norte
Polanco	40,485	206.88	195.69	30	Mun	Zamboanga del Norte
Rizal	15,347	80.03	191.77	22	Mun	Zamboanga del Norte
Roxas	38,649	206.25	187.39	31	Mun	Zamboanga del Norte
Salug	33,060	206.60	160.02	23	Mun	Zamboanga del Norte
Sergio Osmeña	31,187	556.44	56.05	39	Mun	Zamboanga del Norte
Siayan	40,937	494.75	82.74	22	Mun	Zamboanga del Norte
Sibuco	37,883	782.54	48.41	28	Mun	Zamboanga del Norte
Sibutad	18,199	65.57	277.55	16	Mun	Zamboanga del Norte
Sindangan	104,514	451.00	231.74	52	Mun	Zamboanga del Norte
Siocon	51,239	503.20	101.83	26	Mun	Zamboanga del Norte
Sirawai	39,836	222.50	179.04	34	Mun	Zamboanga del Norte
Tampilisan	24,653	137.75	178.97	20	Mun	Zamboanga del Norte
Aurora	52,746	180.95	291.49	44	Mun	Zamboanga del Sur
Bayog	32,687	356.40	91.71	28	Mun	Zamboanga del Sur
Dimataling	33,156	141.80	233.82	24	Mun	Zamboanga del Sur
Dinas	35,409	121.10	292.39	30	Mun	Zamboanga del Sur
Dumalinao	34,188	117.64	290.62	30	Mun	Zamboanga del Sur
Dumingag	48,495	297.75	162.87	44	Mun	Zamboanga del Sur
Guipos	22,173	90.53	244.92	17	Mun	Zamboanga del Sur
Josefina	11,190	56.35	198.58	14	Mun	Zamboanga del Sur
Kumalarang	30,815	151.49	203.41	18	Mun	Zamboanga del Sur
Labangan	45,343	157.90	287.16	25	Mun	Zamboanga del Sur
Lakewood	23,599	201.30	117.23	14	Mun	Zamboanga del Sur
Lapuyan	28,686	329.00	87.19	26	Mun	Zamboanga del Sur
Mahayag	48,695	194.90	249.85	29	Mun	Zamboanga del Sur
Margosatubig	36,025	111.69	322.54	17	Mun	Zamboanga del Sur
Midsalip	35,643	161.56	220.62	33	Mun	Zamboanga del Sur
Molave	52,540	251.50	208.91	25	Mun	Zamboanga del Sur
Pagadian	206,483	378.80	545.10	54	CC	Zamboanga del Sur
Pitogo	28,375	95.94	295.76	15	Mun	Zamboanga del Sur
Ramon Magsaysay	28,419	113.70	249.95	27	Mun	Zamboanga del Sur
San Miguel	20,037	181.59	110.34	18	Mun	Zamboanga del Sur
San Pablo	26,166	149.90	174.56	28	Mun	Zamboanga del Sur
Sominot	17,247	111.52	154.65	18	Mun	Zamboanga del Sur
Tabina	24,591	86.90	282.98	15	Mun	Zamboanga del Sur
Tambulig	37,400	130.65	286.26	31	Mun	Zamboanga del Sur
Tigbao	19,716	120.69	163.36	18	Mun	Zamboanga del Sur
Tukuran	42,683	144.91	294.55	25	Mun	Zamboanga del Sur
Vincenzo A. Sagun	22,619	63.00	359.03	14	Mun	Zamboanga del Sur
Zamboanga City†	1,018,849	1,453.27	701.07	98	HUC	Zamboanga del Sur
Alicia	39,484	183.08	215.67	27	Mun	Zamboanga Sibugay
Buug	38,730	134.06	288.90	27	Mun	Zamboanga Sibugay
Diplahan	32,423	255.51	126.90	22	Mun	Zamboanga Sibugay
Imelda	29,652	255.51	116.05	18	Mun	Zamboanga Sibugay
Ipil†	96,363	241.60	398.85	28	Mun	Zamboanga Sibugay
Kabasalan	48,366	289.20	167.24	29	Mun	Zamboanga Sibugay
Mabuhay	24,296	82.85	293.25	18	Mun	Zamboanga Sibugay
Malangas	33,194	235.53	140.93	25	Mun	Zamboanga Sibugay
Naga	42,270	246.30	171.62	23	Mun	Zamboanga Sibugay
Olutanga	34,124	113.30	301.18	19	Mun	Zamboanga Sibugay
Payao	33,156	245.66	134.97	29	Mun	Zamboanga Sibugay
Roseller Lim	44,735	300.00	149.12	26	Mun	Zamboanga Sibugay
Siay	43,233	313.66	137.83	29	Mun	Zamboanga Sibugay
Talusan	17,925	58.16	308.20	14	Mun	Zamboanga Sibugay
Titay	55,534	350.44	158.47	30	Mun	Zamboanga Sibugay
Tungawan	48,013	473.28	101.45	25	Mun	Zamboanga Sibugay

== See also ==
- List of metropolitan areas in the Philippines

== See also ==
- List of renamed cities and municipalities in the Philippines
