= Maguindanao del Sur's 4th parliamentary district =

Parliamentary district for the Bangsamoro Parliament

- Constituency for the Bangsamoro Parliament
- Boundary of Maguindanao del Sur's 4th parliamentary district in Maguindanao del Sur
- Province: Maguindanao del Sur
- Population: 157,132 (2024)
- Electorate: 80,371 (2026)

Current constituency
- Member of Parliament: DJ Parok Mangudadatu (elect)
- Political party: BFP

Maguindanao del Sur's 4th parliamentary district is the fourth of the five parliamentary districts of the province of Maguindanao del Sur for the Bangsamoro Parliament. It is composed of the municipalities of Buluan, Datu Paglas, Mangudadatu, and Pandag.

DJ Parok Mangudadatu of the Bangsamoro Federalist Party is the member of Parliament-elect for the district following the inaugural 2026 Bangsamoro Parliament election. He will assume office on October 30, 2026.

== List of MPs representing the district ==
No.	Portrait	Member (Lifespan)	Term of office	Party	Parliament	Electoral history	Constituencies
1		DJ Parok Mangudadatu (born 1995)	Assuming office on October 30, 2026	BFP	1st Parliament	Elected in 2026.	2026–present Buluan, Datu Paglas, Mangudadatu, Pandag

== Election results ==
=== 2026 ===
2026 Bangsamoro Parliament election in Maguindanao del Sur
Party	Candidate	Votes	%
BFP	DJ Parok Mangudadatu	64,054	94.24
BaPa	Aladen Delna	3,914	5.76
Total votes		67,968	100.00
BFP win (new seat)			
