= Mangudadatu, Maguindanao del Sur =

Municipality in Maguindanao del Sur, Philippines

Mangudadatu
- Municipality
- Municipality of Mangudadatu
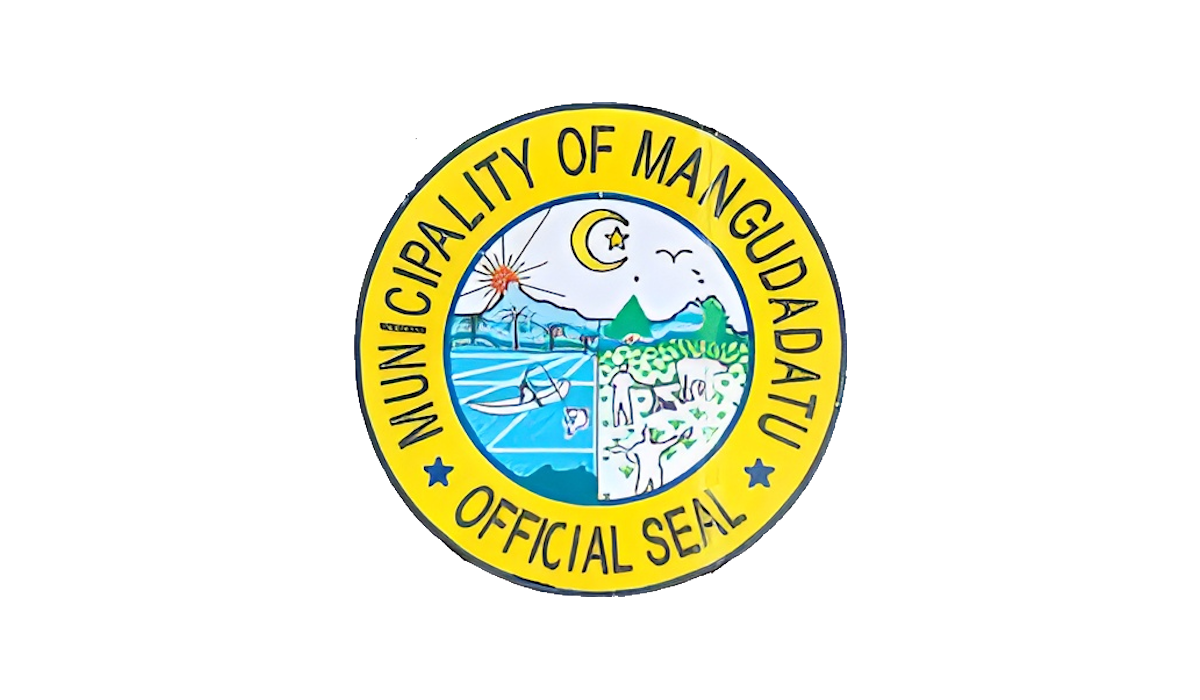
- Flag Seal

- Map of Maguindanao del Sur with Mangudadatu highlighted
- Interactive map of Mangudadatu
- Location within the Philippines
- Coordinates: 6°38′48″N 124°47′09″E
- Country: Philippines
- Region: Bangsamoro Autonomous Region in Muslim Mindanao
- Province: Maguindanao del Sur
- House district: Lone district
- Parliamentary district: 4th district
- Founded: December 30, 2006
- Barangays: 14 (see Barangays)

Government
  - Type: Sangguniang Bayan
  - Mayor: Freddie G. Mangudadatu
  - Vice Mayor: Elizabeth M. Tayuan
  - House Representative: Mohamad P. Paglas Sr.
  - Municipal Council: Members: Prince Mosafeer M. Dilangalen; Omar S. Gandalibo; Esmail A. Usop; Alamen L. Galuken; Maritess P. Sumapal; Alamen L. Galuken; Haron C. Rajahbuayan; Theb A. Mamasalanang
  - Electorate: 12,992 voters (2025)

Area
  - Total: 98.16 km^{2} (37.90 sq mi)
- Elevation: 15 m (49 ft)
- Highest elevation: 197 m (646 ft)
- Lowest elevation: 7 m (23 ft)

Population (2024 census)
  - Total: 28,511
  - Density: 290.5/km^{2} (752.3/sq mi)
  - Households: 4,135

Economy
  - Income class: 3rd municipal income class
  - Poverty incidence: 57.59% (2023)
  - Revenue: ₱ 138.5 million (2024)
  - Assets: ₱ 111.2 million (2024)
  - Expenditure: ₱ 138 million (2024)
  - Liabilities: ₱ 0.6584 million (2024)

Service provider
  - Electricity: Maguindanao Electric Cooperative (MAGELCO)
- Time zone: UTC+8 (PST)
- ZIP code: 9616
- PSGC: 1903832000
- IDD : area code: +63 (0)64
- Native languages: Maguindanao; Tagalog

Mangudadatu, officially the Municipality of Mangudadatu (Maguindanaon: Ingud nu Mangudadatu; Iranun: Inged a Mangudadatu; Tagalog: Bayan ng Mangudadatu), is a municipality in the province of Maguindanao del Sur, Philippines. According to the 2024 Census, it had a population of 28,511.

It was created out of 8 barangays of Buluan, by virtue of Muslim Mindanao Autonomy Act No. 204, which was subsequently ratified in a plebiscite held on December 30, 2006.

== Geography ==
=== Barangays ===
Mangudadatu is politically subdivided into 8 barangays. Each barangay consists of puroks while some have sitios.

- Daladagan
- Kalian
- Luayan
- Paitan
- Panapan
- Tenok
- Tinambulan
- Tumbao

=== Climate ===
Climate data for Mangudadatu, Maguindanao del Sur
Month	Jan	Feb	Mar	Apr	May	Jun	Jul	Aug	Sep	Oct	Nov	Dec	Year
Mean daily maximum °C (°F)	31 (88)	31 (88)	32 (90)	32 (90)	31 (88)	30 (86)	30 (86)	30 (86)	30 (86)	30 (86)	30 (86)	31 (88)	31 (87)
Mean daily minimum °C (°F)	23 (73)	23 (73)	23 (73)	24 (75)	24 (75)	24 (75)	24 (75)	24 (75)	24 (75)	24 (75)	24 (75)	24 (75)	24 (75)
Average precipitation mm (inches)	64 (2.5)	45 (1.8)	59 (2.3)	71 (2.8)	140 (5.5)	179 (7.0)	192 (7.6)	198 (7.8)	163 (6.4)	147 (5.8)	113 (4.4)	66 (2.6)	1,437 (56.5)
Average rainy days	12.2	10.3	12.7	15.7	26.0	27.4	28.1	28.2	26.0	26.7	22.9	16.6	252.8
Source: Meteoblue (modeled/calculated data, not measured locally)

== Demographics ==
Population census of Mangudadatu
Year	Pop.	±% p.a.
2007	24,300	—
2010	14,864	−16.38%
2015	25,046	+10.45%
2020	26,203	+0.96%
2024	28,511	+2.05%
Source: Philippine Statistics Authority

== Economy ==
Poverty incidence of Mangudadatu (%)

Source: Philippine Statistics Authority
