= Pandag =

Municipality in Maguindanao del Sur, Philippines

- Municipality
- Municipality of Pandag
- Municipal Compound and Hall

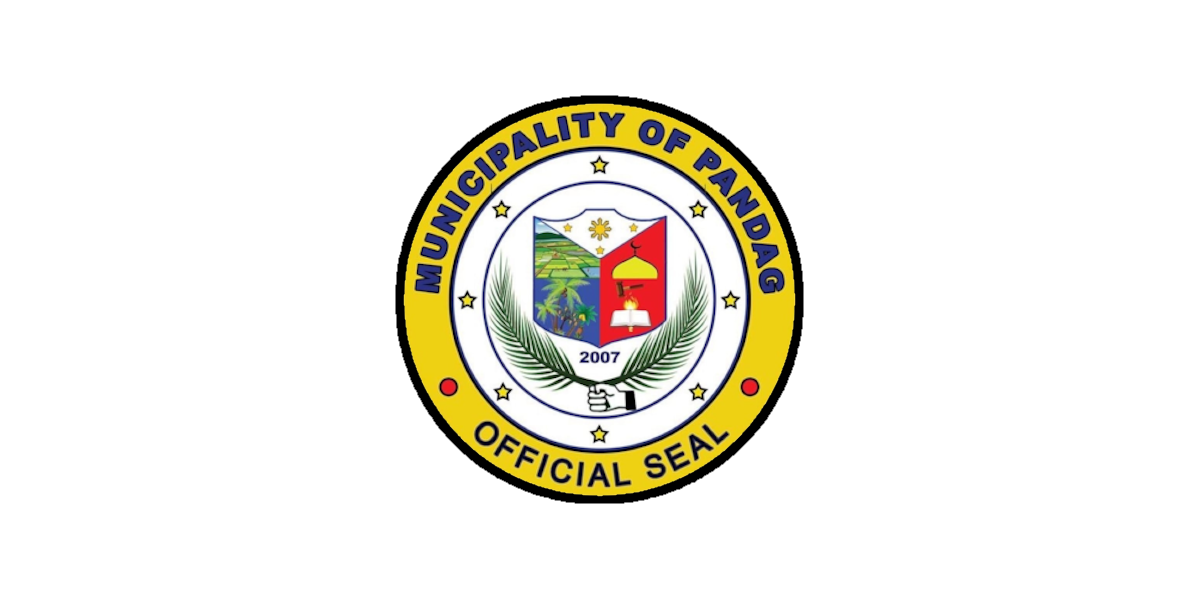
- Flag Seal

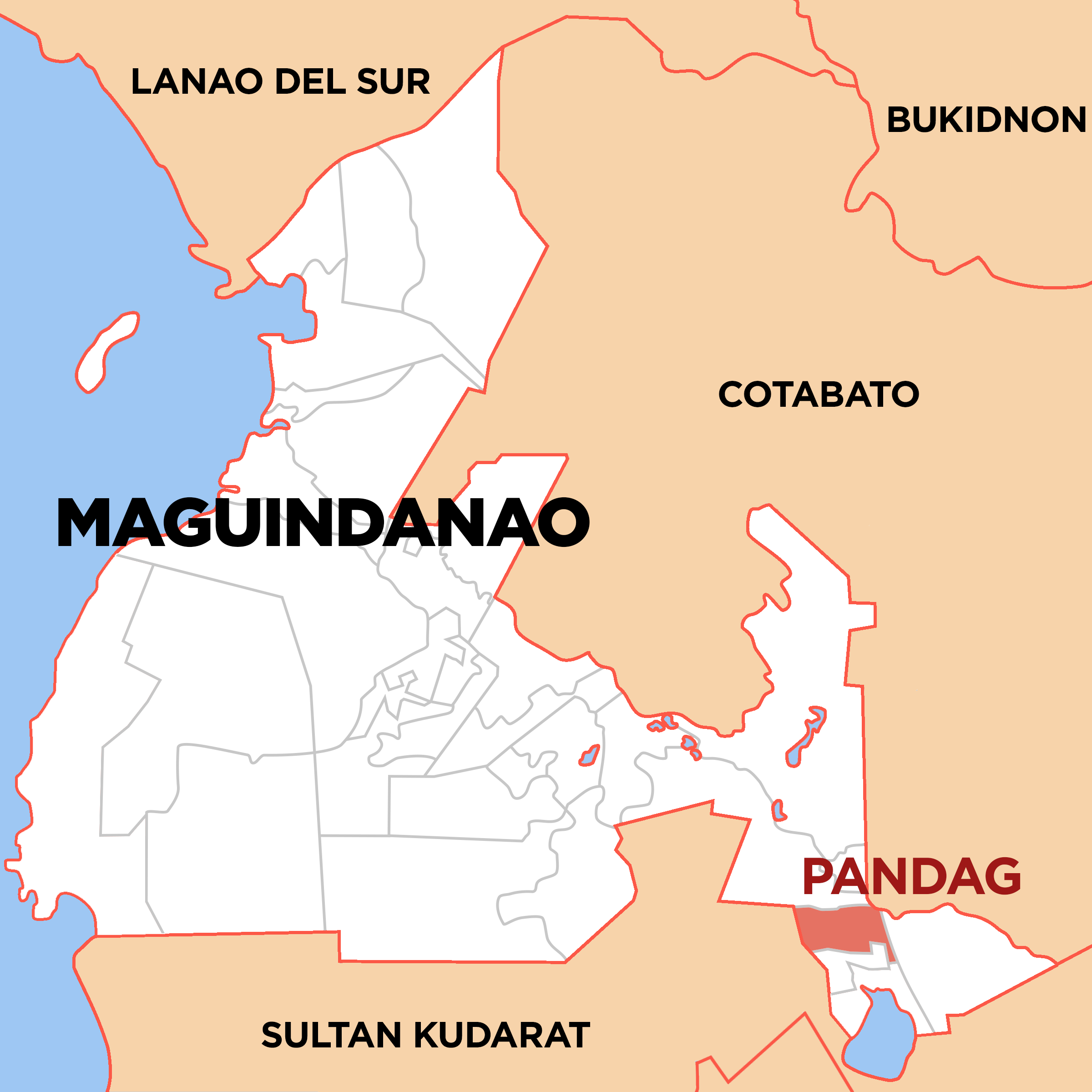
- Map of Maguindanao del Sur with Pandag highlighted
- Interactive map of Pandag
- Location within the Philippines
- Coordinates: 6°44′28″N 124°46′58″E
- Country: Philippines
- Region: Bangsamoro Autonomous Region in Muslim Mindanao
- Province: Maguindanao del Sur
- House district: Lone district
- Parliamentary district: 4th district
- Founded: December 30, 2006
- Barangays: 8 (see Barangays)

Government
  - Type: Sangguniang Bayan
  - Mayor: Mohajeran "Odjie" Balayman
  - Vice Mayor: Sanny S. Macalintangui
  - House Representative: Mohamad P. Paglas Sr.
  - Municipal Council: Members: Dondon Abdulatip; Meng Kabugatan; Abedin Kando; Marigen Mangudadatu; Abusama Ansid; Anwar Kalipapa; Laga Mamalinta; Norsia Hasim
  - Electorate: 16,226 voters (2025)

Area
  - Total: 85.31 km^{2} (32.94 sq mi)
- Elevation: 18 m (59 ft)
- Highest elevation: 38 m (125 ft)
- Lowest elevation: 7 m (23 ft)

Population (2024 census)
  - Total: 31,329
  - Density: 367.2/km^{2} (951.1/sq mi)
  - Households: 4,146

Economy
  - Income class: 4th municipal income class
  - Poverty incidence: 55.5% (2023)
  - Revenue: ₱ 121.8 million (2024)
  - Assets: ₱ 248.7 million (2024)
  - Expenditure: ₱ 134.6 million (2024)
  - Liabilities: ₱ 48.79 million (2024)

Service provider
  - Electricity: Maguindanao Electric Cooperative (MAGELCO)
- Time zone: UTC+8 (PST)
- ZIP code: 9616
- PSGC: 1903833000
- IDD : area code: +63 (0)64
- Native languages: Maguindanao; Tagalog

Pandag, officially the Municipality of Pandag (Maguindanaon: Ingud nu Pandag; Iranun: Inged a Pandag; Tagalog: Bayan ng Pandag), is a municipality in the province of Maguindanao del Sur, Philippines. According to the 2024 census, it had a population of 31,329.

It was created out of 8 barangays of Buluan, by virtue of Muslim Mindanao Autonomy Act No. 203, which was subsequently ratified in a plebiscite held on December 30, 2006.

== Geography ==
=== Barangays ===
Pandag is politically subdivided into 8 barangays. Each barangay consists of puroks while some have sitios.

- Kabuling
- Kayaga
- Kayupo (Cuyapo)
- Lepak
- Lower Dilag
- Malangit
- Pandag
- Upper D’lag

=== Climate ===
Climate data for Pandag, Maguindanao del Sur
Month	Jan	Feb	Mar	Apr	May	Jun	Jul	Aug	Sep	Oct	Nov	Dec	Year
Mean daily maximum °C (°F)	31 (88)	31 (88)	32 (90)	32 (90)	31 (88)	30 (86)	30 (86)	30 (86)	30 (86)	30 (86)	30 (86)	31 (88)	31 (87)
Mean daily minimum °C (°F)	23 (73)	23 (73)	23 (73)	24 (75)	24 (75)	24 (75)	24 (75)	24 (75)	24 (75)	24 (75)	24 (75)	24 (75)	24 (75)
Average precipitation mm (inches)	64 (2.5)	45 (1.8)	59 (2.3)	71 (2.8)	140 (5.5)	179 (7.0)	192 (7.6)	198 (7.8)	163 (6.4)	147 (5.8)	113 (4.4)	66 (2.6)	1,437 (56.5)
Average rainy days	12.2	10.3	12.7	15.7	26.0	27.4	28.1	28.2	26.0	26.7	22.9	16.6	252.8
Source: Meteoblue (modeled/calculated data, not measured locally)

== Demographics ==
Population census of Pandag
Year	Pop.	±% p.a.
2007	20,557	—
2010	13,795	−13.51%
2015	25,057	+12.04%
2020	26,356	+1.07%
2024	31,329	+4.24%
Source: Philippine Statistics Authority

== Economy ==
Poverty Incidence of Pandag

Source: Philippine Statistics Authority
