= List of current Philippine governors =

Parties of current Philippine provincial governors shaded for their respective provinces

The Philippines has 82 provinces. Each province has a governor who serves as the chief executive of its government. The governor is elected by the voters of the province for a three-year term and may serve a maximum of three consecutive terms. To run for governor, a candidate must be a Philippine citizen, a registered voter in the province, a resident of the province for at least one year before the election, able to read or write Filipino or any other local language or dialect, and at least 23 years old on election day.

The current gubernatorial term runs from June 30, 2025, to June 30, 2028.

== List ==
Province	Portrait	Governor	Party	Term	Born	Prior experience	Assumed office
Abra (list)		Takit Bersamin	PFP	1	March 13, 1947 (age 79)	Businessman Governor of Abra	June 30, 2025
Agusan del Norte (list)		Angelica Amante	PDP–Laban	2	April 16, 1970 (age 56)	Nurse Governor of Agusan del Norte House of Representatives	June 30, 2022
Agusan del Sur (list)		Santiago Cane Jr.	NUP	3	February 2, 1958 (age 68)	Vice Governor of Agusan del Sur	June 30, 2019
Aklan (list)		Jose Enrique Miraflores	Lakas	2	June 22, 1982 (age 44)	Mayor of Ibajay	June 30, 2022
Albay (list)		Noel Rosal	NUP	1	January 2, 1964 (age 62)	Engineer Governor of Albay Mayor of Legazpi City Administrator of Legazpi	June 30, 2025
Antique (list)		Paolo Javier	Aksyon	1	January 17, 1981 (age 45)	Businessman House of Representatives	June 30, 2025
Apayao (list)		Elias Bulut Jr.	NPC	2	May 15, 1970 (age 56)	House of Representatives Governor of Apayao Mayor of Calanasan	June 30, 2022
Aurora (list)		Isidro Galban	LDP	0	May 15, 1961 (age 65)	Civil engineer, professor, entrepreneur Vice Governor of Aurora Aurora Provincial Board	September 22, 2025 (Note: Isidro Galban assumed office on September 22, 2025, after Reynante Tolentino died.)
Basilan (list)		Mujiv Hataman	BUP	1	September 11, 1972 (age 54)	Indigenous people's rights advocate House of Representatives Governor of the Autonomous Region in Muslim Mindanao	June 30, 2025
Bataan (list)		Joet Garcia	PFP	2	November 12, 1971 (age 54)	House of Representatives Mayor of Balanga	June 30, 2022
Batanes (list)		Jun Aguto	PFP	1	October 19, 1972 (age 54)	National Bureau of Investigation Cybercrime Division chief	June 30, 2025
Batangas (list)		Vilma Santos	Nacionalista	1	November 3, 1953 (age 72)	Actress House of Representatives Governor of Batangas Mayor of Lipa	June 30, 2025
Benguet (list)		Melchor Diclas	Lakas	3	March 18, 1973 (age 53)	Physician Mayor of Buguias Vice Mayor of Buguias	June 30, 2019
Biliran (list)		Rogelio Espina	Nacionalista	1	June 30, 1960 (age 66)	Businessman Governor of Biliran House of Representatives	June 30, 2025
Bohol (list)		Aris Aumentado	PFP	2	December 29, 1977 (age 48)	Businessman House of Representatives	June 30, 2022 (Note: Aris Aumentado was suspended from May 28 to July 31, 2024.)
Bukidnon (list)		Rogelio Neil Roque	PFP	2	July 15, 1969 (age 57)	Businessman House of Representatives Valencia City Council	June 30, 2022
Bulacan (list)		Daniel Fernando	NUP	3	May 12, 1962 (age 64)	Actor Vice Governor of Bulacan Bulacan Provincial Board	June 30, 2019
Cagayan (list)		Edgar Aglipay	Nacionalista	1	September 13, 1948 (age 78)	Businessman Philippine Retirement Authority Chairman Chief of the Philippine National Police	June 30, 2025
Camarines Norte (list)		Ricarte Padilla	PFP	0	June 1, 1965 (age 61)	Mayor of Jose Panganiban	June 30, 2022 (Note: Ricarte Padilla was suspended from June 30, 2025 until February 24, 2026.)
Camarines Sur (list)		Luis Raymund Villafuerte	NUP	1	June 3, 1968 (age 58)	Businessman House of Representatives Governor of Camarines Sur	June 30, 2025
Camiguin (list)		Xavier Jesus Romualdo	Lakas	2	December 5, 1986 (age 39)	Lawyer House of Representatives	June 30, 2022
Capiz (list)		Fredenil Castro	Lakas (One Capiz)	2	April 27, 1951 (age 75)	Farmer, businessman House of Representatives	June 30, 2022
Catanduanes (list)		Patrick Azanza	NUP	1	December 18, 1968 (age 57)	Educator Catanduanes State University President	June 30, 2025
Cavite (list)		Abeng Remulla	NUP	1	May 25, 1993 (age 33)	Cavite Provincial Board	June 30, 2025
Cebu (list)		Pamela Baricuatro	PDP–Laban	1	November 9, 1966 (age 59)	Philanthropist LBP Resources and Development Corporation national board director	June 30, 2025
Cotabato (list)		Emmylou Mendoza	Nacionalista	2	February 25, 1972 (age 54)	Vice Governor of Cotabato Governor of Cotabato House of Representatives	June 30, 2022
Davao de Oro (list)		Raul Mabanglo	Lakas	1	September 14, 1961 (age 65)	Engineer Davao del Norte Association of Barangay Captains President	June 30, 2025
Davao del Norte (list)		Edwin Jubahib	PFP	3	April 27, 1974 (age 52)	Businessman	June 30, 2019 (Note: Edwin Jubahib was suspended from April 8 to July 8, 2024.)
Davao del Sur (list)		Yvonne Roña Cagas	Nacionalista	2	March 13, 1990 (age 36)		June 30, 2022
Davao Occidental (list)		Franklin Bautista	PFP	2	April 1, 1952 (age 74)	Lawyer Vice Governor of Davao Occidental House of Representatives Mayor of Malita	June 30, 2022
Davao Oriental (list)		Nelson Dayanghirang	PFP	1	January 24, 1966 (age 60)	House of Representatives Governor of Davao Oriental	June 30, 2025
Dinagat Islands (list)		Nilo Demerey Jr.	PFP	2	October 23, 1968 (age 58)	Vice Governor of Dinagat Islands Dinagat Islands Provincial Board	June 30, 2022
Eastern Samar (list)		RV Evardone	PFP	1	February 14, 2000 (age 26)	Economist Eastern Samar Philippine Councilors League President Sulat Municipal Council	June 30, 2025
Guimaras (list)		Lucille Nava	NUP	1	September 21, 1966 (age 60)	Physician House of Representatives	June 30, 2025
Ifugao (list)		Jerry Dalipog	Lakas	3	February 20, 1964 (age 62)	Civil engineer Mayor of Banaue	June 30, 2019
Ilocos Norte (list)		Cecilia Marcos	Nacionalista	1	January 5, 1956 (age 70)	Vice Governor of Ilocos Norte	June 30, 2025
Ilocos Sur (list)		Jerry Singson	NPC (Bileg)	2	September 15, 1948 (age 78)	Businessman Vice Governor of Ilocos Sur Ilocos Sur Provincial Board Vice Mayor of Vigan	June 30, 2022
Iloilo (list)		Arthur Defensor Jr.	PFP (Uswag Ilonggo)	3	October 8, 1969 (age 57)	Lawyer House of Representatives Iloilo Provincial Board	June 30, 2019
Isabela (list)		Rodolfo Albano III	PFP	3	March 2, 1959 (age 67)	House of Representatives Vice Governor of Isabela	June 30, 2019
Kalinga (list)		James Edduba	Lakas	2	February 20, 1965 (age 61)	Vice Governor of Kalinga Mayor of Pasil	June 30, 2022
La Union (list)		Mario Eduardo Ortega	PFP	1	February 3, 1956 (age 70)	Vice Governor of La Union	June 30, 2025
Laguna (list)		Sol Aragones	Akay	1	November 7, 1977 (age 48)	Journalist, businesswoman House of Representatives	June 30, 2025
Lanao del Norte (list)		Mohamad Khalid Dimaporo	Lakas	1	February 16, 1980 (age 46)	Economist House of Representatives Governor of Lanao del Norte	June 30, 2025
Lanao del Sur (list)		Mamintal Adiong Jr.	Lakas	3	March 17, 1965 (age 61)	Civil engineer Vice Governor of Lanao del Sur Governor of Lanao del Sur Provincial Administrator of Lanao del Sur Lanao del Sur Provincial Board	June 30, 2019
Leyte (list)		Jericho Petilla	NPC	2	April 29, 1963 (age 63)	Secretary of Energy Governor of Leyte	June 30, 2022
Maguindanao del Norte (list)		Tucao Mastura	PFP	1	September 3, 1946 (age 80)	Mayor of Sultan Kudarat Member of the Bangsamoro Transition Authority Parliament Governor of Shariff Kabunsuan	June 30, 2025
Maguindanao del Sur (list)		Ali Midtimbang	PFP	1	November 10, 1949 (age 76)	Farmer Mayor of Talayan	June 30, 2025
Marinduque (list)		Mel Go	PDP–Laban	1	May 23, 1954 (age 72)	Businessman Marinduque Provincial Board	June 30, 2025
Masbate (list)		Richard Kho	Lakas	1	December 31, 1996 (age 29)	Lawyer House of Representatives	June 30, 2025
Misamis Occidental (list)		Henry Oaminal	Nacionalista	2	October 11, 1958 (age 68)	Businessman House of Representatives Vice Governor of Misamis Occidental Misamis Occidental Provincial Board	June 30, 2022
Misamis Oriental (list)		Juliette Uy	NUP	1	June 20, 1962 (age 64)	House of Representatives	June 30, 2025
Mountain Province (list)		Bonifacio Lacwasan	PFP	3	September 15, 1958 (age 68)	Vice Governor of Mountain Province	March 31, 2016 (Note: Bonifacio Lacwasan assumed office on April 5, 2016, after Leonard Mayaen died. Lacwasan was elected as vice governor in the 2016 local elections, but continued to serve as governor after the only candidate in the gubernatorial election, Mayaen, died.)
Negros Occidental (list)		Bong Lacson	NPC	3	December 13, 1959 (age 66)	Sugar planter Vice Governor of Negros Occidental Mayor of San Carlos	June 30, 2019
Negros Oriental (list)		Chaco Sagarbarria	PFP	1	May 18, 1987 (age 39)	Vice Governor of Negros Oriental Negros Oriental Provincial Board Dumaguete City Council	May 31, 2023 (Note: Chaco Sagarbarria assumed office on May 31, 2023, after Guido Reyes died.)
Northern Samar (list)		Harris Ongchuan	NUP	1	March 29, 1973 (age 53)	House of Representatives	June 30, 2025
Nueva Ecija (list)		Aurelio Umali	Lakas (Unang Sigaw)	3	January 25, 1966 (age 60)	Lawyer Governor of Nueva Ecija House of Representatives National Telecommunications Commission Deputy Commissioner	June 30, 2019
Nueva Vizcaya (list)		Jose Gambito	PFP	1	July 10, 1953 (age 73)	Lawyer Vice Governor of Nueva Vizcaya	May 5, 2023 (Note: Jose Gambito assumed office on May 5, 2023, after Carlos Padilla died.)
Occidental Mindoro (list)		Eduardo Gadiano	PFP	3	April 1, 1963 (age 63)	Mayor of Sablayan Vice Mayor of Sablayan	June 30, 2019
Oriental Mindoro (list)		Humerlito Dolor	PDP–Laban (GSM)	3	November 27, 1976 (age 49)	Vice Governor of Oriental Mindoro Oriental Mindoro Provincial Board	June 30, 2019
Palawan (list)		Amy Alvarez	PPPL	1	May 22, 1977 (age 49)	Mayor of San Vicente	June 30, 2025
Pangasinan (list)		Ramon Guico III	Nacionalista	2	March 19, 1975 (age 51)	Pilot House of Representatives Mayor of Binalonan Vice Mayor of Binalonan	June 30, 2022
Pampanga (list)		Lilia Pineda	NPC (Kambilan)	1	February 20, 1951 (age 75)	Businesswoman Vice Governor of Pampanga Governor of Pampanga Pampanga Provincial Board Mayor of Lubao	June 30, 2025
Quezon (list)		Angelina Tan	NPC (Stan Q)	2	October 1, 1971 (age 55)	Physician House of Representatives	June 30, 2022
Quirino (list)		Julius Caesar Vaquilar	PFP	0	July 1, 1970 (age 56)	Registered nurse, pastor Vice Governor of Quirino Quirino Provincial Board	September 15, 2026 (Note: Julius Caesar Vaquilar assumed office on September 15, 2026, after Dakila Cua died.)
Rizal (list)		Nina Ynares	NPC	2	October 20, 1970 (age 56)	Government Service Insurance System board member	June 30, 2022
Romblon (list)		Trina Firmalo-Fabic	Liberal	1	February 18, 1982 (age 44)	Environmental planner Mayor of Odiongan	June 30, 2025
Samar (list)		Sharee Ann Tan	Nacionalista	2	May 11, 1982 (age 44)	Pharmacist House of Representatives Governor of Samar	June 30, 2022
Sarangani (list)		Rogelio Pacquiao	PFP	2	June 17, 1982 (age 44)	House of Representatives	June 30, 2022
Siquijor (list)		Jake Vincent Villa	PFP	2	May 1, 1989 (age 37)	House of Representatives	June 30, 2022
Sorsogon (list)		Jose Edwin Hamor	NPC	2	September 11, 1959 (age 67)	Businessman Mayor of Casiguran	June 30, 2022
South Cotabato (list)		Reynaldo Tamayo Jr.	PFP	3	September 11, 1959 (age 67)	Mayor of Tupi	June 30, 2019
Southern Leyte (list)		Damian Mercado	PFP	3	November 24, 1954 (age 71)	House of Representatives Governor of Southern Leyte Mayor of Maasin	October 31, 2018 (Note: Damian Mercado was reinstated on October 31, 2018, after being dismissed on August 10, 2017. Prior to his dismissal, Mercado assumed office on June 30, 2016.)
Sultan Kudarat (list)		Pax Ali Mangudadatu	Lakas	2	October 12, 1997 (age 29)	Mayor of Datu Abdullah Sangki	June 30, 2022
Sulu (list)		Abdusakur Tan II	Lakas	1	March 17, 1977 (age 49)	Vice Governor of Sulu Governor of Sulu	June 30, 2025
Surigao del Norte (list)		Robert Lyndon Barbers	Nacionalista	2	July 15, 1968 (age 58)	Governor of Surigao del Norte	June 30, 2022
Surigao del Sur (list)		Johnny Pimentel	NUP	1	March 29, 1956 (age 70)	Businessman House of Representatives Governor of Surigao del Sur Provincial Administrator of Surigao del Sur Vice Governor of Surigao del Sur	June 30, 2025
Tarlac (list)		Christian Yap	SST	1	April 29, 1985 (age 41)	House of Representatives Mayor of Victoria	June 30, 2025
Tawi-Tawi (list)		Yshmael Sali	PDP–Laban	3	March 10, 1964 (age 62)	Mayor of Languyan	June 30, 2019
Zambales (list)		Jun Ebdane	PFP (SZP)	3	December 30, 1948 (age 77)	Engineer Governor of Zambales Secretary of Public Works and Highways Secretary of National Defense Chief of the Philippine National Police	June 30, 2019
Zamboanga del Norte (list)		Darel Uy	Nacionalista	1	August 1, 1979 (age 47)	Mayor of Dipolog	June 30, 2025
Zamboanga del Sur (list)		Divina Grace Yu	Lakas	1	April 21, 1974 (age 52)	House of Representatives Vice Mayor of Pagadian	June 30, 2025
Zamboanga Sibugay (list)		Dulce Ann Hofer	PFP	2	June 3, 1967 (age 59)	Educator House of Representatives	June 30, 2022

== See also ==
- List of current Philippine vice governors
- List of female governors in the Philippines
- Governor of the Autonomous Region in Muslim Mindanao, head of the defunct Autonomous Region in Muslim Mindanao
- Governor of Metro Manila, defunct position
- Governor-General of the Philippines
- Gobernadorcillo
