= 2025 Quirino local elections =

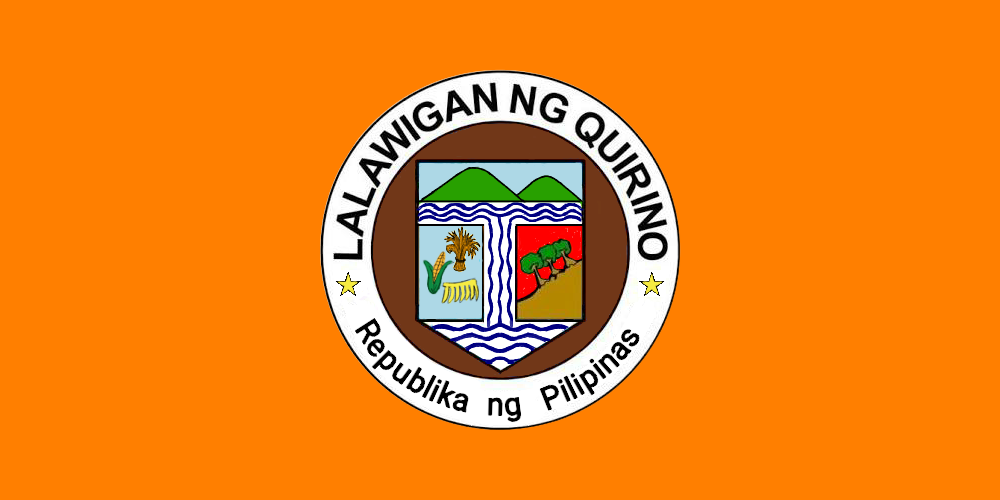
- May 12, 2025
- Gubernatorial election
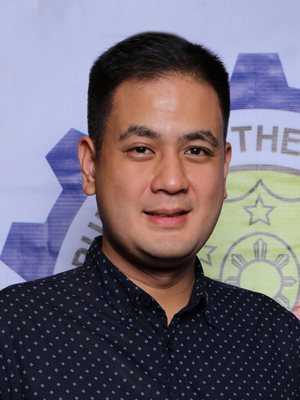
Candidate	Dakila Cua
Party	PFP
Running mate	Jojo Vaquilar
Incumbent Governor
Dakila Cua
PFP
- Vice gubernatorial election
	PFP
Candidate	Jojo Vaquilar
Party	PFP
Incumbent Vice Governor
Jojo Vaquilar
PFP
- Provincial Board election
- 10 out of 14 seats in the Quirino Provincial Board; 8 seats needed for a majority
Party	Current seats
PFP	4
Liberal	1
Nacionalista	1
NPC	1
Reporma	1

Local elections were held in Quirino on May 12, 2025, as part of the 2025 Philippine general election. Voters elected a governor, a vice governor, and 10 out of 14 members of the Quirino Provincial Board.

== Governor ==
Incumbent Dakila Cua (Partido Federal ng Pilipinas) is running for a third term unopposed. Cua was re-elected under Pederalismo ng Dugong Dakilang Samahan with 81.65% of the vote in 2022.

=== Candidates ===
The following candidates are included in the ballot:

No.	Candidate	Party
1	Dakila Cua (incumbent)	Partido Federal ng Pilipinas

=== Results ===
Candidate	Party	Votes	%
Dakila Cua (incumbent)	Partido Federal ng Pilipinas	97,595	100.00
Total		97,595	100.00

== Vice governor ==
Incumbent Jojo Vaquilar (Partido Federal ng Pilipinas) for a third term unopposed. Vaquilar was re-elected under PDP–Laban with 65.77% of the vote in 2022.

=== Candidates ===
The following candidates are included in the ballot:

No.	Candidate	Party
1	Jojo Vaquilar (incumbent)	Partido Federal ng Pilipinas

=== Results ===
Candidate	Party	Votes	%
Jojo Vaquilar (incumbent)	Partido Federal ng Pilipinas	83,977	100.00
Total		83,977	100.00

== Provincial Board ==
Since Quirino's reclassification as a 1st class province in 2025, the Quirino Provincial Board is composed of 14 board members, 10 of whom are elected.

=== Retiring and term-limited board members ===
The following board members are retiring:

- Mercy Pagbilao (Nationalist People's Coalition, 1st provincial district)

The following board members are term-limited:

- Jovino Navalta (Partido para sa Demokratikong Reporma, 1st provincial district)
- Elizabeth Saure (Nacionalista Party, 2nd provincial district)

=== Overview ===
Party	Votes	%	Seats
Partido Federal ng Pilipinas	193,360	56.65	7
Partido Demokratiko Pilipino	24,982	7.32	–
Nationalist People's Coalition	23,749	6.96	1
Independent	99,250	29.08	2
Total	341,341	100.00	10

=== 1st provincial district ===
Quirino's 1st provincial district consists of the municipalities of Cabarroguis, Diffun and Saguday. Five board members are elected by this provincial district.

==== Candidates ====
The following candidates are included in the ballot:

No.	Candidate	Party
1	Willard Abuan	Independent
2	Martin Bulayo Sr.	Nationalist People's Coalition
3	Roseller Escobar	Partido Federal ng Pilipinas
4	Marlo Guillermo (incumbent)	Partido Federal ng Pilipinas
5	Michael Lidiang	Independent
6	Babylyn Reyes (incumbent)	Partido Federal ng Pilipinas
7	Lilybeth Yogyog	Independent

==== Results ====
Candidate	Party	Votes	%
Lilybeth Yogyog	Independent	34,796	19.75
Babylyn Reyes (incumbent)	Partido Federal ng Pilipinas	29,348	16.66
Marlo Guillermo (incumbent)	Partido Federal ng Pilipinas	29,312	16.64
Martin Bulayo Sr.	Nationalist People's Coalition	23,749	13.48
Roseller Escobar	Partido Federal ng Pilipinas	22,484	12.76
Willard Abuan	Independent	21,537	12.22
Michael Lidiang	Independent	14,961	8.49
Total		176,187	100.00

=== 2nd provincial district ===
Quirino's 2nd provincial district consists of the municipalities of Aglipay, Maddela and Nagtipunan. Five board members are elected by this provincial district.

==== Candidates ====
The following candidates are included in the ballot:

No.	Candidate	Party
1	Celso Albano	Independent
2	Tomas Baccac	Partido Federal ng Pilipinas
3	Melanie Batara	Partido Demokratiko Pilipino
4	Linda Dacmay (incumbent)	Partido Federal ng Pilipinas
5	Roy Saladino (incumbent)	Partido Federal ng Pilipinas
6	Alegre Ylanan (incumbent)	Partido Federal ng Pilipinas

==== Results ====
Candidate	Party	Votes	%
Linda Dacmay (incumbent)	Partido Federal ng Pilipinas	29,613	17.93
Tomas Baccac	Partido Federal ng Pilipinas	29,053	17.59
Celso Albano	Independent	27,956	16.93
Roy Saladino (incumbent)	Partido Federal ng Pilipinas	27,600	16.71
Alegre Ylanan (incumbent)	Partido Federal ng Pilipinas	25,950	15.71
Melanie Batara	Partido Demokratiko Pilipino	24,982	15.13
Total		165,154	100.00
