= List of current Philippine vice governors =

List of all the vice governors of the Philippines

The Philippines has 82 provinces. Each province has a vice governor who serves as the presiding officer of the sangguniang panlalawigan. The vice governor assumes the office of governor when there is a permanent vacancy. When the office of governor is temporarily vacant, the vice governor assumes office as acting governor. The vice governor is elected by the voters in the province for a three-year term with a maximum of three consecutive terms. To run for vice governor, a candidate must be a Philippine citizen, a registered voter in the province, a resident of the province for at least one year before the election, able to read or write Filipino or any other local language or dialect and at least 23 years old on election day.

The current terms of the vice governors are from June 30, 2025 until June 30, 2028.

== List ==
| Province | Portrait | Vice governor | Party | Term | Born | Prior experience | Assumed office |
|---|---|---|---|---|---|---|---|
| Abra | | Anne Bersamin | PFP | 1 | January 14, 1967 (age 59) | Abra Provincial Board | June 30, 2025 |
| Agusan del Norte | | Enrico Corvera | PDP–Laban | 2 | May 10, 1954 (age 72) | Mayor of Nasipit Vice Governor of Agusan del Norte | June 30, 2022 |
| Agusan del Sur | | Pat Plaza | NUP | 1 | November 24, 1988 (age 37) | Political staffer | June 30, 2025 |
| Aklan | | Dexter Calizo | Lakas | 1 | May 27, 1990 (age 36) | Mayor of Balete | June 30, 2025 |
| Albay (list) | | Farida Co | Lakas | 1 | July 24, 1978 (age 48) | Businesswoman | June 30, 2025 |
| Antique | | Genevive Reyes | NUP | 1 | October 14, 1984 (age 42) | Entrepreneur Vice Mayor of Caluya Mayor of Caluya | June 30, 2025 |
| Apayao | | Kyle Bulut | Lakas | 1 | March 19, 1993 (age 33) | Apayao Provincial Board | June 30, 2025 |
| Aurora | | Patrick Alexis Angara | LDP | 0 | August 8, 1993 (age 33) | Aurora Provincial Board | September 24, 2025 (Note: Patrick Alexis Angara assumed office on September 24, 2025, after Isidro Galban assumed office as governor upon Reynante Tolentino's death.) |
| Basilan | | Hadjiman Hataman Salliman | PFP | 1 | August 12, 1962 (age 64) | Governor of Basilan House of Representatives Mayor of Sumisip | June 30, 2025 |
| Bataan | | Maria Cristina Garcia | PFP | 3 | February 2, 1969 (age 57) | Provincial government program coordinator | June 5, 2017 (Note: Maria Cristina Garcia assumed office on June 5, 2017, after substituting for Tet Garcia, who was elected in the 2016 vice gubernatorial election but died before assuming office.) |
| Batanes | | Jhong Nanud | PFP | 1 | May 15, 1984 (age 42) | Mayor of Uyugan | June 30, 2025 |
| Batangas | | Hermilando Mandanas | PDP–Laban | 1 | March 25, 1944 (age 82) | Governor of Batangas House of Representatives | June 30, 2025 |
| Benguet | | Marie Rose Fongwan-Kepes | PFP | 1 | January 31, 1972 (age 54) | Benguet Provincial Board | June 30, 2025 |
| Biliran | | Roselyn Espina-Paras | Lakas | 1 | August 3, 1975 (age 51) | Businesswoman Biliran Provincial Board | June 30, 2025 |
| Bohol | | Nick Besas | Nacionalista | 1 | January 10, 1952 (age 74) | Bohol Philippine Councilors League President Tagbilaran City Council | June 30, 2025 |
| Bukidnon (list) | | Clive Quiño | BPP | 2 | June 6, 1978 (age 48) | Businessman Bukidnon Provincial Board | June 30, 2022 |
| Bulacan | | Alex Castro | NUP | 2 | September 27, 1985 (age 41) | Model, singer, actor Bulacan Provincial Board Marilao Municipal Council Marilao Sangguniang Kabataan Federation President | June 30, 2022 |
| Cagayan | | Manuel Mamba | Nacionalista | 1 | August 19, 1958 (age 68) | Physician Governor of Cagayan Secretary of the Presidential Legislative Liaison Office House of Representatives Mayor of Tuao Cagayan Provincial Board | June 30, 2025 |
| Camarines Norte | | Joseph Ascutia | Liberal | 2 | November 16, 1963 (age 62) | Engineer Mayor of Labo | June 30, 2022 |
| Camarines Sur | | Sal Fortuno Jr. | NUP | 2 | March 26, 1989 (age 37) | Entrepreneur | June 30, 2022 |
| Camiguin | | Rodin Romualdo | PFP | 2 | April 22, 1964 (age 62) | Camiguin Provincial Board | June 30, 2022 |
| Capiz | | Jaime Magbanua | Lakas (One Capiz) | 3 | March 13, 1958 (age 68) | Nurse, businessman | June 30, 2019 |
| Catanduanes | | Obet Fernandez | Lakas | 1 | March 11, 1966 (age 60) | Catanduanes Provincial Board Mayor of Panganiban Vice Mayor of Panganiban | June 30, 2025 |
| Cavite | | Ram Revilla Bautista | Lakas | 1 | December 8, 1998 (age 27) | Cavite Provincial Board | June 30, 2025 |
| Cebu (list) | | Glenn Soco | 1CEBU | 1 | October 20, 1973 (age 53) | Businessman, industrial engineer Cebu Provincial Board | June 30, 2025 |
| Cotabato | | Ella Taliño Taray | Lakas | 1 | August 11, 1997 (age 29) | Business executive | June 30, 2025 |
| Davao de Oro | | Dorothy Gonzaga | PFP | 1 | June 2, 1973 (age 53) | Lawyer Governor of Davao de Oro Associate Justice of the Court of Appeals | June 30, 2025 |
| Davao del Norte | | Clarice Jubahib | PFP | 1 | January 12, 2001 (age 25) | Entrepreneur | June 30, 2025 |
| Davao del Sur | | Marc Douglas Cagas IV | Nacionalista | 1 | April 24, 1976 (age 50) | Farmer Governor of Davao del Sur Vice Governor of Davao del Sur House of Representatives | June 30, 2025 |
| Davao Occidental | | Lorna Bautista-Bandigan | Lakas | 2 | March 25, 1954 (age 72) | House of Representatives | June 30, 2022 |
| Davao Oriental | | Glenda Rabat-Gayta | Nacionalista | 1 | September 14, 1971 (age 55) | Medical technologist, businesswoman Vice Mayor of Mati | June 30, 2025 |
| Dinagat Islands | | Jade Ecleo | PFP | 1 | October 5, 1970 (age 56) | Businesswoman Vice Governor of Dinagat Islands Governor of Dinagat Islands | June 30, 2025 |
| Eastern Samar | | Maricar Goteesan | PFP | 3 | August 3, 1962 (age 64) | Businesswoman Eastern Samar Provincial Board | June 30, 2019 |
| Guimaras | | Cecille Gumarin | NUP | 1 | April 29, 1965 (age 61) | Doctor Guimaras Provincial Board | June 30, 2025 |
| Ifugao (list) | | Omar Habawel | PDP–Laban | 1 | August 24, 1981 (age 45) | Mayor of Lagawe | June 30, 2025 |
| Ilocos Norte | | Matthew Manotoc | Nacionalista | 1 | December 9, 1988 (age 37) | Athlete Governor of Ilocos Norte Ilocos Norte Provincial Board | June 30, 2025 |
| Ilocos Sur | | Ryan Luis Singson | Lakas (Bileg) | 2 | June 1, 1980 (age 46) | Governor of Ilocos Sur House of Representatives | June 30, 2022 |
| Iloilo (list) | | Nathalie Ann Debuque | PFP | 1 | December 22, 1993 (age 32) | Mayor of Anilao | June 30, 2025 |
| Isabela (list) | | Kiko Dy | Lakas | 1 | October 28, 1985 (age 41) | Businessman Mayor of Echague | June 30, 2025 |
| Kalinga | | Dave Odiem | PFP | 1 | February 27, 1975 (age 51) | Lawyer Vice Governor of Kalinga Kalinga Provincial Board | June 30, 2025 |
| La Union (list) | | Eric Sibuma | Lakas | 1 | September 27, 1970 (age 56) | Businessman Mayor of Aringay | June 30, 2025 |
| Laguna (list) | | JM Carait | Lakas | 1 | September 23, 1981 (age 45) | Lawyer Laguna Provincial Board | June 30, 2025 |
| Lanao del Norte | | Allan Lim | Lakas | 2 | January 25, 1952 (age 74) | Businessman Lanao del Norte Provincial Board | June 30, 2022 |
| Lanao del Sur | | Mujam Adiong | Lakas | 3 | March 22, 1994 (age 32) | | June 30, 2019 |
| Leyte | | Sandy Javier | NPC | 2 | January 28, 1951 (age 75) | Businessman, horse breeder Mayor of Javier | June 30, 2022 |
| Maguindanao del Norte | | Marshall Sinsuat | UBJP | 1 | April 21, 1973 (age 53) | Businessman Mayor of Datu Blah T. Sinsuat | June 30, 2025 |
| Maguindanao del Sur | | Hisham Nando | UBJP | 1 | May 25, 1976 (age 50) | Lawyer Development Academy of Bangsamoro executive director | June 30, 2025 |
| Marinduque (list) | | Romulo Bacorro Jr. | Independent | 1 | February 28, 1964 (age 62) | Physician Vice Governor of Marinduque | June 30, 2025 |
| Masbate | | Fernando Talisic | Lakas | 1 | May 20, 1968 (age 58) | Mayor of Esperanza | June 30, 2025 |
| Misamis Occidental | | Rowena Gutierrez | Asenso Pinoy | 2 | March 3, 1971 (age 55) | Business executive | June 30, 2022 |
| Misamis Oriental | | Jigjag Pelaez | Lakas | 3 | October 27, 1975 (age 51) | Misamis Oriental Provincial Board | June 30, 2019 |
| Mountain Province | | Jet Dominguez | Independent | 1 | October 21, 1971 (age 55) | Businessman | June 30, 2025 |
| Negros Occidental | | Joeben Alonso | NUP | 1 | March 29, 1959 (age 67) | Negros Occidental Provincial Board | June 30, 2025 |
| Negros Oriental | | Fritz Diaz | PFP | 1 | December 18, 1979 (age 46) | Businessman Mayor of Siaton | June 30, 2025 |
| Northern Samar | | Clarence Dato | PFP | 2 | September 7, 1972 (age 54) | Lawyer | June 30, 2022 |
| Nueva Ecija | | Lemon Umali | Unang Sigaw | 1 | September 1, 1964 (age 62) | Businessman | June 30, 2025 |
| Nueva Vizcaya (list) | | Eufemia Dacayo | Aksyon | 1 | October 14, 1976 (age 50) | Nueva Vizcaya Provincial Board Mayor of Solano | May 5, 2023 (Note: Eufemia Dacayo assumed office on May 5, 2023, after Jose Gambito assumed office as governor upon Carlos Padilla's death.) |
| Occidental Mindoro | | Diana Apigo-Tayag | PFP | 2 | November 8, 1973 (age 52) | Certified public accountant Occidental Mindoro Provincial Board | June 30, 2022 |
| Oriental Mindoro | | Jojo Perez | MBS | 1 | June 13, 1974 (age 52) | Lawyer Vice Governor of Oriental Mindoro Oriental Mindoro Provincial Board | June 30, 2025 |
| Palawan | | Leoncio Ola | PPPL | 2 | March 28, 1950 (age 76) | Palawan Provincial Board | June 30, 2022 |
| Pangasinan | | Mark Ronald Lambino | Lakas | 3 | May 2, 1982 (age 44) | Consultant Philippine Amusement and Gaming Corporation staff Senate staff House of Representatives staff | June 30, 2019 |
| Pampanga (list) | | Dennis Pineda | NPC (Kambilan) | 1 | May 6, 1974 (age 52) | Businessman Governor of Pampanga Vice Governor of Pampanga Mayor of Lubao Lubao Municipal Council | June 30, 2025 |
| Quezon | | Anacleto Alcala III | NPC (Stan Q) | 2 | December 27, 1979 (age 46) | Vice Mayor of Lucena Lucena City Council | June 30, 2022 |
| Quirino (list) | | Lilybeth Yogyog | Independent | 0 | November 16, 1971 (age 54) | Physician Quirino Provincial Board | September 15, 2026 (Note: Lilybeth Yogyog assumed office on September 15, 2026, after Julius Caesar Vaquilar assumed office as governor upon Dakila Cua's death.) |
| Rizal | | Pining Gatlabayan | NPC | 1 | February 6, 1948 (age 78) | Professor Vice Mayor of Antipolo Antipolo City Council | June 30, 2025 |
| Romblon | | Armando Gutierrez | PFP | 2 | June 26, 1949 (age 77) | Romblon Provincial Board | June 30, 2022 |
| Samar | | Arnold Tan | Nacionalista | 2 | December 14, 1975 (age 50) | Businessman | June 30, 2022 |
| Sarangani | | Bogi Martinez | PCM | 1 | September 14, 1974 (age 52) | Businessman | June 30, 2025 |
| Siquijor | | Dindo Tumala | PFP | 3 | June 26, 1974 (age 52) | Lawyer Siquijor Provincial Board | June 30, 2019 |
| Sorsogon | | Jun Escudero | NPC | 2 | June 3, 1972 (age 54) | Sorsogon Provincial Board | June 30, 2022 |
| South Cotabato | | Arthur Pingoy Jr. | PFP | 2 | December 30, 1958 (age 67) | Physician Governor of South Cotabato House of Representatives | June 30, 2022 |
| Southern Leyte | | Milai Mercado | Lakas | 2 | December 31, 1959 (age 66) | Businesswoman | June 30, 2022 |
| Sultan Kudarat | | Prince Raden Sakaluran | Lakas | 1 | June 22, 1995 (age 31) | Mayor of Lutayan | June 30, 2025 |
| Sulu | | Abdusakur Mahail Tan | Lakas | 1 | July 13, 1950 (age 76) | Governor of Sulu Vice Governor of Sulu House of Representatives Jolo Municipal Council | June 30, 2025 |
| Surigao del Norte | | Eddie Gokiangkee Jr. | Nacionalista | 3 | September 17, 1982 (age 44) | Civil engineer Surigao del Norte Provincial Board | June 30, 2019 |
| Surigao del Sur | | Manuel Alameda | PFP | 2 | October 23, 1959 (age 67) | Surigao del Sur Provincial Board | June 30, 2022 |
| Tarlac | | Lita Aquino | NPC | 1 | June 17, 1948 (age 78) | Mayor of Moncada | June 30, 2025 |
| Tawi-Tawi | | Al-Syed Sali | PFP | 2 | January 9, 1995 (age 31) | Member of the Bangsamoro Transition Authority Parliament | June 30, 2022 |
| Zambales | | Jaq Khonghun | Lakas | 2 | July 30, 1975 (age 51) | | June 30, 2022 |
| Zamboanga del Norte | | Julius Napigquit | Lakas | 2 | August 6, 1963 (age 63) | Lawyer Zamboanga del Norte Provincial Board | June 30, 2022 |
| Zamboanga del Sur | | Roseller Ariosa | PFP | 3 | June 9, 1954 (age 72) | Businessman Vice Governor of Zamboanga del Sur | June 30, 2019 |
| Zamboanga Sibugay | | Richard Olegario | Nacionalista | 1 | July 20, 1983 (age 43) | Zamboanga Sibugay Provincial Board | June 30, 2025 |

== See also ==
- List of current Philippine governors
- Politics of the Philippines
- Deputy Chief Minister of Bangsamoro
