= Orlando Dulay =

Warlord of Quirino (1928–1997)

Mambabatas Pambansa (Assemblyman) from Quirino's district
- In office June 30, 1984 – March 12, 1986

Governor of Quirino
- In office June 30, 1980 – June 30, 1984
- Vice Governor: George Gatchalian
- Preceded by: Dionisio A. Sarandi
- Succeeded by: George Gatchalian

Personal details
- Born: Orlando Castillo Dulay; 1928
- Died: June 2, 1997 (aged 68–69) New Bilibid Prison, Muntinlupa
- Party: Kilusang Bagong Lipunan
- Occupation: Politician
- Profession: Soldier

Military service
- Allegiance: Philippines
- Branch/service: Philippine Constabulary; Philippine Army
- Rank: Colonel
- Battles/wars: Vietnam War; New People's Army rebellion

Orlando Castillo Dulay (1928 – 2 June 1997) was a Filipino politician, military commander and warlord who was the 3rd governor of Quirino. As a strong ally of President Ferdinand Marcos, he was the provincial coordinator of the Kilusang Bagong Lipunan (KBL) in Quirino, and was responsible for silencing Marcos’ critics in the province, leading to the eventual abductions and murders of Francisco Laurella, Fernando Pastor Sr. and Fernando Pastor Jr. in 1986. He was sentenced to life imprisonment in 1990 and died in prison on 2 June 1997.

== Military career ==
In 1971, Dulay fought in the Vietnam War as a military commander under the Philippine Civic Action Group (PHILCAG), being involved in psychological warfare operations. After the Declaration of Martial Law, Dulay, now a major, was assigned as the provincial commander of the Philippine Constabulary in Quirino province on 5 September 1973. As provincial commander, Dulay oversaw the military and law enforcement operations in the province, such as suppressing Ilongot headhunting activities as well as operations conducted by the New People's Army, which infiltrated Quirino after the entrance of NPA leader Victor Corpus a month earlier. Tales were told of Dulay’s career as a supposedly legendary anti-communist fighter. He was later replaced by Lt. Col. Francisco S. Carreon on 3 December 1974.

== Political career ==
=== Warlord of Quirino ===
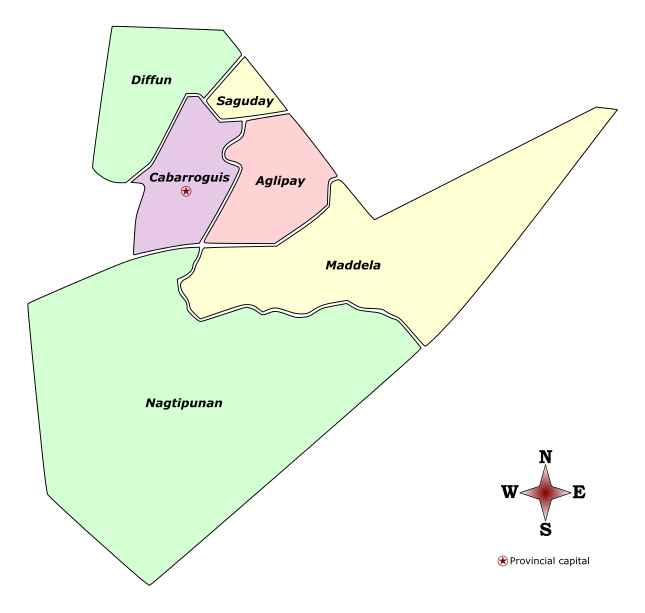
Map of Quirino after it was separated from Nueva Vizcaya on 10 September 1971.

In 1980, Dulay won the gubernatorial elections in Quirino and took office on 30 June of the same year. Dulay’s rule as governor was marked by brutality and human rights abuses, as well as the silencing of the opposition in the province. He owned a private army composed of militiamen and discharged soldiers. He also frequently engaged in land grabbing. After the 1984 Philippine parliamentary election, Dulay won a seat as an assemblyman under the KBL. During the elections, Dulay distributed ₱5,000 ($250) to every village chief in order to win votes.

On 3 May 1985, Dulay filed a libel case at the municipal trial court of Cabarroguis against Benjamin C. Uy, Apolonio Batalla and Ulpiano Quizon, based on their publication at the Tempo newspaper implicating him of the crime of robbery in band.

==== February elections ====
From 6–7 February 1986, some time before the snap presidential election, Dulay was principally responsible for the abduction of Francisco Laurella, Fernando Pastor Sr., and Fernando Pastor Jr., with the former two being leaders of the UNIDO branch in Quirino, at 10 PM. They were murdered on 8 February, and their bodies thrown into a creek at the village of Balete in Diadi, Nueva Vizcaya. Their bodies were found four days later. In another incident, Dulay was also implicated in killing the daughters of opposition leaders in the only village where UNIDO candidate Corazon Aquino won the vote, but was not charged with the incident. Constant threats caused supporters of the opposition to flee the province or take refuge inside churches.

=== Downfall and arrest ===
After the EDSA revolution, Corazon Aquino took office as the new president of the Philippines on 25 February 1986. Right after her assumption into the presidency, Aquino ordered all officials appointed by Marcos to resign. By this point, Dulay had already left the country for the United States. Regardless, he returned to the Philippines and was arrested on 12 March at the Manila International Airport after being caught sneaking into the country from Los Angeles wearing a wig and a black leather jacket under the fake name ‘Alfonso Castro’. He was detained in Camp Crame. On 10 April, a case was filed against him regarding the Laurella-Pastor murders, but a day later he escaped from military detention and flee to the United States. Dulay was arrested by the New Jersey State Police on 26 August in a house owned by Marcos at 3850 Princeton Pike, Lawrence, New Jersey, but was let go because the Philippine Consulate in New York made no request for his arrest. In January 1987, after the Philippine government revoked Dulay’s passport, the US government ordered him to leave the United States in 60 days or face deportation. He returned to the Philippines on 18 March of the same year.

Despite all of these measures taken, Dulay remained in de facto control of the province. After the elections, Dulay expressed his support for the new administration as well as its programs, stating that “The way I see it, you must have your own kingdom, and this is mine."

On 1 May 1987, the Supreme Court in Manila ordered the immediate arrest of Dulay, which took place three days later. The person who was tasked to arrest Dulay was Lt. Col. Jose Dalupines, who was Dulay’s own friend.

=== Rescue attempt, sentencing and death ===
On 11 June 1988, former Presidential Security Command bodyguards of Marcos, composed of about 14-20 men made an attempt to storm Camp Crame to free Dulay, exchanging gunfire with sentries belonging to the Philippine Constabulary. The raiding party was able to acquire 24 automatic rifles during the encounter. However, they were thwarted by government forces under the Constabulary chief Maj. Gen. Ramon Montaño.

Dulay was sentenced to life imprisonment on 12 January 1990 by the Quezon City Regional Trial Court. The decision was affirmed on 18 January 1993 by the Supreme Court.

Dulay was later imprisoned at the New Bilibid Prison in Muntinlupa. He died of a heart attack in the prison hospital on 2 June 1997.

=== Involvement in treasure hunting ===
After the revolution, documents were found in the Malacañang Palace consisting of progress reports regarding the various treasure site excavations. The excavation team included Dulay as well as Fabian Ver, among others.

== Personal life ==
Dulay owned a luxurious mansion at Barangay Banuar, Cabbaroguis in Quirino called the 'Lotus Garden', surrounded by a sizable land space with several coconut plants, trees and grasses. He also owned a garage separate from the Lotus Garden, as well as a place Dulay called the ‘Pavillon’, which was meant to receive and entertain guests. Behind the pavilion was a swimming pool, as well as having a fishpond and a wide parking area near it.

Dulay was also known to have had pet rabbits.

== Political views ==
Dulay was known for being a staunch anti-communist, a Marcos loyalist, and holding anti-American views. When he was asked about his murder case, he would rebuke by stating:

“Look at Uncle Sam. When you dropped that bomb on Hiroshima and Nagasaki, millions of people were killed and injured. That was genocide, no? But who cares? You won the war. You were heroes. So what is two lives, or three lives? Why make a hell out of it. What matters is I, too, will win.”

— Orlando Dulay, Los Angeles Times

== Legacy ==
Dulay, along with Nueva Vizcaya representative Benjamin B. Perez, made efforts to pass Batas Pambansa Blg. 230, which established the Cabarroguis National School of Arts and Trades on 10 June 1983. The operation of the school began on 18 June of the following year.

== See also ==
- Vietnam War
- New People's Army Rebellion
- 1980 Philippine local elections
- 1984 Philippine parliamentary election
- 1986 Philippine presidential election
- Murders of Francisco Laurella, Fernando Pastor Sr., and Fernando Pastor Jr.
- People Power Revolution

Political offices
Preceded by Dionisio A. Sarandi	Governor of Quirino; 1980–1984	Succeeded by George Gatchalian
