= Vaquilar =

Vaquilar is a surname, and may refer to:

- Julius Caesar Vaquilar, Filipino politician
- Nick Vaquilar (born 1970), Filippino Roman-Catholic priest
- Rodil Vaquilar Zalameda, Filipino judge

== See also ==
- Vaquita
- La Vaquerita
