= Murder of Francisco Laurella, Fernando Pastor Sr., and Fernando Pastor Jr. =

Francisco Laurella
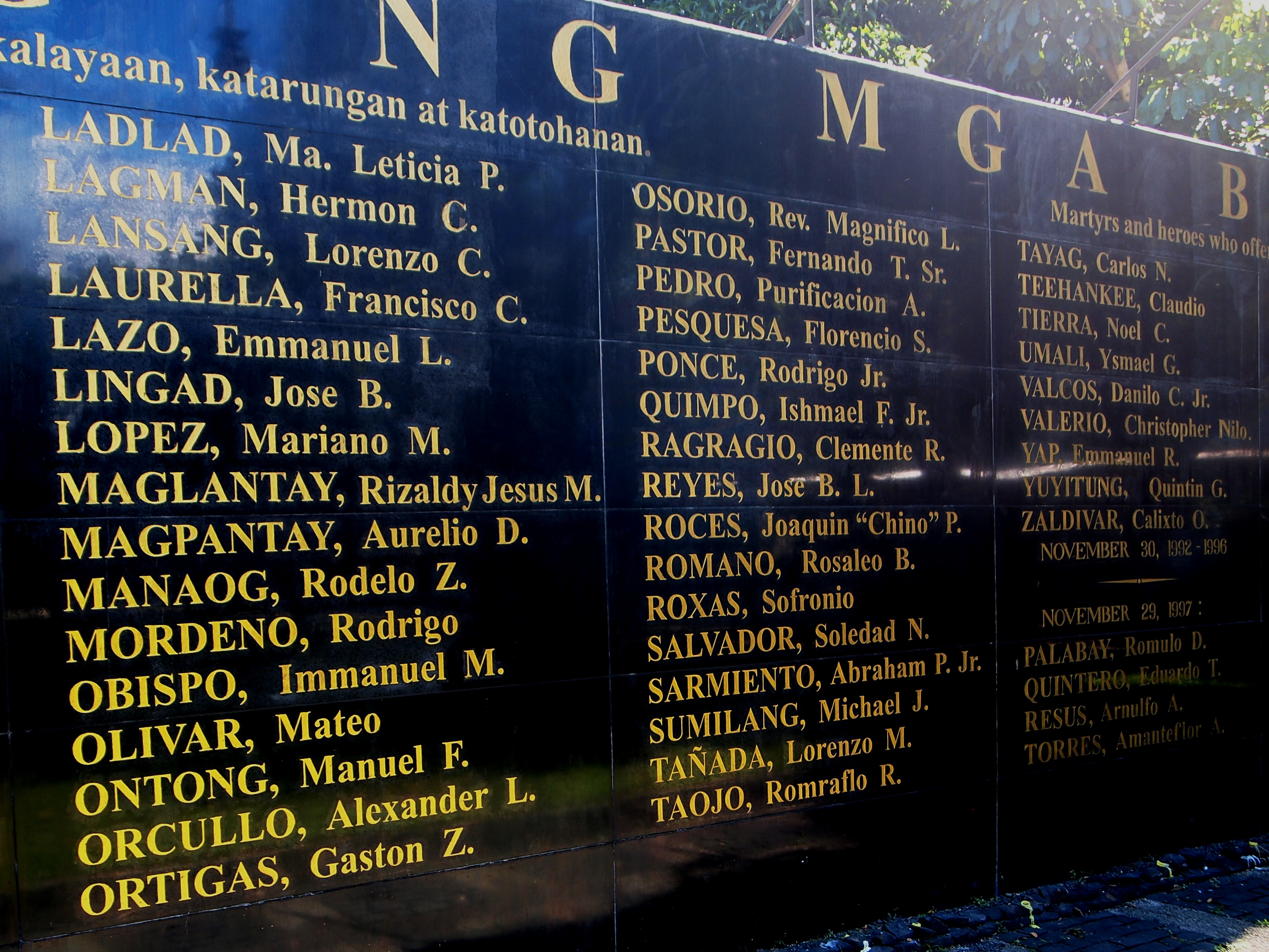
- Detail of the Wall of Remembrance at the Bantayog ng mga Bayani, showing names from the first batch of Bantayog Honorees, including that of Francisco Laurella.
- Born: Francisco C. Laurella; December 3, 1932; Tayug, Pangasinan, Philippines
- Died: February 8, 1986 (aged 53); Diadi, Nueva Vizcaya, Philippines
- Cause of death: Assassination
- Other name: Frank
- Education: Arellano University
- Spouse: Belen Mabbayad
- Children: 3

Fernando Pastor, Sr.
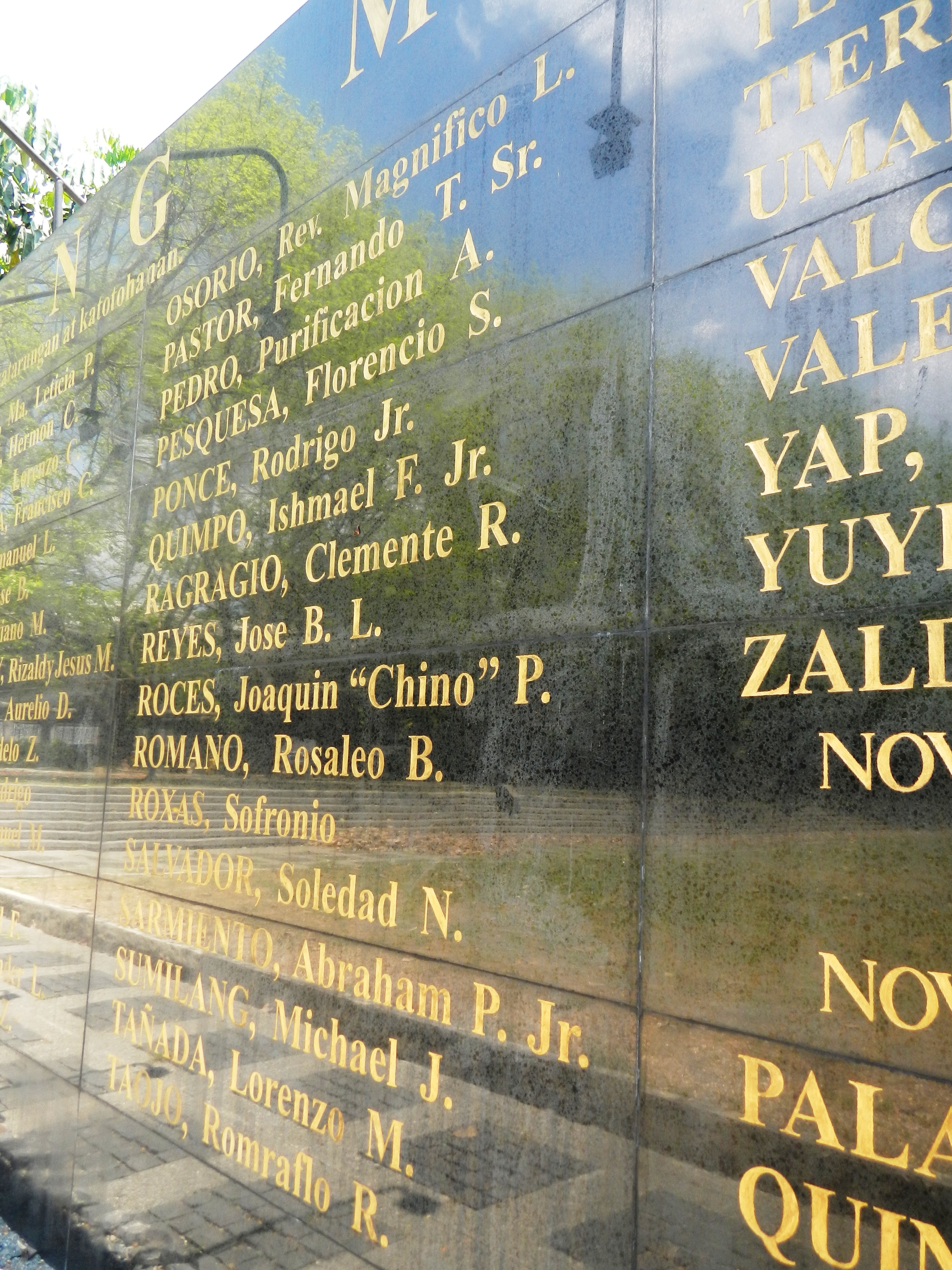
- Detail of the Wall of Remembrance at the Bantayog ng mga Bayani, showing names from the first batch of Bantayog Honorees, including that of Fernando Pastor, Sr.
- Born: Fernando Tamayo Pastor, Sr. May 25, 1935; Tayug, Pangasinan, Philippines
- Died: February 8, 1986 (aged 50); Cabarroguis, Quirino, Philippines
- Cause of death: Assassination
- Education: Luna Colleges; Philippine Bible College
- Occupation: Pastor
- Spouse: Cristeta Ceazar
- Children: 6
- Parent(s): Maximo Pastor; Maria Tamayo

The murder of Francisco Laurella, Fernando Pastor Sr., and Fernando Pastor Jr. in Cabarroguis, Quirino on February 8, 1986, were three of numerous violent incidents associated with the Philippines' snap presidential elections of 1986. Quirino province assemblyman Orlando Dulay, who was the provincial coordinator of Ferdinand Marcos' political party, the Kilusang Bagong Lipunan (KBL) was caught and found guilty of the murders in 1990.

On February 6, 1986 – the eve of the snap presidential elections – Fernando Pastor Sr., his oldest son Fernando Pastor Jr. and colleague Francisco Laurella were walking on their way home when they were abducted by Dulay and two of his men.

The three were taken to Dulay's residence in Cabarroguis, Quirino, and kept inside a van for three days. The tortured and mutilated bodies of the younger Pastor and Francisco Laurella were found near a ravine three days later, and that of the elder Pastor five days after.

Dulay was eventually caught and charged in 1990, and was sentenced to life imprisonment by the Quezon City regional trial court.

Today, Laurella and Pastor Sr.'s names are engraved on Bantayog ng mga Bayani's Wall of Remembrance, which honors martyrs and heroes who fought against the Marcos dictatorship.

== See also ==
- Martial law under Ferdinand Marcos
- List of torture methods used by the Marcos dictatorship
- Kilusang Bagong Lipunan
- 1986 Philippine presidential election
