= Glenn Chong =

Filipino lawyer and politician (born 1974)

The Honorable Glenn A. Chong
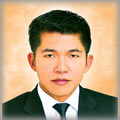
- Official portrait, 2007

Member of the House of Representatives from Biliran's at-large district
- In office June 30, 2007 – June 30, 2010
- Preceded by: Gerardo Espina Jr.
- Succeeded by: Rogelio Espina

Personal details
- Born: Glenn Ang Chong; July 12, 1974 (age 52) Cebu City, Philippines
- Party: KDP (2018–present)
- Other political affiliations: PMP (2012–2018); Lakas–CMD (2007–2012); Liberal (until 2007)
- Education: Cebu Institute of Technology (BS); University of San Carlos (LL.B)
- Occupation: Politician
- Profession: Lawyer, accountant

Glenn Ang Chong (born July 12, 1974) is a Filipino lawyer and politician. He was elected as a Member of the House of Representatives, representing the Lone District of Biliran. He held the position for three years before he lost his re-election bid to Rogelio Espina.

== Early life and education ==
Chong was born on July 12, 1974, in Cebu City to Charlie Chong and Adelfa Ang, being the eldest of three children. He completed his elementary and high school as a valedictorian. He finished his accountancy degree at the Cebu Institute of Technology as his pre-law course. He later obtained his law degree at the University of San Carlos, graduating as a cum laude). After which, he became a lawyer and certified public accountant by profession. He obtained his Doctor of Humanities (Honoris Causa) degree in University of San Carlos.

== Political career ==
He won his election in 2007 after defeating former Representative Gerardo Espina Sr., who had held the seat from 1995 to 2004, making him the very first representative of Biliran who did not belong to Espina political clan. However, he was defeated when he sought re-election in 2010 and a comeback in 2013, both to Rogelio Espina. He ran under Lakas–Kampi and Pwersa ng Masang Pilipino, respectively.

Chong was a candidate for Senator of the Philippines in the 2019 Philippine general election, but lost.

== Ambush ==
Chong's father, Charlie, was ambushed but not hurt, on the street fronting his Biliran house on June 7, 2008. His two bodyguards were killed while another was seriously wounded by four armed men, which included a policeman assigned to the Naval police headquarters who was arrested. Chong accused his family's political enemies for the attack, since his father filed a 2007 graft case against Biliran Gov. Rogelio Espina with the Ombudsman.

Richard "Red" Santillan, Chong's close aide, was ambushed in Cainta, Rizal on December 9, 2018. His body was recovered the following day. Thirty bullet holes were found in Chong's car, which Santillan was driving at the time of ambush. Santillan was with a female companion, who was also killed, in the car, wherein he was on the way to bring her home when the incident happened. Chong then is a vocal Smartmatic critic, having testified about electoral fraud in both Senate and House hearings. The Public Attorney's Office filed charges against the policemen who are believed involved. In 2019, the National Bureau of Investigation recommended murder charges against 22 policemen for the killing, saying that it was a rubout and not an encounter, as claimed by the police. Later that year, the Antipolo Regional Trial Court issued an arrest warrant for 20 police officers, each had charged with two counts of murder, with no bail recommended; twelve of them have been surrendered.

== Legal issues ==
On March 15, 2024, Ace Barbers and Johnny Pimentel demanded that Chong apologize to First Lady Liza Araneta Marcos over his "slap threat" during the Apollo Quiboloy prayer rally. In a disbarment complaint letter to Chief Justice Alexander Gesmundo, Bureau of Immigration Commissioner Daniel Laogan said Chong's remarks were “unethical” and violated A.M. No. 22-09-01-SC, the new "Code of Professional Responsibility and Accountability".

House of Representatives of the Philippines
Preceded by Gerardo J. Espina Jr.	Member of the House of Representatives from Biliran's at-large district 2007–2010	Succeeded by Rogelio J. Espina
