= Alfredo Bantug =

Filipino politician (1909–1996)

The Honorable Alfredo Bantug
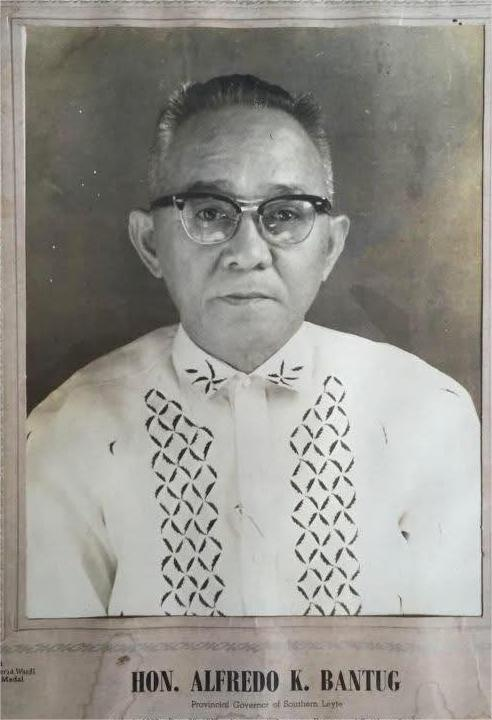
- Portrait as Governor of Southern Leyte in 1963

Governor of Southern Leyte
- In office 1960–1967
- Appointed by: Carlos P. Garcia
- Preceded by: Office created
- Succeeded by: Salvacion Oppus Yniguez

Mayor of Maasin
- In office 1944–1960

Personal details
- Born: Alfredo Kangleon Bantug; July 31, 1909
- Died: May 20, 1996 (aged 86)
- Party: Nacionalista

Alfredo Kangleon Bantug Sr. (July 31, 1909 – May 20, 1996) was a Filipino politician who was the first governor of Southern Leyte.

Bantug attended Maasin Institute (MI, now the College of Maasin) where he later worked as a teacher. He became Mayor of Maasin in 1944 and fought in World War II as a guerilla, gaining recognition for establishing a provincial federation of retirees. He was also a labor union leader.

In 1960, he was appointed as the first governor of the newly founded province of Southern Leyte, ending his tenure as mayor, which was supposed to last until 1963. He was elected as governor of Southern Leyte in 1967 and served as the executive head of the province until he lost the gubernatorial election to Salvacion Yniguez. Prior to his retirement from politics, he served as barangay captain of Tagnipa .

The provincial office of the Philippine National Police was posthumously named after Bantug.
