= Governor of Biliran =

Local chief executive

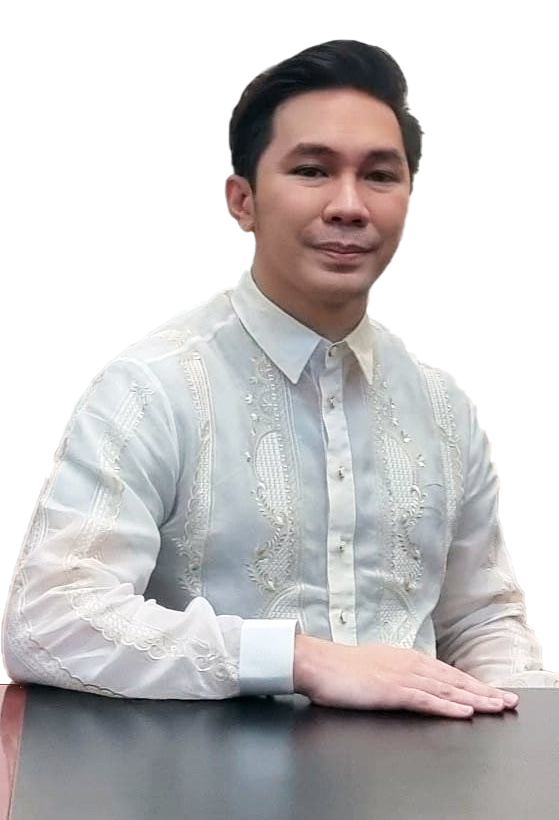
- Incumbent; Gerard Roger Espina since June 30, 2022
- Style: His Excellency, The Honorable
- Seat: Biliran Provincial Capitol
- Term length: 3 years, renewable for 3 consecutive terms
- Inaugural holder: Uldarico R. Reyes (Sub-Province); Wayne M. Jaro (Province)
- Formation: April 8, 1959 (as Sub-Province of Leyte by virtue of Republic Act No. 2141); May 11, 1992 (as Independent Province by virtue of Republic Act No. 7160)
- Deputy: Vice Governor Brigido C. Caneja III
- Website: Official website

The governor of Biliran (Filipino: Punong Lalawigan ng Biliran) is the local chief executive of the Philippine province of Biliran. The governor holds office at the Biliran Provincial Capitol located at Brgy. Calumpang, Naval, Biliran. Like all local government heads in the Philippines, the governor is elected via popular vote, and may not be elected for a fourth consecutive term (although the former governor may return to office after an interval of one term). In case of death, resignation or incapacity, the vice governor becomes the governor.

The current governor is Rogelio J. Espina who was elected during the last May 13, 2019 local elections. He previously served as governor for 3 consecutive terms from 2001 to 2010.

== History ==
On April 15, 1959, President Carlos P. Garcia appointed Caibiran Mayor Uldarico R. Reyes as its first lieutenant governor of Biliran which was made as a sub-province of Leyte after the enactment of Republic Act No. 2141. Reyes assumed the position on October 25, 1959. Thereafter, the position was generally elected.

Subsequently, the title of lieutenant governor was changed into a governor on June 21, 1969 pursuant to Republic Act No. 5977 thereby giving the office holder the executive powers of a provincial governor.

== List of governors ==
This is the list of governors who served the province of Biliran since becoming a sub-province of Leyte to the present day:

=== Sub-province of Leyte ===
No. overall	No. in period	Lieutenant Governor	Start of term	End of term	Special Board Member
Biliran Sub-Province of Leyte (1959-1992)
1	1	Uldarico R. Reyes	1959	1963	Carlota Limpiado
2	2	Jorge A. Zamora	1963	1967	Jesus Maderazo
(1)	(1)	Uldarico R. Reyes	1967 ^{1}	1971	Leoncio Limpiado
3	3	Teofilo D. Sabonsolin	1971	1980	Hospicio Tiu
3	3	Teofilo D. Sabonsolin	1980 ^{2}	1986	Hospicio Tiu
4	4	Jose C. Gonzales ^{3}	1986	1986	Arturo A. Velasquez ^{3}
—	—	Lolita S. Velasquez ^{4}	1986	1987	Dalmacio Colasito, Jr.
—	—	Jacinto Barbanida ^{4}	1987	1987	Dalmacio Colasito, Jr.
(4)	(4)	Jose C. Gonzales	1987	1992	Dalmacio Colasito, Jr.
5	5	Wayne M. Jaro ^{4}	1992	1992	Dalmacio Colasito, Jr.

Notes
^{1} The title of lieutenant governor was changed into a governor on June 21, 1969 pursuant to Republic Act No. 5977.
^{2} Term extended without election.
^{3} Office-in-charge.
^{4} Governor-appointee.

=== Province ===
No. overall	No. in period	Image	Governor	Start of term	End of term	Vice Governor
Province of Biliran (1992–present)
(5)	1		Wayne M. Jaro	1992 ^{1}	1995	Danilo M. Parilla
(5)	1		Wayne M. Jaro	1995	1998	Danilo M. Parilla
6	2		Danilo M. Parilla	1998	2001	Carlos L. Chan
7	3		Rogelio J. Espina	2001	2004	Carlos L. Chan
7	3		Rogelio J. Espina	2004	2007	Carlos L. Chan
7	3		Rogelio J. Espina	2007	2010	Lucila C. Curso
8	4		Gerardo J. Espina, Jr.	2010	2013	Manuel Montejo
8	4		Gerardo J. Espina, Jr.	2013	2016	Eriberto D. Tubis, Jr.
8	4		Gerardo J. Espina, Jr.	2016	2019	Eriberto D. Tubis, Jr.
(7)	(3)		Rogelio J. Espina	2019	2022	Brigido C. Caneja III
9	5		Gerard Roger Espina	2022	present	Brigido C. Caneja III

Notes
^{1} Appointed.
