= Rogelio Espina =

Filipino politician

The Honorable Rogelio Espina

Governor of Biliran
- Incumbent
- Assumed office June 30, 2025
- Vice Governor: Roselyn Espina-Paras
- Preceded by: Gerard Roger Espina
- In office June 30, 2019 – June 30, 2022
- Vice Governor: Brigido Caneja III
- Preceded by: Gerardo Espina Jr.
- Succeeded by: Gerard Roger Espina
- In office June 30, 2001 – June 30, 2010
- Vice Governor: Carlos L. Chan (2001–2007); Lucila Curso (2007–2010)
- Preceded by: Danilo M. Parilla
- Succeeded by: Gerardo Espina Jr.

Member of the Philippine House of Representatives from Biliran
- In office June 30, 2010 – June 30, 2019
- Preceded by: Glenn Chong
- Succeeded by: Gerardo Espina Jr.

Medical Specialist at Department of Health Valenzuela District
- In office January 1, 1997 – April 1, 1998

Personal details
- Born: Rogelio Jimenez Espina; June 30, 1960 (age 66) Sampaloc, Manila, Philippines
- Party: Nacionalista (2009-2012; 2016-present)
- Other political affiliations: Liberal (2012-2016); Lakas-CMD (until 2009)
- Spouse: Cecil M. Espina
- Children: Gerry Victor Espina; Gerard Roger Espina; Gretchen Stephanie Espina
- Parents: Gerardo S. Espina, Sr. (father); Asuncion S. Jimenez (mother)
- Education: Far Eastern University (BS, MD)
- Occupation: Doctor

Rogelio "Roger" Jimenez Espina (born June 30, 1960) is a Filipino politician from Biliran, Philippines. He was the governor of Biliran from 2019 to 2022, and previously from 2001 to 2010. He also served as representative for the lone district of Biliran from 2010 to 2019.

== Early life ==
Espina was born in Manila, Philippines. From 1976 to 1980, he studied at the Far Eastern University with a bachelor's degree on zoology. From 1980 to 1984 at the same school, he studied a degree on Doctor of Medicine. He was a medical specialist in the Philippine Department of Health (Valenzuela District) from January 1, 1997 to April 1, 1998.

Political offices
Preceded by Danilo M. Parilla	Governor of Biliran; 2001–2010; 2019–2022; 2025–present	Succeeded by Gerardo J. Espina Jr.
Preceded by Gerardo J. Espina Jr.	Governor of Biliran; 2001–2010; 2019–2022; 2025–present	Succeeded by Gerard Roger Espina
Preceded by Gerard Roger Espina	Governor of Biliran; 2001–2010; 2019–2022; 2025–present	Incumbent
House of Representatives of the Philippines
Preceded by Glenn A. Chong	Member of the House of Representatives from Biliran's at-large district 2010–2019	Succeeded by Gerardo J. Espina Jr.
