= Quirino Provincial Board =

Legislative body of the province of Quirino, Philippines

Quirino Provincial Board Sangguniang Panlalawigan ng Quirino

Type
- Type: Unicameral
- Term limits: 3 terms (9 years)

Leadership
- Presiding Officer: Lilybeth H. Yogyog, Independent since September 15, 2026

Structure
- Seats: 14 board members 1 ex officio presiding officer
- Political groups: PFP (7) NPC (1) Independent (2) TBD (1) Nonpartisan (3)
- Length of term: 3 years
- Authority: Local Government Code of the Philippines

Elections
- Voting system: Multiple non-transferable vote (regular members); Indirect election (ex officio members); Acclamation (sectoral member)
- Last election: May 12, 2025
- Next election: May 15, 2028

Meeting place
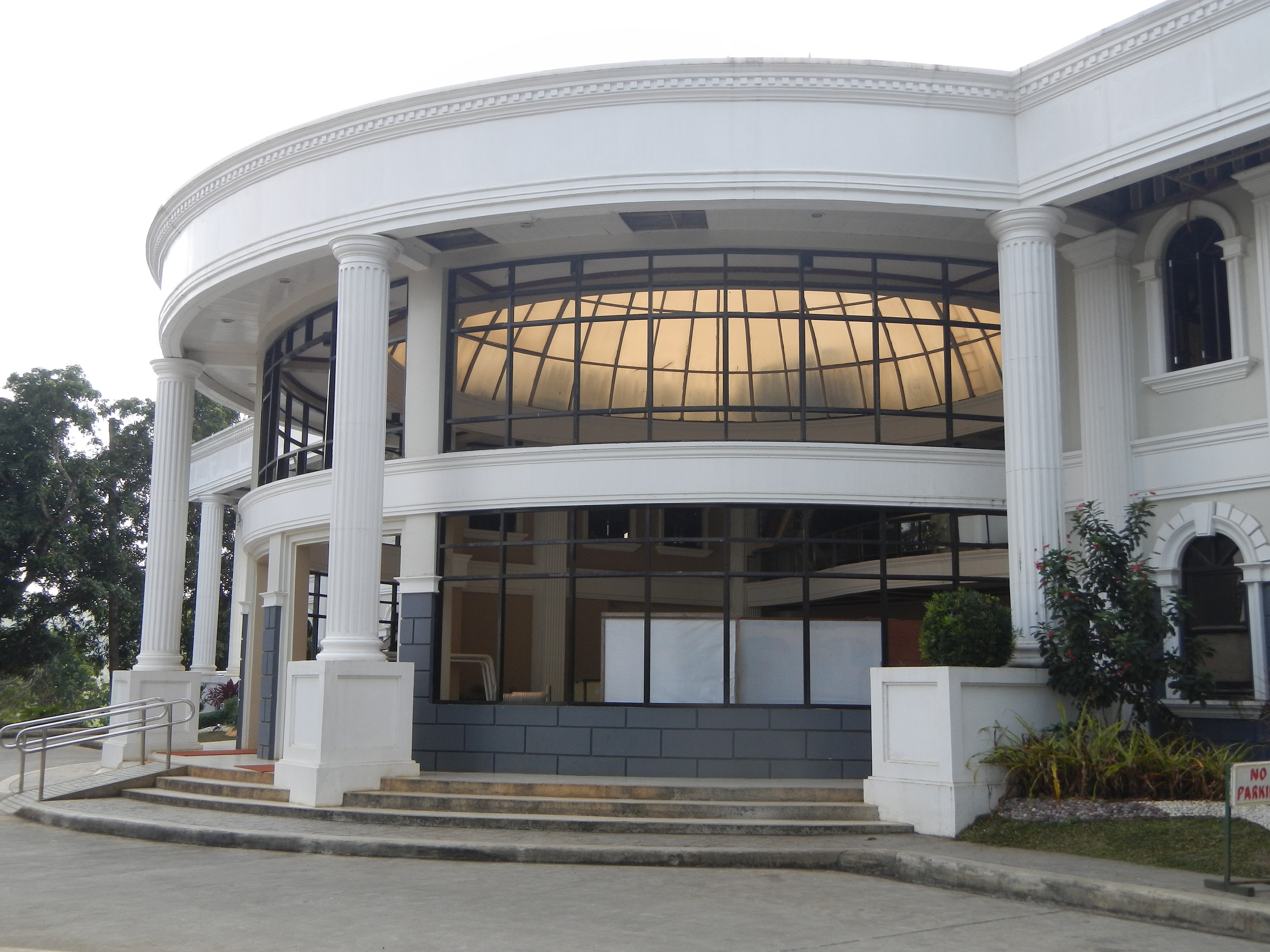
- Quirino Legislative Building, Cabarroguis

The Quirino Provincial Board is the Sangguniang Panlalawigan (provincial legislature) of the Philippine province of Quirino.

The members are elected via plurality-at-large voting: the province is divided into two districts, each having four seats. A voter votes up to four names, with the top four candidates per district being elected. The vice governor is the ex officio presiding officer, and only votes to break ties. The vice governor is elected via the plurality voting system province-wide.

The districts used in appropriation of members is not coextensive with the legislative district of Quirino; unlike congressional representation which is at-large, Quirino is divided into two districts for representation in the Sangguniang Panlalawigan.

Aside from the regular members, the board also includes the provincial federation presidents of the Liga ng mga Barangay (ABC, from its old name "Association of Barangay Captains"), the Sangguniang Kabataan (SK, youth councils) and the Philippine Councilors League (PCL). Quirino's provincial board also has a reserved seat for its indigenous people (IPMR).

== Apportionment ==
Elections	Seats per district		Ex officio seats	Reserved seats	Total seats
Elections	1st	2nd	Ex officio seats	Reserved seats	Total seats
2010–2025	4	4	3	1	12
2025–present	5	5	3	1	14

== List of members ==
=== Current members ===
These are the members after the 2025 local elections and 2023 barangay and SK elections:

- Vice Governor: Lilybeth H. Yogyog (Independent)

Seat	Board member	Party	Start of term	End of term
1st district	Babylyn G. Reyes	PFP	June 30, 2019	June 30, 2028
1st district	Marlo S. Guillermo	PFP	June 30, 2019	June 30, 2028
1st district	Martin M. Bulayo Sr.	NPC	June 30, 2025	June 30, 2028
1st district	Roseller A. Escobar	PFP	June 30, 2025	June 30, 2028
1st district				June 30, 2028
2nd district	Linda G. Dacmay	PFP	June 30, 2019	June 30, 2028
2nd district	Tomas L. Baccac	PFP	June 30, 2019	June 30, 2028
2nd district	Celso J. Albano	Independent	June 30, 2025	June 30, 2028
2nd district	Roy A. Saladino	PFP	June 30, 2022	June 30, 2028
2nd district	Alegre M. Ylanan	PFP	June 30, 2022	June 30, 2028
ABC	Rodrigo Delapena	Nonpartisan	July 30, 2018	January 1, 2023
PCL				June 30, 2028
SK	Juan Viktor Gamboa	Nonpartisan	June 8, 2018	January 1, 2023
IPMR	Martin Bulayo	Nonpartisan		

=== Vice governor ===
Election year	Name	Party	Ref.
2016	May Garnace-Calaunan	Liberal	
2019	Julius Caesar S. Vaquilar	PDP–Laban	
2022	Julius Caesar S. Vaquilar	PDP–Laban	
2025	Julius Caesar S. Vaquilar	PFP	
2026	Lilybeth H. Yogyog	Independent	

=== 1st district ===
- Population (2024):

Election year	Member (party)	Member (party)	Member (party)	Member (party)	Member (party)	Ref.
2016	Julius Caesar S. Vaquilar (Liberal)	Roldan E. Ubando (Liberal)	Willard V. Abuan (Liberal)	Jovino Navalta (Independent)	—N/a	
2019	Marlo S. Guillermo (PDP–Laban)	Jerry M. Pagbilao (PDP–Laban)	Babylyn G. Reyes (Independent)	Jovino Navalta (PDP–Laban)	—N/a	
2022	Marlo S. Guillermo (Nacionalista)	Marcelina M. Pagbilao (until 2024) (NPC)	Babylyn G. Reyes (PDP–Laban)	Jovino Navalta (Reporma)	—N/a	
2025	Marlo S. Guillermo (PFP)	Roseller A. Escobar (PFP)	Babylyn G. Reyes (PFP)	Martin M. Bulayo Sr. (NPC)	Lilybeth H. Yogyog (Independent)	

=== 2nd district ===
- Population (2024):

Election year	Member (party)	Member (party)	Member (party)	Member (party)	Member (party)	Ref.
2016	Tomas L. Baccac (Liberal)	Joel B. Badongen (Liberal)	Magdalena A. Saladino (Liberal)	Elizabeth B. Saure (Independent)	—N/a	
2019	Tomas L. Baccac (PDP–Laban)	Linda G. Dacmay (PDP–Laban)	Magdalena A. Saladino (PDP–Laban)	Elizabeth B. Saure (PDP–Laban)	—N/a	
2022	Roy A. Saladino (Independent)	Linda G. Dacmay (PDP–Laban)	Alegre M. Ylanan (Liberal)	Elizabeth B. Saure (Nacionalista)	—N/a	
2025	Roy A. Saladino (PFP)	Linda G. Dacmay (PFP)	Alegre M. Ylanan (PFP)	Tomas L. Baccac Sr. (PF)	Celso J. Albano (Independent)	
