= Governor of Southern Leyte =

Local chief executive

- Gobernador sa Habagatang Leyte; Gobernador han Salatan nga Leyte
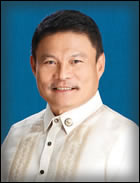
- Incumbent; Damian Gaviola Mercado since June 30, 2016
- Style: The Honorable
- Seat: Southern Leyte Provincial Capitol, Maasin
- Term length: 3 years, renewable maximum not eligible for re-election immediately after three consecutive terms
- Inaugural holder: Alfredo Kangleon Bantug Sr.
- Formation: June 1, 1960
- Deputy: Vice Governor
- Website: https://southernleyte.gov.ph/

The governor of Southern Leyte is the local chief executive and head of the Provincial Government of Southern Leyte in the Philippines. Along with the governors of Biliran, Eastern Samar, Leyte, Northern Samar, and Samar, the province's chief executive is a member of the Regional Development Council of the Eastern Visayas Region.

== List of governors of Southern Leyte ==
Governors of Southern Leyte

1. THIRD PHILIPPINE REPUBLIC (1960–1981)
No.	Image	Name	Term	Origin	Note(s)
1		Alfredo Kangleon Bantug Sr.	July 1, 1960 - December 31, 1963	Maasin	Former mayor of Maasin. Appointed governor by President Carlos P. Garcia.
1		Alfredo Kangleon Bantug Sr.	January 1, 1964 - December 31, 1967	Maasin	Elected.
2		Salvacion Oppus Yñiguez	January 1, 1968 - June 30, 1981	Maasin	Elected twice.

2. FOURTH PHILIPPINE REPUBLIC (1981–1986)
No.	Image	Name	Term	Origin	Note(s)
—		Salvacion Oppus Yñiguez	June 30, 1981 - March 15, 1986	Maasin	Elected.

3. FIFTH PHILIPPINE REPUBLIC (1986–present)
No.	Image	Name	Term	Origin	Note(s)
3		Oscar Tan	March 16, 1986 - June 30, 1987	Sogod	Appointed by President Corazon C. Aquino.
3		Oscar Tan	June 30, 1987 - June 30, 1998	Sogod	Elected in 3 consecutive terms
4		Rosette Yñiguez Lerias	June 30, 1998 - June 30, 2007	Maasin	Elected in 3 consecutive terms
5		Damian Gaviola Mercado	June 30, 2007 - June 30, 2013	Maasin	Elected twice.
6		Roger Gaviola Mercado	June 30, 2013 - June 30, 2016	Maasin	Elected.
—		Damian Gaviola Mercado	June 30, 2016 - present	Maasin	Elected in 3 consecutive terms.
—		Christopherson Yap	August 10, 2017 - October 31, 2018	Sogod	Acting governor
