= Governor of Quirino =

Local chief executive

- Gobernador ng Lalawigan ng Quirino
- Incumbent; Julius Caesar Vaquilar since September 15, 2026
- Style: The Honorable
- Seat: Quirino Provincial Capitol, Cabarroguis
- Term length: 3 years, renewable maximum not eligible for re-election immediately after three consecutive terms
- Inaugural holder: Jose B. Aquino (de facto, as Lt. Governor of Quirino); Dionisio A. Sarandi (de jure, first elected Provincial Governor)
- Formation: February 10, 1972
- Deputy: Vice Governor

The governor of Quirino is the local chief executive and head of the Provincial Government of Quirino in the Philippines. Along with the governors of Batanes, Cagayan, Isabela, Nueva Vizcaya, the province's chief executive is a member of the Regional Development Council of the Cagayan Valley Region.

== History ==
On June 18, 1966, through Republic Act No. 4734, the subprovince of Quirino was created from Nueva Vizcaya. Subsequently, On November 14, 1967, Jose B. Aquino was elected first Lieutenant governor of subprovince reporting under the civil governor of Nueva Vizcaya. He officially started his office on January 1, 1968.

On September 17, 1971, Quirino became an independent province through Republic Act No. 6394. Subsequently, the first provincial election was held on November 8, 1971.

== List of governors of Quirino ==
Governors of Quirino

1. LIEUTENANT GOVERNOR (1966–1972)
No.	Image	Name	Term	Origin	Note(s)
1		Jose B. Aquino	January 1, 1968 - September 17, 1971	—	first elected Lieutenant-Governor of subprovince.
1		Jose B. Aquino	September 17, 1971 - February 10, 1972	—	designation was changed to Governor upon the establishment of province of Quirino

2. THIRD PHILIPPINE REPUBLIC (1972–1980)
No.	Image	Name	Term	Origin	Note(s)
1		Dionisio A. Sarandi	February 10, 1972 - June 30, 1980	Maddela	first elected governor.

3. FOURTH PHILIPPINE REPUBLIC (1978–1986)
No.	Image	Name	Term	Origin	Note(s)
2		Orlando C. Dulay	June 30, 1980 - June 30, 1984	Cabarroguis	Elected.
3		George Gatchalian	June 30, 1984 - March 15, 1986	—	Acting governor when Gov. Dulay was elected assemblyman.

4. FIFTH PHILIPPINE REPUBLIC (1986–present)
No.	Image	Name	Term	Origin	Note(s)
4		Renicolas Delizo	March 16, 1986 - June 30, 1988	—	Appointed by President Corazon C. Aquino.
5		Mariano J. Pimentel	June 30, 1988 - June 30, 1992	Diffun	Elected.
6		Pedro Ladia Bacani	June 30, 1992 - June 30, 1998	Maddela	Elected twice.
7		Josie Castillo-Co	June 30, 1998 - June 30, 2001	Cabarroguis	Elected.
—		Pedro Ladia Bacani	June 30, 2001 - June 30, 2007	Maddela	Elected twice.
8		Dakila Carlo Enriquez Cua	June 30, 2007 - June 30, 2010	Maddela	Elected.
9		Junie Evangelista Cua	June 30, 2010 - June 30, 2019	Maddela	Elected in 3 consecutive terms.
—		Dakila Carlo Enriquez Cua	June 30, 2019 - September 15, 2026	Maddela	Elected twice. Died in office.
10		Julius Caesar Vaquilar	September 15, 2026 - present	Diffun	Assumed office upon Cua's death.
