= Dakila Cua =

Filipino politician (1977–2026)

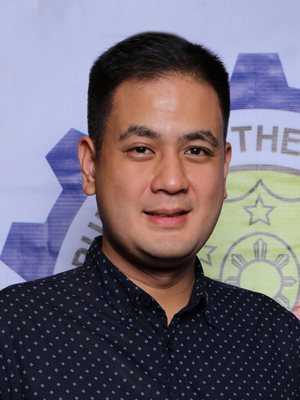
- Cua in 2019

8th Governor of Quirino
- In office June 30, 2019 – September 15, 2026
- Vice Governor: Julius Caesar Vaquilar
- Preceded by: Junie Cua
- Succeeded by: Julius Caesar Vaquilar
- In office June 30, 2007 – June 30, 2010
- Vice Governor: Pasencia Bacani
- Preceded by: Pedro Bacani
- Succeeded by: Junie Cua

Vice Governor of Quirino
- In office June 30, 2001 – June 30, 2007
- Governor: Pedro Bacani
- Succeeded by: Pasencia Bacani

Member of Philippine House of Representatives from Quirino's at-large district
- In office June 30, 2010 – June 30, 2019
- Preceded by: Junie Cua
- Succeeded by: Junie Cua

Personal details
- Born: Dakila Carlo Enriquez Cua; November 4, 1977 Quezon City, Philippines
- Died: September 15, 2026 (aged 48) Manila, Philippines
- Resting place: Manila Memorial Park – Sucat, Parañaque
- Party: PFP (2023–2026)
- Other political affiliations: PDDS (2021–2023); PDP–Laban (2016–2021); Liberal (2004–2007; 2010–2016); Lakas (2007–2010); LDP (2001–2004)
- Spouse: Midy Nacague (m. 2011)
- Children: 3
- Education: University of the Philippines Diliman (BSBA)

Dakila Carlo "Dax" Enriquez Cua (November 4, 1977 – September 15, 2026) was a Filipino politician who served as the governor of Quirino from 2019 until his death on September 15, 2026, a position he previously held from 2007 to 2010. He served as representative for the Lone District of Quirino in the House of Representatives of the Philippines from 2010 to 2019. He also served as vice governor of Quirino from 2001 to 2007.

== Early life and education ==
Dakila Carlo Enriquez Cua was born in Quezon City on November 4, 1977. He was the third among the five children of Junie Cua and Maria Angela Enriquez.

He finished elementary and secondary education at Xavier School in Greenhills, San Juan. He graduated from the University of the Philippines with a degree in business administration.

== Political career ==
=== Early years ===
Cua started his political career at the age of 23. In 2001, he was elected as Vice Governor of Quirino becoming the youngest vice governor of the country at that time. In 2004, he was reelected to a second term. His flagship program was the Movement for the Integrated Development of the Youth (MIDY).

=== Governor of Quirino (2007–2010) ===
In 2007, he was elected Governor of Quirino. Among his flagship programs were I Love Quirino, a tourism and moral recovery program, and Q LIFE or Quirino Livelihood for Everyone, a comprehensive livelihood assistance program.

=== House of Representatives (2010–2019) ===
In 2010, Cua was elected as Representative of the Lone District of Quirino. In Congress, he served as chairman of the House Committees on Ecology, and Ways and Means as well as senior vice chairperson of the House Committees on Appropriations, Economic Affairs and Constitutional Amendments. He also served as a Member for the Majority on Energy, Information and Communications Technology. He was the principal author of the TRAIN Law, and co-author of the Rice Tarrification Law, the Ease of Doing Business Act and the Philippine Competition Law. He was also the principal author of RA 10230, which established Quirino State University (QSU) by integrating the Quirino State College (QSC), the Quirino Polytechnic College (QPC), and the Maddela Institute of Technology (MIT).

=== Governor of Quirino (2019–2026) ===
Cua was elected as Governor of Quirino again in the 2019 election, succeeding his father Junie Cua who held the post from 2010. After Cua died in office on September 15, 2026, his Vice Governor Julius Caesar Vaquilar was sworn in as the new executive head of the province two days later.

== Personal life ==
Dax Cua was part of a political family. His father, Junie Cua, served as Governor of Quirino from 2010 to 2019 and previously served as its Representative from 1988 to 1998 and from 2001 to 2010. His mother, Maria Angela Enriquez, served as Representative from 1998 to 2001.

In 2011, he married Midy Nacague, who has been the incumbent representative of Quirino since 2022. They had three children.

Cua also made a cameo role in the 2007 television series Marimar.

== Death ==
Cua died at the age of 48 on September 15, 2026, in Manila. His father Junie Cua and brother Junie Isagani Cua Jr. later disclosed that he died due to lung cancer, an illness he was diagnosed with in 2024. His wake was held at the Quirino Capitol People's Gymnasium in Cabarroguis from September 17 to 20, followed by a necrological service at the Batasang Pambansa Complex on September 21 and another wake at the Heritage Memorial Park in Taguig from September 21 to 24. His remains were buried at the Manila Memorial Park – Sucat on September 25.

Political offices
Preceded by Pedro Bacani	Governor of Quirino; 2007–2010	Succeeded by Junie Cua
Preceded by Junie Cua	Governor of Quirino; 2019–2026	Succeeded by Julius Caesar Vaquilar
House of Representatives of the Philippines
Preceded by Junie Cua	Member of the House of Representatives from Quirino's at-large district 2010–2019	Succeeded by Junie Cua
