= Julius Caesar Vaquilar =

Filipino politician

10th Governor of Quirino
- Incumbent
- Assumed office September 15, 2026
- Vice Governor: Lilybeth H. Yogyog
- Preceded by: Dakila Cua

Vice Governor of Quirino
- In office June 30, 2019 – September 15, 2026
- Governor: Dakila Cua
- Preceded by: May Garnace-Calaunan
- Succeeded by: Lilybeth H. Yogyog

Personal details
- Born: Julius Caesar S. Vaquilar
- Party: Partido Federal ng Pilipinas
- Occupation: Politician

Julius Caesar S. Vaquilar is a Filipino politician who has served as the governor of Quirino since 2026. He assumed office following the death of Dakila Cua.

== See also ==
- List of current Philippine governors
