= Cabarroguis =

Capital of Quirino, Philippines

- Municipality
- Municipality of Cabarroguis
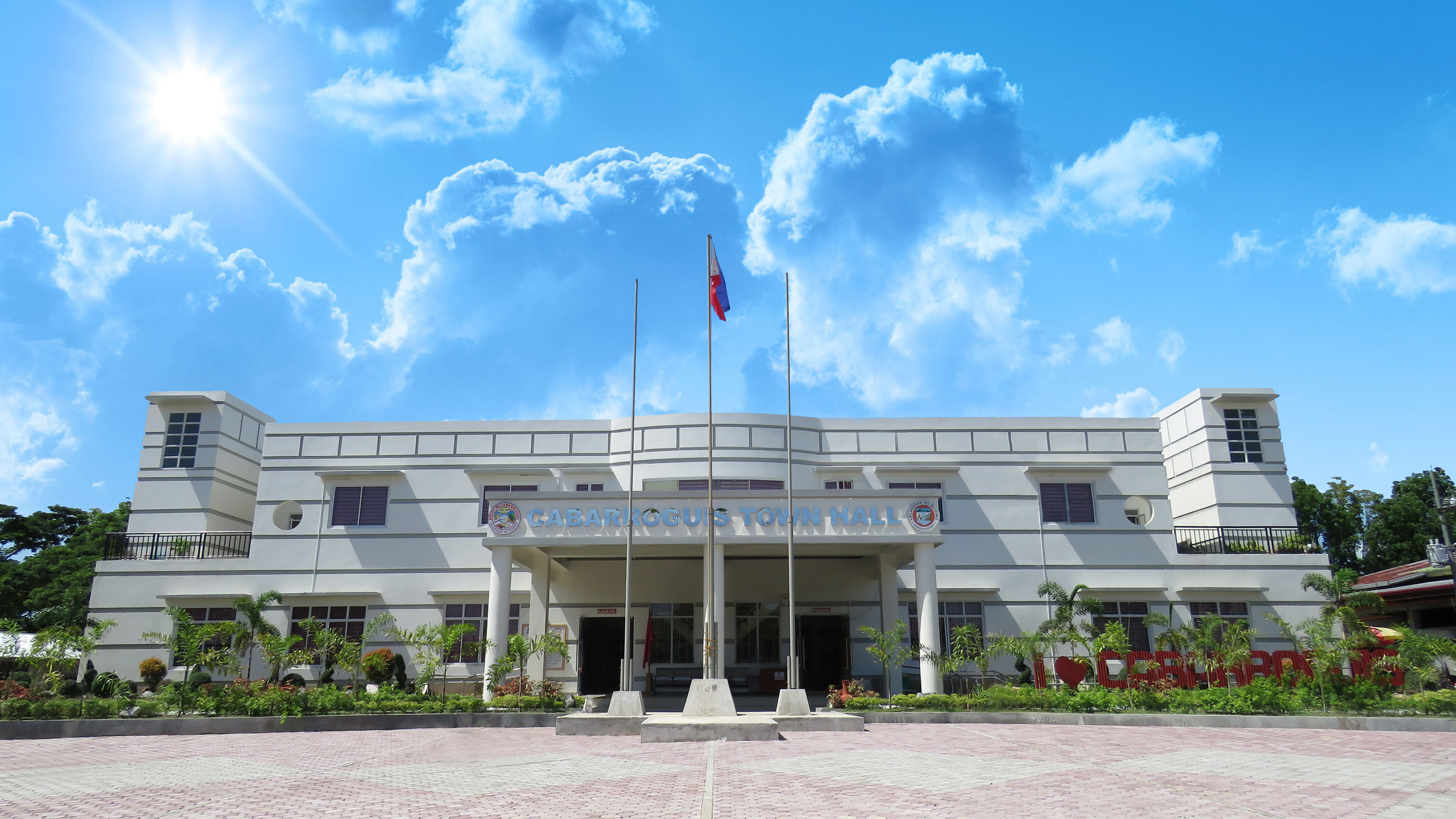
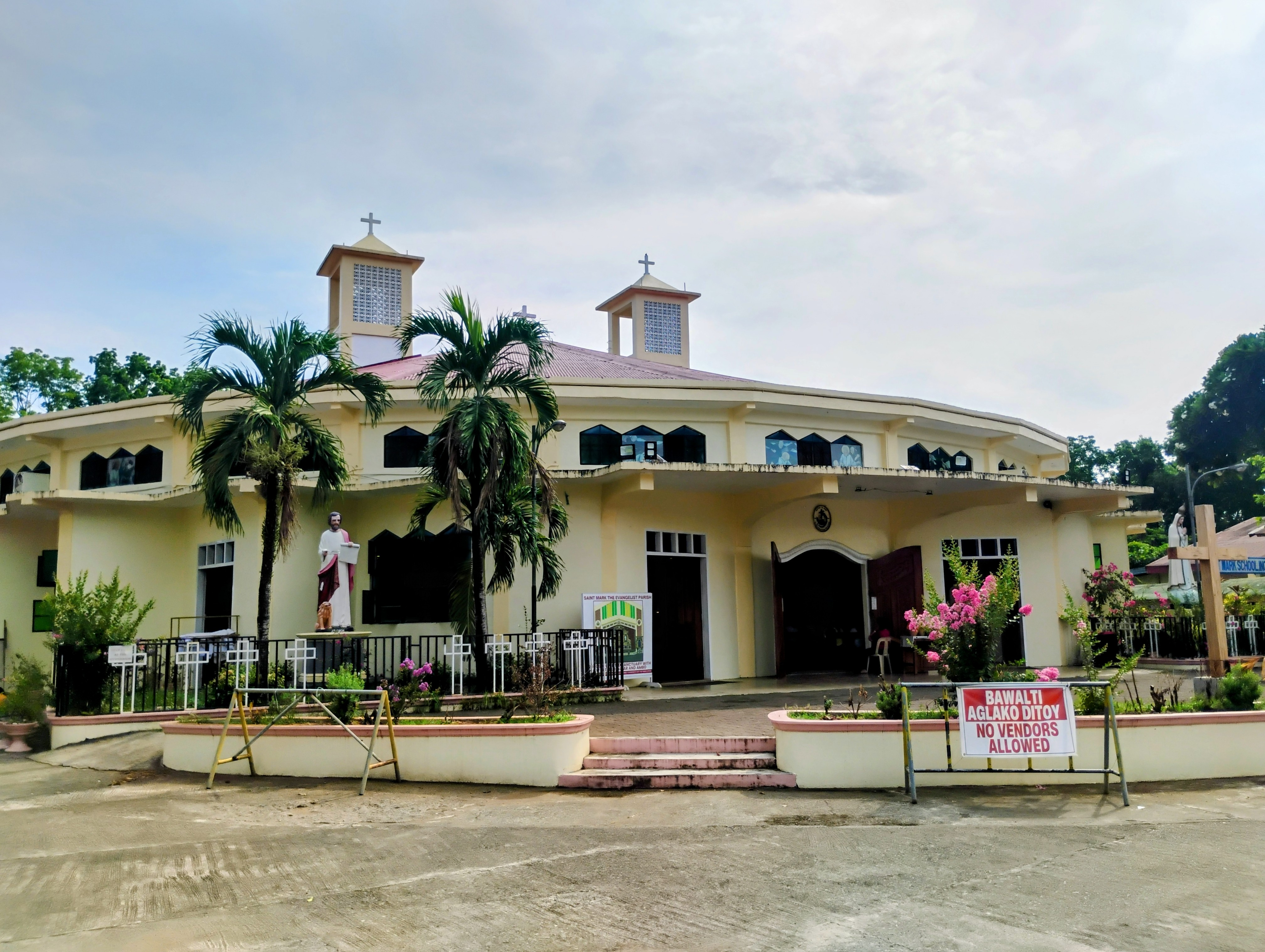
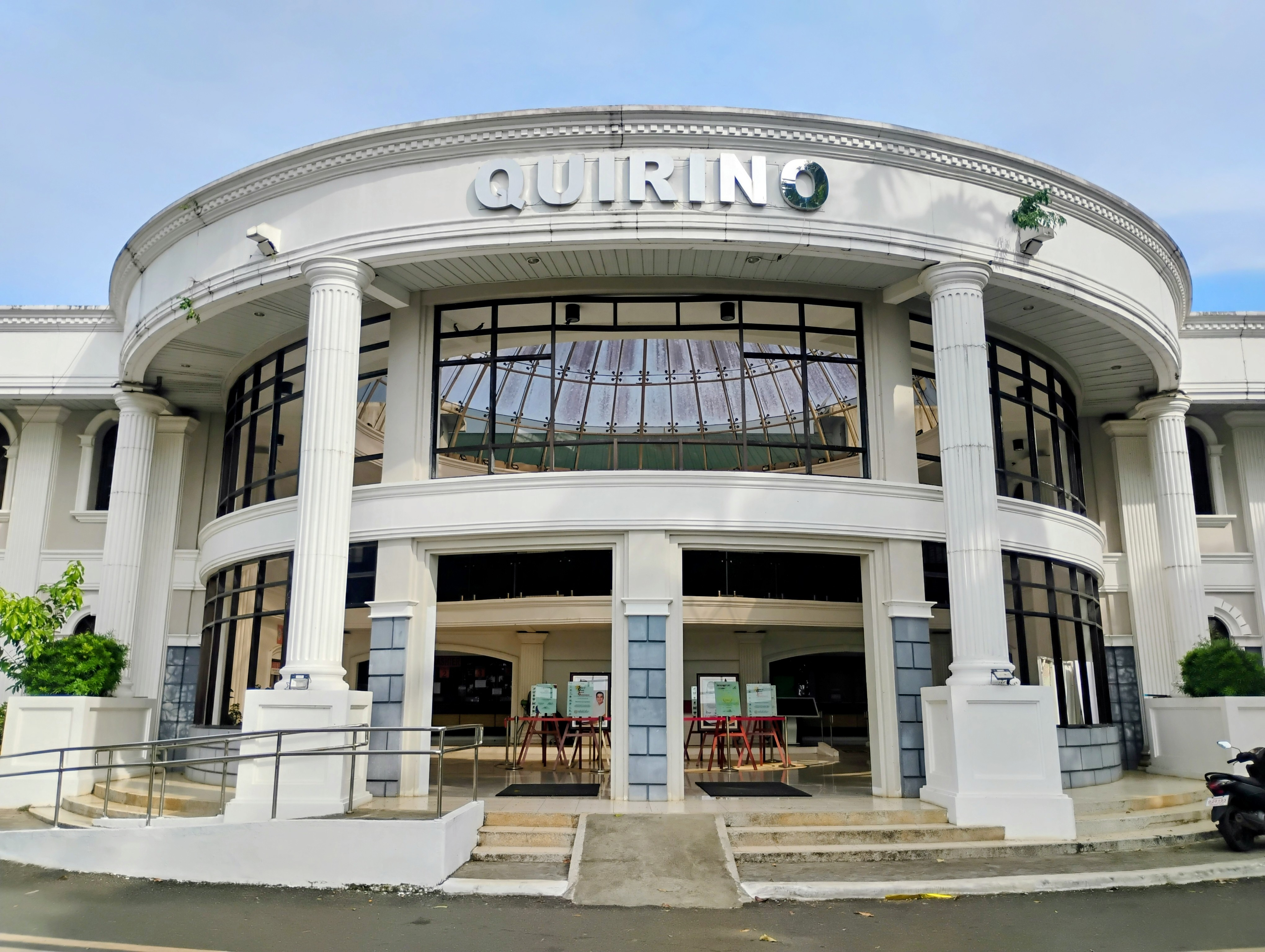
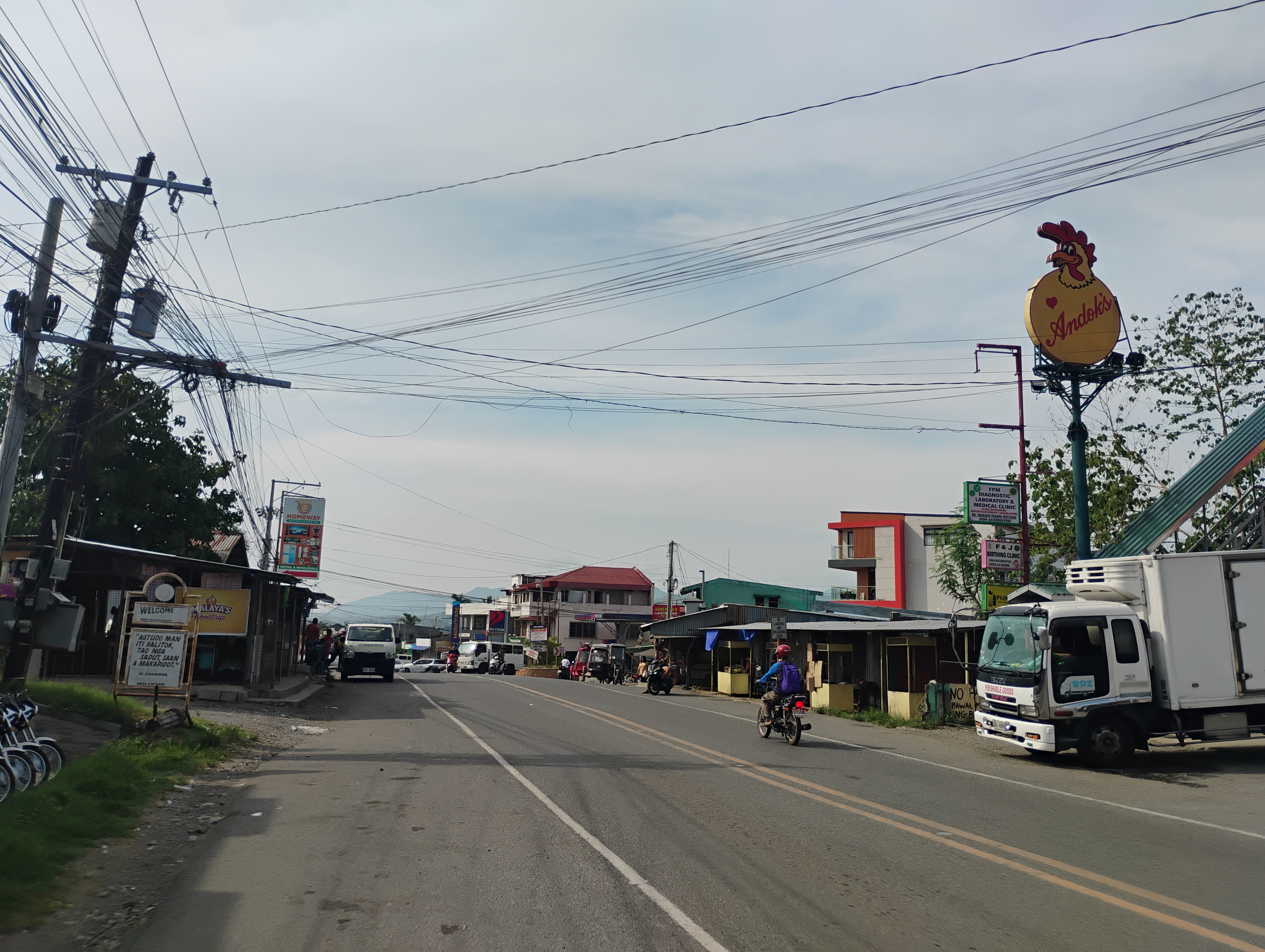
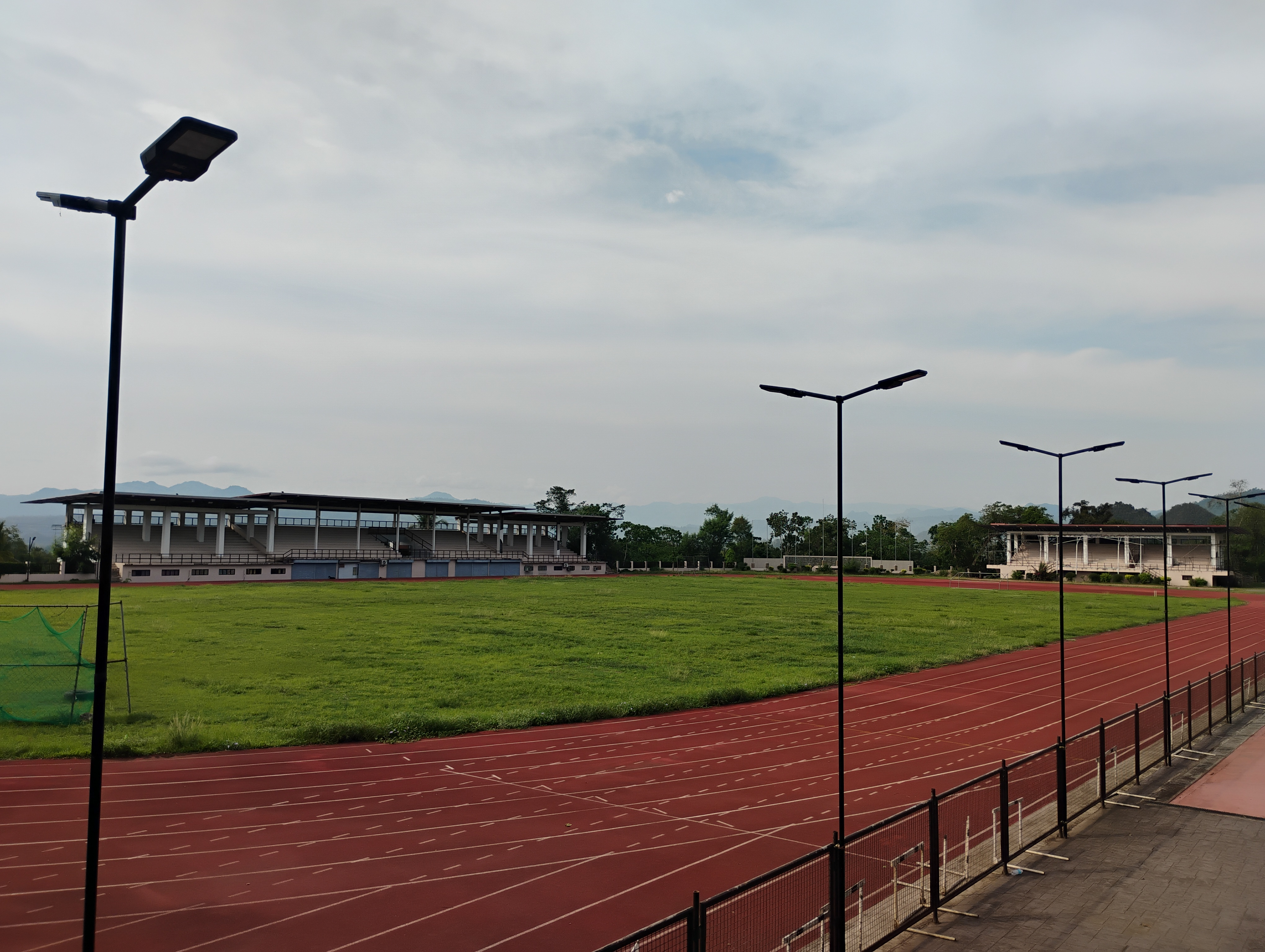
- Cabarroguis Town Hall Saint Mark the Evangelist Parish Church Quirino Provincial Capitol Cabarroguis Town Proper Quirino Sports Tourism Complex

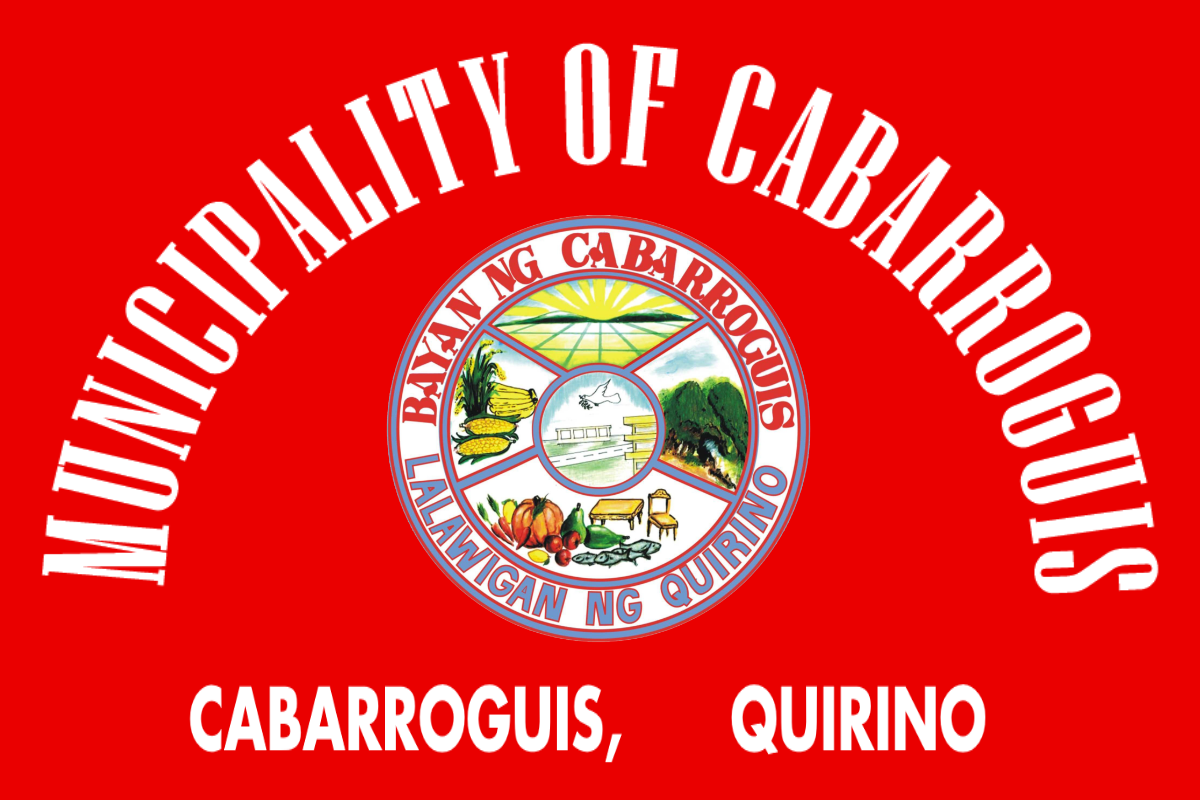
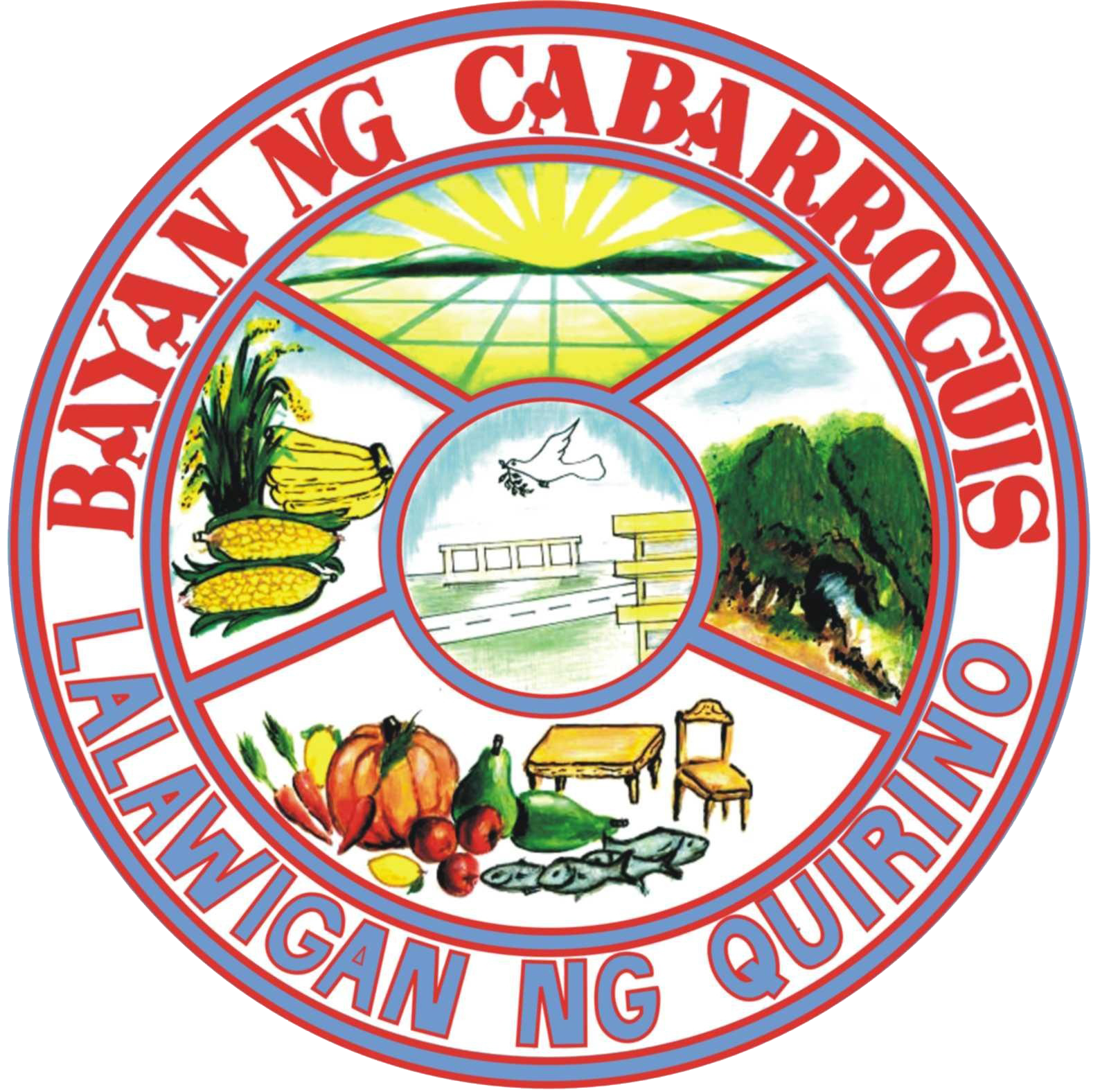
- Flag Seal

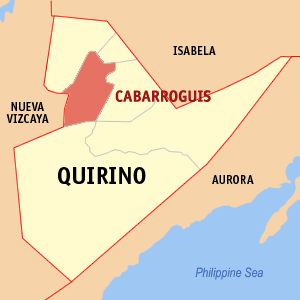
- Map of Quirino with Cabarroguis highlighted
- Interactive map of Cabarroguis
- Location within the Philippines
- Coordinates: 16°30′37″N 121°31′20″E
- Country: Philippines
- Region: Cagayan Valley
- Province: Quirino
- District: Lone district
- Founded: June 21, 1969
- Named for: Leon Cabarroguis
- Barangays: 17 (see Barangays)

Government
  - Type: Sangguniang Bayan
  - Mayor: Avelino Noveda Agustin, Jr.
  - Vice Mayor: Francisco M. Dulnuan, Jr.
  - Representative: Midy Cua
  - Municipal Council: Members: Jann Graceal Bert N. Binlayan; Avelino N. Agustin Jr.; Francisco M. Dulnuan Jr.; Teresita B. Tuguinayo; Tirso V. Abuan; Alipio N. Pastor; Danuel S. Galgaleng; Florencio L. Valdez Jr.
  - Electorate: 21,631 voters (2025)

Area
  - Total: 260.20 km^{2} (100.46 sq mi)
- Elevation: 112 m (367 ft)
- Highest elevation: 534 m (1,752 ft)
- Lowest elevation: 95 m (312 ft)

Population (2024 census)
  - Total: 34,720
  - Density: 133.4/km^{2} (345.6/sq mi)
  - Households: 7,966

Economy
  - Income class: 1st municipal income class
  - Poverty incidence: 6.99% (2023)
  - Revenue: ₱ 353 million (2024)
  - Assets: ₱ 554.9 million (2024)
  - Expenditure: ₱ 302.3 million (2024)
  - Liabilities: ₱ 84.48 million (2024)

Service provider
  - Electricity: Quirino Electric Cooperative (QUIRELCO)
- Time zone: UTC+8 (PST)
- ZIP code: 3400
- PSGC: 0205702000
- IDD : area code: +63 (0)78
- Native languages: Ilocano; Bugkalot; Tagalog
- Website: www.cabarroguis.gov.ph

Cabarroguis, officially the Municipality of Cabarroguis (Ilocano: Ili ti Cabarroguis; Tagalog: Bayan ng Cabarroguis), is a municipality and capital of the province of Quirino, Philippines. According to the 2024 census, it has a population of 34,720 people.

== History ==
Saint Mark Parish Church (Cabarroguis, Quirino)

Prior to the advent of settlement, Cabarroguis was a vast forested area and formed parts of the municipalities of Saguday, Diffun, and Aglipay. It was originally occupied by the Aetas who were later displaced by the Ilongot tribe because the Aetas were known to be of nomadic character. Many years later, permanent settlements were made by different civilized ethnic groups like Ilocanos, Tagalog and others in search of good fortune in this virgin land.

As the population and settlement increased, regular barrios were created. These were the barrios of Zamora, Banuar, Burgos, Del Pilar, Dibibi, Eden, Villamor and five more sitios of Villapeña, Villarose, Tucod, Calaocan and Dingasan at the municipality of Aglipay: barrios of San Marcos, Gundaway and portion of Mangandingay at the municipality of Diffun and the other part of Mangandingay at the municipality of Saguday. The above stated barrios of different municipalities became the territorial jurisdiction of Cabarroguis by virtue of Republic Act No. 5554 enacted by the Philippine Congress authored by then Senator Leonardo Perez on June 21, 1969. The newly created municipality of Cabarroguis was named in honor of the late Congressman of Nueva Vizcaya, Leon Cabarroguis.

Cabarroguis operated as a regular municipality after the 1971 local polls wherein Anastacio dela Pena become the first Local Chief Executive. Barangay Mangandingay also became the temporary seat of the municipal government, Years later, when Diomedes Dumayas was appointed as the town's executive, the seat of the Local Government officially transferred to Barangay Zamora, where a 12-hectare (30-acre) lot was donated.

== Geography ==
Cabarroguis is located in the northwestern part of the province of Quirino. It is bounded to the north, northwest, and northeast by the municipalities of Diffun, and Saguday, respectively; to the east and southeast by the municipality of Aglipay; to the south by the municipalities of Maddela and Nagtipunan; and, to the west by the province of Nueva Vizcaya.

The municipal area of Cabarroguis covers 26,902 hectares (66,480 acres), approximately. The area is further distributed into the 17 barangays comprising the municipality, including barangay Didipio, which remains in the municipality and the provinces of Nueva Vizcaya, and Quirino.

Cabarroguis is accessible by series of roads notably the Cordon–Diffun–Maddela–Aurora Road. It is situated 370.87 kilometres (230.45 mi) from the country's capital city of Manila.

=== Barangays ===
Cabarroguis is politically subdivided into 17 barangays. Each barangay consists of puroks and some have sitios.

Names of Barangays with the corresponding Land Areas, Households & Population Source: 2022 Community-Based Monitoring System (CBMS), Philippine Statistics Authority
Barangay	Land Area (has.)	Number of responding households	Number of household members
Urban:			
Gundaway	629.6612	1011	4072
Zamora	427.1250	734	2779
Mangandingay	500.7266	915	3584
San Marcos	667.7311	671	2496
Sub-total:	2,255.2439	3331	12931
Rural:			
Villarose	843.1654	195	779
Banuar	546.6502	180	712
Villamor	865.3353	630	2449
Del Pilar	550.1530	176	593
Villa Peña	642.1622	199	727
Burgos	1,288.4090	823	3171
Eden	1,001.8760	289	1131
Gomez	491.8008	162	627
Dingasan	3,108.0650	396	1663
Calaocan	677.9979	223	935
Dibibi	3,491.2367	690	2776
Sto. Domingo	299.6062	239	863
Tucod (including Didipio)	10,869.8230	455	1963
Sub-total:	24,646.7561	4657	18389
Total:	26,902	7988	31320

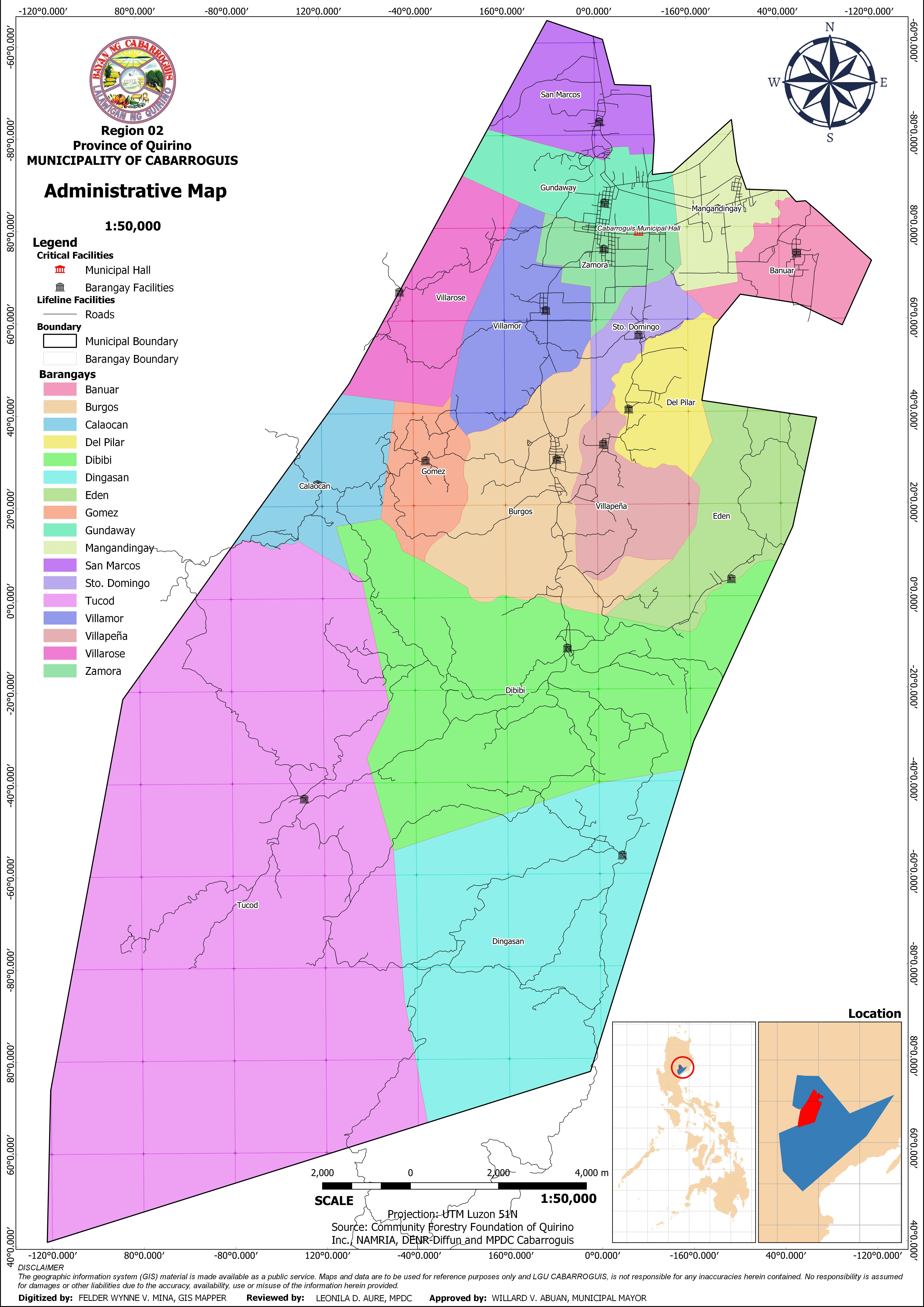
Administrative Map

=== Climate ===
Climate data for Cabarroguis, Quirino
Month	Jan	Feb	Mar	Apr	May	Jun	Jul	Aug	Sep	Oct	Nov	Dec	Year
Mean daily maximum °C (°F)	25 (77)	26 (79)	28 (82)	32 (90)	31 (88)	31 (88)	30 (86)	30 (86)	30 (86)	29 (84)	27 (81)	25 (77)	29 (84)
Mean daily minimum °C (°F)	19 (66)	20 (68)	21 (70)	22 (72)	24 (75)	24 (75)	24 (75)	24 (75)	23 (73)	23 (73)	22 (72)	20 (68)	22 (72)
Average precipitation mm (inches)	119 (4.7)	83 (3.3)	54 (2.1)	37 (1.5)	133 (5.2)	132 (5.2)	161 (6.3)	163 (6.4)	153 (6.0)	142 (5.6)	160 (6.3)	224 (8.8)	1,561 (61.4)
Average rainy days	18.4	13.6	11.6	9.4	19.3	21.9	23.9	23.4	21.1	16.3	18.1	21.4	218.4
Source: Meteoblue

== Demographics ==
Population census of Cabarroguis

Year	Pop.	±% p.a.
1970	7,838	—
1975	12,226	+9.33%
1980	17,450	+7.37%
1990	21,793	+2.25%
1995	22,812	+0.86%
2000	25,832	+2.70%

Year	Pop.	±% p.a.
2007	28,024	+1.13%
2010	29,395	+1.75%
2015	30,582	+0.76%
2020	33,533	+1.96%
2024	34,720	+0.84%

Source: Philippine Statistics Authority

Initially, year 1970 recorded a population of 7,835 person followed by census year 1975 which registered a total population of 12,226 that manifested a growth rate of 9.29%. Another increase of population was observed during census year 1980 which recorded 17,450 displaying a growth rate of 2.2% and for census year 1995, it manifested a 22,812 person displaying a growth rate of 2.25%. Base year of 2000 recorded a total population of 25,832 which manifested a growth rate of 2.25%. As of census year 2024, the population increased to 34,720 which manifested a growth rate of 0.84%.

== Economy ==
Poverty incidence of Cabarroguis (%)

Source: Philippine Statistics Authority

=== Income class ===
Cabarroguis is a municipality with an agricultural base economy where the majority of the population derives their income from agricultural related industries and businesses. The municipality is 99% dependent on the Internal Revenue Allotment (IRA) now called the National Tax Allocation (NTA).

For the year 2022, the local lncome is Four Million Five Hundred Ninety-One Three Hundred forty-seven and 92/100 (4,591,347.92) and the total external income is Two Hundred Ten Million Five Hundred Eighty-seven Fifty-three thousand (210,587,053.00).

== Government ==
=== Local government ===
Cabarroguis is part of the lone congressional district of the province of Quirino. It is governed by a mayor, designated as its local chief executive, and by a municipal council as its legislative body in accordance with the Local Government Code. The mayor, vice mayor, and the municipal councilors are elected directly in polls held every three years.

=== Elected officials ===
Members of the Municipal Council (2022–2025)
Position	Name
Congressman	Midy N. Cua
Municipal Mayor	Avelino N. Agustin Jr.
Vice-Mayor	Francisco M. Dulnuan, Jr.
Councilors	Jann Graceal Bert N. Binlayan
Councilors	Danuel S. Galgaleng
Councilors	Virgilio A. Lopez
Councilors	Marciano G. Immapa
Councilors	Tirso V. Abuan
Councilors	Zernan B. Cariño
Councilors	Florencio L. Valdez Jr.
Councilors	Leilani R. Vinluan
Councilors	David G. Bangsoyao
Councilors	Reynaldo S. Marzo
Councilors	Jannette R. Orpia

== Education ==
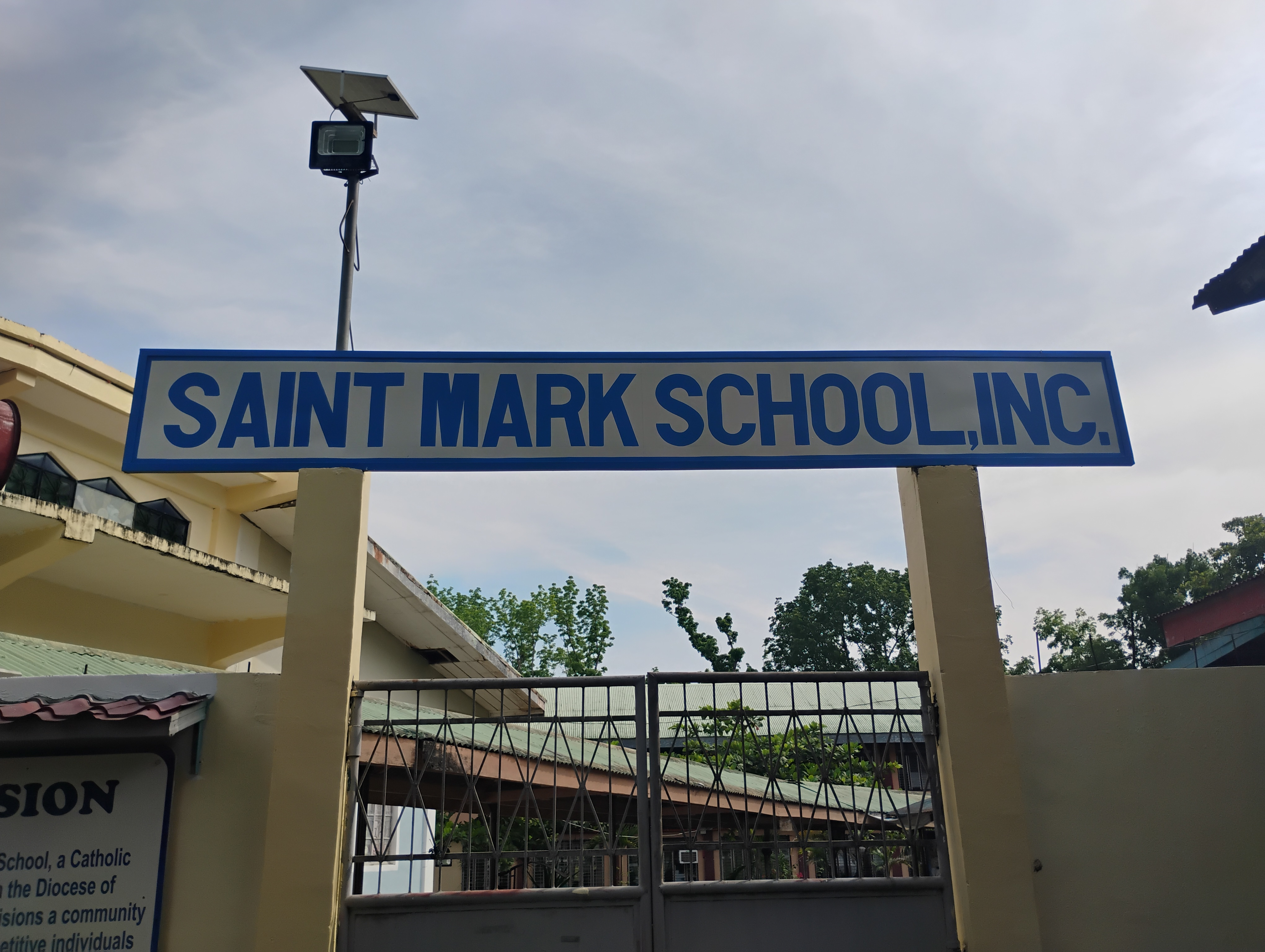
Saint Mark School, Inc.

The Schools Division of Quirino governs the town's public education system. The division office is a field office of the DepEd in Cagayan Valley region. The Cabarroguis Schools District Office governs the public and private elementary and high schools throughout the municipality.

=== Primary and elementary schools ===
- Ambuklao Elementary School
- Banuar Elementary School
- Burgos Elementary School
- Cabarroguis Central School - Integrated SPED Center
- Cabarroguis Faith Academy
- Calaocan Integrated School (Elementary)
- Del Pilar Elementary School
- Dibibi Integrated School
- Dingasan Integrated School (Elementary)
- Eden Integrated School (Elementary)
- Gen. Luna Elementary School
- Gomez Elementary School
- Loacan Elementary School
- Mangandingay Elementary School
- Potia Elementary School
- Pukeg Elementary School
- Quirino Central Learning Center
- San Marcos Elementary School
- Sto. Domingo Elementary School
- Tucod Elementary School
- Upper Dibibi Elementary School
- Upper Dingasan Elementary School
- Villa Peña Elementary School
- Villamor Elementary School
- Villarose Integrated School
- Waterfalls Elementary School
- Zamora Elementary School

=== Secondary schools ===
- Burgos National High School
- Cabarroguis Central School - Integrated SPED Cente
- Cabarroguis National School of Arts and Trades
- Dibibi Integrated School
- Dingasan Integrated School
- Eden Integrated School
- Quirino General High School
- St. Mark's School
- Villarose Integrated School

=== Higher educational institution ===
- Quirino State University
