= Leyte's 4th congressional district =

House of Representatives of the Philippines legislative district

- Constituency for the House of Representatives of the Philippines
- Boundary of Leyte's 4th congressional district in Leyte
- Location of Leyte within the Philippines
- Province: Leyte
- Region: Eastern Visayas
- Population: 492,035 (2020)
- Electorate: 325,491 (2022)
- Major settlements: 7 LGUs: Cities; Ormoc; Municipalities; Albuera; Isabel; Kananga; Matag-ob; Merida; Palompon
- Area: 1,450.84 km^{2} (560.17 sq mi)

Current constituency
- Created: 1907
- Representative: Richard Gomez
- Political party: PFP
- Congressional bloc: Majority

Leyte's 4th congressional district is one of the five congressional districts of the Philippines in the province of Leyte. It has been represented in the House of Representatives of the Philippines since 1916 and earlier in the Philippine Assembly from 1907 to 1916. The district consists of the city of Ormoc and adjacent municipalities of Albuera, Isabel, Kananga, Matag-ob, Merida and Palompon since 1987. It is currently represented in the 19th Congress by Richard Gomez of the Partido Federal ng Pilipinas (PFP).

Until 1931, the district consisted of the northeastern municipalities of Alangalang, Babatngon, Dulag, Palo, San Miguel, Tacloban, Tanauan, and Tolosa. Following the creation of the fifth district where Alangalang was added, the municipalities of Abuyog and Santa Fe were reapportioned into this district. MacArthur, Mahaplag, and Mayorga were later established after the district's re-creation in 1945. Following the creation of Southern Leyte in 1959, these areas under this district were reapportioned to the first district, and the district was redefined to consist of the city of Ormoc and the western municipalities of Albuera, Bato, Baybay, Hilongos, Hindang, Inopacan, Kananga, and Matalom, all previously from the second district, from 1961 until its second dissolution in 1972.

== Representation history ==
#	Image	Member	Term of office		Legislature	Party	Electoral history	Constituent LGUs
#	Image	Member	Start	End	Legislature	Party	Electoral history	Constituent LGUs
=== Leyte's 4th district for the Philippine Assembly ===
District created January 9, 1907.
1		Jaime C. de Veyra	October 16, 1907	October 16, 1912	1st	Nacionalista	Elected in 1907.	1907–1909; Alangalang, Babatngon, Dulag, Palo, Tacloban, Tanauan, Tolosa
1		Jaime C. de Veyra	October 16, 1907	October 16, 1912	2nd	Nacionalista	Re-elected in 1909.	1909–1916; Alangalang, Babatngon, Dulag, Palo, San Miguel, Tacloban, Tanauan, Tolosa
2		Francisco Enage	October 16, 1912	February 5, 1915	3rd	Nacionalista	Elected in 1912. Resigned on appointment as Iloilo provincial prosecutor.	1909–1916; Alangalang, Babatngon, Dulag, Palo, San Miguel, Tacloban, Tanauan, Tolosa
3		Ruperto Kapunan	September 18, 1915	October 16, 1916	3rd	Progresista	Elected in 1915 to finish Enage's term.	1909–1916; Alangalang, Babatngon, Dulag, Palo, San Miguel, Tacloban, Tanauan, Tolosa
=== Leyte's 4th district for the House of Representatives of the Philippine Islands ===
(3)		Ruperto Kapunan	October 16, 1916	June 6, 1922	4th	Progresista	Re-elected in 1916.	1916–1931; Alangalang, Babatngon, Dulag, Palo, San Miguel, Tacloban, Tanauan, Tolosa
(3)		Ruperto Kapunan	October 16, 1916	June 6, 1922	5th	Nacionalista	Re-elected in 1919.	1916–1931; Alangalang, Babatngon, Dulag, Palo, San Miguel, Tacloban, Tanauan, Tolosa
4		Filomeno Montejo	June 6, 1922	June 5, 1928	6th	Nacionalista; Colectivista	Elected in 1922.	1916–1931; Alangalang, Babatngon, Dulag, Palo, San Miguel, Tacloban, Tanauan, Tolosa
4		Filomeno Montejo	June 6, 1922	June 5, 1928	7th	Nacionalista; Consolidado	Re-elected in 1925.	1916–1931; Alangalang, Babatngon, Dulag, Palo, San Miguel, Tacloban, Tanauan, Tolosa
5		Cirilo Bayaya	June 5, 1928	June 5, 1934	8th	Nacionalista; Consolidado	Elected in 1928.	1916–1931; Alangalang, Babatngon, Dulag, Palo, San Miguel, Tacloban, Tanauan, Tolosa
5		Cirilo Bayaya	June 5, 1928	June 5, 1934	9th	Nacionalista; Consolidado	Re-elected in 1931.	1931–1935; Abuyog, Babatngon, Dulag, Palo, San Miguel, Tacloban, Tanauan, Tolosa
6		Fortunato M. Sevilla	June 5, 1934	September 16, 1935	10th	Nacionalista; Democrático	Elected in 1934.	1931–1935; Abuyog, Babatngon, Dulag, Palo, San Miguel, Tacloban, Tanauan, Tolosa
#	Image	Member	Term of office		National Assembly	Party	Electoral history	Constituent LGUs
#	Image	Member	Start	End	National Assembly	Party	Electoral history	Constituent LGUs
=== Leyte's 4th district for the National Assembly (Commonwealth of the Philippines) ===
(2)		Francisco Enage	September 16, 1935	September 1, 1936	1st	Nacionalista; Democrático	Elected in 1935. Resigned on appointment as presidential technical adviser.	1935–1941; Abuyog, Babatngon, Dulag, Palo, San Miguel, Tacloban, Tanauan, Tolosa
7		Norberto Romualdez	September 1, 1936	November 4, 1941	1st	Nacionalista	Elected in 1936 to finish Enage's term.	1935–1941; Abuyog, Babatngon, Dulag, Palo, San Miguel, Tacloban, Tanauan, Tolosa
7		Norberto Romualdez	September 1, 1936	November 4, 1941	2nd	Nacionalista	Re-elected in 1938. Died.	1935–1941; Abuyog, Babatngon, Dulag, Palo, San Miguel, Tacloban, Tanauan, Tolosa
District dissolved into the two-seat Leyte's at-large district for the National Assembly (Second Philippine Republic).
#	Image	Member	Term of office		Common wealth Congress	Party	Electoral history	Constituent LGUs
#	Image	Member	Start	End	Common wealth Congress	Party	Electoral history	Constituent LGUs
=== Leyte's 4th district for the House of Representatives of the Commonwealth of the Philippines ===
District re-created May 24, 1945.
(4)		Filomeno Montejo	June 11, 1945	May 25, 1946	1st	Nacionalista	Elected in 1941.	1945–1946; Abuyog, Babatngon, Dulag, Palo, San Miguel, Tacloban, Tanauan, Tolosa
#	Image	Member	Term of office		Congress	Party	Electoral history	Constituent LGUs
#	Image	Member	Start	End	Congress	Party	Electoral history	Constituent LGUs
=== Leyte's 4th district for the House of Representatives of the Philippines ===
8		Juan R. Pérez	May 25, 1946	December 30, 1949	1st	Liberal	Elected in 1946.	1946–1949; Abuyog, Babatngon, Dulag, Palo, San Miguel, Tacloban, Tanauan, Tolosa
9		Daniel Z. Romuáldez	December 30, 1949	December 30, 1961	2nd	Nacionalista	Elected in 1949.	1949–1957; Abuyog, Babatngon, Dulag, Palo, San Miguel, Santa Fe, Tacloban, Tanauan, Tolosa
9		Daniel Z. Romuáldez	December 30, 1949	December 30, 1961	3rd	Nacionalista	Re-elected in 1953.	1949–1957; Abuyog, Babatngon, Dulag, Palo, San Miguel, Santa Fe, Tacloban, Tanauan, Tolosa
9		Daniel Z. Romuáldez	December 30, 1949	December 30, 1961	4th	Nacionalista	Re-elected in 1957. Redistricted to the 1st district.	1957–1961; Abuyog, Babatngon, Dulag, MacArthur, Mahaplag, Mayorga, Palo, San Miguel, Santa Fe, Tacloban, Tanauan, Tolosa
10		Dominador Tan	December 30, 1961	December 30, 1969	5th	Nacionalista	Redistricted from the 2nd district and re-elected in 1961.	1961–1972; Albuera, Bato, Baybay, Hilongos, Hindang, Inopacan, Kananga, Matalom, Ormoc
10		Dominador Tan	December 30, 1961	December 30, 1969	6th	Liberal	Re-elected in 1965.	1961–1972; Albuera, Bato, Baybay, Hilongos, Hindang, Inopacan, Kananga, Matalom, Ormoc
11		Rodolfo M. Rivilla	December 30, 1969	September 23, 1972	7th	Nacionalista	Elected in 1969. Removed from office after imposition of martial law.	1961–1972; Albuera, Bato, Baybay, Hilongos, Hindang, Inopacan, Kananga, Matalom, Ormoc
District dissolved into the ten-seat Region VIII's at-large district for the Interim Batasang Pambansa, followed by the five-seat Leyte's at-large district for the Regular Batasang Pambansa.
District re-created February 2, 1987.
12		Carmelo J. Locsin	June 30, 1987	June 30, 1998	8th	PDP–Laban	Elected in 1987.	1987–present Albuera, Isabel, Kananga, Matag-ob, Merida, Ormoc, Palompon
12		Carmelo J. Locsin	June 30, 1987	June 30, 1998	9th	Lakas	Re-elected in 1992.	1987–present Albuera, Isabel, Kananga, Matag-ob, Merida, Ormoc, Palompon
12		Carmelo J. Locsin	June 30, 1987	June 30, 1998	10th	Lakas	Re-elected in 1995.	1987–present Albuera, Isabel, Kananga, Matag-ob, Merida, Ormoc, Palompon
13		Ma. Victoria L. Locsin	June 30, 1998	December 10, 2002	11th	NPC	Elected in 1998.	1987–present Albuera, Isabel, Kananga, Matag-ob, Merida, Ormoc, Palompon
13		Ma. Victoria L. Locsin	June 30, 1998	December 10, 2002	12th	NPC	Re-elected in 2001. Election annulled by House electoral tribunal after an electoral protest.	1987–present Albuera, Isabel, Kananga, Matag-ob, Merida, Ormoc, Palompon
14		Eufrocino M. Codilla Sr.	December 11, 2002	June 30, 2010	12th	Lakas	Declared winner of 2001 elections.	1987–present Albuera, Isabel, Kananga, Matag-ob, Merida, Ormoc, Palompon
14		Eufrocino M. Codilla Sr.	December 11, 2002	June 30, 2010	13th	Lakas	Re-elected in 2004.	1987–present Albuera, Isabel, Kananga, Matag-ob, Merida, Ormoc, Palompon
14		Eufrocino M. Codilla Sr.	December 11, 2002	June 30, 2010	14th	Lakas	Re-elected in 2007.	1987–present Albuera, Isabel, Kananga, Matag-ob, Merida, Ormoc, Palompon
15		Lucy Torres-Gomez	June 30, 2010	March 19, 2013	15th	Liberal	Elected in 2010. Election annulled by the Supreme Court due to being an invalid substitute of disqualified candidate Richard Gomez.	1987–present Albuera, Isabel, Kananga, Matag-ob, Merida, Ormoc, Palompon
15		Lucy Torres-Gomez	June 30, 2013	June 30, 2022	16th	Liberal	Re-elected in 2013.	1987–present Albuera, Isabel, Kananga, Matag-ob, Merida, Ormoc, Palompon
15		Lucy Torres-Gomez	June 30, 2013	June 30, 2022	17th	PDP–Laban	Re-elected in 2016.	1987–present Albuera, Isabel, Kananga, Matag-ob, Merida, Ormoc, Palompon
15		Lucy Torres-Gomez	June 30, 2013	June 30, 2022	18th	PDP–Laban	Re-elected in 2019.	1987–present Albuera, Isabel, Kananga, Matag-ob, Merida, Ormoc, Palompon
16		Richard Gomez	June 30, 2022	Incumbent	19th	PDP–Laban	Elected in 2022.	1987–present Albuera, Isabel, Kananga, Matag-ob, Merida, Ormoc, Palompon
16		Richard Gomez	June 30, 2022	Incumbent	20th	PFP	Re-elected in 2025.	1987–present Albuera, Isabel, Kananga, Matag-ob, Merida, Ormoc, Palompon

== Election results ==
=== 2025 ===
Candidate	Party	Votes	%
Richard Gomez (incumbent)	Partido Federal ng Pilipinas	172,483	56.94
Ching Veloso	National Unity Party	130,415	43.06
Total		302,898	100.00
Registered voters/turnout		353,329	–
Partido Federal ng Pilipinas hold			
Source: Commission on Elections

=== 2022 ===
2022 Philippine House of Representatives elections
Party	Candidate	Votes	%
PDP–Laban	Richard Gomez	148,941	
Independent	Goyo Larrazabal	117,912	
Total votes			100.00%
PDP–Laban hold			

=== 2019 ===
2019 Philippine House of Representatives elections
Party	Candidate	Votes	%
PDP–Laban	Lucy Torres-Gomez (incumbent)	178,919	
Lakas	Winnie Codilla	51,155	
Total votes			100.00%
PDP–Laban hold			

=== 2016 ===
2016 Philippine House of Representatives elections
Party	Candidate	Votes	%
Liberal	Lucy Torres-Gomez (incumbent)	137,601	62.50%
Aksyon	Violy Codilla	82,557	37.50%
Valid ballots		220,158	89.86%
Margin of victory		55,044	25.00%
Invalid or blank votes		24,846	10.14%
Total votes		245,004	100.00%
Liberal hold			

=== 2013 ===
2013 Philippine House of Representatives elections
Party	Candidate	Votes	%
Liberal	Lucy Torres-Gomez (incumbent)	106,291	53.29
Lakas	Eric Codilla	78,662	39.44
Margin of victory		27,629	13.85%
Invalid or blank votes		14,510	7.27
Total votes		199,463	100.00
Liberal hold			

=== 2010 ===
2010 Philippine House of Representatives elections
Party	Candidate	Votes	%
Liberal	Lucy Torres-Gomez	101,250	56.79
Lakas–Kampi	Eufrocino Codilla, Jr.	76,549	42.93
Independent	Silverio Tagolino	493	0.28
Valid ballots		178,292	94.01
Invalid or blank votes		11,352	5.99
Total votes		189,644	100.00
Liberal gain from Lakas–Kampi			

=== 1936 special ===
1936 Leyte's 4th National Assembly district special election
Candidate	Votes	%
Norberto Romualdez	7,033	76.32
Antonio Marcos	2,182	23.68
Total	9,215	100.00
Majority	4,851	52.64

== See also ==
- Legislative districts of Leyte

House of Representatives of the Philippines
Preceded by Batangas's 3rd congressional district	Home district of the speaker January 27, 1958 – December 30, 1961	Succeeded by Leyte's 1st congressional district
