= Leyte (province) =

- Province
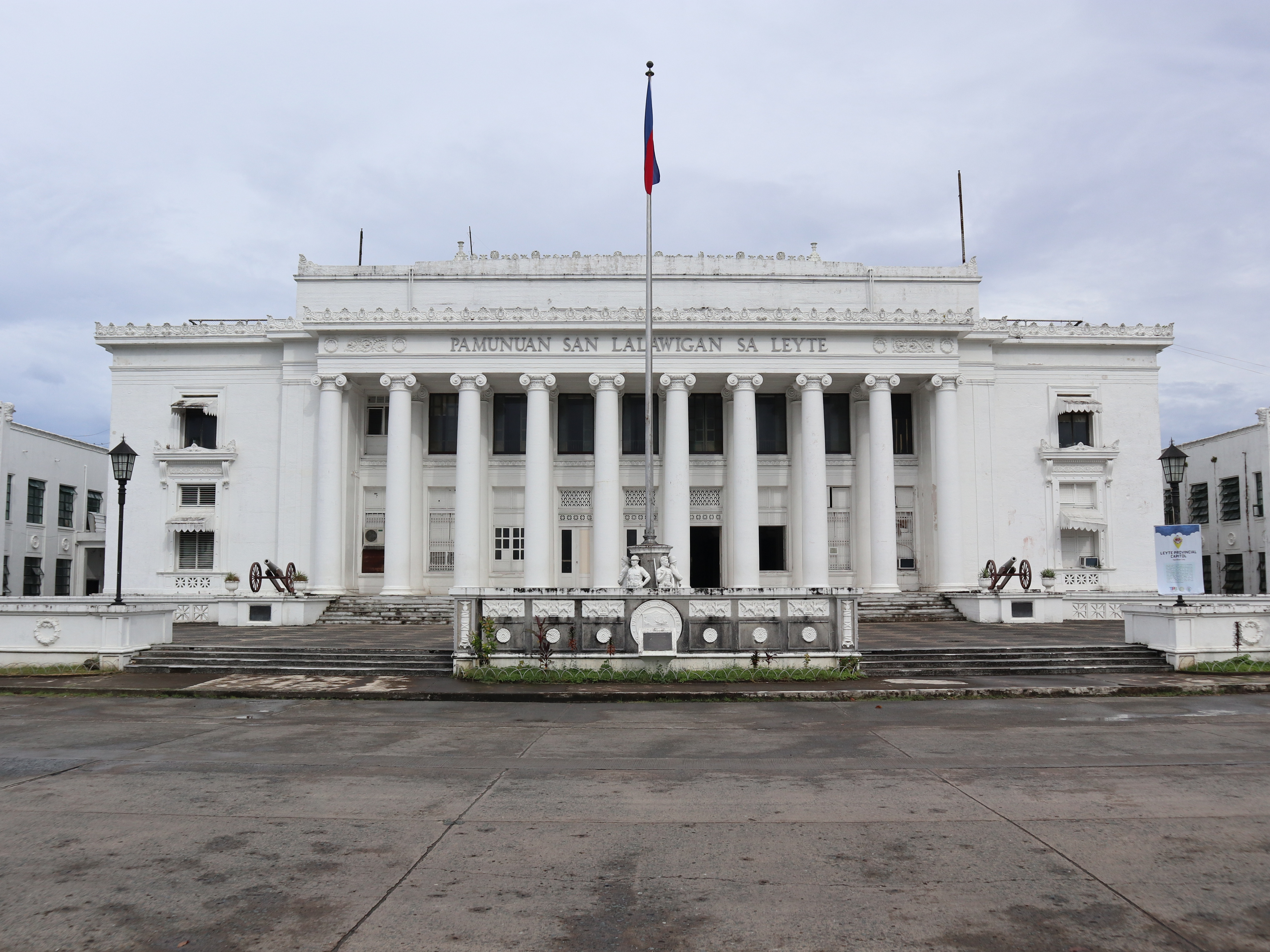
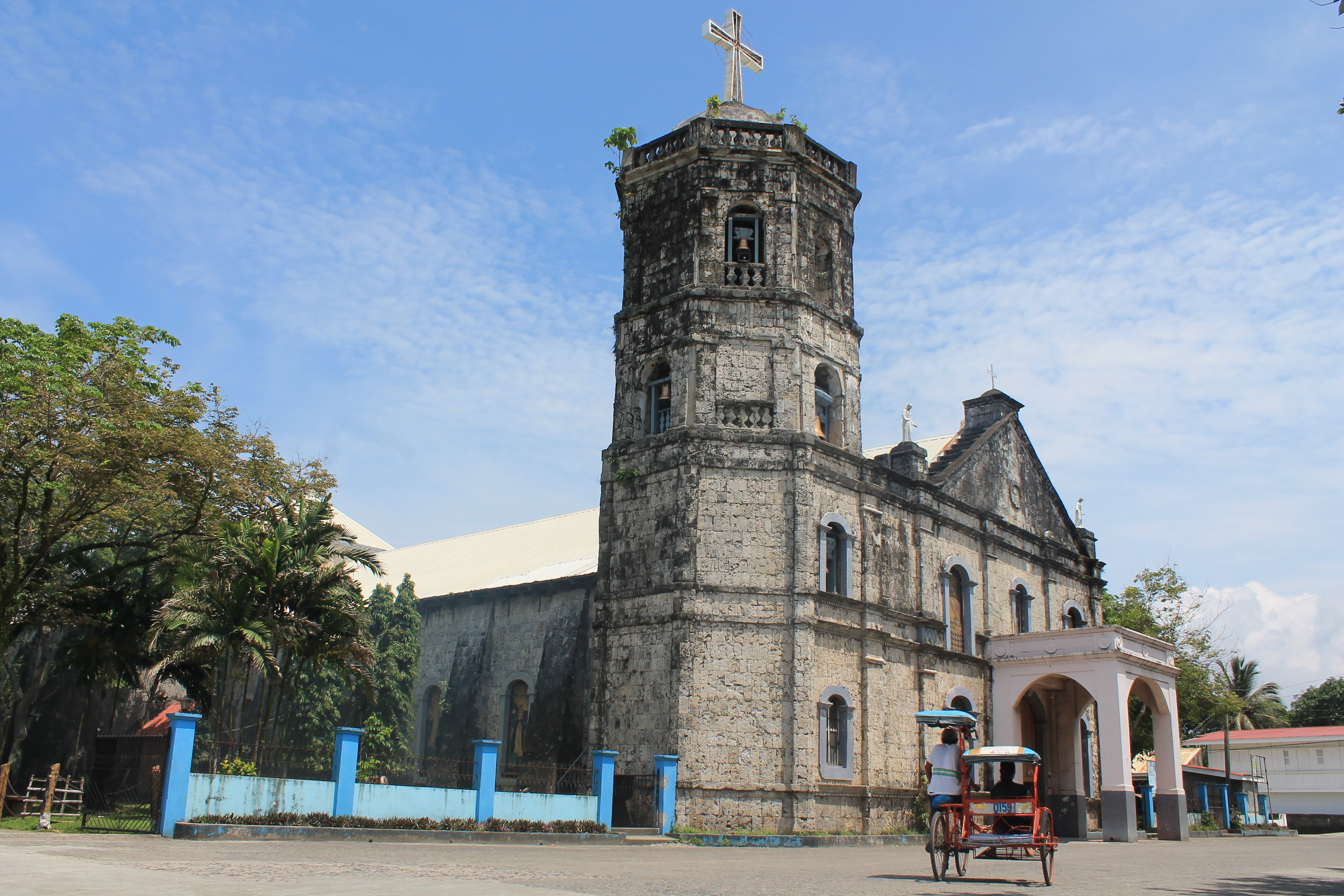
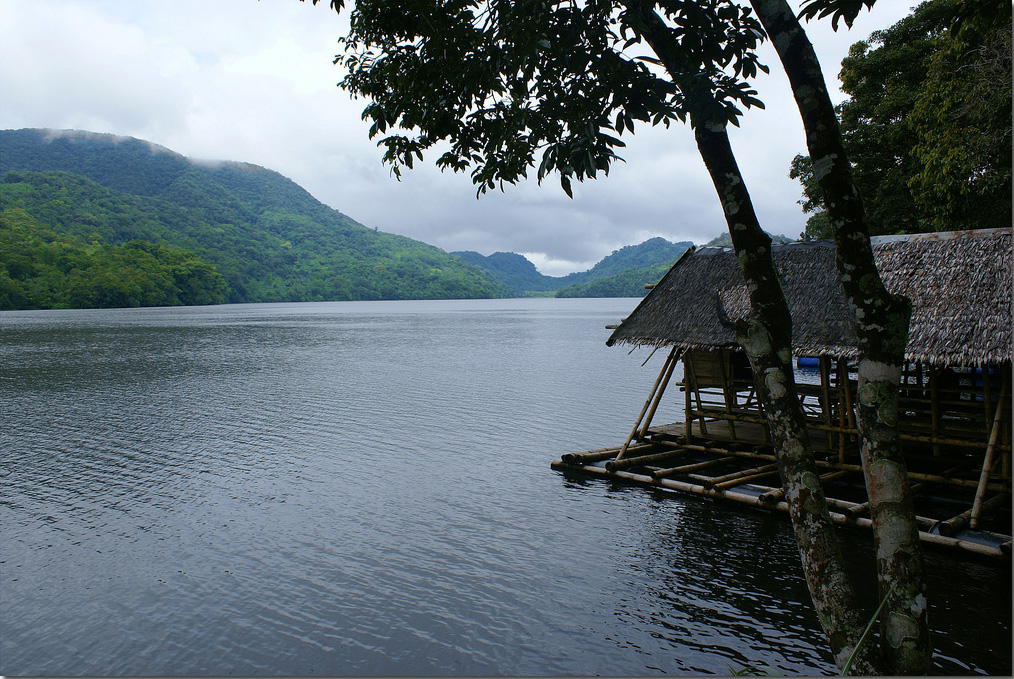
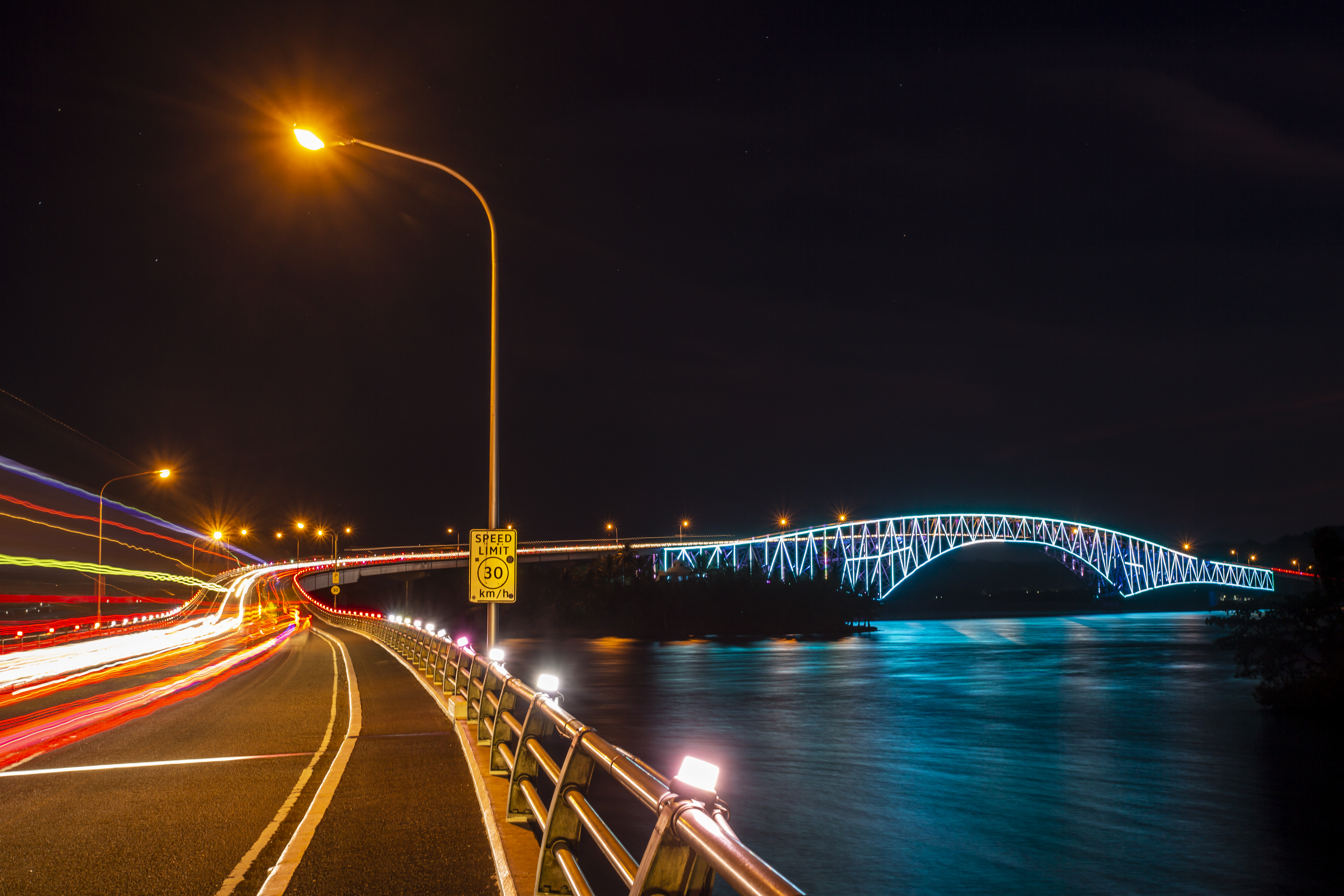
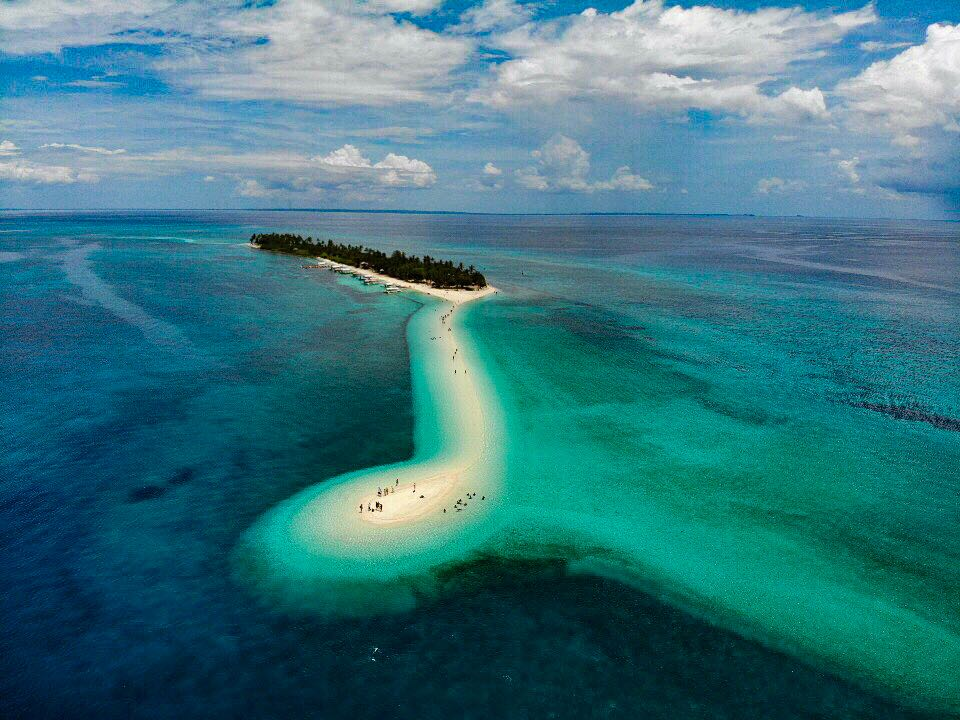
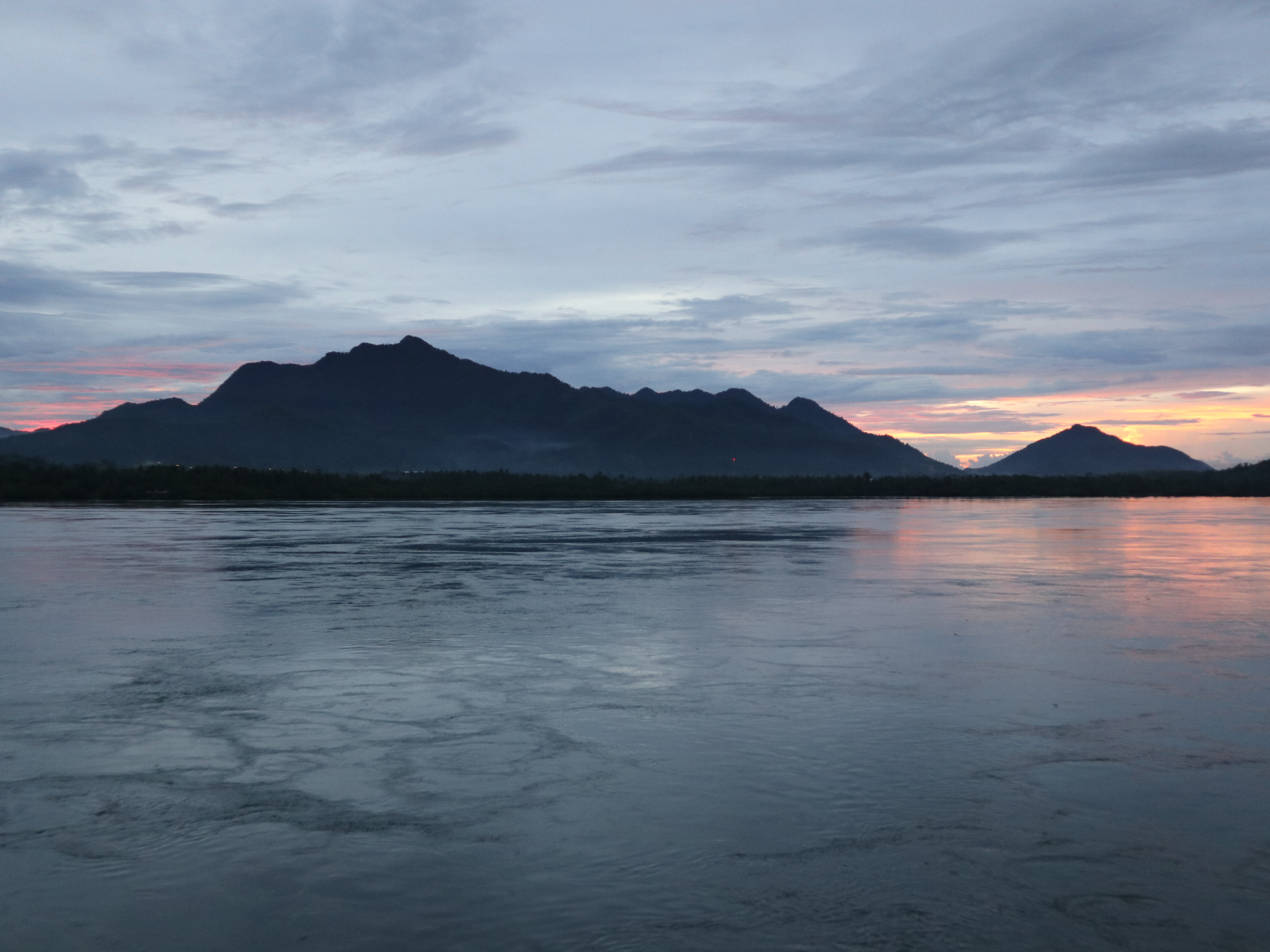
- (from top: left to right) Leyte Provincial Capitol, The Immaculate Conception Church in Baybay, Leyte, Lake Danao, San Juanico Bridge, Kalanggaman Island and San Juanico Strait

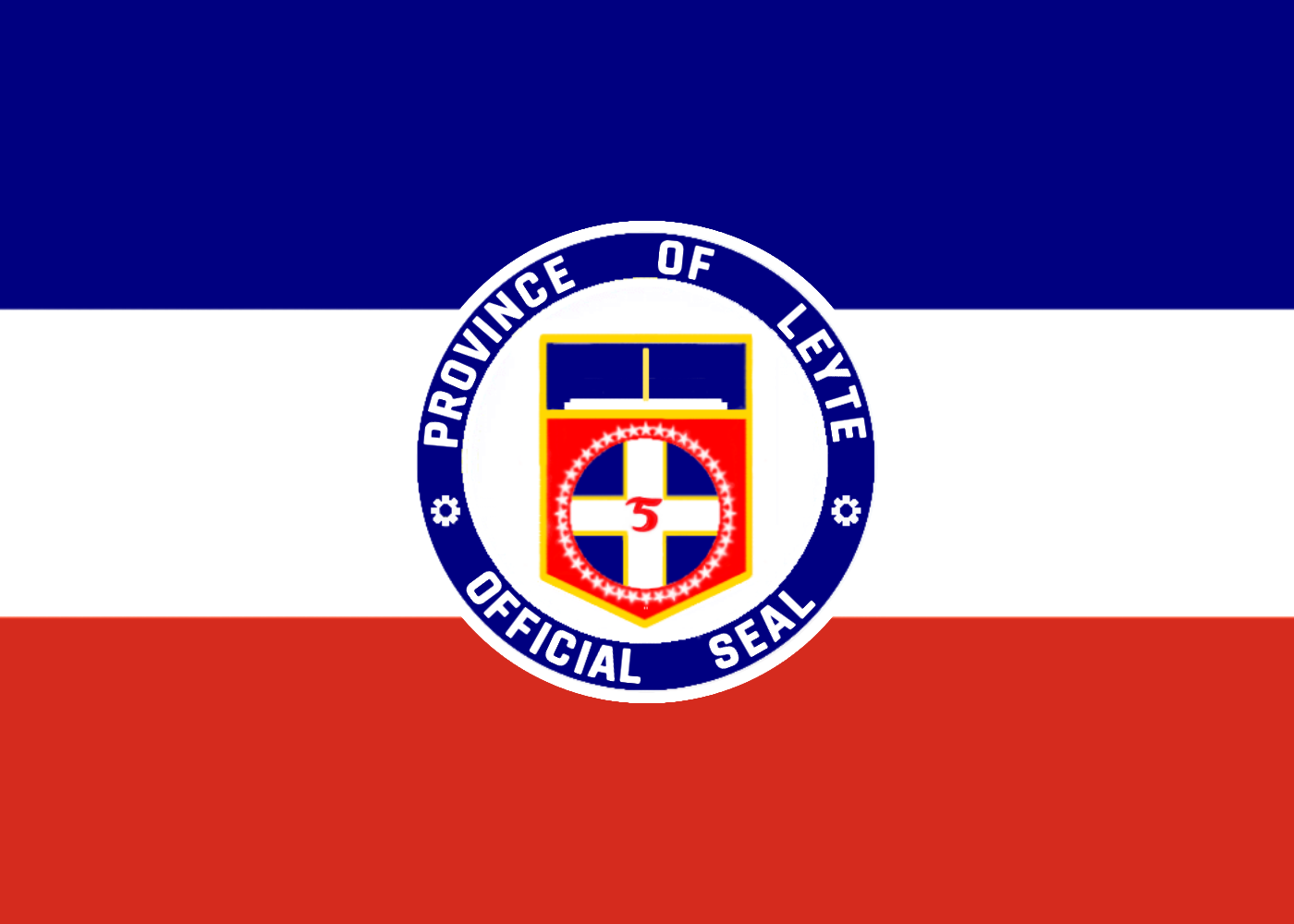
- Flag Seal

- Location in the Philippines
- Interactive map of Leyte
- Coordinates: 11°00′N 124°51′E
- Country: Philippines
- Region: Eastern Visayas
- Founded: 1735
- Capital and largest city: Tacloban*
- Government seat: Palo (Note: Tacloban officially serves as the designated provincial capital, but the provincial government conducts its administration from a new provincial capitol located in Palo.)

Government
  - Governor: Carlos Jericho L. Petilla (NPC)
  - Vice Governor: Leonardo M. Javier Jr. (NPC)
  - Legislature: Leyte Provincial Board
  - Electorate: 1,401,054 voters (2025)

Area
  - Total: 6,313.33 km^{2} (2,437.59 sq mi)
  - Rank: 13th out of 82
- (excludes Tacloban City)
- Highest elevation (Alto Peak): 1,332 m (4,370 ft)

Population (2024 census)
  - Total: 1,823,458
  - Rank: 14th out of 82
  - Density: 288.827/km^{2} (748.058/sq mi)
  - Rank: 34th out of 82
  - Households: 402,126
- (excludes Tacloban City)
- Demonym(s): Leytehanon; Leyteño (Spanish)

Divisions
  - Independent cities: 2: Ormoc**; Tacloban*
  - Component cities: 1: Baybay
  - Municipalities: 40: Abuyog; Alangalang; Albuera; Babatngon; Barugo; Bato; Burauen; Calubian; Capoocan; Carigara; Dagami; Dulag; Hilongos; Hindang; Inopacan; Isabel; Jaro; Javier; Julita; Kananga; La Paz; Leyte; MacArthur; Mahaplag; Matag-ob; Matalom; Mayorga; Merida; Palo; Palompon; Pastrana; San Isidro; San Miguel; Santa Fe; Tabango; Tabontabon; Tanauan; Tolosa; Tunga; Villaba
  - Barangays: 1,393; including independent cities: 1,641
  - Districts: Legislative districts of Leyte (shared with Ormoc and Tacloban cities)

Economy
  - Income class: 1st provincial income class
  - Poverty incidence: 20.6% (2023)
  - Revenue: ₱ 4,523 million (2024)
  - Assets: ₱ 19,692 million (2024)
  - Expenditure: ₱ 2,799 million (2024)
  - Liabilities: ₱ 3,285 million (2024)
- Time zone: UTC+8 (PST)
- PSGC: 083700000
- IDD : area code: +63 (0)53
- ISO 3166 code: PH-LEY
- Spoken languages: Waray-Waray; Cebuano; Baybayanon; English; Tagalog
- Website: http://leyteprovince.gov.ph/
- * Tacloban is a highly-urbanized city, politically independent from Leyte. ** Ormoc is an independent-component city.

Leyte, (Note: also Northern Leyte; Waray: Norte san/Amihanan nga Leyte/Probinsya han Leyte; Cebuano: Amihanang Leyte; Tagalog: Hilagang Leyte) officially the Province of Leyte, is a province in the Philippines located in the Eastern Visayas region occupying the northern three-quarters of Leyte Island. Its capital and largest city is Tacloban, the regional center of Eastern Visayas, which is administered independently from the province alongside Ormoc. Both cities are grouped with the province primarily through their respective legislative representation and statistical purposes.

The province borders Southern Leyte to the south, Biliran to the north, and Samar Island to the east across the San Juanico Strait. To the west across the Camotes Sea is the province of Cebu.

The historical name of the Philippines, "Las Islas Felipenas", named by Spanish explorer Ruy López de Villalobos in honor of Prince Philip of Spain, used to refer to the islands of Leyte and Samar only, until it was adopted to refer to the entire archipelago.

The island of Leyte was known as Tandaya in the 16th century.

Leyte is also known as the site of the largest naval battle in modern history, the Battle of Leyte Gulf, which took place during the Second World War.

Leyte is especially prone to typhoons because it geographically faces toward the Pacific Ocean. On 8 November 2013, the province was severely affected by Super Typhoon Yolanda (Haiyan). The typhoon, known internationally as Haiyan, and domestically referred to as Yolanda, killed thousands of people and garnered significant international media attention. Leyte suffered similar destruction and loss of life in 1991 from Tropical Storm Uring (Thelma).

In 2022, the provincial government moved its seat of government from Tacloban to Palo following the inauguration of the new Leyte Provincial Capitol. However, Tacloban remains the official capital of the province pending an enabling law.

== History ==
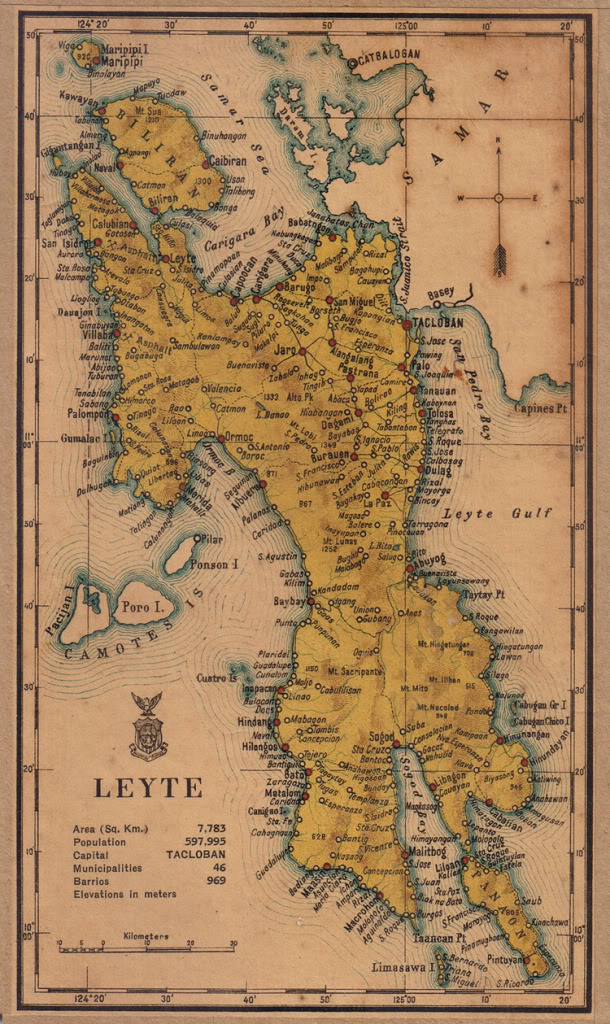
Leyte province in 1918, before its division into three provinces, namely Leyte, Southern Leyte and Biliran

=== Early history ===
The island of Leyte was once the location of Mairete, meaning land of Ete, a historic community which was ruled by Datu Ete centered in the present-day municipality of Leyte and nearby towns. It was the oldest city-state in the entire Eastern Visayas region. Before being colonized by Spain, the island was once home to indigenous animist Warays to the East and other indigenous Hindu-Buddhist Visayan groups to the west.

=== Spanish colonial era ===
The Spanish explorer Ruy López de Villalobos, first came to the island in 1543 and named it Las Islas Felipinas. When the Spanish government established a government in Cebu, Leyte and Samar became part of the province of Cebu. In 1595, the religious Jesuits established a mission in Carigara which preceded the mission established in Palo in 1596 and Ormoc and Alangalang missions in 1597. In 1735, Leyte and Samar were separated from Cebu to be established as a single provincial government with Carigara as the first provincial capital. Leyte had jurisdiction over Samar. In 1768, Leyte and Samar were split into two separate provinces. The 1818 census showed that Leyte had 16,244 native families and 56 Spanish-Filipino families.

=== American colonial era ===
On March 27, 1923, Act No 3117 was proposed to divide Leyte into Occidental Leyte and Oriental Leyte but was not proclaimed by the Governor-General of the Philippines.

=== Japanese occupation ===
During the World War II era, the Leyte Provincial Capitol briefly became the seat of the Philippine Commonwealth Government.

==== Battle of Leyte Gulf ====
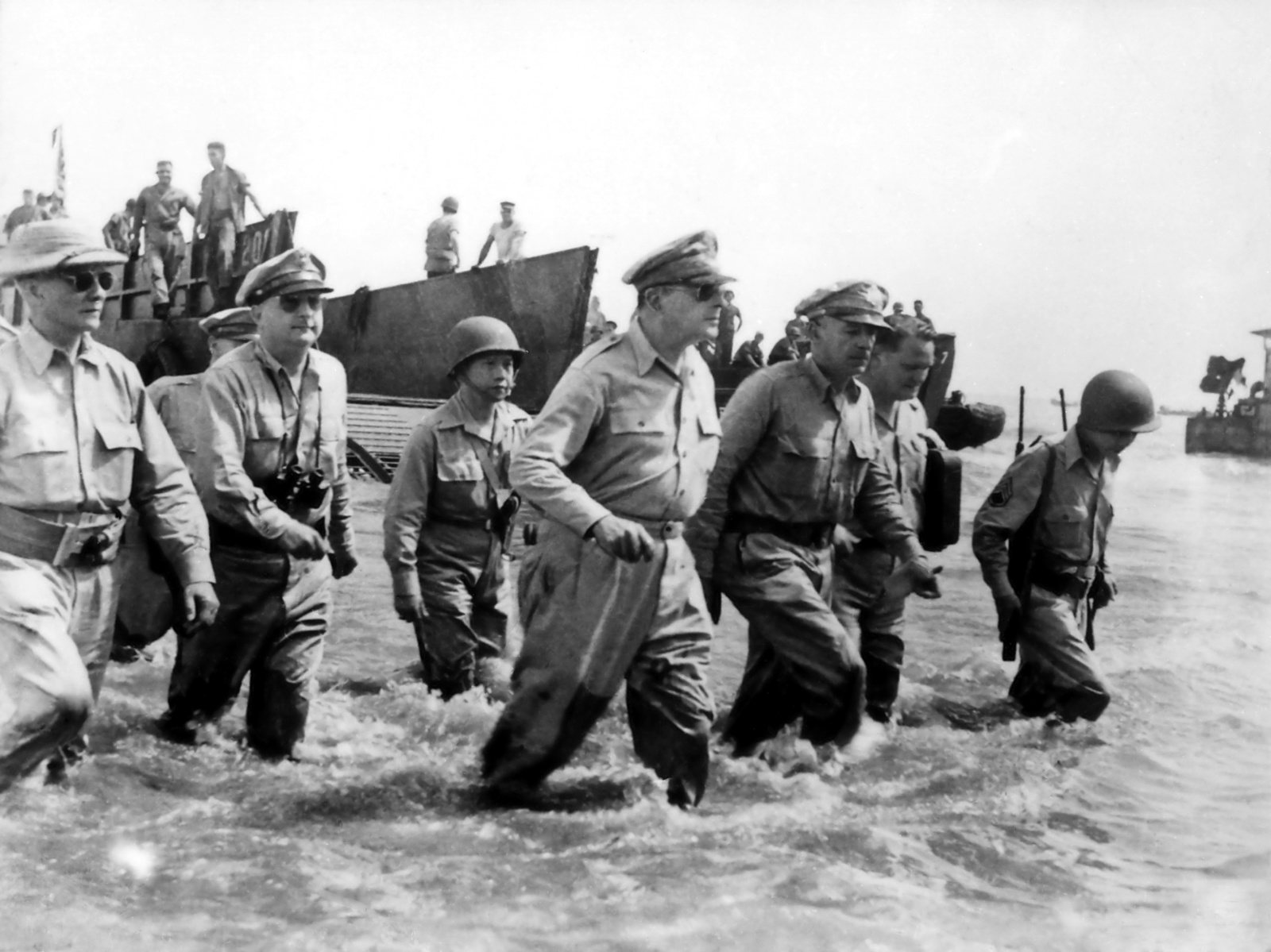
When Americans stormed ashore at Leyte, it fulfilled the promise to return made by Gen. Douglas MacArthur in the days following the fall of the Philippines to the Japanese in 1942.

The Battle of Leyte Gulf took place in the seas surrounding this island from October 23 to 26, 1944. It was the largest naval battle in modern history, when at least 212 Allied ships clashed with the remnants of the Imperial Japanese Navy, some 60 ships, including the super battleships Yamato and Musashi.

The First Battle of Leyte occurred on October 20, 1944. A successful Allied invasion of the island was the crucial element to the eventual Filipino and American victory in the Philippines.

=== Contemporary ===
On April 8, 1959, Biliran became a sub-province of Leyte by virtue of Republic Act No. 2141. On May 22, 1959, Republic Act No. 2227 was passed into law that separated the third Congressional District of Leyte, then comprising the southern portion of the namesake island, into a separate province of Southern Leyte.

=== Martial law era ===
The beginning months of the 1970s had marked a period of turmoil and change in the Philippines, as well as in Leyte. During his bid to be the first Philippine president to be re-elected for a second term, Ferdinand Marcos launched an unprecedented number of foreign debt-funded public works projects. This caused the Philippine economy to take a sudden downwards turn known as the 1969 Philippine balance of payments crisis, which led to a period of economic difficulty and a significant rise of social unrest. With only a year left in his last constitutionally allowed term as president, Ferdinand Marcos placed the Philippines under Martial Law in September 1972 and thus retained the position for fourteen more years. This period in Philippine history is remembered for the Marcos administration's record of human rights abuses, particularly targeting political opponents, student activists, journalists, religious workers, farmers, and others who fought against the Marcos dictatorship.

In Leyte particularly, Human Rights documentors were able to identify numerous cases of murders, abductions, tortures, maulings, as well as hamleting of communities in the towns of Abuyog, Javier, Mac Arthur Burauen, Hindang, Hilongos, Baybay, Inopacan and Mahaplag and in the Southern Leyte Barangays of San Juan, Anahawan, Hinunangan and Sodong - all in the year 1985 alone. The hamlet created by the military in Barangay Pikasor in the Municipality of Abuyog was particularly notable because paramilitary forces massacred the residents who had been gathered there that year.

This era also saw the construction of the San Juanico Bridge between Samar and Leyte, which began as one of the high-visibility foreign-loan funded projects of Ferdinand Marcos’ 1969 reelection campaign, and finished four years later in time to be inaugurated on then-First Lady Imelda Marcos' birthday on July 2, 1973. The project was initially criticised as a white elephant by officials at the National Economic and Development Authority, noting that it was "useless and expensive to maintain", because its average daily traffic was too low to justify the cost of its construction. As a result, its construction has been associated with what has been called the Marcoses' "edifice complex" although economic activity in Samar and Leyte has since finally caught up with the bridge's intended function. At the time, its name was used as a slang term for onte of the torture methods used by the Marcos dictatorship, in which a person being beaten while the victim's head and feet lay on separate beds and the body is suspended as though to form a bridge.

=== Contemporary ===
==== Creation of Biliran ====
On May 11, 1992, Biliran was separated from Leyte to become an independent province, by virtue of Republic Act No. 7160.

==== Proposed renaming of Province ====
In September 2017, Representative Roger Mercado authored House Bill 6408, proposing to change the name of the province to Leyte del Norte.

==== Proposed creation of Western Leyte ====
In November 2024, 4th District Representative Richard Gomez filed House Bill No. 11077, seeking to create Western Leyte, which would cover two cities (Ormoc and Baybay) and 16 municipalities (Albuera, Bato, Calubian, Hilongos, Hindang, Inopacan, Isabel, Kananga, Leyte, Matag-ob, Matalom, Merida, Palompon, San Isidro, Tabango, and Villaba) where Cebuano is predominantly spoken. Thus, corresponding to the entirety of Leyte's 3rd and 4th congressional districts as well as most of the 5th. The remaining areas of Leyte, where Waray is predominantly spoken, would remain intact. However, the proposal was met by opposition from Leyte Governor Jericho Petilla, 41 of 42 mayors in Leyte, and the Sangguniang Bayan (municipal council) of Palompon. Only one mayor, the one from Kananga, is willing to support the split.

== Geography ==
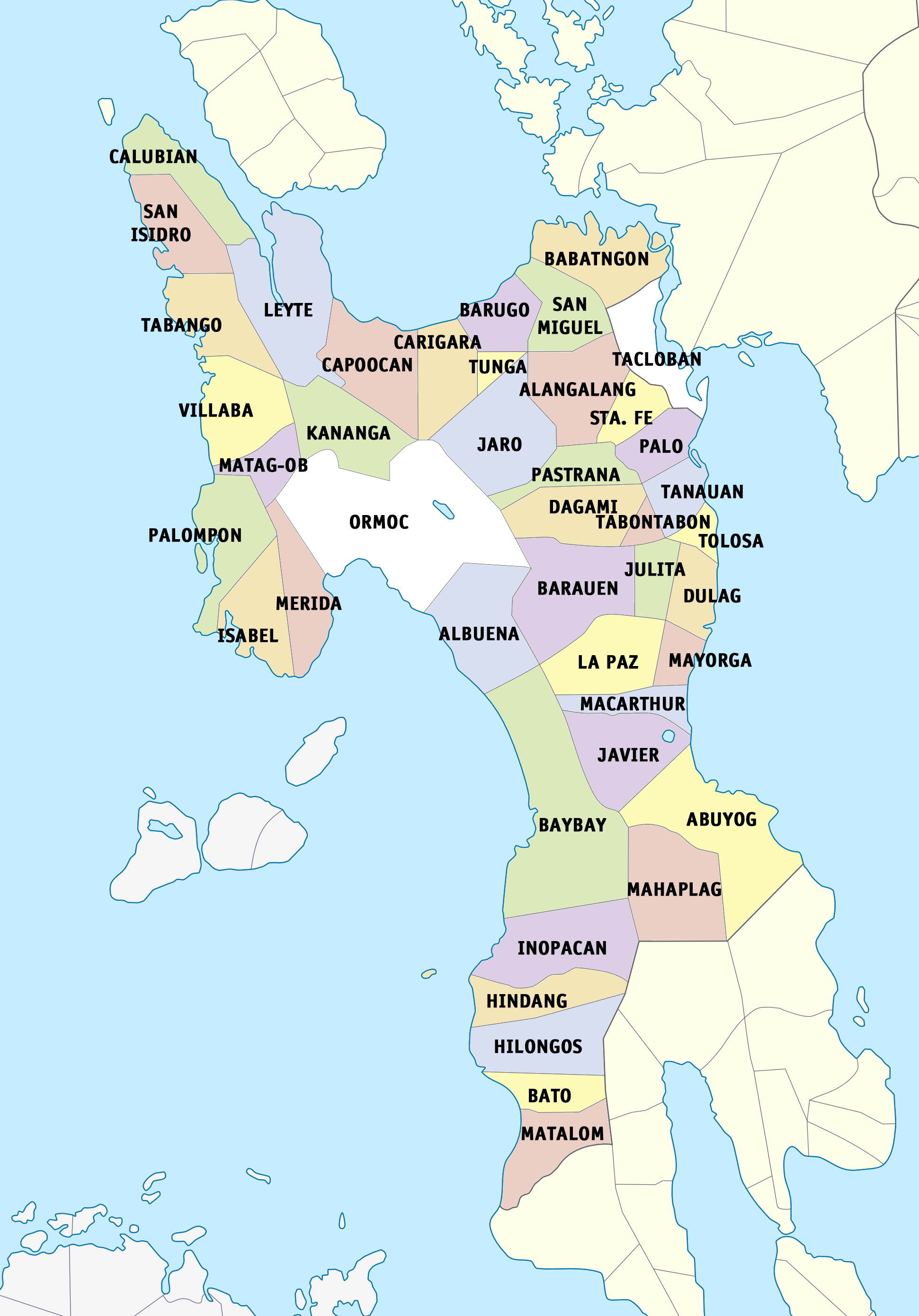
Political map of Leyte

Leyte covers a total area of 6,313.33 square kilometres (2,437.59 sq mi), occupying the northern and central sections of Leyte Island in the Eastern Visayas region. The province is situated west of Samar Island, north of Southern Leyte, south of Biliran, and east of the Camotes Sea.

=== Administrative divisions ===
Leyte comprises 40 municipalities and three cities, all clustered into 6 congressional districts.

Ormoc is an independent component city, while the capital Tacloban was declared a highly urbanized city in 2008. Both cities govern themselves independently of the province and their residents do not vote for elective provincial officials.

Baybay attained cityhood in 2007 but reverted to its municipal status when the Supreme Court declared its city charter unconstitutional in 2008. It regained its city status following the reversal of the Supreme Court decision dated December 22, 2009. In August 2010, however, a resolution had been passed reverting 16 cities, one of which was Baybay, to municipal status. It was on February 15, 2011, that the Supreme Court reversed its decision once again, allowing Baybay, along with the other 16 cities, to retain their cityhood status.

- † Provincial capital and highly urbanized city
- ^ Independent component city
- ∗ Component city
- Municipality

City or municipality^{[A]}		District	Population			±% p.a.	Area		Density		Barangay	Coordinates^{[B]}
			(2020)		(2015)		km^{2}	sq mi	/km^{2}	/sq mi		
Abuyog		5th	3.4%	61,216	59,571	+0.52%	688.25	265.73	89	230	63	10°44′50″N 125°00′41″E
Alangalang		1st	3.2%	57,185	55,235	+0.66%	150.54	58.12	380	980	54	11°12′24″N 124°50′45″E
Albuera		4th	2.7%	47,151	46,332	+0.33%	303.35	117.12	160	410	16	10°55′05″N 124°41′45″E
Babatngon		1st	1.6%	28,823	27,797	+0.69%	115.18	44.47	250	650	25	11°25′24″N 124°50′46″E
Barugo		6th	1.9%	34,497	32,745	+1.00%	84.62	32.67	410	1,100	37	11°19′30″N 124°44′13″E
Bato		5th	2.2%	38,505	38,356	+0.07%	72.45	27.97	530	1,400	32	10°19′43″N 124°47′20″E
Baybay City	∗	5th	6.3%	111,848	109,432	+0.42%	459.34	177.35	240	620	92	10.6771°N 124.7970°E
Burauen		2nd	3.0%	52,511	52,732	−0.08%	265.33	102.44	200	520	77	10°58′27″N 124°53′35″E
Calubian		3rd	1.8%	31,646	31,228	+0.25%	100.95	38.98	310	800	53	11°26′45″N 124°25′41″E
Capoocan		6th	1.9%	33,721	33,617	+0.06%	185.40	71.58	180	470	21	11°17′37″N 124°38′34″E
Carigara		6th	3.1%	54,656	51,345	+1.20%	117.86	45.51	460	1,200	49	11°17′58″N 124°41′20″E
Dagami		2nd	2.0%	36,178	35,147	+0.55%	161.65	62.41	220	570	65	11°03′42″N 124°54′09″E
Dulag		2nd	2.8%	48,992	47,300	+0.67%	110.70	42.74	440	1,100	45	10°57′10″N 125°01′56″E
Hilongos		5th	3.6%	64,514	63,431	+0.32%	192.92	74.49	330	850	51	10°22′22″N 124°44′54″E
Hindang		5th	1.2%	20,849	20,924	−0.07%	50.04	19.32	420	1,100	20	10°26′02″N 124°43′35″E
Inopacan		5th	1.2%	21,389	20,550	+0.76%	94.62	36.53	230	600	20	10°29′57″N 124°44′22″E
Isabel		4th	2.6%	46,781	46,915	−0.05%	64.01	24.71	730	1,900	24	10°55′30″N 124°26′18″E
Jaro		6th	2.5%	43,758	43,199	+0.25%	207.19	80.00	210	540	46	11°11′19″N 124°46′56″E
Javier (Bugho)		5th	1.5%	26,658	25,379	+0.94%	152.70	58.96	170	440	28	10°47′39″N 124°56′10″E
Julita		2nd	0.9%	15,598	15,114	+0.60%	53.30	20.58	290	750	26	10°58′22″N 124°57′44″E
Kananga		4th	3.4%	59,696	56,575	+1.03%	144.20	55.68	410	1,100	23	11°11′07″N 124°33′38″E
La Paz		2nd	1.1%	19,174	19,998	−0.80%	72.70	28.07	260	670	35	10°53′27″N 124°57′27″E
Leyte		3rd	2.3%	40,397	40,639	−0.11%	181.26	69.98	220	570	30	11°22′12″N 124°29′12″E
MacArthur		2nd	1.2%	21,578	21,211	+0.33%	57.57	22.23	370	960	31	10°50′05″N 124°59′47″E
Mahaplag		5th	1.6%	27,865	27,823	+0.03%	104.79	40.46	270	700	28	10°36′16″N 124°57′56″E
Matag-ob		4th	1.0%	17,522	18,373	−0.90%	104.40	40.31	170	440	21	11°08′47″N 124°28′22″E
Matalom		5th	1.8%	32,586	33,121	−0.31%	132.00	50.97	250	650	30	10°16′59″N 124°47′16″E
Mayorga		2nd	1.0%	18,071	17,161	+0.99%	42.17	16.28	430	1,100	16	10°54′10″N 125°00′21″E
Merida		4th	1.8%	31,574	29,863	+1.07%	95.21	36.76	330	850	22	10°54′32″N 124°32′17″E
Ormoc	^	4th	13.0%	230,998	215,031	+1.37%	613.60	236.91	380	980	110	11°00′16″N 124°36′27″E
Palo		1st	4.3%	76,213	70,052	+1.62%	221.27	85.43	340	880	33	11°09′36″N 124°59′24″E
Palompon		4th	3.3%	58,313	58,108	+0.07%	126.07	48.68	460	1,200	50	11°03′00″N 124°23′13″E
Pastrana		6th	1.1%	19,359	18,002	+1.39%	86.35	33.34	220	570	29	11°08′12″N 124°53′10″E
San Isidro		3rd	1.7%	30,722	31,641	−0.56%	122.50	47.30	250	650	19	11°24′19″N 124°21′08″E
San Miguel		1st	1.1%	19,753	19,420	+0.32%	145.11	56.03	140	360	21	11°17′36″N 124°49′54″E
Santa Fe		1st	1.2%	22,102	20,439	+1.50%	53.97	20.84	410	1,100	20	11°11′09″N 124°54′55″E
Tabango		3rd	1.9%	33,868	34,195	−0.18%	96.62	37.31	350	910	13	11°18′23″N 124°22′19″E
Tabontabon		2nd	0.7%	11,902	11,204	+1.16%	24.18	9.34	490	1,300	16	11°02′30″N 124°57′52″E
Tacloban	‡	Lone	—	251,881	242,089	+0.76%	201.72	77.88	1,200	3,100	138	11°14′35″N 125°00′29″E
Tanauan		1st	3.2%	57,455	55,021	+0.83%	78.41	30.27	730	1,900	54	11°06′34″N 125°01′14″E
Tolosa		1st	1.2%	20,708	20,978	−0.25%	22.54	8.70	920	2,400	15	11°03′41″N 125°02′14″E
Tunga		6th	0.4%	7,656	7,584	+0.18%	7.70	2.97	990	2,600	8	11°14′54″N 124°45′09″E
Villaba		3rd	2.4%	42,859	41,891	+0.44%	150.31	58.04	290	750	35	11°12′47″N 124°23′36″E
Total^{[C]}				1,776,847	1,724,679	+0.57%	6,313.33	2,437.59	280	730	1,503	(see GeoGroup box)
1. Former names are italicized.; 2. Coordinates mark the city/town center, and are sortable by latitude 3. Total figures include the independent component city of Ormoc, and exclude the highly urbanized city of Tacloban.

== Demographics ==
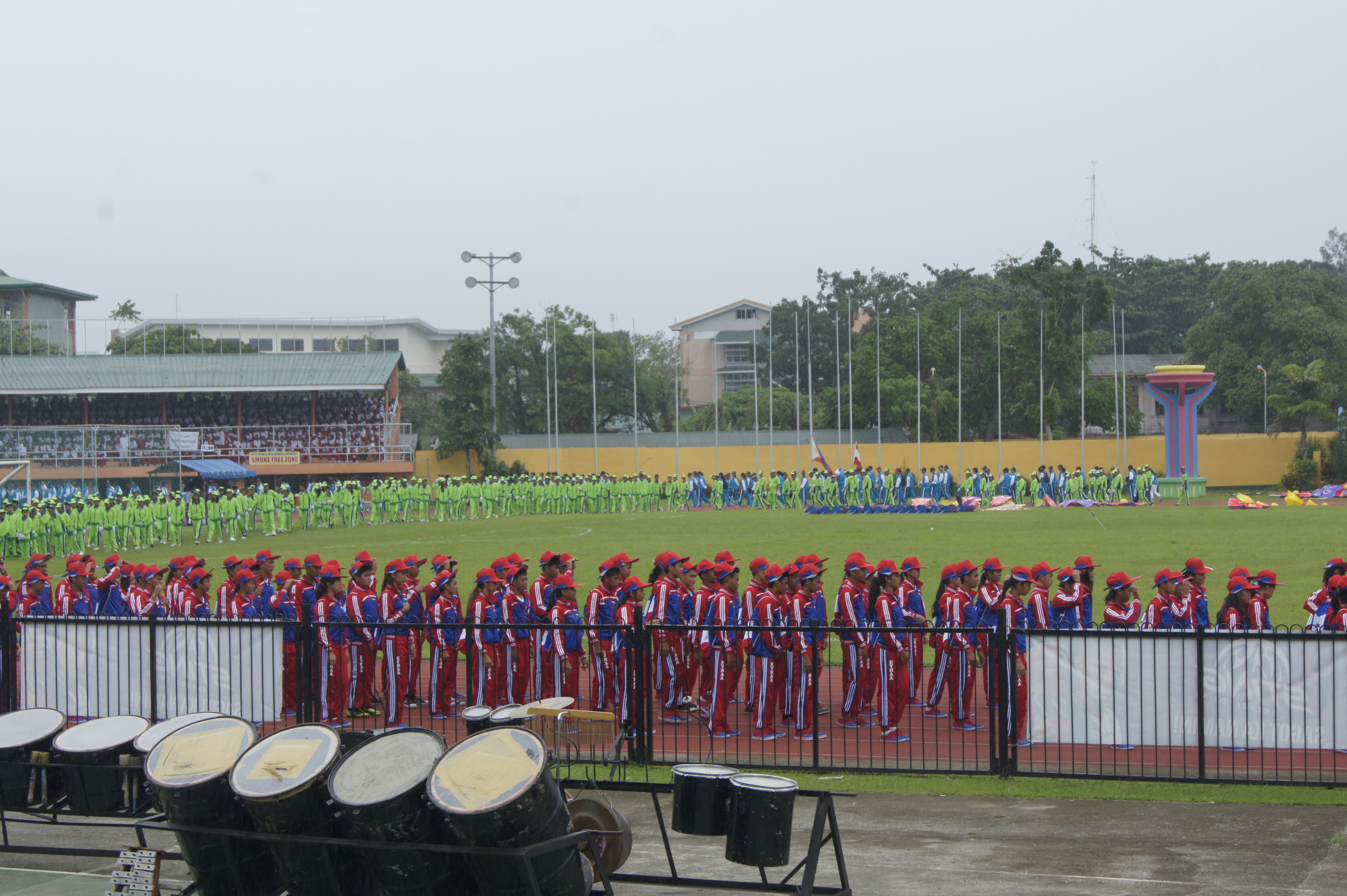
Leyte Sports Development Center

The population of Leyte in the 2024 census was 1,823,458 people, with a density of 290 inhabitants per square kilometre or 750 inhabitants per square mile. When Tacloban is included for geographical purposes, the population comes to 1,966,768 people, with a density of 302/km^{2} (782/sq mi).

Population census of Leyte (province)

Year	Pop.	±% p.a.
1903	294,892	—
1918	440,328	+2.71%
1939	688,934	+2.15%
1948	751,649	+0.97%
1960	876,079	+1.28%
1970	1,020,128	+1.53%

Year	Pop.	±% p.a.
1975	1,099,848	+1.52%
1980	1,191,227	+1.61%
1990	1,367,816	+1.39%
1995	1,511,251	+1.89%
2000	1,592,336	+1.13%
2007	1,724,240	+1.10%

Year	Pop.	±% p.a.
2010	1,567,984	−3.40%
2015	1,724,679	+1.83%
2020	1,776,847	+0.63%
2024	1,823,458	+0.62%

(excluding Tacloban City)
Source: Philippine Statistics Authority

The people of Leyte province are subdivided into two closely related Visayan ethnolinguistic groups. In the northern, central and eastern parts are the Warays and in the western part are the Cebuanos.

Tacloban-Waray dialect is considered as the standard form of Waray language and is used as the de facto lingua franca in both Leyte and Samar Islands. Aside from Cebuano and Waray, most Leyteños can also speak and understand Filipino and English. Some students who have studied the Spanish language and a few descendants of Spanish colonists can also speak and understand Spanish.

Leyte is predominantly a Roman Catholic Christian province. The 2000 census stated that 97% of Leyte's population adhered to Roman Catholicism, one of the highest percentages in the Visayas. The remaining 3% were adherents of other different Christian denominations and sects, such as the indigenous Iglesia ni Cristo, the Kingdom of Jesus Christ and Members Church of God International, popularly known as Ang Dating Daan, and many other foreign religious groups like the Mormons, Born Again Christians, Baptists, Pentecostals, Seventh-Day Adventists (Sabadistas), and many more.

Islam is also present in the province and concentrated in the metropolitan Tacloban area. It comprises 0.3% of Tacloban City's population, and its adherents are mainly the Maranao people and other Moro migrants from Mindanao who work mostly as traders.

== Government ==
Current Provincial Government Officials (2025-2028)

- Governor: Carlos Jericho L. Petilla (NPC)
- Vice-Governor: Leonardo M. Javier Jr. (NPC)

Sangguniang Panlalawigan Members:

1st District:

- Wilson S. Uy (NPC)
- Ronnan Christian M. Reposar (Liberal)

2nd District:

- Raissa J. Villasin (NPC)
- Mildred Joy P. Que (PFP)

3rd District:

- Marie Kathryn V. Kabigting (NUP)
- Allan P. Ang (NUP)

4th District:

- Flaviano C. Centino Jr. (NUP)
- Elmer Frederico N. Codilla (NUP)

5th District

- Michael L. Cari (NPC)
- Carlo P. Loreto (NPC)

Ex-Officio Members:

- Ma. Martina L. Gimenez (President, Liga ng mga Barangay)
- Chiqui Ruth C. Uy (President, PCL)
- MJ Luinly D. Lumen (President, Panlalawigang Pederasyon ng Sangguniang Kabataan)

=== House of Representatives ===
District	Representative	Party	Term	Bloc
1st	Ferdinand Martin G. Romualdez	Lakas	3	Majority
2nd	Lolita T. Javier	NPC	3	Majority
3rd	Anna Victoria V. Tuazon	NUP	2	Majority
4th	Richard I. Gomez, DPA	PFP	2	Majority
5th	Carl Nicolas C. Cari	Lakas	3	Majority

=== Official provincial seal ===

The upper portion is a perspective of the national Freedom Park commemorating the landing of General Douglas MacArthur and the American Liberation Forces in Leyte during World War II. The white cross represents the 2nd phase of Leyte's development when Magellan stopped here on his way to Cebu. The alphabet on the cross argent is the ancient Visayan paleographic syllabary of the letter L which stands for Leyte. The stars around the inner circle symbolize the forty-one towns of Leyte and the everlasting flame symbolizes the soldiers who died during World War II.

== Economy ==
Poverty incidence of Leyte (%)

Source: Philippine Statistics Authority

The economy of Leyte is a mixed agriculture, fishing, industrial, energy and mining. Rice is farmed in the lowland plains areas specifically those around Tacloban, while coconut farming, is the main cash crop in upland and mountainous areas. Sugarcane plantation is no. 1 produce in Ormoc City. Since Leyte is an island province, fishing is a major source of livelihood among coastal residents.

The province is the site of the largest geothermal power plant in Asia, making it one of the resource-rich provinces of the Philippines. Excess energy of the numerous power plants in the geothermal valley that generate electricity is supplied to the national grid that adds to the energy demand in Luzon and Mindanao. Mining industry has started to pick up in the province with the exploration in MacArthur. The iron smelting in Isabel has been operational for more than 20 years since its inception.

=== Leyte ICT Park ===
The Leyte Information Communications Technology (ICT) Park is one of the economic zones approved by the Philippine Economic Zone Authority (PEZA). Located in Pawing, Palo, Leyte, the 6.8 facility hosts two business process outsourcing (BPO) companies, namely, the Expert Global Solutions (EGS) Company (formerly APAC Customer Services, Inc.) and ACUDATA, Inc. (a financial and data services BPO). However, EGS decided to fully close its operations after its facility was destroyed by Typhoon Haiyan in 2013.

Leyte is emerging to be an ICT-BPO Hub for Eastern Visayas.

== Transportation ==
Leyte is connected by air with its only commercial airport located in Tacloban City. Daniel Z. Romualdez Airport, which is one of the busiest airports in the Philippines, is served by three major airlines, Philippine Airlines, Cebu Pacific and AirAsia. Tacloban Airport primarily serves connecting flights from major Philippine cities (Manila and Cebu).

Philtranco, which has a bus stop in Tacloban and Ormoc, operates a route along Manila-Maharlika highway, passing through Allen, Northern Samar in Samar Island (via ferry boat) from Matnog, Sorsogon in Bicol region.

Commercial seaport is of vital importance. Major ports of the province are located at Ormoc City, in the south and Tacloban City, in the north. Small ports are also located in Palompon, San Isidro, Bato, Hilongos and Baybay.

== See also ==
- Manuel Artigas
- Ruy López de Villalobos
