= Isabel, Leyte =

Municipality in Leyte, Philippines

Isabel Quiot
- Municipality
- Municipality of Isabel
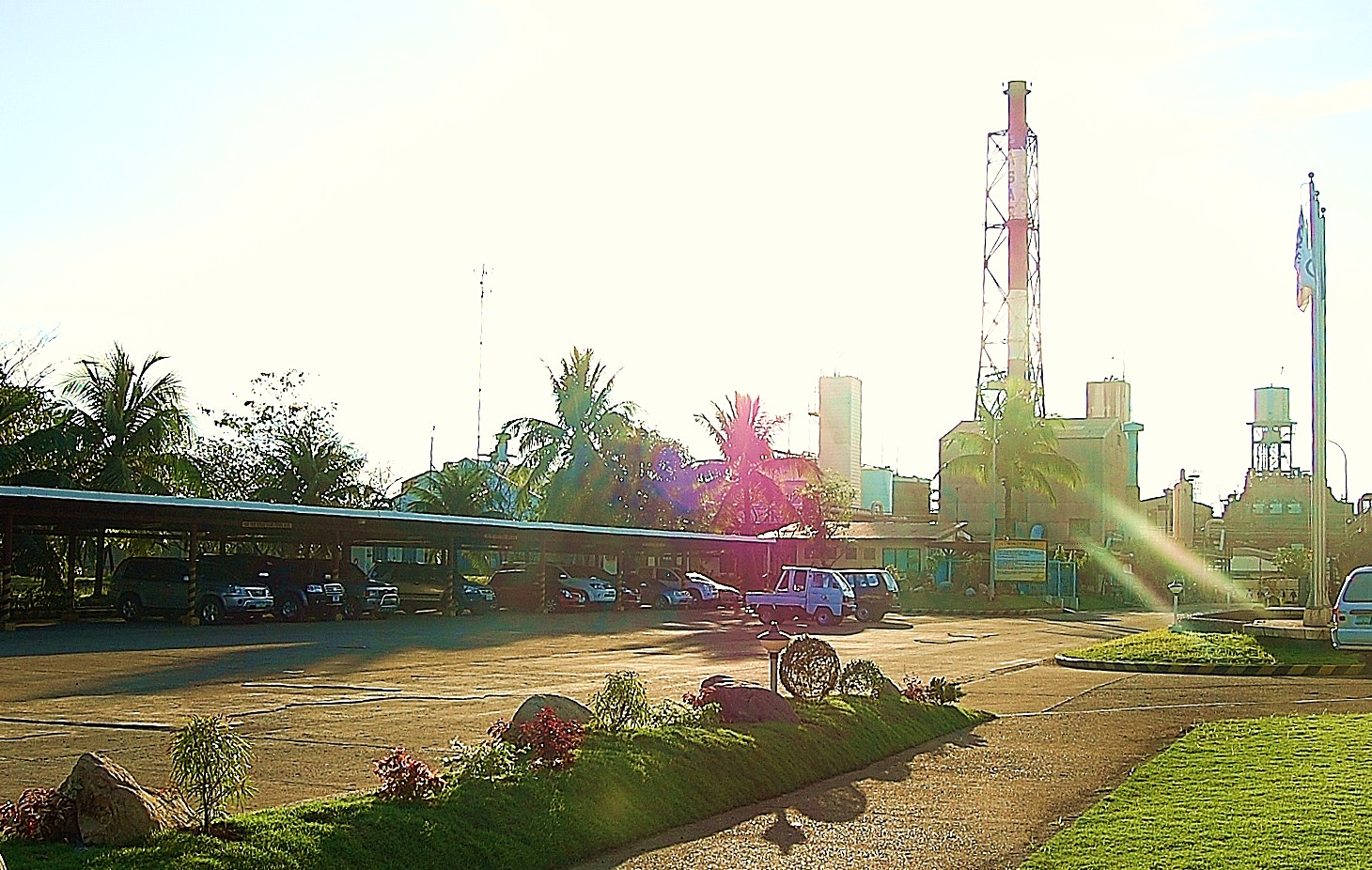
- Philippine Associated Smelting and Refining Corp.

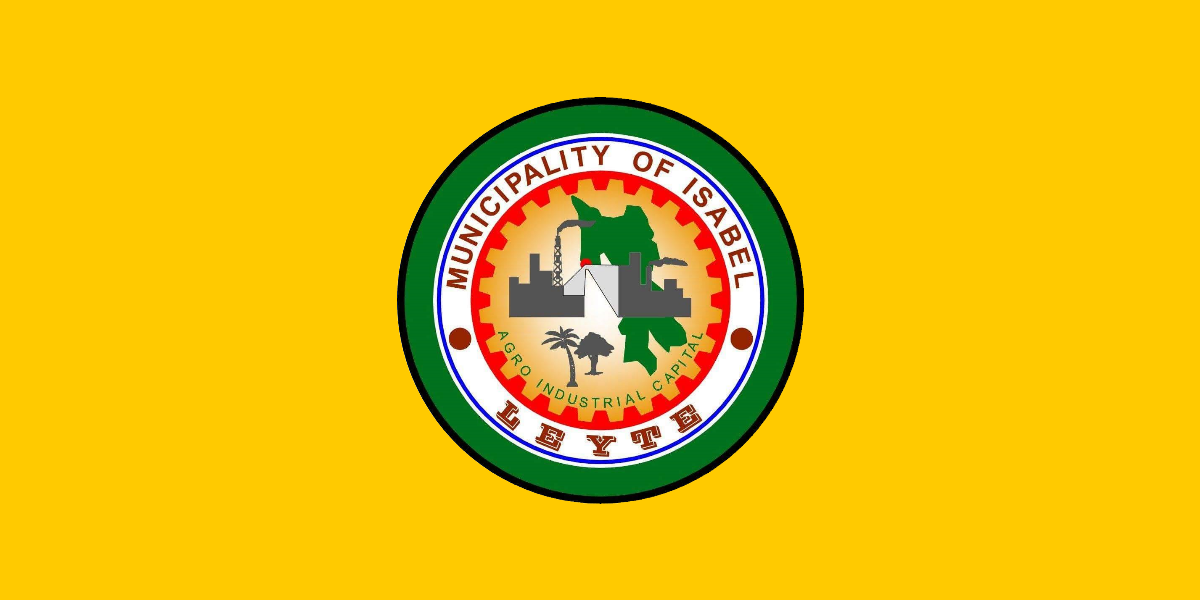
- Flag

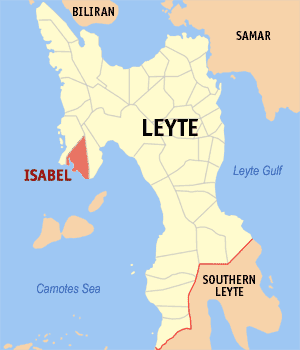
- Map of Leyte with Isabel highlighted
- Interactive map of Isabel
- Location within the Philippines
- Coordinates: 10°56′N 124°26′E
- Country: Philippines
- Region: Eastern Visayas
- Province: Leyte
- District: 4th district
- Founded: 15 January 1948
- Barangay: 24 (see Barangays)

Government
  - Type: Sangguniang Bayan
  - Mayor: Bennet Pongos
  - Vice Mayor: Adam Fuentes
  - Representative: Richard Gomez
  - Councilors: List: • Teddy E. Alemia; • Romel Mappala; • Bobet Rojas; • Deborah Bertulfo; • Alden Martin; • Manny Amodia; • Ailene J. Dearos; • Dan Tentativa; DILG Masterlist of Officials
  - Electorate: 34,770 voters (2025)

Area
  - Total: 64.01 km^{2} (24.71 sq mi)
- Elevation: 30 m (98 ft)
- Highest elevation: 573 m (1,880 ft)
- Lowest elevation: 0 m (0 ft)

Population (2024 census)
  - Total: 46,858
  - Density: 732.0/km^{2} (1,896/sq mi)
  - Households: 11,758

Economy
  - Income class: 1st municipal income class
  - Poverty incidence: 23.97% (2023)
  - Revenue: ₱ 247.7 million (2024)
  - Assets: ₱ 735.6 million (2024)
  - Expenditure: ₱ 238.4 million (2024)
  - Liabilities: ₱ 442.8 million (2024)

Service provider
  - Electricity: Leyte 5 Electric Cooperative (LEYECO 5)
- Time zone: UTC+8 (PST)
- ZIP code: 6539
- PSGC: 0803722000
- IDD : area code: +63 (0)53
- Native languages: Cebuano; Tagalog

Isabel (IPA: [ʔɪsɐ'bɛl]), officially the Municipality of Isabel (Cebuano: Lungsod sa Isabel; Waray: Bungto han Isabel; Tagalog: Bayan ng Isabel), is a municipality in the province of Leyte, Philippines. According to the 2024 census, it has a population of 46,858 people.

== History ==
The town was formally established and created by carving out the villages of Quiot, Santa Cruz, Libertad, Matlang, Tolingon, Bantigue, Apale and Honan from the town of Merida, by the passage of Republic Act No. 191.

== Geography ==
Isabel is bounded to the east by the municipality of Merida and to the north by the municipality of Palompon. Nearest landfall south is Ponson Island (Camotes) at about 7.2 kilometres (4.5 mi; 3.9 nmi). Nearest landfall west is coastal Tabogon, Cebu at about 50 kilometres (31 mi; 27 nmi).

=== Barangays ===
Isabel comprises 24 barangays. Each barangay consists of puroks and some have sitios.

- Anislag
- Antipolo
- Apale
- Bantigue
- Binog
- Bilwang
- Can-andan
- Cangag
- Consolacion
- Honan
- Libertad
- Mahayag
- Marvel (Poblacion)
- Matlang
- Monte Alegre
- Puting Bato
- San Francisco
- San Roque
- Santa Cruz Relocation
- Santo Niño (Poblacion)
- Santo Rosario
- Tabunok
- Tolingon
- Tubod

=== Climate ===
Climate data for Isabel, Leyte
Month	Jan	Feb	Mar	Apr	May	Jun	Jul	Aug	Sep	Oct	Nov	Dec	Year
Mean daily maximum °C (°F)	28 (82)	29 (84)	29 (84)	30 (86)	30 (86)	30 (86)	29 (84)	29 (84)	29 (84)	29 (84)	29 (84)	29 (84)	29 (84)
Mean daily minimum °C (°F)	22 (72)	22 (72)	22 (72)	23 (73)	25 (77)	25 (77)	25 (77)	25 (77)	25 (77)	24 (75)	24 (75)	23 (73)	24 (75)
Average precipitation mm (inches)	78 (3.1)	57 (2.2)	84 (3.3)	79 (3.1)	118 (4.6)	181 (7.1)	178 (7.0)	169 (6.7)	172 (6.8)	180 (7.1)	174 (6.9)	128 (5.0)	1,598 (62.9)
Average rainy days	16.7	13.8	17.3	18.5	23.2	26.5	27.1	26.0	26.4	27.5	24.6	21.0	268.6
Source: Meteoblue

== Demographics ==
Population census of Isabel

Year	Pop.	±% p.a.
1948	14,085	—
1960	14,633	+0.32%
1970	15,974	+0.88%
1975	15,327	−0.83%
1980	15,980	+0.84%
1990	33,389	+7.65%
1995	36,134	+1.49%

Year	Pop.	±% p.a.
2000	38,486	+1.36%
2007	40,214	+0.61%
2010	43,593	+2.98%
2015	46,915	+1.41%
2020	46,781	−0.06%
2024	46,858	+0.04%

Source: Philippine Statistics Authority

In the 2024 census, the population of Isabel was 46,858 people, with a density of 730 inhabitants per square kilometre or 1,900 inhabitants per square mile.

== Economy ==
Poverty incidence of Isabel (%)

Source: Philippine Statistics Authority

Leyte Industrial Development Estate (LIDE) is a 425 ha special economic zone in the industrial town of Isabel. It currently has 2 locators: PASAR(Philippine Associated Smelting & Refining Corporation) & PHILPHOS(Philippine Phosphate Fertilizer Corporation).

== Education ==
School
Visayas State University - Isabel Campus
LIDE Learning Center Inc.
Doane Baptist School of Isabel
Isabel National Comprehensive School
Isabel National High School
Holy Child Parish School of Isabel
Matlang National High School
Bilwang Elementary School
Bilwang National High School
Matlang Central School
St. Martin of Isabel Academy Inc.
St. Filomena National High School
Saint Augustine Parish School of Matlang Inc.
