= Kalanggaman Island =

Island near Leyte, Philippines

Coordinates: 11°06′53″N 124°15′03″E

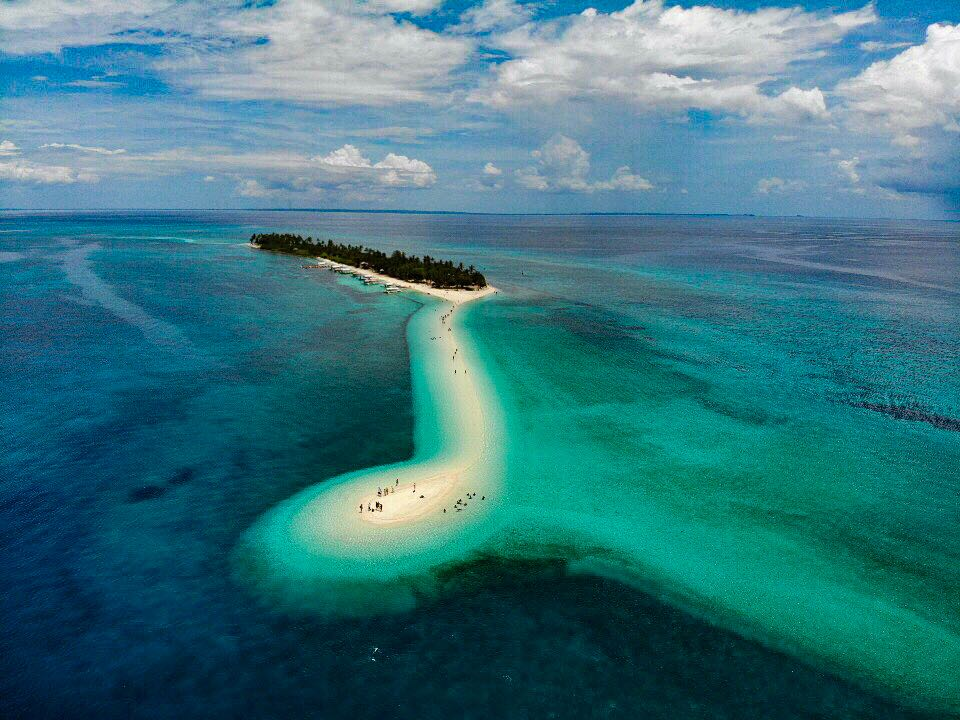
- Kalanggaman Island

Geography
- Type: Sandbar
- Archipelago: Visayas

Administration
- Philippines

Kalanggaman Island is a sandbar located in the sea between Leyte and Cebu, in the Visayas Archipelago of the Philippines. It is located 10 kilometres west from the municipality of Palompon, Leyte. It got its name from the local word "langgam" which means bird or fowl. It is said to look like a necked bird whenever sandbar forms. It is believed to have been a habitat for migratory bird long ago.

The island is an important breeding ground for the local ecosystem as well as a significant tourist attraction. The island is owned by the LGU Palompon.

== Geography ==
Kalanggaman Island is mostly flat, with a coastline marked by white sandy beaches. It's sandbar extends to the west of the island, the length of which changes depending on the season and the tide.

The island is 15,90 KM from the main land and has a length of 753m. Its width is averaged to be 71,8m and the total area is 5.4ha.

== Ecology ==
Kalanggaman Island serves as a breeding ground for sea turtles and manta rays. It is also home to diverse marine life due to the surrounding coral reefs, making it a popular spot for snorkeling and scuba diving.

In 2018, the Department of Environment and Natural Resources raised concerns about the volume of tourist traffic in Kalanggaman, due to the possible environmental impacts it could have on the island's natural habitats.

== Tourism ==
Kalanggaman Island has been recognized by Lonely Planet as one of the most picturesque islands in the Philippines.

== Infrastructure ==
The local government has implemented several facilities to cater to the influx of tourists, including restrooms, grilling stations, and cottages. However, the island still lacks electricity, encouraging visitors to bring their own power supplies.

In 2021, Typhoon Rai caused significant damage to the island's infrastructure, destroying many of the boats used for transportation to and from the island. Subsequently, the National Disaster Risk Reduction and Management Council of the Philippines published a detailed report on the damage to infrastructure and recovery efforts on the island.
