= Tabontabon =

Municipality in Leyte, Philippines

- Municipality
- Municipality of Tabontabon
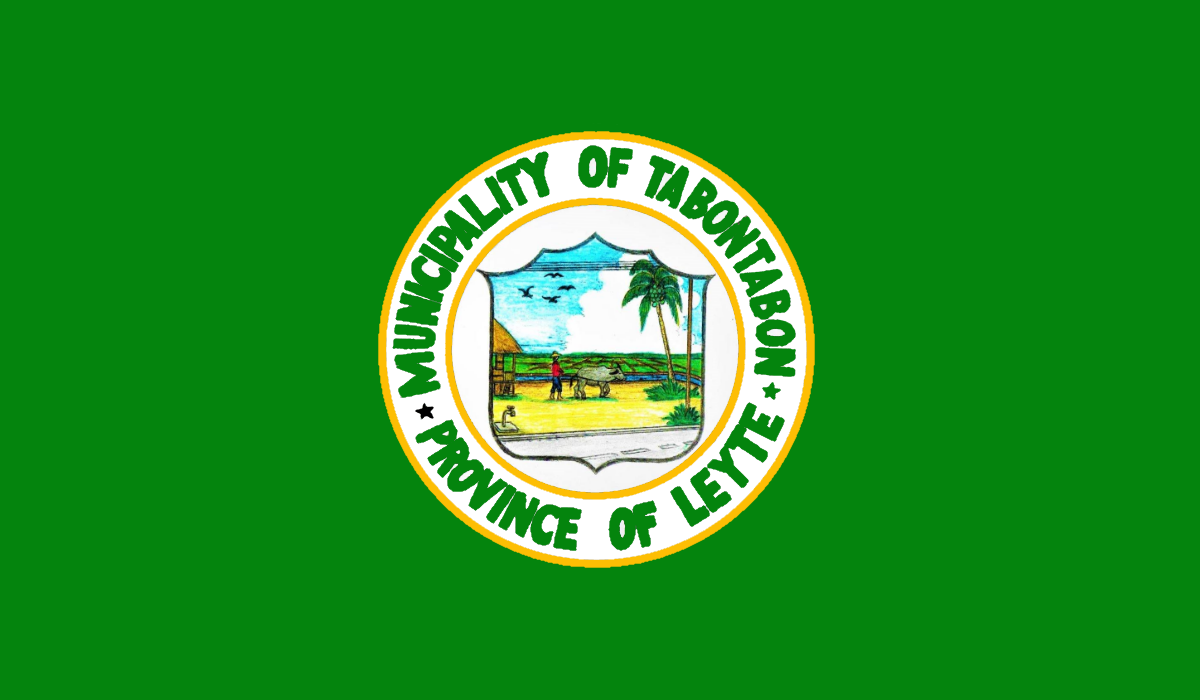
- Flag

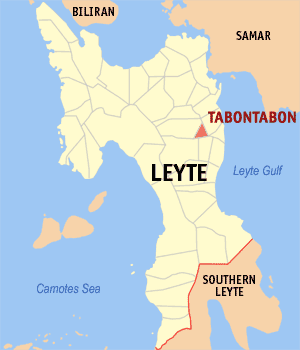
- Map of Leyte with Tabontabon highlighted
- Interactive map of Tabontabon
- Location within the Philippines
- Coordinates: 11°02′N 124°58′E
- Country: Philippines
- Region: Eastern Visayas
- Province: Leyte
- District: 2nd district
- Barangays: 16 (see Barangays)

Government
  - Type: Sangguniang Bayan
  - Mayor: Efren D. Redoña
  - Vice Mayor: Ponciano R. Justimbate Jr.
  - Representative: Lolita T. Javier
  - Councilors: List: • Leonardo G. Bibar; • Ma. Theresa Regina E. Ignacio; • Mervin M. Lobrigo; • Alejandrino S. Dolor; • Marie Nita A. Cervantes; • Edgardo E. Cinco; • Flocerfina A. Acala; • Danilo E. Balais; DILG Masterlist of Officials
  - Electorate: 10,294 voters (2025)

Area
  - Total: 24.18 km^{2} (9.34 sq mi)
- Elevation: 23 m (75 ft)
- Highest elevation: 58 m (190 ft)
- Lowest elevation: 7 m (23 ft)

Population (2024 census)
  - Total: 12,157
  - Density: 502.8/km^{2} (1,302/sq mi)
  - Households: 3,102

Economy
  - Income class: 5th municipal income class
  - Poverty incidence: 33.11% (2023)
  - Revenue: ₱ 85.91 million (2024)
  - Assets: ₱ 259.7 million (2024)
  - Expenditure: ₱ 102.6 million (2024)
  - Liabilities: ₱ 122.6 million (2024)

Service provider
  - Electricity: Don Orestes Romualdez Electric Coperative (DORELCO)
- Time zone: UTC+8 (PST)
- ZIP code: 6504
- PSGC: 0803746000
- IDD : area code: +63 (0)53
- Native languages: Waray; Tagalog

Tabontabon (IPA: [tɐbon'tabon]), officially the Municipality of Tabontabon (Waray: Bungto han Tabontabon; Tagalog: Bayan ng Tabontabon), is a municipality in the province of Leyte, Philippines. According to the 2024 census, it has a population of 12,157 people.

== History ==
On October 17, 1953, Executive Order numbered 631 by the President carved out 11 barangays to form Tabontabon from the municipalities of Tanauan and Dagami.

On June 20, 1957, Republic Act numbered 1649, transferred barangays Capahu-an and Guingawan from the town of Dagami to Tabontabon.

== Geography ==
=== Barangays ===
Tabontabon is politically subdivided into 16 barangays. Each barangay consists of puroks and some have sitios.

- Amandangay
- Aslum
- Balingasag
- Belisong
- Cambucao
- Capahuan
- District I Pob. (Quezon)
- District II Pob. (Rizal)
- District III Pob. (Bonifacio)
- District IV Pob. (McArthur)
- Guingauan
- Jabong
- Mercaduhay
- Mering
- Mohon
- San Pablo (Mooc)
- Sitio Gubat
- Sitio San Antonio

=== Climate ===
Climate data for Tabontabon, Leyte
Month	Jan	Feb	Mar	Apr	May	Jun	Jul	Aug	Sep	Oct	Nov	Dec	Year
Mean daily maximum °C (°F)	28 (82)	29 (84)	29 (84)	30 (86)	30 (86)	30 (86)	29 (84)	29 (84)	29 (84)	29 (84)	29 (84)	29 (84)	29 (84)
Mean daily minimum °C (°F)	22 (72)	22 (72)	22 (72)	23 (73)	25 (77)	25 (77)	25 (77)	25 (77)	25 (77)	24 (75)	24 (75)	23 (73)	24 (75)
Average precipitation mm (inches)	78 (3.1)	57 (2.2)	84 (3.3)	79 (3.1)	118 (4.6)	181 (7.1)	178 (7.0)	169 (6.7)	172 (6.8)	180 (7.1)	174 (6.9)	128 (5.0)	1,598 (62.9)
Average rainy days	16.7	13.8	17.3	18.5	23.2	26.5	27.1	26.0	26.4	27.5	24.6	21.0	268.6
Source: Meteoblue

== Economy ==
Poverty incidence of Tabontabon (%)

Source: Philippine Statistics Authority

== Demographics ==
Population census of Tabontabon

Year	Pop.	±% p.a.
1903	2,765	—
1960	5,522	+1.22%
1970	5,077	−0.84%
1975	6,250	+4.26%
1980	6,468	+0.69%
1990	7,183	+1.05%
1995	7,547	+0.93%

Year	Pop.	±% p.a.
2000	8,372	+2.25%
2007	9,518	+1.79%
2010	9,838	+1.21%
2015	11,204	+2.51%
2020	11,902	+1.28%
2024	12,157	+0.51%

Source: Philippine Statistics Authority

In the 2024 census, the population of Tabontabon was 12,157 people, with a density of 500 inhabitants per square kilometre or 1,300 inhabitants per square mile.

=== Language ===
Tabontabon is a 100% Waray-Waray speaking municipality.
