= Matag-ob =

Municipality in Leyte, Philippines

- Municipality
- Municipality of Matag-ob
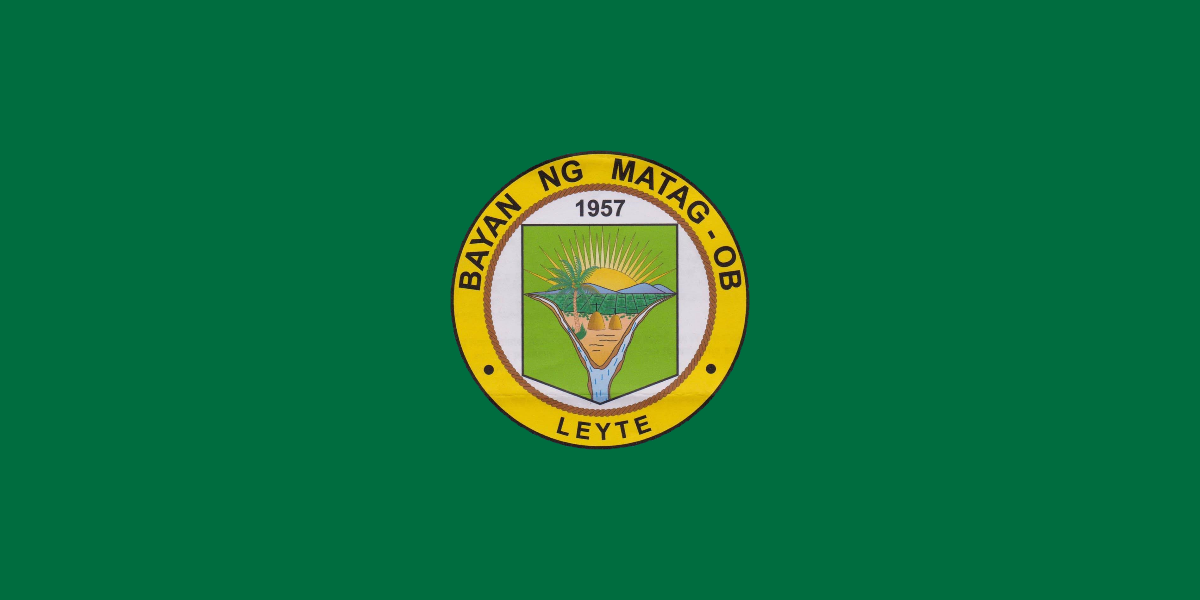
- Flag

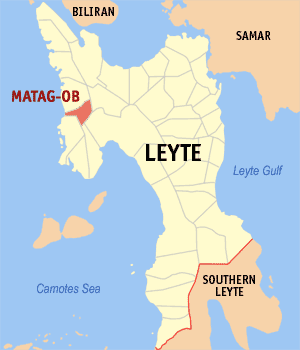
- Map of Leyte with Matag-ob highlighted
- Interactive map of Matag-ob
- Location within the Philippines
- Coordinates: 11°08′49″N 124°28′24″E
- Country: Philippines
- Region: Eastern Visayas
- Province: Leyte
- District: 4th district
- Barangays: 21 (see Barangays)

Government
  - Type: Sangguniang Bayan
  - Mayor: Bernandino G. Tacoy
  - Vice Mayor: Vincent Lynbern P. Tacoy
  - Representative: Richard Gomez
  - Councilors: List: • Romeo Albarida; • Artemio Almoroto; • Joel Denoy; • Evangeline Carno; • Eduardo Toledo; • Orlando Viacrusis; • Ricardo Giva; • Paolo Antonio Laurente; DILG Masterlist of Officials
  - Electorate: 14,749 voters (2025)

Area
  - Total: 104.40 km^{2} (40.31 sq mi)
- Elevation: 39 m (128 ft)
- Highest elevation: 573 m (1,880 ft)
- Lowest elevation: 0 m (0 ft)

Population (2024 census)
  - Total: 18,618
  - Density: 178.33/km^{2} (461.88/sq mi)
  - Households: 4,671

Economy
  - Income class: 4th municipal income class
  - Poverty incidence: 26.13% (2023)
  - Revenue: ₱ 125.8 million (2024)
  - Assets: ₱ 456.3 million (2024)
  - Expenditure: ₱ 141.6 million (2024)
  - Liabilities: ₱ 39.15 million (2024)

Service provider
  - Electricity: Leyte 5 Electric Cooperative (LEYECO 5)
- Time zone: UTC+8 (PST)
- ZIP code: 6532
- PSGC: 0803733000
- IDD : area code: +63 (0)53
- Native languages: Cebuano; Tagalog
- Website: www.matag-ob-leyte.gov.ph

Matag-ob (IPA: [mɐ'tagʔob]), officially the Municipality of Matag-ob (Cebuano: Lungsod sa Matag-ob; Waray: Bungto han Matag-ob; Tagalog: Bayan ng Matag-ob), is a municipality in the province of Leyte, Philippines. According to the 2024 census, it has a population of 18,618 people.

In 1957 the barrios of Santo Rosario, Santa Rosa, Balagtas, San Vicente and Mabini were separated from the municipality of Palompon and constituted into Matag-ob.

== Geography ==
=== Barangays ===
Matag-ob is politically subdivided into 21 barangays. Each barangay consists of puroks and some have sitios.

- Balagtas
- Bonoy
- Bulak
- Cambadbad
- Candelaria
- Cansoso
- Imelda
- Malazarte
- Mansaha-on
- Mansalip
- Masaba
- Naulayan
- Riverside (Poblacion)
- San Dionesio
- San Guillermo (Poblacion)
- San Marcelino
- San Sebastian
- San Vicente
- Santa Rosa
- Santo Rosario
- Talisay (Poblacion)

=== Climate ===
Climate data for Matag-ob, Leyte
Month	Jan	Feb	Mar	Apr	May	Jun	Jul	Aug	Sep	Oct	Nov	Dec	Year
Mean daily maximum °C (°F)	26 (79)	27 (81)	27 (81)	28 (82)	28 (82)	28 (82)	27 (81)	28 (82)	27 (81)	27 (81)	27 (81)	27 (81)	27 (81)
Mean daily minimum °C (°F)	21 (70)	20 (68)	21 (70)	22 (72)	23 (73)	23 (73)	23 (73)	23 (73)	23 (73)	23 (73)	22 (72)	21 (70)	22 (72)
Average precipitation mm (inches)	78 (3.1)	57 (2.2)	84 (3.3)	79 (3.1)	118 (4.6)	181 (7.1)	178 (7.0)	169 (6.7)	172 (6.8)	180 (7.1)	174 (6.9)	128 (5.0)	1,598 (62.9)
Average rainy days	16.7	13.8	17.3	18.5	23.2	26.5	27.1	26.0	26.4	27.5	24.6	21.0	268.6
Source: Meteoblue

== Demographics ==
Population census of Matag-ob

Year	Pop.	±% p.a.
1960	9,226	—
1970	9,474	+0.27%
1975	11,970	+4.80%
1980	16,401	+6.50%
1990	15,474	−0.58%
1995	17,333	+2.15%

Year	Pop.	±% p.a.
2000	17,527	+0.24%
2007	16,764	−0.61%
2010	17,089	+0.70%
2015	18,373	+1.39%
2020	17,522	−0.99%
2024	18,618	+1.47%

Source: Philippine Statistics Authority

In the 2024 census, the population of Matag-ob was 18,618 people, with a density of 180 inhabitants per square kilometre or 470 inhabitants per square mile.

== Economy ==
Poverty incidence of Matag-ob (%)

Source: Philippine Statistics Authority

== Government ==
2025-2028 Matag-ob, Leyte Officials
Position	Name	Party	Start of term	End of term	Term
Mayor	Bernardino G. Tacoy	NUP	June 30, 2022	June 30, 2028	2
Vice Mayor	Romeo N. Albarida	NUP	June 30, 2025	June 30, 2028	1
Councilors	Artemio T. Almoroto	NUP	June 30, 2022	June 30, 2028	2
Councilors	Joel N. Denoy	NUP	June 30, 2022	June 30, 2028	2
Councilors	Evangeline C. Carno	NUP	June 30, 2022	June 30, 2028	2
Councilors	Ricardo L. Giva	NUP	June 30, 2022	June 30, 2028	2
Councilors	Rodolfo N. Suñir	NUP	June 30, 2025	June 30, 2028	1
Councilors	Luz M. Boldero	NUP	June 30, 2025	June 30, 2028	1
Councilors	Jose B. Yap	NUP	June 30, 2025	June 30, 2028	1
Councilors	Eduardo I. Toledo	NUP	June 30, 2022	June 30, 2028	2
Ex Officio Municipal Council Members
ABC President	TBD	Nonpartisan		January 1, 2027	1
SK Federation President	TBD	Nonpartisan		January 1, 2027	1
