= Babatngon =

Municipality in Leyte, Philippines

- Municipality
- Municipality of Babatngon
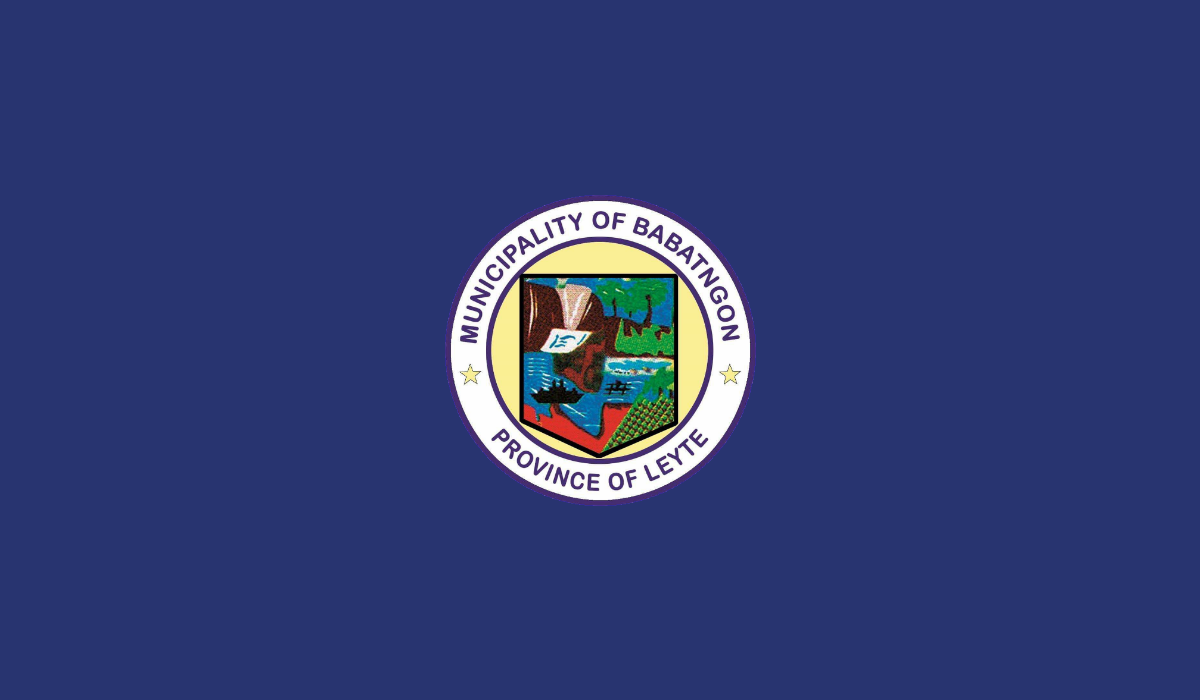
- Flag

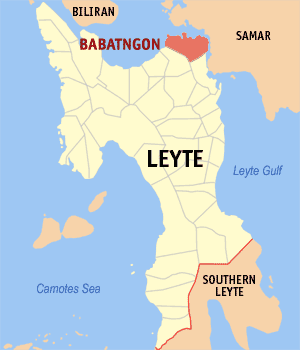
- Map of Leyte with Babatngon highlighted
- Interactive map of Babatngon
- Location within the Philippines
- Coordinates: 11°25′15″N 124°50′36″E
- Country: Philippines
- Region: Eastern Visayas
- Province: Leyte
- District: 1st district
- Barangays: 25 (see Barangays)

Government
  - Type: Sangguniang Bayan
  - Mayor: Eleonor Bobares Lugnasin
  - Vice Mayor: Rosary Pearl G. Catudio (Lakas-CMD)
  - Representative: Ferdinand Martin G. Romualdez
  - Councilors: Kemuel Rue M. Corsiga; Christian C. Lawsin; Ma. Restita D. Dante; Hilarion S. Menzon; Chona Rose B. Lugnasin; Federico P. Elizaga; Alex V. Bello; Ildefonso B. Odon
  - Electorate: 20,897 voters (2025)

Area
  - Total: 115.18 km^{2} (44.47 sq mi)
- Elevation: 35 m (115 ft)
- Highest elevation: 579 m (1,900 ft)
- Lowest elevation: 0 m (0 ft)

Population (2024 census)
  - Total: 29,587
  - Density: 256.88/km^{2} (665.31/sq mi)
  - Households: 6,936

Economy
  - Income class: 3rd municipal income class
  - Poverty incidence: 33.99% (2023)
  - Revenue: ₱ 162.2 million (2024)
  - Assets: ₱ 458.2 million (2024)
  - Expenditure: ₱ 144.9 million (2024)
  - Liabilities: ₱ 104.1 million (2024)

Service provider
  - Electricity: Leyte 2 Electric Cooperative (LEYECO 2)
- Time zone: UTC+8 (PST)
- ZIP code: 6520
- PSGC: 0803705000
- IDD : area code: +63 (0)53
- Native languages: Waray; Tagalog
- Website: www.babatngon-leyte.gov.ph

Babatngon (IPA: [bɐbɐt'ŋon]), officially the Municipality of Babatngon (Waray: Bungto han Babatngon; Tagalog: Bayan ng Babatngon), is a municipality in the province of Leyte, Philippines. According to the 2020 census, it has a population of 28,823 people.

== Etymology ==
The place got its name from the word batong, a large trap made of abaca fibers used for hunting by the early Boholano settlers. Later on named as "Babatngon," which means hunting ground with the use of a net.

== Geography ==
Babatngon is located in the northern part of the island of Leyte, along the shore of Carigara Bay. It is situated on a small plain set in a semicircle of mountain ranges and nestles in the northern mouth of the San Juanico Strait, which separates Samar from Leyte. Boats coming in or going out of Tacloban have to pass by it through the pilot station of Canaway, one of the islets along the strait. It is 33 kilometres (21 mi) north-west of Tacloban and about 10 kilometres (6.2 mi) north of the town of San Miguel. Small coconut covered islets fringe its coast along San Juanico Strait, the most important of which are Rizal, Magsaigad, Tabigue, almost all of which extend from east to west.

=== Barangays ===
Babatngon is politically subdivided into 25 barangays. Each barangay consists of puroks and some have sitios.

In 1957, sitios Biasong, Lube, Ubayan, Calcagan, Cancamaoy, and Opong were constituted into barrio Biasong while sitio Nababoy was converted into barrio San Ricardo.

- Bacong
- Bagong Silang
- Biasong
- Guintigui-an
- Gov. E. Jaro (Bagahupi)
- Lukay
- Malibago
- Magcasuang
- Naga-asan
- Pagsulhugon
- Planza
- Poblacion District I
- Poblacion District II
- Poblacion District III
- Poblacion District IV
- Rizal I
- Rizal II
- San Agustin
- San Isidro
- San Ricardo
- Sangputan
- Taguite
- Uban
- Victory
- Villa Magsaysay

=== Climate ===
Climate data for Babatngon, Leyte
Month	Jan	Feb	Mar	Apr	May	Jun	Jul	Aug	Sep	Oct	Nov	Dec	Year
Mean daily maximum °C (°F)	28 (82)	29 (84)	29 (84)	31 (88)	31 (88)	30 (86)	30 (86)	30 (86)	30 (86)	29 (84)	29 (84)	29 (84)	30 (85)
Mean daily minimum °C (°F)	22 (72)	22 (72)	22 (72)	23 (73)	24 (75)	25 (77)	25 (77)	25 (77)	25 (77)	24 (75)	24 (75)	23 (73)	24 (75)
Average precipitation mm (inches)	73 (2.9)	56 (2.2)	75 (3.0)	71 (2.8)	114 (4.5)	174 (6.9)	172 (6.8)	163 (6.4)	167 (6.6)	161 (6.3)	158 (6.2)	125 (4.9)	1,509 (59.5)
Average rainy days	15.2	12.5	16.2	17.3	23.9	27.3	28.4	26.9	26.9	27.1	23.8	19.3	264.8
Source: Meteoblue

== Demographics ==
Population census of Babatngon
Year	Pop.	±% p.a.
1903	5,159	—
1918	4,716	−0.60%
1939	8,000	+2.55%
1948	9,992	+2.50%
1960	11,476	+1.16%
1970	14,927	+2.66%
1975	16,316	+1.80%
1980	16,449	+0.16%
1990	17,400	+0.56%
1995	19,653	+2.31%
2000	20,946	+1.38%
2007	24,067	+1.93%
2010	25,575	+2.24%
2015	27,797	+1.60%
2020	28,823	+0.77%
2024	29,587	+0.63%
Source: Philippine Statistics Authority

In the 2024 census, the population of Babatngon was 29,587 people, with a density of 260 inhabitants per square kilometre or 670 inhabitants per square mile.

== Economy ==
Poverty incidence of Babatngon

Source: Philippine Statistics Authority

== Elected Officials ==
2025-2028 Babatngon, Leyte Officials
Position	Name	Party
Mayor	Eleonor B. Lugnasin	NPC
Vice Mayor	Rosary Pearl G. Catudio	Lakas
Councilors	Kemuel Rue M. Corsiga	NPC
Councilors	Christian C. Lawsin	NPC
Councilors	Ma. Restita D. Dante	NPC
Councilors	Hilarion S. Menzon	NPC
Councilors	Chona Rose B. Lugnasin	Lakas
Councilors	Federico P. Elizaga	Lakas
Councilors	Alex V. Bello	Tingog
Councilors	Ildefonso B. Odon	Tingog
Ex Officio Municipal Council Members
ABC President	Edgar Y. Morden	Nonpartisan
SK Federation President	Jude Lemuel Vethimvas	Nonpartisan

== Tourism ==
Babatngon is known for Busay Falls, a three-tiered cataract which is an attraction for picnickers who flock to Babatngon during the summer months. A massive bowl of solid, moss-covered rock catches the cool waters of the third fall.

== Infrastructure ==
There are 11 barrios linked to the town proper with "vecinal" roads. These are provided with artesian wells. Barrio Bagahupi has been made a pilot barrio in the study of schistosomiasis as the area has been suspected of being positive for the parasite.

Although some of the buildings burned down during the war have not been reconstructed, several pre-fabricated buildings have taken care of the needs of the children.
