= San Miguel, Leyte =

Municipality in Leyte, Philippines

San Miguel
- Municipality
- Municipality of San Miguel
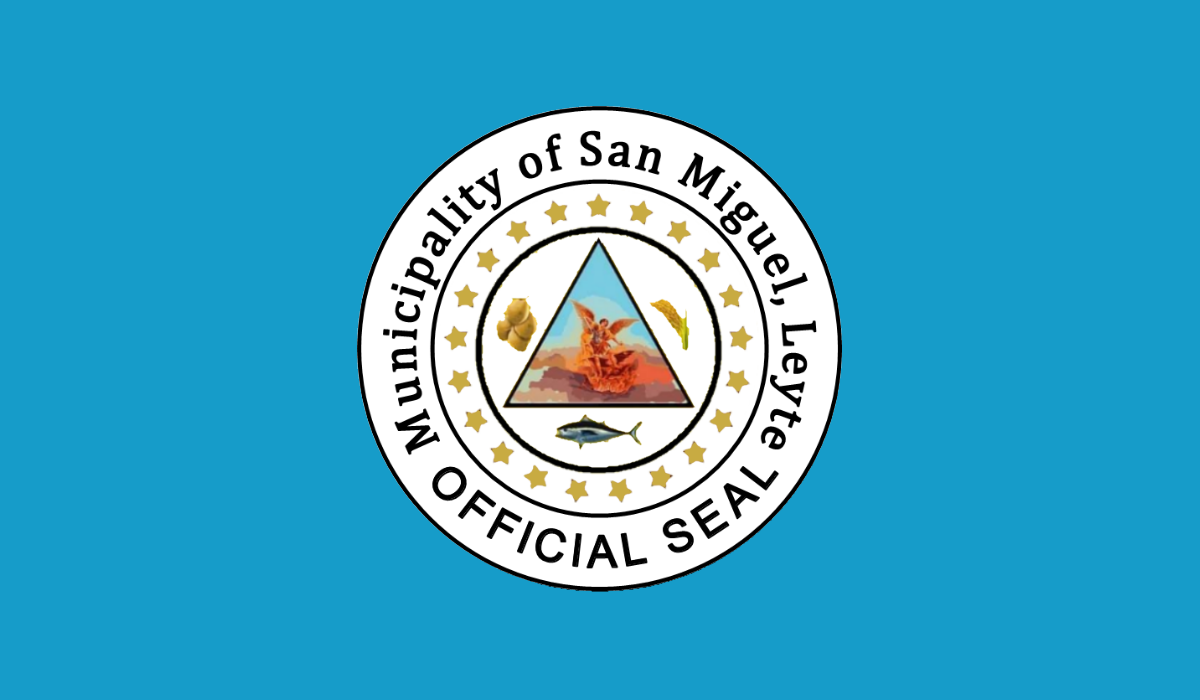
- Flag

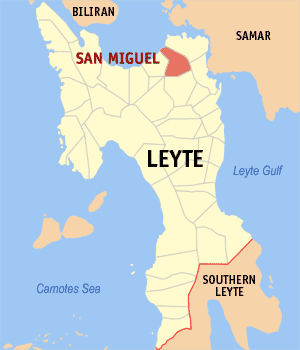
- Map of Leyte with San Miguel highlighted
- Interactive map of San Miguel
- Location within the Philippines
- Coordinates: 11°17′39″N 124°49′48″E
- Country: Philippines
- Region: Eastern Visayas
- Province: Leyte
- District: 1st district
- Barangays: 21 (see Barangays)

Government
  - Type: Sangguniang Bayan
  - Mayor: Atty. Norman D. Sabdao (Lakas-CMD)
  - Vice Mayor: Estanislao D. Sabdao Jr. (Lakas-CMD)
  - Representative: Ferdinand Martin G. Romualdez (Lakas-CMD)
  - Councilors: List: • Jerome P. Peñaranda; • Danilo L. Aureo; • Norman Niel G. Martija; • Letecia G. Espos; • Francis Jay D. Sabdao; • Thelma M. Brazil; • Raul A. Salaño; • Richard Len B. Lapidario; DILG Masterlist of Officials
  - Electorate: 15,666 voters (2025)

Area
  - Total: 145.11 km^{2} (56.03 sq mi)
- Elevation: 59 m (194 ft)
- Highest elevation: 1,231 m (4,039 ft)
- Lowest elevation: 0 m (0 ft)

Population (2024 census)
  - Total: 20,322
  - Density: 140.05/km^{2} (362.72/sq mi)
  - Households: 4,677

Economy
  - Income class: 3rd municipal income class
  - Poverty incidence: 33.98% (2023)
  - Revenue: ₱ 144.5 million (2024)
  - Assets: ₱ 713.3 million (2024)
  - Expenditure: ₱ 123.9 million (2024)
  - Liabilities: ₱ 377.3 million (2024)

Service provider
  - Electricity: Leyte 3 Electric Cooperative (LEYECO 3)
- Time zone: UTC+8 (PST)
- ZIP code: 6518
- PSGC: 0803743000
- IDD : area code: +63 (0)53
- Native languages: Waray; Tagalog
- Website: www.sanmiguel-leyte.gov.ph

San Miguel (IPA: [sɐn mɪˈɡɛl]), officially the Municipality of San Miguel (Waray: Bungto han San Miguel; Tagalog: Bayan ng San Miguel), is a municipality in the province of Leyte, Philippines. According to the 2024 census, it has a population of 20,322 people.

On November 30, 2018, a two-day music & arts festival was held in Guinciaman farm. The "For the Love of Leyte" included local bands, such as Ben&Ben and Itchyworms, and international musicians alongside an immersive program of music, art, and workshops. The movement was to light the talents of the region, both during the music festival and through the long-term initiatives on the island.

== History ==
According to the manuscript written by Lorenzo Babula, one of the old town executives of this municipality, the first people were only few then so their homes were scattered in the forests where they tilled land for subsistence. Later, some settled along the seashore and they fished for food and as a means of livelihood. As time went on, many of them lived in a place called "Sabang" which means mouth of the river then later it became a small barrio. This was the period when the "Moros" from Jolo who were pirates forced women to go with them to Mindanao so they could be sold to their "datu" or ruler as cooks or laundrywomen.

As time went on, many of them lived in a place called "Sabang" which means mouth of the river then later it became a small barrio. This was the period when the "Moros" from Jolo who were pirates forced women to go with them to Mindanao so they could be sold to their "datu" or ruler as cooks or laundrywomen.

=== Consolidation to Alangalang ===
In 1903, San Miguel was consolidated to Alangalang and thus became its barangay but was subsequently reversed by the Governor General in 1909 through Executive Order 81.

=== World War II ===
On 27 October 1944, American and Filipino forces captured San Miguel from the 14th Area Army of the Imperial Japanese Army under the command of Tomoyuki Yamashita. They proceeded to advance towards Barugo on their way towards the main headquarters at Carigara.

== Geography ==
=== Barangays ===
San Miguel is politically subdivided into 21 barangays. Each barangay consists of puroks and some have sitios.

- Bagacay
- Bahay
- Bairan
- Cabatianuhan
- Canap
- Capilihan
- Caraycaray
- Libtong (East Poblacion)
- Guinciaman
- Impo
- Kinalumsan
- Lukay
- Malaguinabot
- Malpag
- Mawodpawod
- Patong
- Pinarigusan
- San Andres
- Santa Cruz
- Santol
- Cayare (West Poblacion)

=== Climate ===
Climate data for San Miguel, Leyte
Month	Jan	Feb	Mar	Apr	May	Jun	Jul	Aug	Sep	Oct	Nov	Dec	Year
Mean daily maximum °C (°F)	28 (82)	29 (84)	29 (84)	31 (88)	31 (88)	30 (86)	30 (86)	30 (86)	30 (86)	29 (84)	29 (84)	29 (84)	30 (85)
Mean daily minimum °C (°F)	22 (72)	22 (72)	22 (72)	23 (73)	24 (75)	25 (77)	25 (77)	25 (77)	25 (77)	24 (75)	24 (75)	23 (73)	24 (75)
Average precipitation mm (inches)	73 (2.9)	56 (2.2)	75 (3.0)	71 (2.8)	114 (4.5)	174 (6.9)	172 (6.8)	163 (6.4)	167 (6.6)	161 (6.3)	158 (6.2)	125 (4.9)	1,509 (59.5)
Average rainy days	15.2	12.5	16.2	17.3	23.9	27.3	28.4	26.9	26.9	27.1	23.8	19.3	264.8
Source: Meteoblue

== Demographics ==
Population census of San Miguel

Year	Pop.	±% p.a.
1903	3,721	—
1918	5,260	+2.33%
1939	7,765	+1.87%
1948	7,656	−0.16%
1960	9,917	+2.18%
1970	9,321	−0.62%
1975	12,134	+5.43%
1980	11,729	−0.68%

Year	Pop.	±% p.a.
1990	13,438	+1.37%
1995	14,504	+1.44%
2000	15,153	+0.94%
2007	16,527	+1.20%
2010	17,561	+2.23%
2015	19,420	+1.93%
2020	19,753	+0.36%
2024	20,322	+0.68%

Source: Philippine Statistics Authority

In the 2024 census, the population of San Miguel was 20,322 people, with a density of 140 inhabitants per square kilometre or 360 inhabitants per square mile.

== Economy ==
Poverty incidence of San Miguel (%)

Source: Philippine Statistics Authority

== Elected Officials ==
2025-2028 San Miguel, Leyte Officials
Position	Name	Party
Mayor	Norman D. Sabdao	Lakas
Vice Mayor	Estanislao D. Sabdao Jr.	Lakas
Councilors	Jerome P. Peñaranda	Liberal
Councilors	Danilo L. Aureo	Tingog
Councilors	Norman Niel G. Martija	Tingog
Councilors	Letecia G. Espos	Lakas
Councilors	Francis Jay D. Sabdao	Lakas
Councilors	Thelma M. Brazil	Lakas
Councilors	Raul A. Salaño	NPC
Councilors	Richard Len B. Lapidario	Independent
Ex Officio Municipal Council Members
ABC President	Samuel P. Salomon (Guinciaman)	Nonpartisan
SK Federation President	Joss Novem B. Labaclado (Libtong)	Nonpartisan
Barangay Chairpersons
Bagacay	Melcon V. Viador	
Bahay	Jessie E. Asis	
Bairan	Gavino T. Valleramos	
Cabatianuhan	Erwin L. Valeriano	
Canap	Norita L. Acebo	
Capilihan	Wenceslao E. Blones	
Caraycaray	Eric C. Lisigues	
Libtong (East Poblacion)	Jose Martin V. Calamaya	
Guinciaman	Samuel P. Salomon	
Impo	Sonia A. Biaco	
Kinalumsan	Marlene B. Supatan	
Lukay	Daniel S. Narrido	
Malaguinabot	Ryan C. Cajudo	
Malpag	Benecio P. Aruta	
Mawodpawod	Leonardo T. Cardona	
Patong	Jovita L. Reboso	
Pinarigusan	Joemer R. Lego	
San Andres	Emma P. Brun	
Santa Cruz	Manuel S. Dominguez	
Santol	Roselda A. Elbore	
Cayare (West Poblacion)	Alfred C. Tabalanza Jr.	
