= Palompon =

Municipality in Leyte, Philippines

- Municipality
- Municipality of Palompon
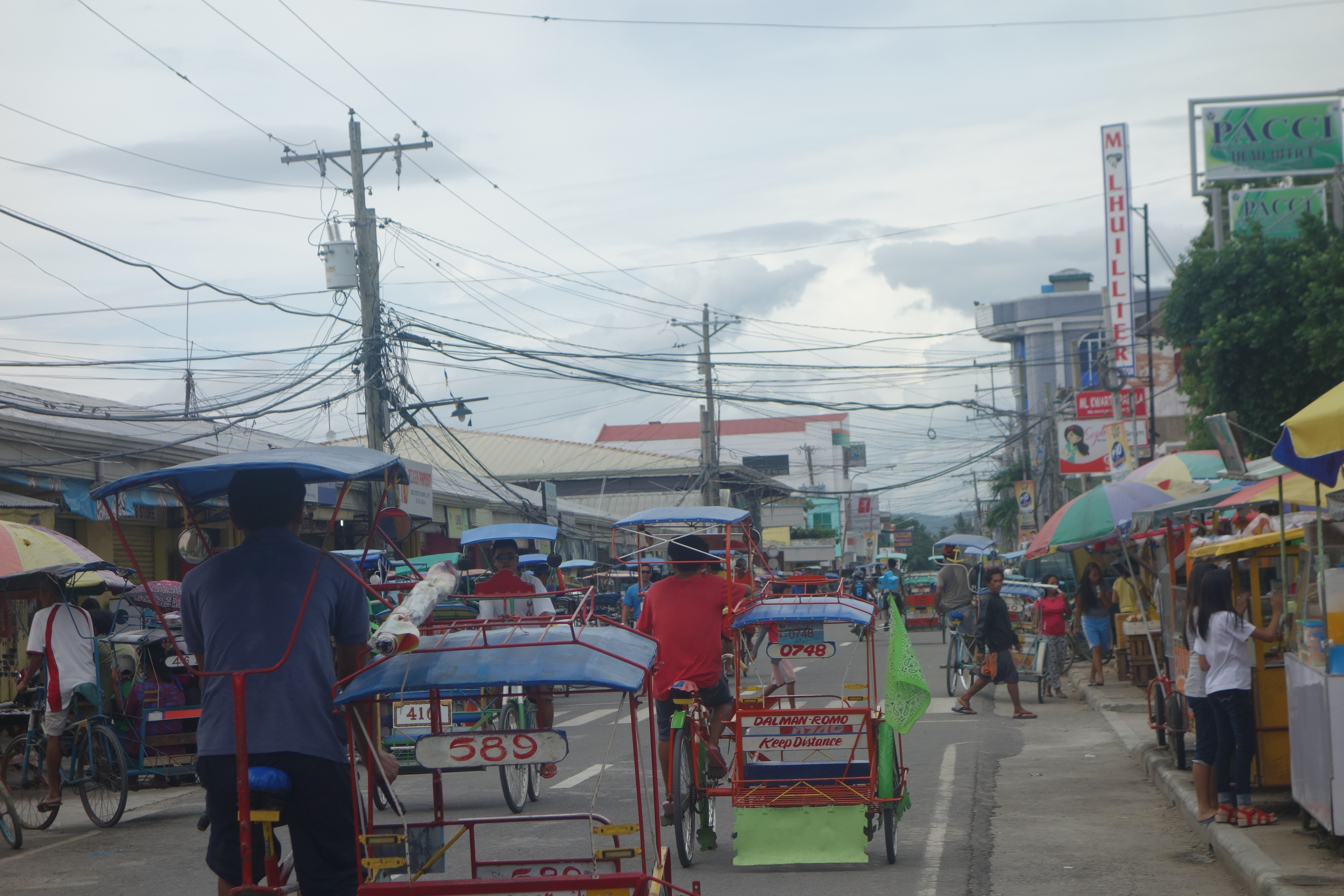

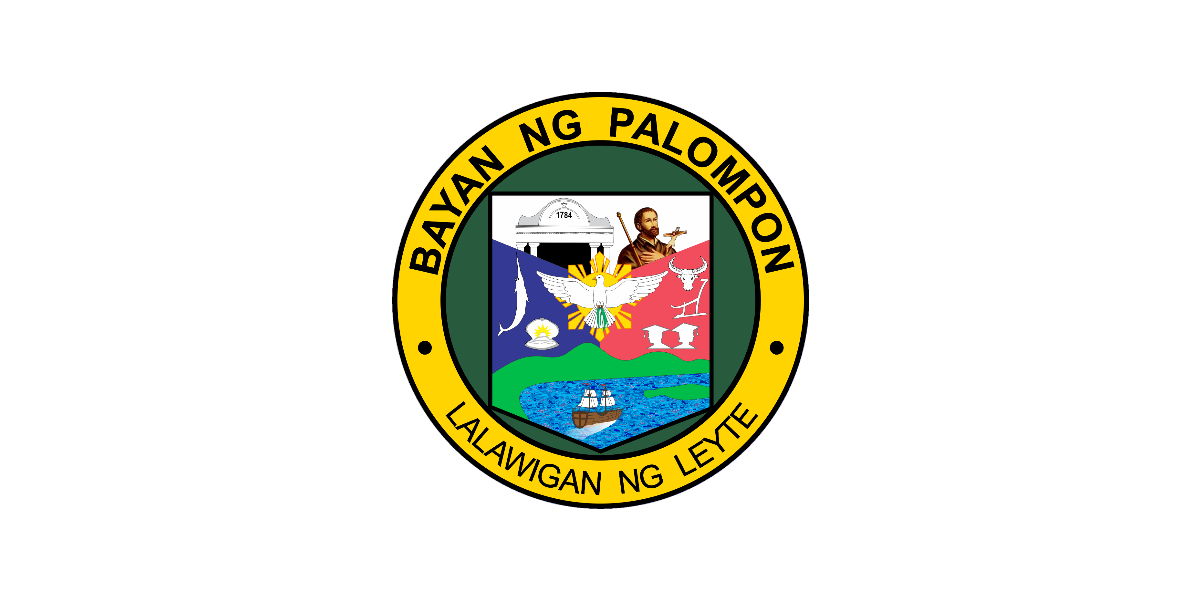
- Flag

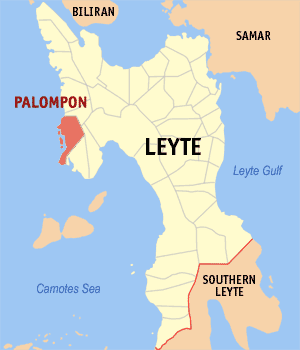
- Map of Leyte with Palompon highlighted
- Interactive map of Palompon
- Location within the Philippines
- Coordinates: 11°02′52″N 124°22′57″E
- Country: Philippines
- Region: Eastern Visayas
- Province: Leyte
- District: 4th district
- Founded: 1620
- Barangays: 50 (see Barangays)

Government
  - Type: Sangguniang Bayan
  - Mayor: Mary Dominique A. Oñate (PRP)
  - Vice Mayor: Javes Keith R. Dela Calzada (PRP)
  - Representative: Richard I. Gomez (PFP)
  - Councilors: List: • Burt Mari M. Bregaudit; • Edgar P. Pacaldo; • William O. Balasabas; • Vanessa N. Avenido; • Marivic E. Patalinghug; • Antonio R. Salazar; • Leonardo C. Quiamco Jr.; • Edilberto R. Longcanaya; DILG Masterlist of Officials
  - Electorate: 46,764 voters (2025)

Area
  - Total: 126.07 km^{2} (48.68 sq mi)
- Elevation: 4.9 m (16 ft)
- Highest elevation: 535 m (1,755 ft)
- Lowest elevation: 0 m (0 ft)

Population (2024 census)
  - Total: 59,486
  - Density: 471.85/km^{2} (1,222.1/sq mi)
  - Households: 14,969
- Demonym: Palomponganon

Economy
  - Income class: 1st municipal income class
  - Poverty incidence: 24.34% (2023)
  - Revenue: ₱ 302.2 million (2024)
  - Assets: ₱ 1,172 million (2024)
  - Expenditure: ₱ 218.7 million (2024)
  - Liabilities: ₱ 295.9 million (2024)

Service provider
  - Electricity: Leyte 5 Electric Cooperative (LEYECO 5)
- Time zone: UTC+8 (PST)
- ZIP code: 6538
- PSGC: 0803740000
- IDD : area code: +63 (0)53
- Native languages: Cebuano

Palompon (IPA: [pɐ'lompɔn]), officially the Municipality of Palompon (Cebuano: Lungsod sa Palompon; Waray: Bungto han Palompon; Tagalog: Bayan ng Palompon), is a municipality in the province of Leyte, Philippines. According to the 2024 census, it has a population of 59,486 people.

== History ==
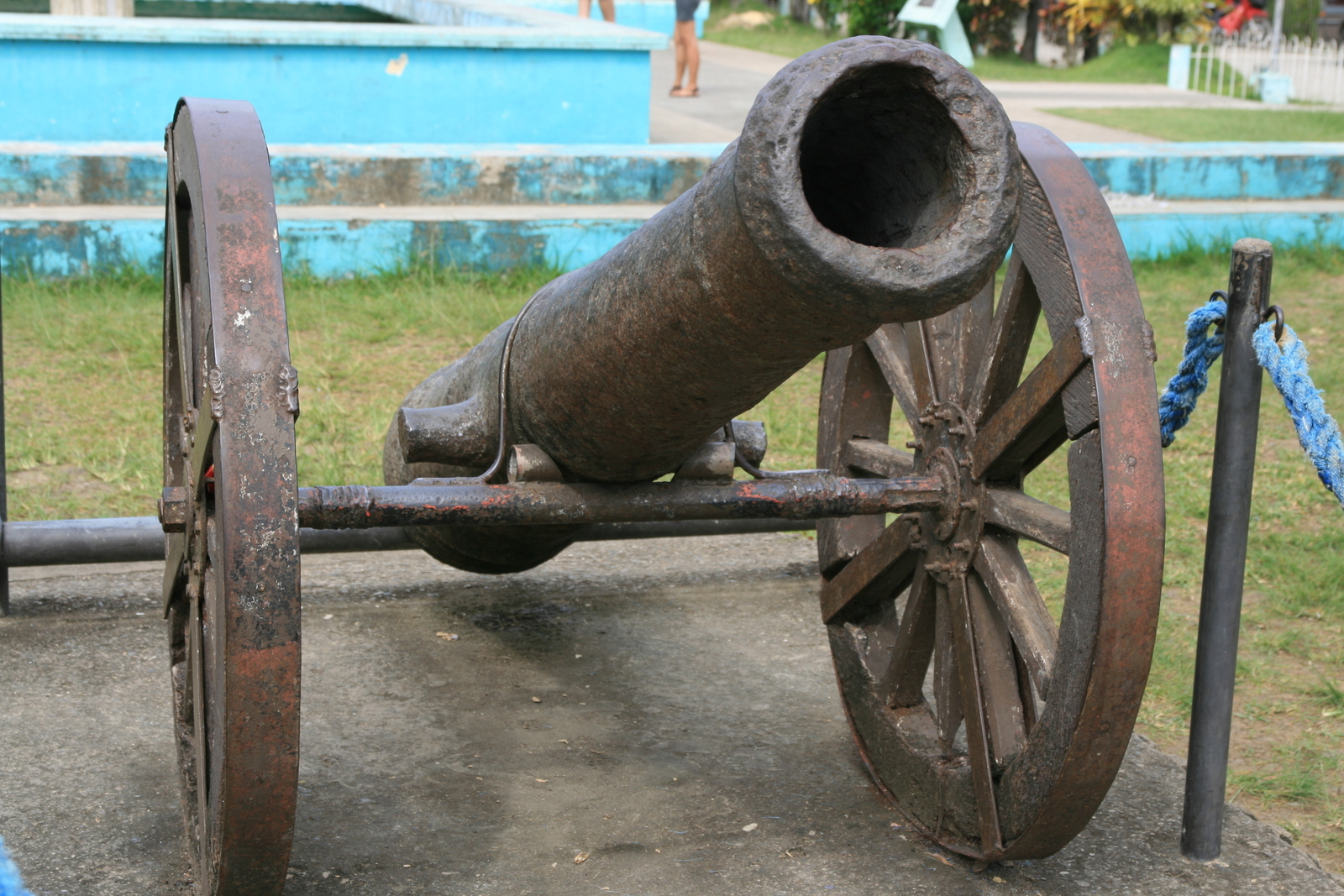
Old cannon of Palompon

Along the strip of the fertile coast, the community was founded circa 1620 and originally named Hinablayan. Fish, sea shells, and other marine products abounded. People fished along the shore with arrows tied to vines. Its abundance attracted not only migrants but also Moro raiders from the south. Legend tells that local defenders used to hang the dead bodies of Moros on tree branches so that the place come to be known as Hinablayan (from the word sablay which means "to hang").

The legend continues that when the Spaniards came they saw floating at the bay a cluster (pong pong) of mangrove propagules locally known as "Tungki", they decided to change the name of Hinablayan to Paungpung, after the cluster of mangrove propagules to erase the bloody memory of the Moro raiders. Gradually the name evolved to Palompong as seen in the first Murillo-Velarde Map published in 1734, then to Palumpun, and its current spelling of Palompon sometime in 1700 or 1800. It is said that cluster later got stuck to the shoal until they grew up as trees, forming an islet which is Tabuk Island today.

In 1737, Jesuit missionaries arrived and built the first chapel which was later burned during a Moro raid. It was rebuilt and, as a refuge from attack, the chapel was enclosed with piled stones, with a "cota" along the frontage. When the people saw Moro vintas coming, the big church bell would ring the alarm and people rushed inside the church, fighting back with bows and arrows and spears.

The place assumed the role of cabeceria of all the municipalities in the north-western side of Leyte during the Spanish regime. At that time Palompon was under the parish of Hilongos. The parish priest visited the place occasionally for marriage, baptism and masses.

The Jesuits, later succeeded by the Augustinians, built the present church with 300 natives, who were forced labor without pay. If one or some of the laborers were unable to work, they were substituted by others just to maintain the quota every day for the next thirty years. The structure soon became a landmark of Palompon, reputed to be the oldest church in Leyte. On November 12, 1784, Palompon obtained its parochial independence from Hilongos.

Sometime in late 17th century, there was a nine-day battle between the Palomponganons and Moro raiders during which the residents rushed to the stone church (newly completed at that time) and took refuge for more than a week. The Moros suffered losses in that encounter and were defeated. A cannon in the town's plaza is a relic of that battle.

Ormoc remained part of Palompon parish from 1784 until 1851, when finally it was declared as an independent parish. Villaba and Matag-ob were both part of the territorial jurisdiction of this town as well before they obtained their municipio (pueblo) status.

In 1957 the barrios of Santo Rosario, Santa Rosa, Balagtas, San Vicente and Mabini were separated from the municipality of Palompon and constituted into Matag-ob.

== Geography ==
=== Climate ===
Climate data for Palompon, Leyte
Month	Jan	Feb	Mar	Apr	May	Jun	Jul	Aug	Sep	Oct	Nov	Dec	Year
Mean daily maximum °C (°F)	28 (82)	29 (84)	29 (84)	30 (86)	30 (86)	30 (86)	29 (84)	29 (84)	29 (84)	29 (84)	29 (84)	29 (84)	29 (84)
Mean daily minimum °C (°F)	22 (72)	22 (72)	22 (72)	23 (73)	25 (77)	25 (77)	25 (77)	25 (77)	25 (77)	24 (75)	24 (75)	23 (73)	24 (75)
Average precipitation mm (inches)	78 (3.1)	57 (2.2)	84 (3.3)	79 (3.1)	118 (4.6)	181 (7.1)	178 (7.0)	169 (6.7)	172 (6.8)	180 (7.1)	174 (6.9)	128 (5.0)	1,598 (62.9)
Average rainy days	16.7	13.8	17.3	18.5	23.2	26.5	27.1	26.0	26.4	27.5	24.6	21.0	268.6
Source: Meteoblue

=== Barangays ===
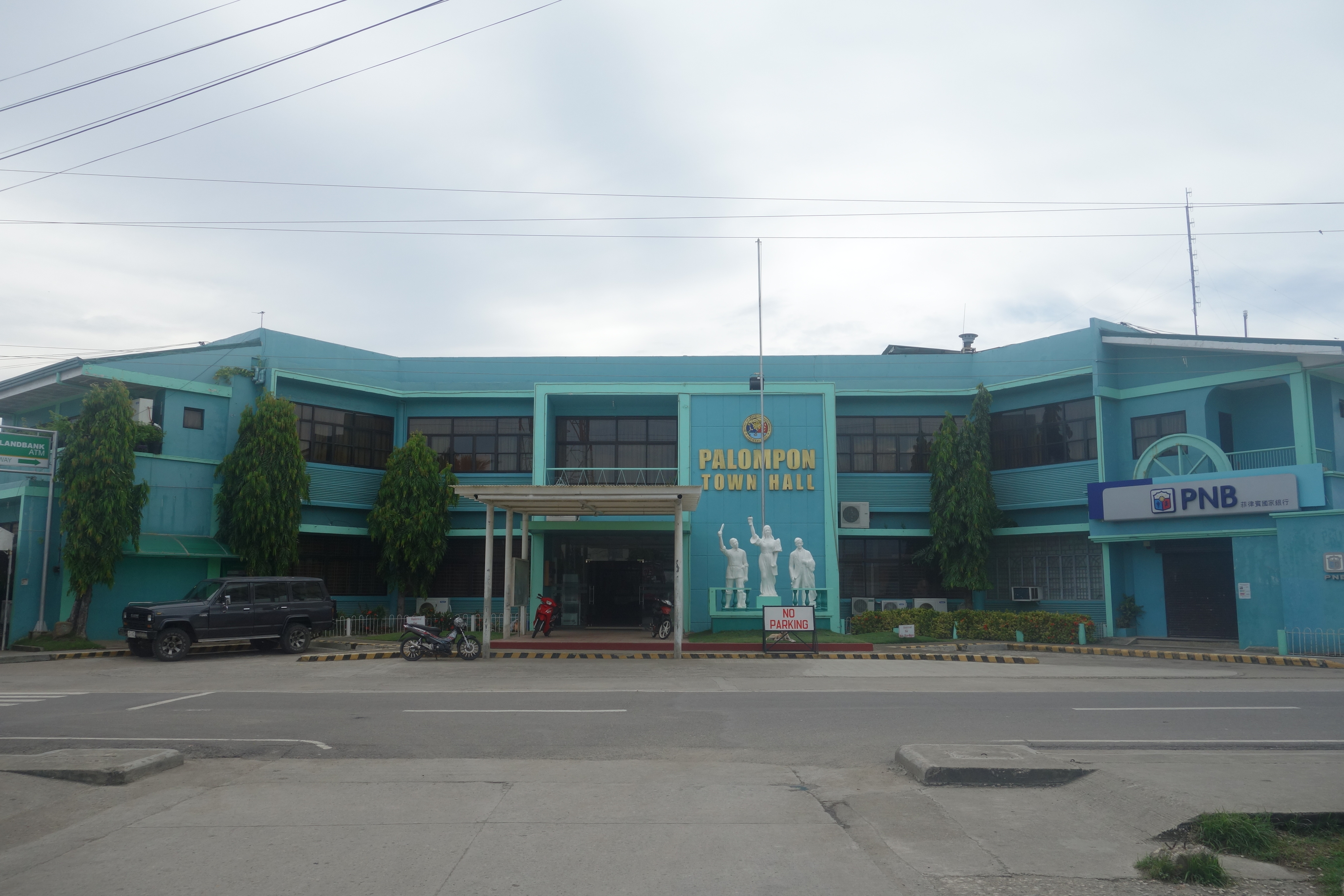
Municipal Hall

Palompon is politically subdivided into 50 barangays, Each barangay consists of puroks and some have sitios.

- Baguinbin
- Belen
- Bitaog Poblacion (Ypil III)
- Buenavista
- Caduhaan
- Cambakbak
- Cambinoy
- Cangcosme
- Cangmuya
- Canipaan
- Cantandoy
- Cantuhaon
- Catigahan
- Central 1 (Poblacion)
- Central 2 (Poblacion)
- Cruz
- Duljugan
- Guiwan 1 (Poblacion)
- Guiwan 2 (Poblacion)
- Himarco
- Hinablayan Poblacion (Central 3)
- Hinagbuan
- Lat-osan
- Liberty
- Lomonon
- Mabini
- Magsaysay
- Masaba
- Mazawalo Poblacion (Lili-on)
- Parilla
- Pinagdait Poblacion (Ypil I)
- Pinaghi-usa Poblacion (Ypil II)
- Plaridel
- Rizal
- Sabang
- San Guillermo
- San Isidro
- San Joaquin
- San Juan
- San Miguel
- San Pablo
- San Pedro
- San Roque
- Santiago
- Taberna
- Tabunok
- Tambis
- Tinabilan
- Tinago
- Tinubdan

10 of which are poblacion barangays with an area of approximately 1 square kilometer; the other forty 40 barangays are distributed along the coastline and in the interior rural and mountainous areas.

== Demographics ==
Population census of Palompon

Year	Pop.	±% p.a.
1903	10,199	—
1918	16,208	+3.14%
1939	29,120	+2.83%
1948	30,858	+0.65%
1960	31,291	+0.12%
1970	34,513	+0.98%
1975	36,540	+1.15%
1980	40,242	+1.95%

Year	Pop.	±% p.a.
1990	45,745	+1.29%
1995	50,319	+1.80%
2000	50,754	+0.18%
2007	52,530	+0.48%
2010	54,163	+1.12%
2015	58,108	+1.35%
2020	58,313	+0.07%
2024	59,486	+0.48%

Source: Philippine Statistics Authority

In the 2024 census, the population of Palompon was 59,486 people, with a density of 470 inhabitants per square kilometre or 1,200 inhabitants per square mile.

=== Language ===
Cebuano (Kana dialect) is widely spoken in Palompon. Waray-Waray may also be spoken by students from neighboring areas with native Waray-Waray speakers.

== Economy ==
Poverty incidence of Palompon (%)

Source: Philippine Statistics Authority

== Elected Officials ==
2025-2028 Palompon, Leyte Officials
Position	Name	Party
Mayor	Mary Dominique A. Oñate	PRP
Vice Mayor	Javes Keith R. Dela Calzada	PRP
Councilors	Burt Mari M. Bregaudit	NUP
Councilors	Edgar P. Pacaldo	NUP
Councilors	William O. Balasabas	NUP
Councilors	Vanessa N. Avenido	PRP
Councilors	Marivic E. Patalinghug	PRP
Councilors	Antonio R. Salazar	PRP
Councilors	Leonardo C. Quiamco Jr.	PRP
Councilors	Edilberto R. Longcanaya	NUP
Ex Officio Municipal Council Members
ABC President	Pablo B. Tan	Nonpartisan
SK Federation President	Manuelene Laurette M. Tee	Nonpartisan

== Education ==
Palompon has 2 tertiary institutions:

- Palompon Institute of Technology
- Northern Leyte College

It also has 12 secondary institutions:

=== Public ===
- Palompon National Highschool
- Lomonon National Highschool
- Tinabilan National Highschool
- Alfredo Parilla National Highschool (San Miguel)
- Taberna National Highschool
- Cantuhaon National Highschool
- San Guillermo National Highschool

=== Private ===
- PIT Laboratory Highschool (Semi-Public)
- Colegio de San Francisco Javier
- NLC Laboratory Highschool
- Ace Learning Center Inc.
- PromisedLand Educational Academy Inc.
