= Romualdez family =

Filipino political family

- Political family
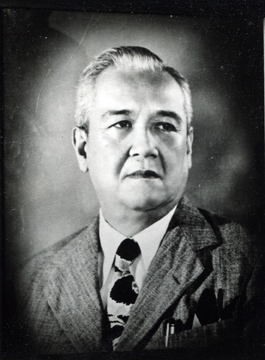
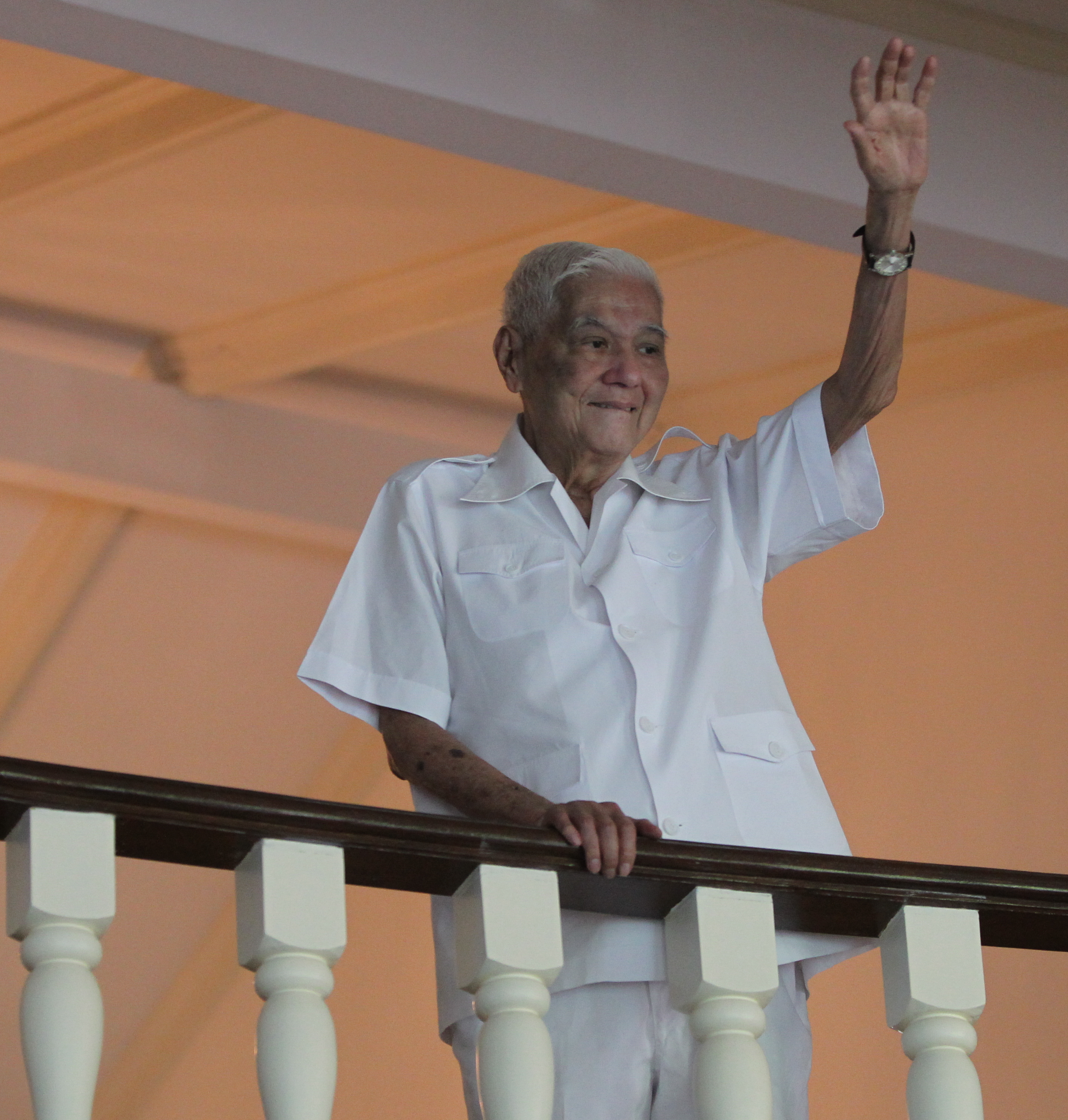
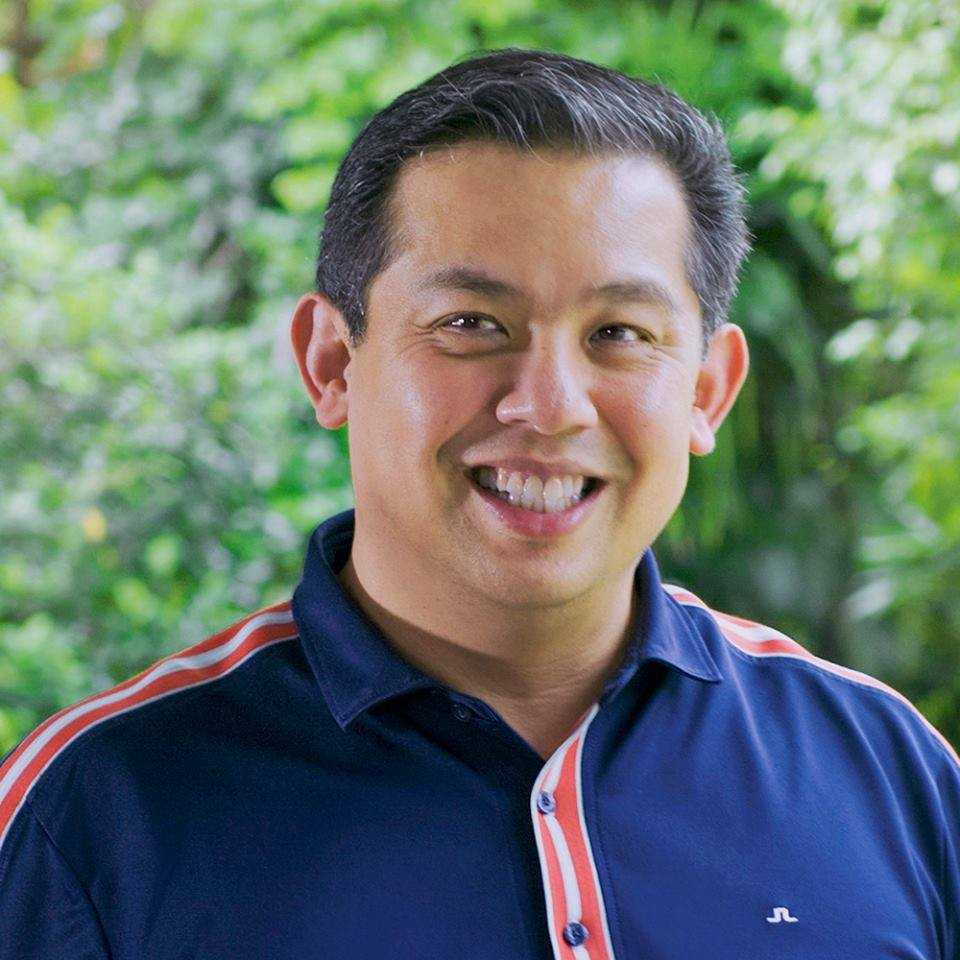
- Vicente Romuáldez Benjamin Romualdez Martin Romualdez
- Parent family: López family of Leyte
- Country: Philippines
- Current region: Leyte; Metro Manila
- Origin: Pandacan, Manila, Captaincy General of the Philippines
- Founder: Daniel Arcilla Romuáldez
- Members: Norberto Romualdez; Daniel Romualdez; Eduardo Romualdez; Alberto Romualdez; Johnny Romualdez; Jose Manuel Romualdez; Alfred Romualdez; Benjamin Romualdez; Martin Romualdez; Andrew Julian Romualdez
- Connected members: Yedda Romualdez; Cristina Gonzales
- Connected families: Marcos family
- Traditions: Roman Catholicism

The Romualdez family is a political family in the Philippines. Starting from Trinidad Lopez-Romualdez and Daniel Arcilla Romuáldez. The family reached its peak when Imelda Marcos, a Romualdez through her father, was the First Lady of the Philippines. It also reached its peak during the presidency of Bongbong Marcos. The family contains the careers of Daniel Romualdez, Imee Marcos, Norberto Romualdez, and Martin Romualdez.

== Family ==
=== First generation (1875–1920) ===
The family started with Trinidad Lopez-Romualdez as the matriarch and Daniel Arcilla Romuáldez as the Patriarch. Together, they had three children, including Norberto Romualdez, the Chief Justice of the Supreme Court of the Philippines, Miguel Romualdez, the former Mayor of Manila, and Vicente Romualdez, the former Sheriff of Leyte. The family started a coconut business, containing coconuts and abaca.

Norberto Romualdez became a writer, he also became known as the "favorite son of Leyte." He was appointed the assistant attorney of Manila. He was one of the "Seven Wise Men" which created the 1935 Philippine Constitution. In 1920, Miguel Romualdez was elected as the 6th Mayor of Manila. In 1938, Norberto Romualdez was also elected as a representative for Leyte's 4th congressional district.

=== Second generation (1920–1935) ===
The son of Miguel Romualdez, Daniel, became the Speaker of the House of Representatives of the Philippines. He married Paz Gueco, the aunt of Ninoy Aquino. Another one of Miguel's sons, Eduardo Romualdez, became the secretary of Finance from 1966 to 1970. After, he was appointed Ambassador of the Philippines to the United States from 1971 to 1982. Another son, Alberto Romualdez Sr., was elected the Secretary General of the World Medical Association from 1965 to 1973. He died in November 1986.

Vicente Romualdez and his wife Remedios Romualdez had six children, one of them Imelda Marcos, born on July 2, 1929. Vicente Romualdez had several children from another marriage. Remedios died eight years later. The family of Vicente was excluded from the inner circle of the family, causing the leg to be poor. Vicente had another son, Benjamin Romualdez, a former Governor of Leyte. Another child was Alita Romualdez Martel, who married an owner of the construction company Martel Brothers. Armando Romualdez, another child, gained controversy by the Sandiganbayan for gaining ill-gotten land. On November 4, 1941, Norberto Romualdez died.

=== Third generation (1935–1970) ===
Alberto Romualdez and his children moved to the United States for his work. According to his son, Jose Manuel Romualdez, he pushed the family to work at a young age. Alberto Romualdez's son, Alberto Romualdez Jr., was the Secretary of Health under the Cabinet of Joseph Estrada. Another one of Alberto's sons, Johnny Romualdez, was a Filipino footballer and the captain of the national Philippine football team during the 1968 Summer Olympics. The last son of Alberto, Jose Manuel Romualdez, is currently the Ambassador of the Philippines to the United States.

Imelda Marcos married to Future President Ferdinand Marcos in 1954. Their first child, Imee Marcos, was born on November 12, 1955. Their second child, Future President Bongbong Marcos, was born on September 13, 1957.Ferdinand Marcos joined the Senate of the Philippines from 1959 to 1965. Their third child, Irene Marcos was born on September 15, 1960. In the 1965 Philippine presidential election, Ferdinand Marcos was elected president. On September 21, 1972, Pres. Marcos declared martial law. He fled the country on February 25, 1986, due to the People Power Revolution, and died three years later in Hawaii.

Benjamin Romualdez's first child was Martin Romualdez. Benjamin's second child, Daniel Romualdez, is an architect, which gained the "World's Best Contemporary Interior Designers" award in 2021. The third child, Philipp Romualdez, is the chairman in Manila Standard. The last child of Benjamin is Marian Romualdez.

=== Fourth generation (1970–present) ===
Imee Marcos married Tommy Manotoc, a Filipino basketball coach. From 1998 to 2004, Marcos served as a two-term representative for Ilocos Norte's 2nd congressional district. In the 2019 Philippine Senate election, Marcos ran under the Nacionalista Party, gaining 8th with 15,740,650 votes. Their first child is Fernando "Borgy" Manotoc, a Filipino model. Their second child is Michael Manotoc, an attorney. Their third child is Matthew Manotoc, a two-term Governor of Ilocos Norte. Irene Marcos is married to Gregorio Araneta III. They have two children. Luis Araneta, president of Araneta Properties, and Alfonso Araneta.

Bongbong Marcos married Liza Araneta Marcos on April 22, 1993. In 1994, Sandro Marcos was born. On November 25, 1995, Joseph Simon Marcos was born. In 1998, Vinny Marcos was born. During their childhood, they grew up by the beach. In the 2016 Philippine presidential election, Bongbong Marcos ran for vice president independently. He gained 2nd place, with 13,803,966 votes. On December 12, 2017, Sandro Marcos graduated. In the 2022 Philippine presidential election, Bongbong Marcos ran for president, winning with 31,104,175 votes or 58.74 percent of the votes. On the other hand, Sandro ran for congressman of Ilocos Norte's 1st congressional district, winning with 108,423 votes or 56.63 percent of the votes.

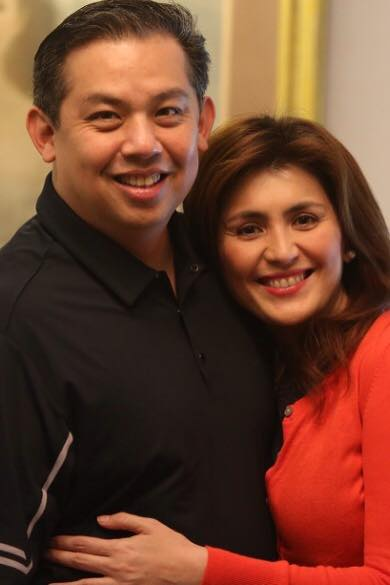
Martin and Yedda Romualdez.

Martin Romualdez's wife is Yedda Romualdez, a politician and beauty pageant titleholder. They have four children together. Their first child, Andrew, was born in 2000. Their second child, Ferdinand Martin Jr., was born in 2001. Their third child, Mariabella, was born in 2007. Their fourth and last child, Maddey, was born in 2015. Rep. Martin served as the congressman for Leyte's 1st congressional district from 2007 to 2016. He ran for senator in the 2016 Philippine Senate election under Lakas–CMD, gaining 15th place with 12,066,998 votes. He, again, became the congressman for Leyte's 1st district from 2019, and served a second term in 2022, becoming the Speaker of the House of Representatives of the Philippines. In 2022, Andrew received his diploma in International Agriculture and Rural Development at Cornell University. Just after, he was nominated as the director of Marcventures Holdings. On October 2, 2024, Martin Jr. ran for councilor in the 2025 Tacloban local elections.

== Notable family members ==
Image	Name	Description
	Miguel Romuáldez	A member of the Philippine Assembly from Leyte and 6th Mayor of Manila
	Norberto Romualdez	24th Associate Justice of the Supreme Court of the Philippines and representative from Leyte's 4th district from 1936 to 1941
	Vicente Romuáldez	Lawyer and the father of Imelda Marcos and Benjamin Romualdez
	Benjamin Romualdez	Governor of Leyte from 1967 to 1986 and Ambassador of the Philippines to the United States from 1982 to 1986
	Martin Romualdez	Representative from Leyte's 1st district and 28th Speaker of the House of Representatives of the Philippines from 2022 to 2025
	Andrew Julian Romualdez	Representative for the Tingog Partylist since 2025
	Marty Romualdez	Member of the Tacloban City Council since 2025
	Alfred Romualdez	Mayor of Tacloban and former representative from Leyte's 1st district
	Raymund Romualdez	Vice Mayor of Tacloban since 2025
	Daniel Romualdez	Representative from 1st and 4th district of Leyte and 10th Speaker of the House of Representatives of the Philippines
	Eduardo Romualdez	Secretary of Finance from 1966 to 1970 and Ambassador of the Philippines to the United States from 1971 to 1982
	Alberto Romualdez	25th Secretary of Health from 1998 to 2001
	Johnny Romualdez	Footballer and President of the Philippine Football Federation from 2004 to 2008
	Jose Manuel Romualdez	Ambassador of the Philippines to the United States since 2017

== Other prominent members ==
Image	Name	Description
	Imelda Marcos	First Lady of the Philippines from 1965 to 1986
	Imee Marcos	Senator of the Philippines since 2019
	Bongbong Marcos	President of the Philippines since 2022
	Irene Marcos	Third child of Imelda Marcos
	Aimee Marcos	Adopted child of Imelda Marcos
	Sandro Marcos	First child of Bongbong Marcos
	William Vincent Marcos	Third and youngest child of Bongbong Marcos
	Matthew Manotoc	Third child of Imee Marcos
	Luigi Quisumbing	Mayor of Mandaue from 2016 to 2019
