= Romualdez =

Surname

Romualdez (Spanish: Romuáldez) is a Filipino surname. Notable people with the surname include:

- Alberto Romualdez (1940–2013), Filipino politician and doctor
- Alfred Romualdez (born 1962), Filipino politician
- Martin Romualdez (born 1963), Filipino politician, Media businessman person
- Benjamin Romualdez (1930–2012), Filipino politician, former Governor of Leyte, ambassador to the United States, China and Saudi Arabia
- Jose Manuel Romualdez (born 1947), Filipino Diplomat
- Daisy Romualdez, Filipino actress, married to well known former basketball player Manny Paner
- Daniel Romualdez (1907–1965), Filipino politician, Speaker of the House of Representatives of the Philippines (1957–1962)
- Ferdinand Romualdez Marcos Jr. (born 1957), 17th President of the Philippines and former senator, only son of former Philippine President Ferdinand E. Marcos
- Imee Romualdez Marcos (born 1955), Filipino politician, Governor of Ilocos Norte and senator, daughter of Ferdinand E. Marcos
- Imelda Romualdez Marcos (born 1929), Filipino politician, widow of former Philippine President Ferdinand Marcos
- Norberto Romuáldez (1875–1941), Philippine writer, politician, jurist and statesman
- Johnny Romualdez (born 1941), former Philippine international footballer and former President of the Philippine Football Federation (PFF)
- Jose Manuel Romualdez (born 1947), Filipino journalist, Ambassador to the United States
- Remedios T. Romualdez (1902–1938), the mother of Imelda Marcos, widow of former Philippine President Ferdinand Marcos

== See also ==
- Romualdez family
- Daniel Z. Romualdez Airport (IATA: TAC, ICAO: RPVA), an airport serving the general area of Tacloban City in the province of Leyte in the Philippines
- Remedios T. Romualdez, Agusan del Norte, 5th class municipality in the province of Agusan del Norte, Philippines
