= Mayor of Tacloban =

Local chief executive of Tacloban City, Philippines

Mayor of Tacloban City
- Tagalog: Punong Lungsod ng Tacloban; Waray: Alkalde han Tacloban
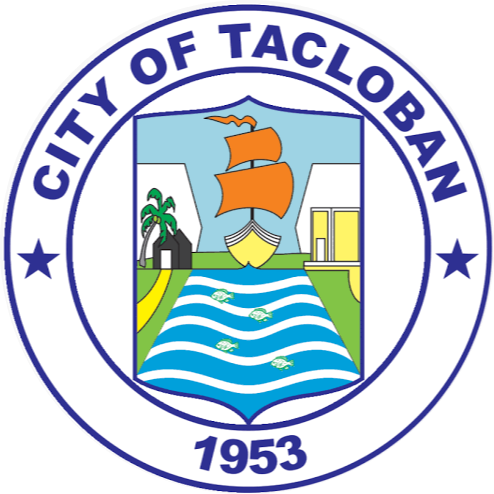
- Seal of Tacloban City

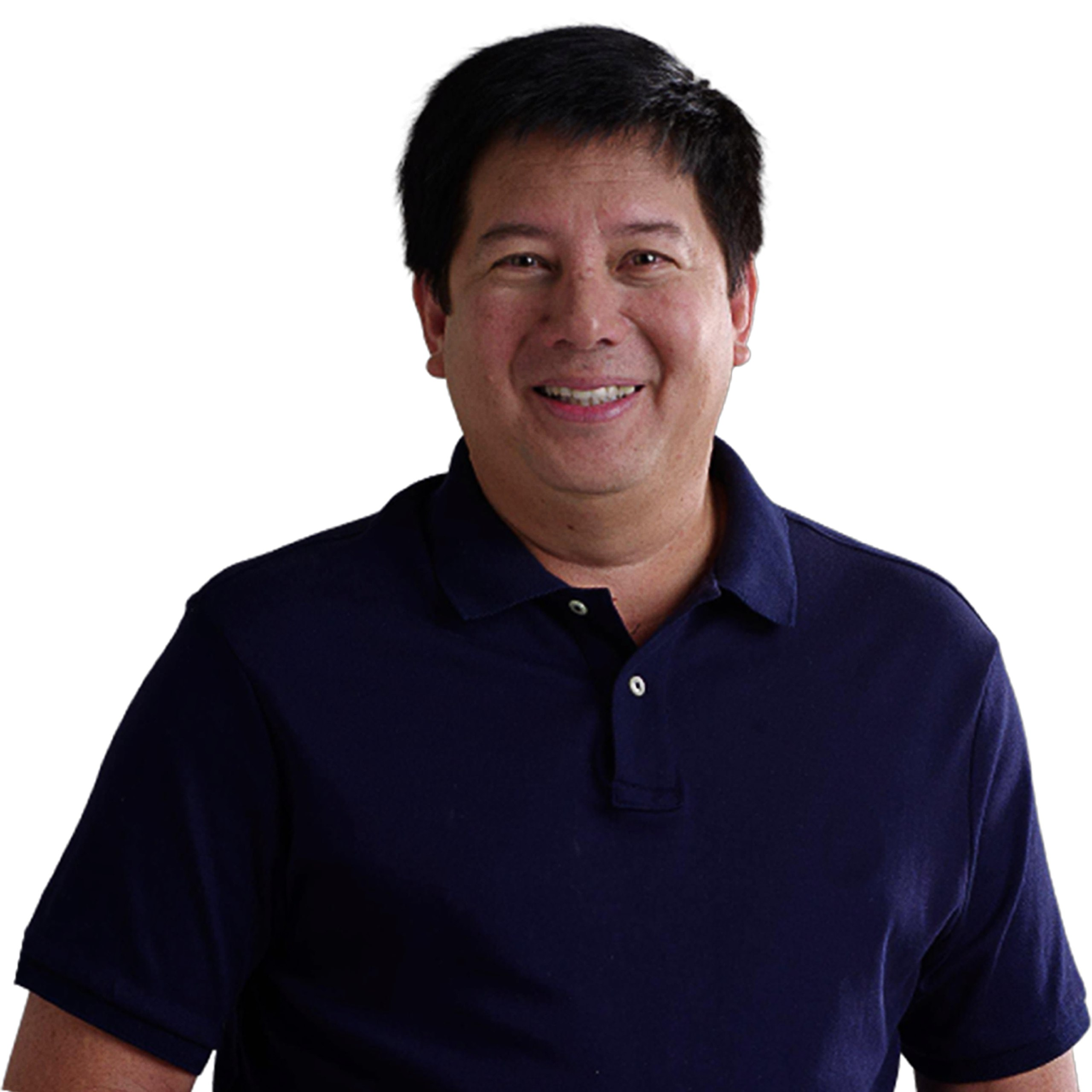
- Incumbent; Alfred Romualdez since June 30, 2019
- Style: The Honorable
- Seat: Tacloban City Hall
- Appointer: Elected via popular vote
- Term length: 3 years
- Deputy: Vice Mayor

The Mayor of Tacloban (Waray: Alkalde han Tacloban) is the local chief executive and head of the Local Government of Tacloban City, Leyte.

== List of mayors of Tacloban ==
| No. | Image | Name | Term | Notes and References |
|---|---|---|---|---|
| 1 | | Ildefonso Cinco | 1953–1957 | |
| 2 | | Artemio Mate | 1958–1965 | Elected twice. |
| 3 | | Antonio Jaro | 1965–1971 | |
| 4 | | Filomeno Arteche | 1971–1976 | |
| 5 | | Obdulia Cinco | 1976–1986 | |
| 6 | | Emmanuel Veloso | 1986–1988 | |
| 7 | | Uldarico Mate | February 2, 1988–June 30, 1998 | |
| 8 | | Alfredo Romualdez | June 30, 1998–June 30, 2007 | |
| 9 | | Alfred Romualdez | June 30, 2007–June 30, 2016 | Elected thrice. |
| 10 | | Cristina Gonzales | June 30, 2016–June 30, 2019 | Wife of Alfred Romualdez. Elected once. |
| 11 | | Alfred Romualdez | June 30, 2019–present | Re-elected thrice. |

== Elections ==
- 2007 Tacloban local elections
- 2010 Tacloban local elections
- 2013 Tacloban local elections
- 2016 Tacloban local elections
- 2019 Tacloban local elections
- 2022 Tacloban local elections
- 2025 Tacloban local elections
