= Eduardo Romualdez =

Filipino diplomat

The Honorable Eduardo Z. Romualdez
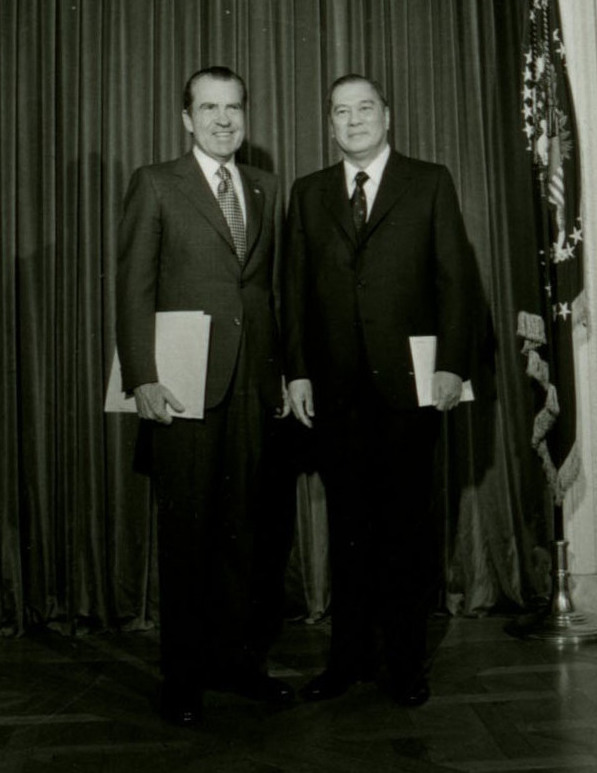
- Romualdez presenting his credentials as ambassador to United States President Richard Nixon in 1971.

Ambassador of the Philippines to the United States
- In office 1971–1982
- Appointed by: Ferdinand Marcos
- Preceded by: Ernesto Lagdameo
- Succeeded by: Benjamin Romualdez

Secretary of Finance
- In office January 1, 1966 – February 4, 1970
- Appointed by: Ferdinand Marcos
- Preceded by: Rufino Hechanova
- Succeeded by: Cesar Virata

Personal details
- Born: Eduardo Zialcita Romualdez; November 22, 1909 Tolosa, Leyte, Philippine Islands
- Died: July 19, 2001 (aged 91)
- Resting place: La Loma Cemetery
- Spouse: Concepcion Veloso
- Relations: Daniel Z. Romualdez (brother)
- Children: 4
- Education: University of the Philippines; University of Santo Tomas; Georgetown University

Eduardo Zialcita Romualdez (November 22, 1909 – July 19, 2001) was a Filipino banker, financial administrator and diplomat who served as the Ambassador of the Philippines to the United States from 1971 to 1982. He also was Secretary of Finance, serving from 1966 to 1970 under the Marcos administration.

== Early life and education ==
Romualdez was born on November 22, 1909, in Tolosa, Leyte to Miguel Lopez Romualdez, assemblyman for Leyte and Mayor of Manila during World War II, and Brigida Zialcita. His siblings includes former House Speaker Daniel Romualdez. He is the nephew of Supreme Court Associate Justice Norberto Romualdez and is the uncle of former Health Secretary Alberto Romualdez, footballer Johnny Romualdez and current Ambassador to the United States Babe Romualdez. He is also the first cousin of former First Lady Imelda Marcos and Ambassador Benjamin Romualdez.

Romualdez went to Ateneo de Manila University for highschool, graduating in 1925. He studied at the University of the Philippines where he earned his degree in philosophy. He held a master's degree from the University of Santo Tomas and a doctorate from Georgetown University.

== Career ==
Romualdez's career in government began in 1934 when he was a bank manager at the Bureau of Banking (predecessor of the current Bangko Sentral ng Pilipinas) under the Department of Finance, serving until 1947.

He was president of the Philippine Trust Company and the Fidelity and Surety Company from 1947 to 1954. From 1951 to 1956, he was the regional vice-president of the American Bankers Association. Also in 1951, Romualdez was appointed by President Elpidio Quirino as member of the National Power Corporation Board of Directors. In 1954, he was appointed by President Ramon Magsaysay as chairman and CEO of the Rehabilitation Finance Corporation (now reorganized as the Development Bank of the Philippines). Due to his position as RFC chairman, he was an ex officio member of the Monetary Board of the Central Bank of the Philippines. He also was the government representative and chairman of the board of Philippine Airlines beginning in January 1954 until 1962. In 1956, Magsaysay nominated Romualdez to be the Philippine alternate governor to the International Monetary Fund and the International Bank for Reconstruction and Development. His nomination was approved by the Commission on Appointments in July 1956 and he served until 1961. He also briefly served as an ex officio member of the Cabinet of the Philippines owing to him becoming the presiding officer of the National Economic Council in 1956.

In 1958, President Carlos P. Garcia nominated Romualdez to be president of the Philippine National Bank, cutting short his term as RFC chairman. He served with the bank until 1961. Throughout the 1950s, Romualdez was either a member or the chairman of the board of directors of various companies including Insular Life and Baguio Gold Mining Co. (now PAL Holdings, Inc.). He was director of the Chamber of Commerce of the Philippines from 1950 to 1952. He became president of Philippine Airlines from 1961 to 1962 and again from 1966 to 1970.

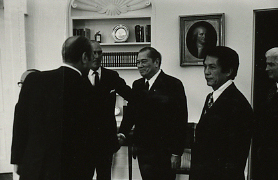
Ambassador Romualdez (center) shaking hands with President Gerald Ford in 1976. Defense Minister Juan Ponce Enrile can be seen at the right.

In 1966, Romualdez was appointed by President Ferdinand Marcos to be his Secretary of Finance. In 1970, due to student protests now known as the First Quarter Storm, several cabinet members were replaced by Marcos including Romualdez, who was replaced by Cesar Virata. In 1971, he was appointed Ambassador of the Philippines to the United States. He presented his credentials to United States President Richard Nixon on October 13, 1971.

In November 1974, Romualdez was held hostage for over 10 hours at the Philippine Embassy in Washington, D.C. According to The New York Times, it was believed to be the first time a foreign ambassador was held hostage in the United States. Romualdez was eventually released after assurances were made by President Marcos that the perpetrator's son in the Philippines would be given an exit visa and be allowed to leave the country.

== Personal life ==
Romualdez was married to Concepcion Veloso, the daughter of Jose Maria Veloso. They had 4 children. He was a member of the Rotary Club becoming president in 1953 and later, as a district governor of Rotary International. He also supported the Philippine Tuberculosis Society and the Philippine Cancer Society.

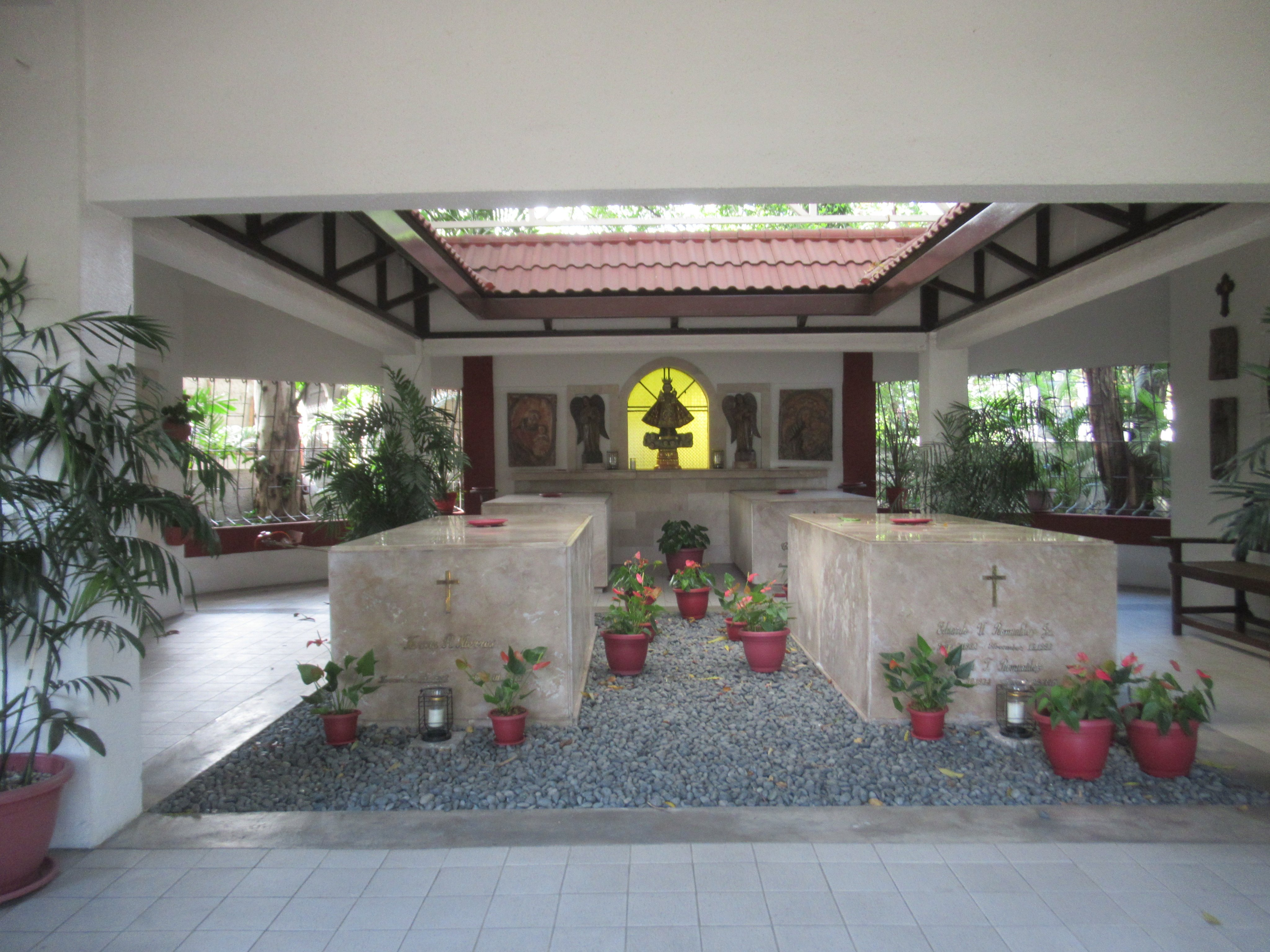
Eduardo Romualdez's family mausoleum at La Loma Cemetery.

== Death ==
Romualdez died in his sleep on July 19, 2001, at age 91. He was buried on July 24 at La Loma Cemetery.
