= Norberto Romualdez =

Filipino writer, lawyer and politician

The Honorable Norberto Romuáldez
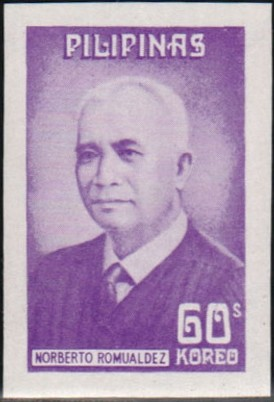
- Norberto Romualdez on a Philippine postage stamp (c. 1975)

24th Associate Justice of the Supreme Court of the Philippines
- In office November 1, 1921 – April 1, 1932
- Appointed by: Warren Harding
- Preceded by: Manuel Araullo
- Succeeded by: José Abad Santos

Member of the Philippine National Assembly from Leyte's 4th district
- In office September 1, 1936 – November 4, 1941
- Preceded by: Francisco Enage
- Succeeded by: Filomeno Montejo (as Representative)

Personal details
- Born: Norberto Romuáldez y López; June 6, 1875 Burauen, Leyte, Captaincy General of the Philippines
- Died: November 4, 1941 (aged 66) Palapag, Samar, Commonwealth of the Philippines
- Party: Nacionalista
- Spouses: Mariquita Marquez (m. 1899; died 1903) Beatriz Duarte Romualdez (m. 1907)
- Relatives: Imelda Marcos (niece); Benjamin Romualdez (nephew); Daniel Z. Romualdez (nephew); Eduardo Romualdez (nephew); Alberto Romualdez (grandnephew); Johnny Romualdez (grandnephew); Jose Manuel Romualdez (grandnephew); Irene Araneta (grandniece); Imee Marcos (grandniece); Bongbong Marcos (grandnephew); Sandro Marcos (great-grandnephew); Robert RDC Hofmann (great-grandson)

Norberto Romuáldez y López (June 6, 1875 – November 4, 1941), often referred to as Norberto Romuáldez Sr. to distinguish him from his son with the same name, was a Philippine writer, politician, jurist, and statesman. He was the first Lopez-Romuáldez to attain national prominence, and is deemed the "Father of the Law on the National Language". He was the eldest son of Doña Trinidad López de Romuáldez, the Romuáldez grand matriarch, and uncle of First Lady of the Philippines Imelda Romualdez Marcos, the daughter of his youngest brother Vicente Orestes Lopez Romualdez.

== Biography ==
Born to the prominent López clan of Leyte (originally from Granada in the Andalusian region of Spain), he is the grandson of Spanish friar and silversmith Don Francisco López. Romuáldez grew up in Leyte, where the López family owned vast coconut and abacá plantations, and first achieved status as a writer in the Waray language. His first Waray zarzuela was An Pagtabang ni San Miguel (The Aid of Saint Michael).

In 1895, the “favorite son of Leyte,” earned his Bachelor of Arts with honors at the Ateneo Municipal de Manila. In 1895, he was a secondary school teacher at the University of Santo Tomas. He passed the Philippine Bar Examinations in 1903.

In 1908, Romuáldez wrote Bisayan Grammar and Notes on Bisayan Rhetoric and Poetic and Filipino Dialectology, a treatise on the grammar of the Waray language. The following year (1909) he founded the Sanghiran san Binisaya ha Samar ug Leyte (Academy of the Visayan Language of Samar and Leyte) for the purpose of promoting and intellectualizing Waray. Romuáldez was also fluent in other languages like Spanish, English, and Cebuano.

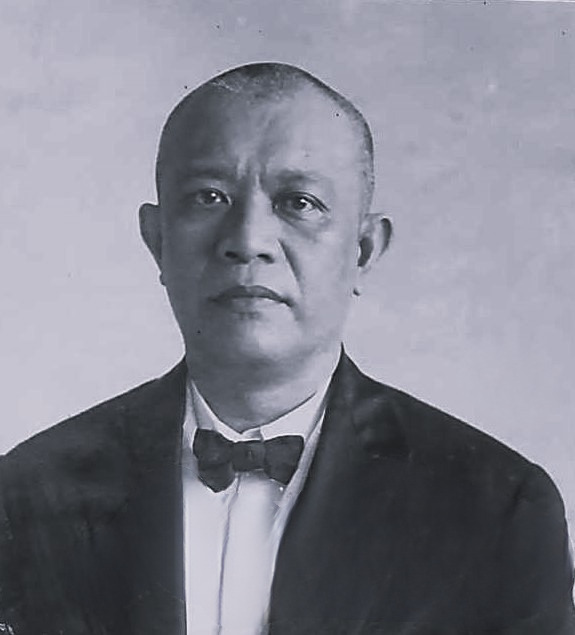
Romuáldez in 1920

Romuáldez served as an Associate Justice of the Philippine Supreme Court during the American Period. He was a delegate to 1934-1935 Constitutional convention, being one of the "Seven Wise Men" who drafted the 1935 Constitution of the Philippines for the Philippine Commonwealth.

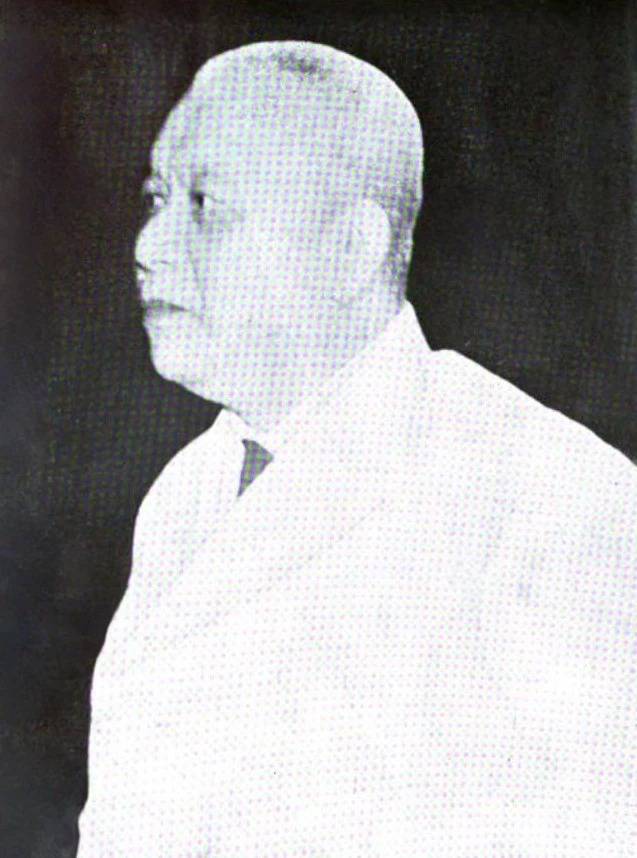
Photograph from The Commercial & Industrial Manual of the Philippines, 1941

He was later elected as assemblyman from the 4th district of Leyte through a special election in 1936. He was re-elected in 1938.

Romuáldez ran for senator in 1941. However, he died of pneumonia in Palapag, Samar (now part of Northern Samar) at the age of 66, a week before the election. A book written about his niece Imelda Marcos's life notes that he died of a heart attack.

== Commemoration and legacy ==
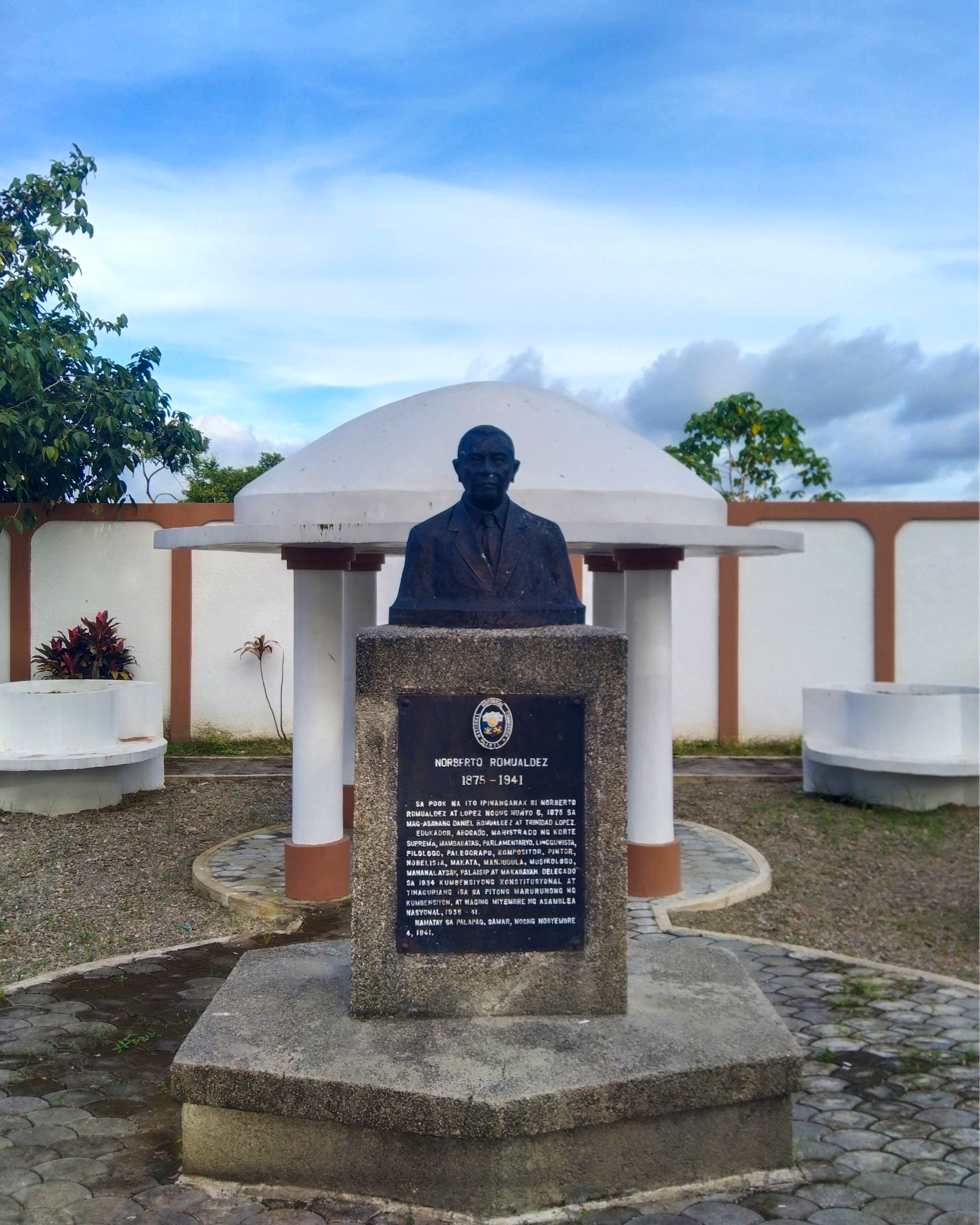
Burauen monument - historical marker

On the eve of his niece Imelda Romualdez Marcos and her husband Ferdinand Marcos's proclamation as President and First Lady of the Philippines, in 1965, his composition, a song, "Plegaria" (A Plea), was sung in the Marcos family home in San Juan, Rizal (now part of Metro Manila).

=== Norberto Romualdez Sr. park ===
On June 14, 2024, Burauen Mayor Juanito Renomeron inaugurated the restored 177-square-meter (1,910 sq ft) park built in 1975, beside the 1600 Our Lady of the Immaculate Conception Church along the corner of Santa Ana and Ave Maria Streets, the exact site of his 1800s ancestral house. It is named after Romualdez. It was first improved in 2022 with the assistance of the National Historical Commission of the Philippines assistance. Romualdez' monument with a 1975 NHCP installed marker stands as the centerpiece with pavilion, concrete benches and a path walk.

== Writings ==
=== Published works ===
- 1899: An Pagtabang ni San Miguel ("The Aid of Saint Michael"; drama)
- 1908: Bisayan Grammar and Notes on Bisayan Rhetoric and Poetic and Filipino Dialectology (linguistics)
- 1914: Tagbanwa Alphabet with Some Reforms Proposed (essays)
- 1918: Philippine Orthography (essays)
- 1921: An Anak han Manaranggot ("The Tuba Gatherer's Child", drama)
- 1925: The Psychology of the Filipino (lectures)
- 1931: Filipino Musical Instruments and Airs of Long Ago (lectures)
- 1933: Philippine Legal and Business Forms Annotated; co-authored with Enrique P. Custodio

== See also ==
- Lope K. Santos

Legal offices
Preceded by Manuel Araullo	Associate Justice of the Supreme Court of the Philippines; 1921–1932	Succeeded by José Abad Santos
