= Jose Manuel Romualdez =

Filipino journalist, business executive and diplomat (born 1947)

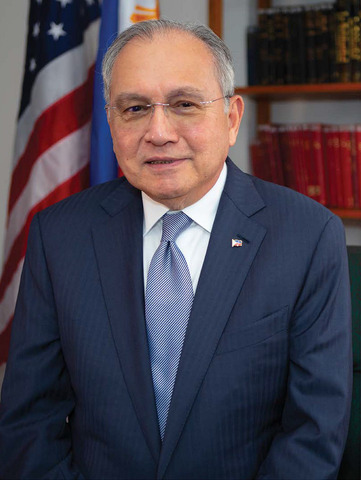
- Official portrait, 2017

Ambassador of the Philippines to the United States
- Incumbent
- Assumed office August 29, 2017
- President: Rodrigo Duterte; Bongbong Marcos
- Preceded by: Jose L. Cuisia Jr.

Personal details
- Born: Jose Manuel del Gallego Romualdez; November 8, 1947 (age 78) Manila, Philippines
- Spouse: Maria Lourdes Marquez
- Children: 4
- Education: De La Salle University (BS)
- Occupation: Journalist; columnist; publisher; businessman

Jose Manuel "Babe" del Gallego Romualdez (born November 8, 1947) is a Filipino journalist, publisher and business executive who has served as the ambassador of the Philippines to the United States since 2017. He previously served as special envoy of President Rodrigo Duterte to the United States.

== Early life and education ==
Romualdez was born on November 8, 1947, in Manila to Alberto Romualdez Sr., a former secretary general of the World Medical Association, and Covadonga del Gallego, a former chair of the Pathology Department of the University of Santo Tomas Hospital. His siblings include former Secretary of Health Alberto Romualdez Jr. and footballer Johnny Romualdez. He is also the nephew of former House Speaker Daniel Z. Romualdez and is related to former First Lady Imelda Marcos, with her children: Senator Imee Marcos, President Bongbong Marcos, Irene and Aimee being his second cousins. He is also a cousin of the recently resigned Speaker of the House Martin Romualdez.

On his mother's side, his maternal grandfather was a Spanish explorer named Don Juan del Gallego who founded the town of Del Gallego, Camarines Sur. His uncle Manuel del Gallego became governor of Camarines Sur in the 1940s. He is also related to actress Heart Evangelista through her mother, Maria Cecilia del Gallego-Payawal.

He went to Ateneo de Manila University Grade School from 1954 to 1962 and to Ateneo de Manila University High School from 1962 to 1965. In 1965, he and his family moved to New York City after his father's election to the World Medical Association. There, he studied at Forest Hills High School from 1965 to 1966. During this time, Romualdez worked as a part-time waiter in Manhattan and as a grocery-boy at an A&P supermarket in Queens.

Romualdez returned to the Philippines in 1966 where he went to De La Salle College. In 1970, he earned a Bachelor of Science degree in Business Administration from the university.

== Career ==
Right after graduating college, Romualdez started working as a TV newscaster and then anchor for NewsWatch, a newscast television program that aired on Kanlaon Broadcasting System (KBS). He rose to become executive assistant to the station's chairman of the board, and eventually was president and vice chairman of the board of the Television Corporation of the Philippines.

In 1989, he coordinated the media group for the official visit of then-Vice President Salvador Laurel to the United States. He also coordinated then-President Joseph Estrada's working visit to the U.S. in 1999. He was also a member of the business delegation of presidents Ramos during his visit to the U.S. and Mexico in May 1997 and to APEC Canada in November 1997; Aquino III during his visits to China, Japan and New Zealand; and Duterte during his official visit to Japan.

In 2007, he was elected president of the Manila Overseas Press Club (MOPC) and in 2010, he was elected board chairman. He is currently MOPC's vice chairman.

Romualdez also held various positions including being vice president of the Rotary Club of Manila, executive vice president of the Philippine Trade Foundation, and chairman of the Philippine offices of several US-based multinational firms, including FCB Manila and Weber Shandwick Philippines.

From January 2016 to September 2017, he was the honorary consul of Luxembourg to the Philippines.

He was the president and CEO of Stargate Media Corp., an affiliate of the Philippine Star and the publishing company of PEOPLE Asia magazine, where Romualdez was the publisher. He is also a columnist at the Philippine Star.

=== Ambassador to the United States ===
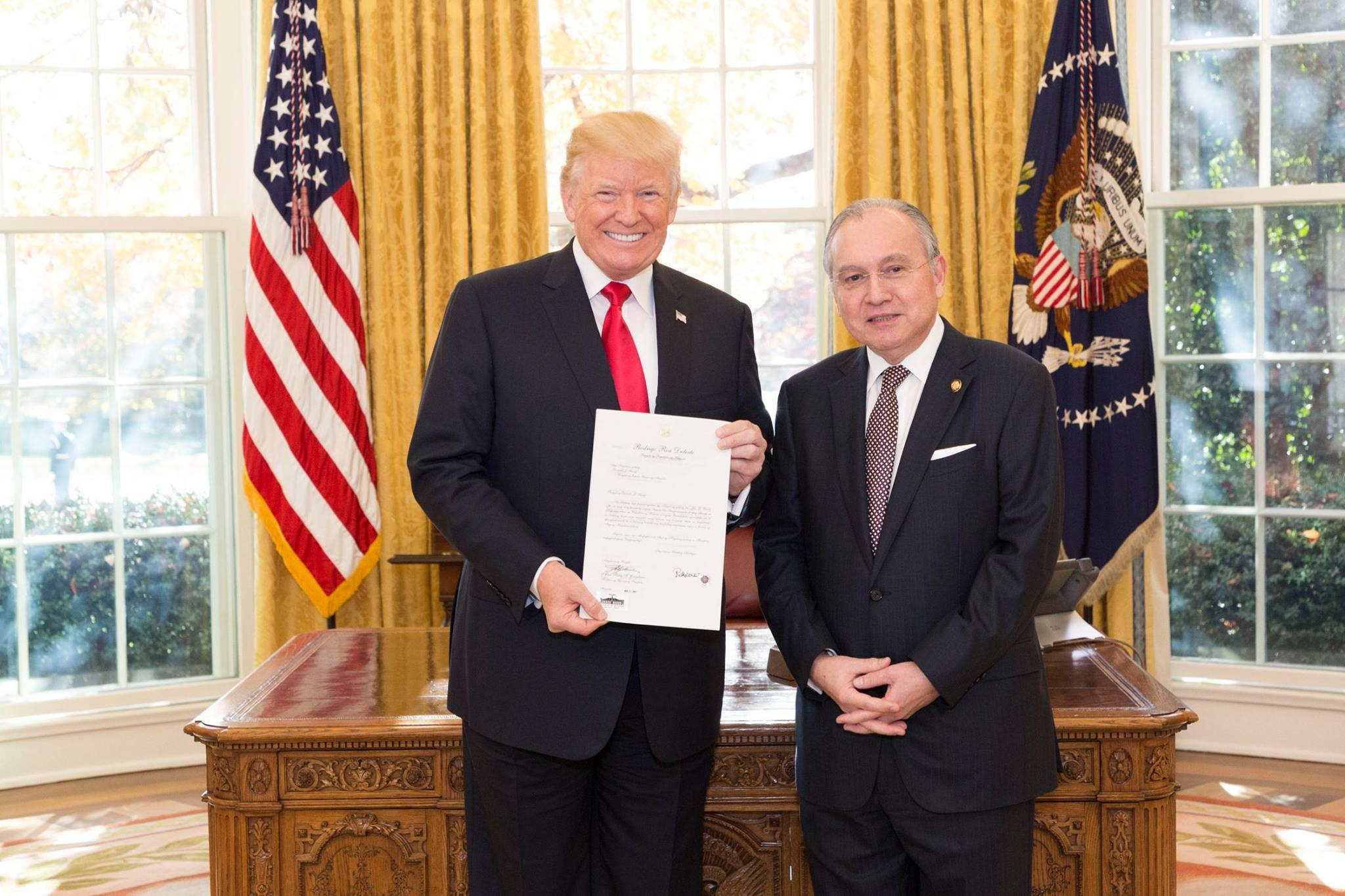
United States President Donald Trump accepting the credentials of Ambassador Romualdez in 2017

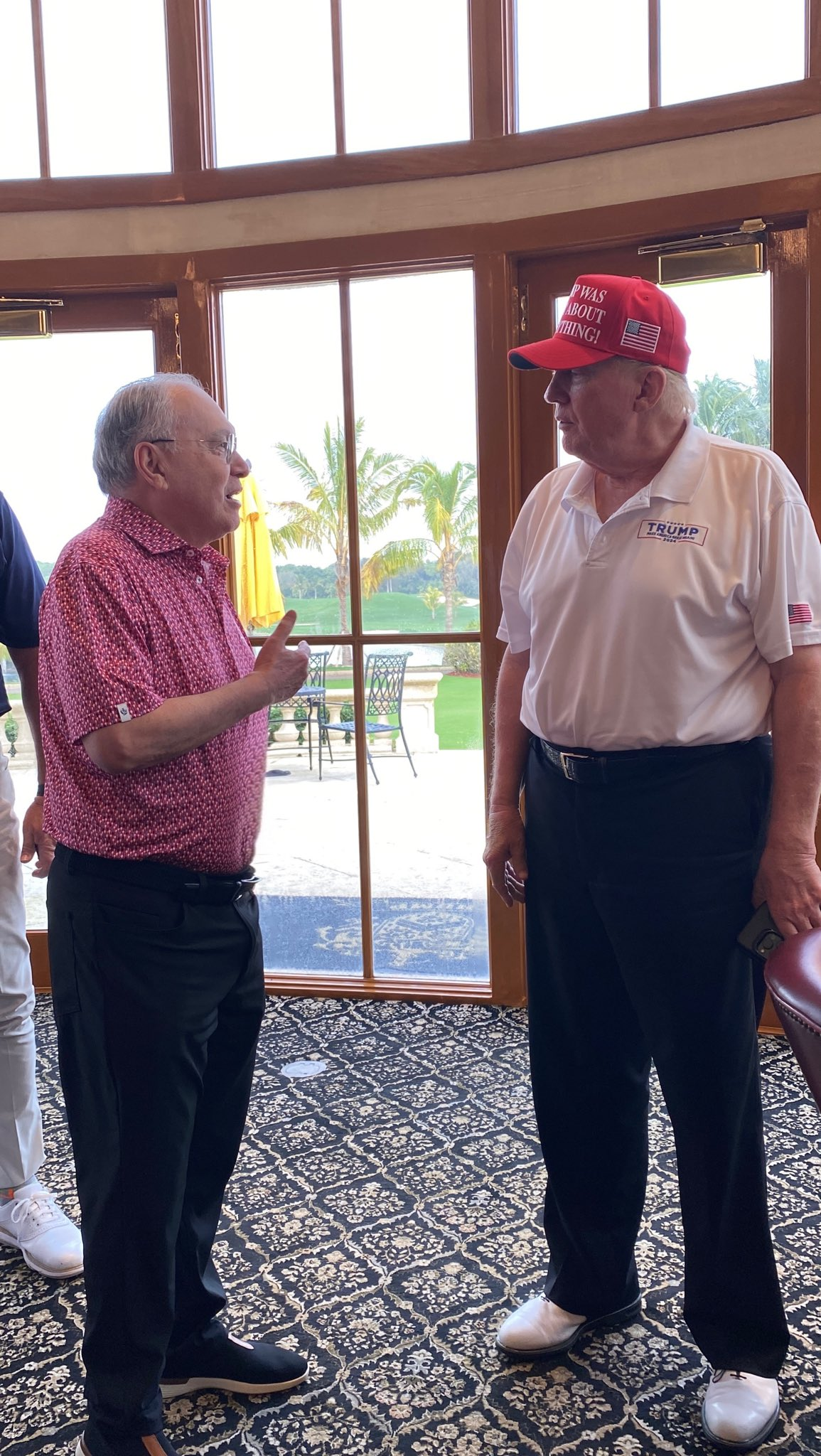
Ambassador Romualdez' impromptu meeting with U.S. President-elect Donald Trump at the latter's golf club in West Palm Beach, Florida, in 2024

From July to December 2016, Romualdez was appointed by President Rodrigo Duterte as his special envoy to the United States. In December 2016, he was asked by President Duterte to be the ambassador of the Philippines to the United States. However, he declined the offer, saying he could not assume the post for at least six months since he was to have an emergency operation for an eye ailment in January. His appointment as special envoy was later renewed on July 9, 2017.

On July 24, 2017, Romualdez was finally nominated by the president to be the Philippines' ambassador extraordinary and plenipotentiary to the United States of America. He was confirmed by the Commission on Appointments on August 23, 2017, and took his oath on August 29. He presented his credentials to United States President Donald Trump on November 29. He is the third member of the Romualdez family to occupy the post after his uncles Eduardo Romualdez and Benjamin Romualdez.

In May 2018, Ambassador Romualdez and the Philippine Embassy were criticized for choosing to celebrate their Independence Day celebrations at the Trump International Hotel in Washington, D.C. Despite the criticisms, however, the 120th Philippine Independence Day celebration still went through with the embassy defending their choice of venue by calling it "elegant and historic" for the occasion.

He represented the Philippine government during the official turnover ceremony of the Balangiga bells in November 2018 and was present during the welcoming ceremony and handover of the bells in Villamor Airbase in December.

During the COVID-19 pandemic, Romualdez facilitated a deal with then-United States Secretary of State Mike Pompeo which was supposed to supply the Philippines with 10 million doses of the Pfizer–BioNTech COVID-19 vaccine as early as January 2021. However, the deal was reportedly "dropped" and delivery of the vaccines was pushed back to June 2021 reportedly due to Health Secretary Francisco Duque's failure to submit a confidentiality disclosure agreement (CDA). Aside from Pfizer, Romualdez was also instrumental in the talks to secure Moderna, Janssen, and Novavax vaccines to the country.

In April 2021, he presented his credentials as non-resident ambassador to the Governor-General of Saint Kitts and Nevis Tapley Seaton. The following month, he presented his credentials as non-resident ambassador to the Governor-General of Jamaica Patrick Allen. In a virtual ceremony, he presented his credentials as non-resident ambassador to the Governor-General of Saint Vincent and the Grenadines Susan Dougan in November 2021.

Romualdez's term as the ambassador to the United States was renewed in the administration of his second cousin, President Bongbong Marcos, for which he took his oath of office earlier on July 5, 2022, with his re-appointment being confirmed by the Commission on Appointments on August 31, 2022.

== Personal life ==
Romualdez is married to Maria Lourdes Marquez-Romualdez. They have four children.

He is an avid golfer and is affiliated with the Manila Golf and Country Club and the Manila Polo Club.
