= 2016 Tacloban local elections =

Philippine election

2016 Tacloban City mayoral election
- May 9, 2016
- Turnout: 85.34% (▲0.81 pp)
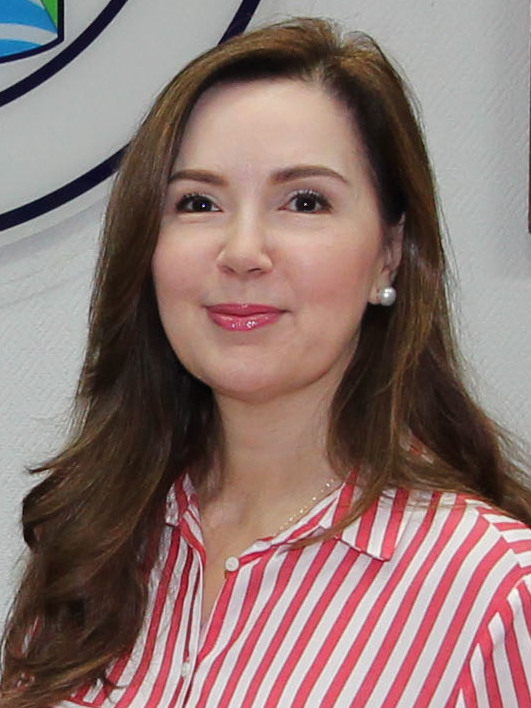
		NPC	IND
Nominee	Cristina Romualdez	Neil Glova	Golda Hilda Cabudoy
Party	Nacionalista	NPC	Independent
Running mate	Jerry Yaokasin	none	none
Popular vote	72,077	23,612	379
Percentage	67.69	22.18	0.36
Mayor before election
Alfred Romualdez
Nacionalista
Elected mayor
Cristina Romualdez
Nacionalista

Local elections in Tacloban City, Leyte were held on May 9, 2016 within the Philippine general election. The voters elected candidates for the elective local posts in the city: the mayor, vice mayor, and ten councilors.

106,480 voters participated in this election out of 124,777 total registered voters. The city's voter turnout is 85.34%.

== Background ==
Tacloban City Mayor Alfred Romualdez was on his third and final term as Mayor. His wife Cristina, currently a city councilor, ran for mayor under the Nacionalista Party. On October 16, 2015, she filed her COC for Mayor. She was opposed by incumbent councilor Neil Glova.

The incumbent vice mayor, Jerry "Sambo" Yaokasin, ran as independent. He was opposed by Ramon Tolibas, Jr. from the National Unity Party.

The number of candidates for this election is less than half than the number of candidates for the 2013 election. Some potential candidates did not have enough campaign funds due to the impact of Super Typhoon Yolanda in the city.

== Results ==
The candidates for mayor and vice mayor with the highest number of votes wins the seat; they are voted separately, therefore, they may be of different parties when elected.

=== Mayoral Election ===
Parties are as stated in their certificate of candidacies.

Tacloban City Mayoralty Election
Party	Candidate	Votes	%
Nacionalista	Cristina Romualdez	72,077	67.69%
NPC	Neil Glova	23,612	22.18%
Independent	Golda Hilda Cabudoy	379	0.36%
Margin of victory		48,465	45.52%
Invalid or blank votes		10,412	9.78%
Total votes		106,480	100.00%
Nacionalista hold			

=== Vice Mayoral Election ===
Parties are as stated in their certificate of candidacies. Jerry Yaokasin is the incumbent.

Tacloban City Vice Mayoralty Election
Party	Candidate	Votes	%
Independent	Jerry Yaokasin	71,219	66.88%
NUP	Ramon Tolibas Jr.	6,550	6.15%
Margin of victory		64,669	60.73%
Invalid or blank votes		28,711	26.96%
Total votes		106,480	100.00%
Independent hold			

=== City Council Election ===
Voters elected ten councilors to comprise the City Council or the Sangguniang Panlungsod. Candidates are voted for separately so winning candidates may come from different political parties. The ten candidates with the highest number of votes win the seats. For the tickets, names that are italicized were incumbents seeking reelection.

==== I Love Tacloban - Unity Team ====
I Love Tacloban - Unity Team
Name	Party
Maria Elvira Casal	UNA
Edward Frederick Chua	Nacionalista
Edwin Chua	Nacionalista
Victor Emmanuel Domingo	Nacionalista
Evangeline Esperas	UNA
Aurora Grafil	Nacionalista
Ferdinand Lomuntad	Independent
Rachelle Erica Pineda	Nacionalista

==== #TeamTaclobanon Ticket ====
Liberal Party/#TeamTaclobanon
Name	Party
Jose Mario Bagulaya	Liberal
Dalisay Erpe	Liberal
Hilario Menzon	Liberal
Jerry Uy	Liberal
Raissa Villasin	Liberal

Tacloban City Council Election
Party	Candidate	Votes	%
Nacionalista	Edwin Chua	71,140	66.81%
Liberal	Jerry Uy	64,151	60.25%
UNA	Maria Elvira Casal	63,864	59.98%
Nacionalista	Edward Frederick Chua	62,619	58.81%
Nacionalista	Victor Emmanuel Domingo	51,344	48.22%
UNA	Evangeline Esperas	49,100	46.11%
Nacionalista	Rachelle Erica Pineda	44,965	42.23%
Nacionalista	Aurora Grafil	43,579	40.93%
Liberal	Raissa Villasin	36,124	33.93%
Liberal	Jose Mario Bagulaya	32,383	30.41%
Liberal	Dalisay Erpe	31,436	29.52%
Liberal	Hilario Menzon	14,049	13.19%
Independent	Chrysanthemum Malate	13,603	12.78%
Independent	Ferdinand Lomuntad	11,705	10.99%
Independent	Ryan Allawan	7,011	6.58%
Independent	Roly Corpin	5,209	4.89%
Independent	Rodrigo Sabong	3,396	3.19%
Independent	Roman Becher	1,879	1.76%
Total votes		106,480	100.00%
