= 2022 Tacloban local elections =

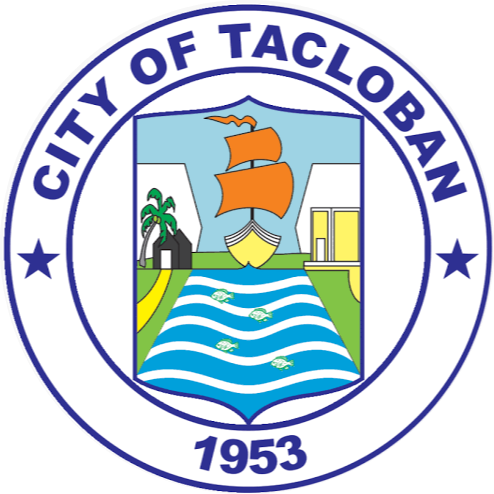
- May 9, 2022
- Registered: 143,562
- Turnout: 123,120(85.76%) ▲9.94p.p.
- 2022 Tacloban mayoral election
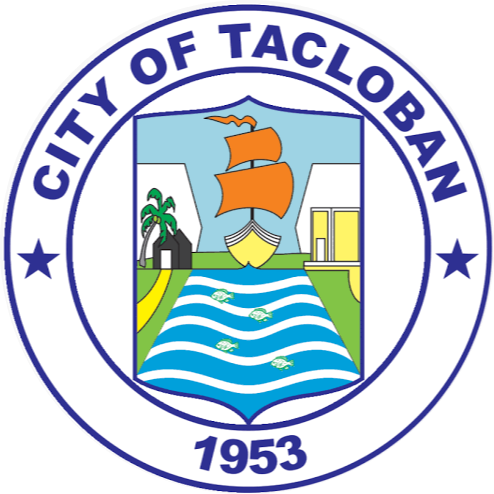
- May 9, 2022
- Opinion polls
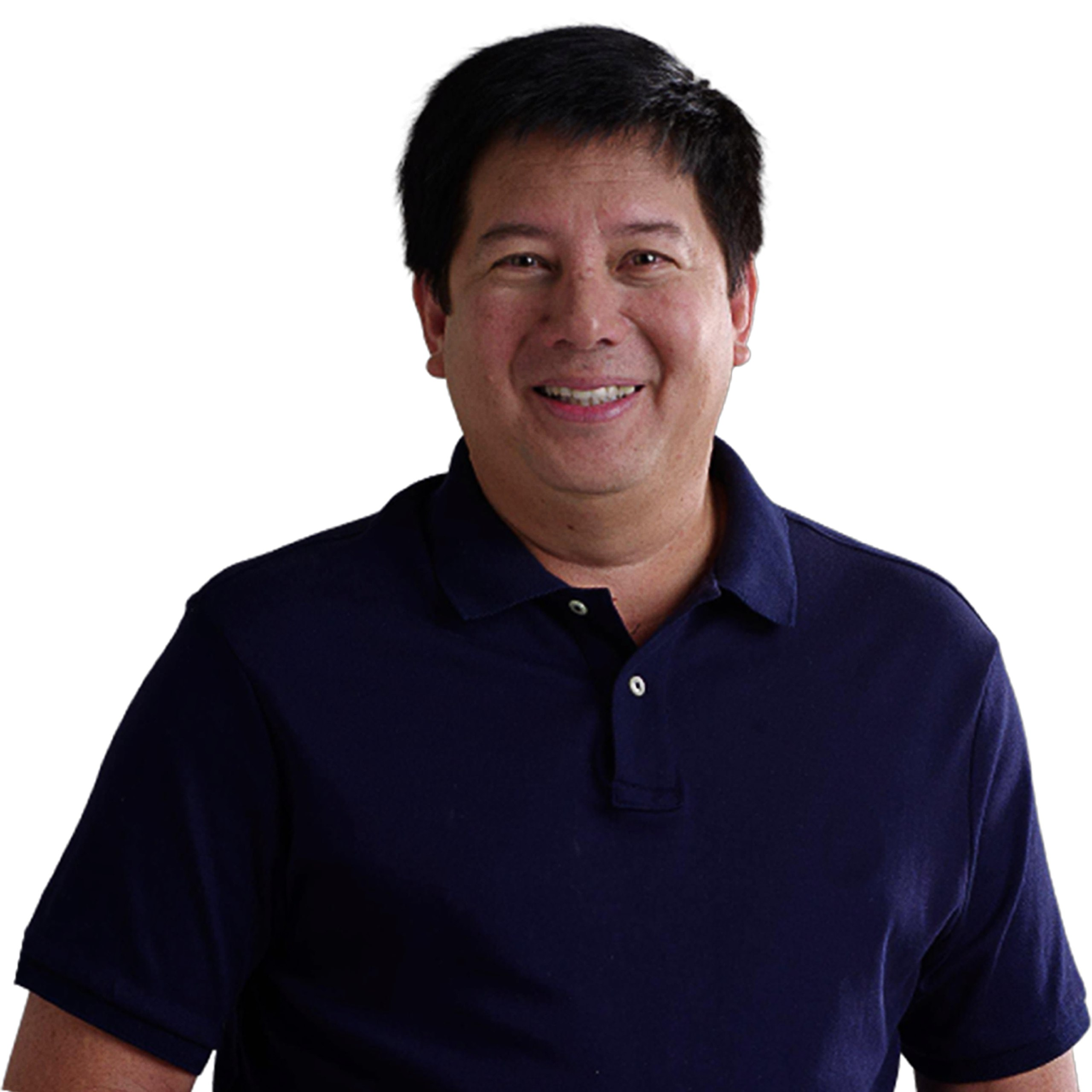
		IND	IND
Candidate	Alfred Romualdez	Jerry Yaokasin	Quintin Nilo Ayuste
Party	Nacionalista	Independent	Independent
Running mate	Raymund Romualdez	Edwin Chua	none
Popular vote	63,976	53,289	303
Percentage	51.96%	43.28%	0.25%
Mayor before election
Alfred Romualdez
Nacionalista
Elected mayor
Alfred Romualdez
Nacionalista
- 2022 Tacloban vice mayoral election
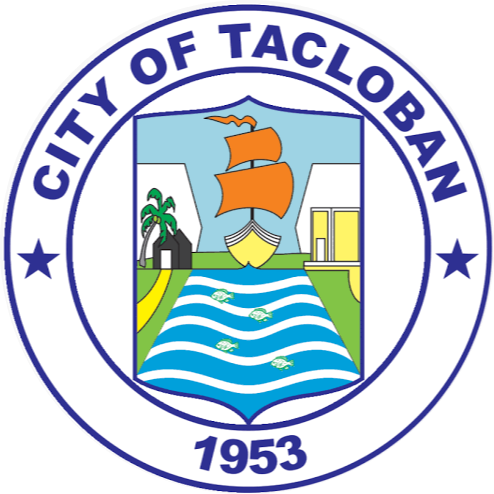
- May 9, 2022
- Opinion polls
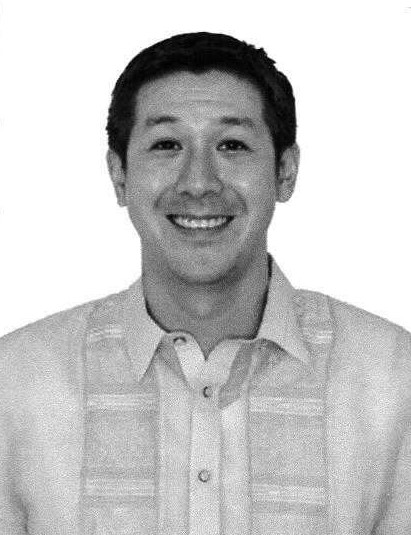
	AKSYON
Candidate	Edwin Chua	Raymund Romualdez
Party	Aksyon	Nacionalista
Popular vote	56,478	52,887
Percentage	45.87%	42.96%
Vice Mayor before election
Jerry Yaokasin
Independent
Elected Vice Mayor
Edwin Chua
Aksyon

Local elections in Tacloban City, Leyte were held on May 9, 2022, within the Philippine general election. Registered voters of the city elected candidates for the following elective local posts: mayor, vice mayor, and ten councilors. As part of Leyte's 1st congressional district, Tacloban City voters also elected a district representative.

There are 143,562 eligible voters in the city for this election, and according to partial and unofficial results, there were 123,120 votes cast, giving a voter turnout of 85.76%.

== Background ==
Incumbent mayor Alfred Romualdez of the Nacionalista Party filed his candidacy for a second consecutive term in this election. He was challenged by term-limited incumbent vice mayor Jerry Yaokasin, who ran as an independent. They were both unopposed in their respective races in the 2019 elections.

Mayor Romualdez was joined by his son, Raymund, as his running mate. Vice mayor Yaokasin chose former vice mayor and councilor Edwin Chua as his running mate. Romualdez and Chua were nominated by Nacionalista Party and Aksyon Demokratiko, respectively.

== Results ==
The candidates for mayor and vice mayor with the highest number of votes wins the seat; they are voted separately, therefore, they may be of different parties when elected.

=== Mayoral Election ===
Parties are as stated in their certificate of candidacies. Alfred Romualdez is the incumbent.

Tacloban City Mayoralty Election
Party	Candidate	Votes	%
Nacionalista	Alfred Romualdez	63,976	51.96%
Independent	Jerry Yaokasin	53,289	43.28%
Independent	Quintin Nilo Ayuste	303	0.25%
Margin of victory		10,687	8.68%
Invalid or blank votes		5,552	4.51%
Total votes		123,120	100.00%
Nacionalista hold			

=== Vice Mayoral Election ===
Parties are as stated in their certificate of candidacies.

Tacloban City Vice Mayoralty Election
Party	Candidate	Votes	%
Aksyon	Edwin Chua	56,478	45.87%
Nacionalista	Raymund Romualdez	52,887	42.96%
Margin of victory		3,591	2.92%
Invalid or blank votes		13,755	11.17%
Total votes		123,120	100.00%
Aksyon gain from Independent			

=== City Council Election ===
Voters elected ten councilors to comprise the City Council or the Sangguniang Panlungsod. Candidates are voted for separately so winning candidates may come from different political parties. The ten candidates with the highest number of votes win the seats. For the tickets, names that are italicized were incumbents seeking reelection.

==== Team Romualdez ====
Team Romualdez
Name	Party	Result
Leo Bahin	Tingog Sinirangan	Won
Elvie Casal	Nacionalista	Won
Chris Esperas	Nacionalista	Won
Abet Eviota	Independent	Lost
Aimee Grafil	Nacionalista	Won
Tata Granados	Nacionalista	Won
Yanyan Granados	Nacionalista	Won
Edson Malaki	Nacionalista	Won
Manix Marta	Nacionalista	Lost
Marvin Modelo	Nacionalista	Lost

==== Team Yaokasin ====
Team Yaokasin
Name	Party	Result
Lucky Bagulaya	Liberal	Lost
Edward Frederick Chua	Aksyon	Won
Neil Glova	KANP	Lost
Larry Portillo	Independent	Lost
Rachelle Erica Pineda	Aksyon	Won
Jerry Uy	KANP	Won

==== Results ====
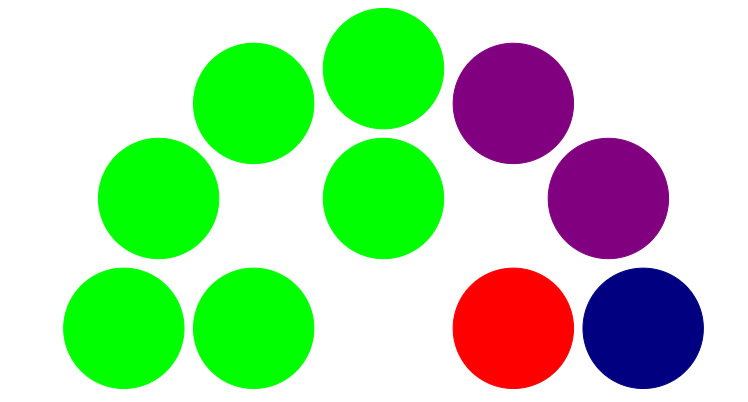
The Tacloban City Council from the 19th Congress

Tacloban City Council Election
Party	Candidate	Votes	%
KANP	Jerry Uy	60,477	49.12%
Aksyon	Edward Frederick Chua	60,065	48.79%
Nacionalista	Elvie Casal	59,015	47.93%
Nacionalista	Edson Malaki	52,546	42.68%
Nacionalista	Aimee Grafil	49,276	40.02%
Tingog Sinirangan	Leo Bahin	46,387	37.68%
Nacionalista	Yanyan Granados	46,338	37.64%
Nacionalista	Tata Granados	45,696	37.12%
Nacionalista	Chris Esperas	42,924	34.86%
Aksyon	Rachelle Erica Pineda	42,646	34.64%
Nacionalista	Marvin Modelo	38,016	30.88%
Liberal	Lucky Bagulaya	37,869	30.76%
KANP	Neil Glova	35,552	28.88%
Independent	Abet Eviota	32,870	26.70%
Independent	Larry Portillo	31,755	25.79%
Nacionalista	Manix Marta	25,478	20.69%
Independent	Jimmy Laurente	19,940	16.20%
Independent	Pax Paking Condalor	18,152	14.74%
Independent	Bomboy Lledo	9,029	7.33%
Independent	Renato Sipaco	5,113	4.15%
Independent	Jerry Borja	4,315	3.50%
Independent	Adrian Banzon	3,403	2.76%
Independent	Pastor Ricardo Pantoja	3,157	2.56%
Independent	Luther Loreno	2,969	2.41%
Independent	Tito Ayes	2,375	1.93%
Independent	Ervin Camenting	2,141	1.74%
Total votes		123,120	100.00%
