= Prostitution in Brunei =

Prostitution in Brunei is illegal and can incur a punishment of imprisonment for 1 year and a fine of BN$ 5,000 (3 703 US dollars) for a first offence, or 3 years and BN$ 10,000 (7 407 US dollars) on a second or subsequent conviction.

== Legislation ==
In 2016 a new penal code was introduced which applied Sharia law to the country. Prostitution is dealt with in two articles:

Prostitution

- 294A. Whoever —

(a) engages in, offers or agrees to engage in sexual services with another person for consideration; or
(b) loiters or solicits in any place for the purpose of prostitution or for any other immoral purpose,

shall be punished with imprisonment for a term not exceeding one year and fine of not less than $500 and not more than $5,000, and in the case of a second or subsequent conviction, imprisonment for a term not exceeding 3 years and with a fine of not less than $1,000 and not more than $10,000.

Paying for sexual services

- 294B. Whoever —

(a) intentionally obtains for himself the sexual services of another person; and
(b) before obtaining those services, he has made or promised payment for those services to A or a third person, or knows that another person has made or promised such a payment,

shall be punished with imprisonment for a term not exceeding one year and fine of not less than $1,000 and not more than $5,000, and in the case of a second or subsequent conviction, imprisonment for a term not exceeding 3 years and with a fine of not less than $2,000 and not more than $10,000.
(2) In this section, “payment” means any financial advantage, including the discharge of an obligation to pay or the provision of goods or services (including sexual services) gratuitously or at a discount.

== Scandals ==
=== Brunei beauties ===
In 1993, in a diplomatic affair dubbed the "Brunei beauties", Senator Ernesto Maceda, with testimony from Rosanna Roces, claimed that there was illegal recruitment of Filipinas in Brunei as prostitutes and entertainers. Prince Jefri, the brother of Sultan Hassanal Bolkiah was among those linked to the scandal, in which Ruffa Gutierrez, Vivian Velez, Lea Orosa, Aurora Sevilla, Sheila Israel, Rachel Lobangco, Tetchie Agbayani, Maritoni Fernandez, Gretchen Barretto, and Cristina Gonzales were alleged to be amongst the victims. The Philippine government downplayed the issue and described it as merely a "Senate affair" to safeguard relations between Brunei and the Philippines.

=== Shannon Marketic ===
In 1997 Shannon Marketic, a former Miss USA, sued Jefri Bolkiah, Prince of Brunei, claiming that she and other women were hired for promotional work but instead were held as "virtual prisoners", drugged and used as a sex slaves. The Sultan denied the claims. Marketic's lawsuit named Miss USA 1997 Brandi Sherwood as also being a victim, however Sherwood declined to file her own lawsuit. After 18 months of litigation, a judge dismissed the suit on the grounds that the sultan had sovereign immunity as head of state.

== Sex trafficking ==
Brunei is a destination and transit country for women and children subjected to sex trafficking. Some migrants who transit Brunei become victims of sex trafficking upon arrival in Malaysia or Indonesia. Some Bruneian women and girls are subjected to sex trafficking domestically. Retention of migrant workers’ travel documents by employers or agencies remains a widespread practice, although the law prohibits it.

In 2016 there were prosecutions against three Thai nationals for sex trafficking. Courts sentenced all three individuals to four years in prison and fines of US$22,250, US$14,836, and US$7,418, respectively, but all three accepted time added to their prison sentences ranging from 10 to 30 months in lieu of paying the fines.

The United States Department of State Office to Monitor and Combat Trafficking in Persons ranks Brunei as a 'Tier 2' country.
