= 2019 Tacloban local elections =

2019 Tacloban City mayoral election
- May 13, 2019
- Turnout: 75.82% (▼9.52 pp)
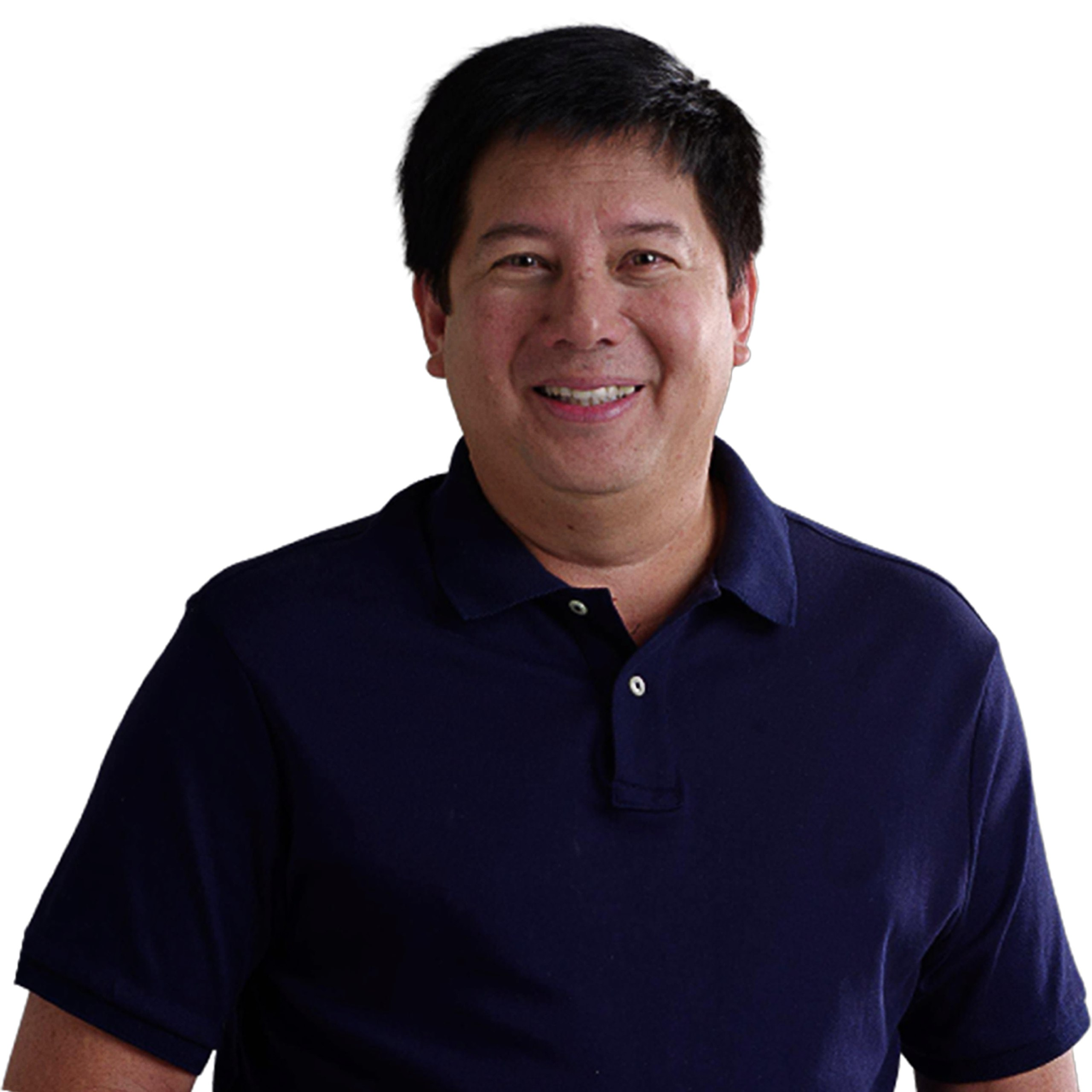
Nominee	Alfred Romualdez
Party	Nacionalista
Running mate	Jerry Yaokasin
Popular vote	73,930
Percentage	100.00
Mayor before election
Cristina Romualdez
Nacionalista
Elected mayor
Alfred Romualdez
Nacionalista

Local elections in Tacloban City, Leyte were held on May 13, 2019 within the Philippine general election. The voters elected candidates for the elective local posts in the city: the mayor, vice mayor, and ten councilors.

There were 139,423 eligible voters in the city for this election, and there were 105,704 votes cast, giving a voter turnout of 75.82%.

== Background ==
Incumbent Mayor Cristina Romualdez of the Nacionalista Party decided not to run for a second consecutive term in this election. Her husband, former Mayor Alfred Romualdez, was her party's nominee for the mayoralty post. No one filed their Certificate of Candidacy to oppose Romualdez. As such, he ran unopposed.

Incumbent Vice-Mayor Jerry Yaokasin ran as an independent for his third and final term as Vice-Mayor. He also ran unopposed.

== Results ==
The candidates for mayor and vice mayor with the highest number of votes wins the seat; they are voted separately, therefore, they may be of different parties when elected.

=== Mayoral Election ===
Parties are as stated in their certificate of candidacies.

- Tacloban City Mayoralty Election
  Party	Candidate	Votes	%
  Nacionalista	Alfred Romualdez	73,930	69.94%
  Invalid or blank votes		31,774	30.06%
  Total votes		105,704	100.00%
  Nacionalista hold			

=== Vice Mayoral Election ===
Parties are as stated in their certificate of candidacies. Jerry Yaokasin is the incumbent.

- Tacloban City Vice Mayoralty Election
  Party	Candidate	Votes	%
  Independent	Jerry Yaokasin	74,854	70.81%
  Invalid or blank votes		30,850	29.19%
  Total votes		105,704	100.00%
  Independent hold			

=== City Council Election ===
Voters elected ten councilors to comprise the City Council or the Sangguniang Panlungsod. Candidates are voted for separately so winning candidates may come from different political parties. The ten candidates with the highest number of votes win the seats. For the tickets, names that are italicized were incumbents seeking reelection.

==== Team Romualdez ====
Team Romualdez
Name	Party
Leo Bahin	Independent
Maria Elvira Casal	Nacionalista
Dalisay Erpe	Nacionalista
Evangeline Esperas	Nacionalista
Aurora Aimee Grafil	Nacionalista
Brian Steve Granados	Independent
Elizabeth Lesiguez	Independent
Marvin Modelo	Lakas
Rodolfo Padillo	Lakas
Elwina Pfleider	Nacionalista

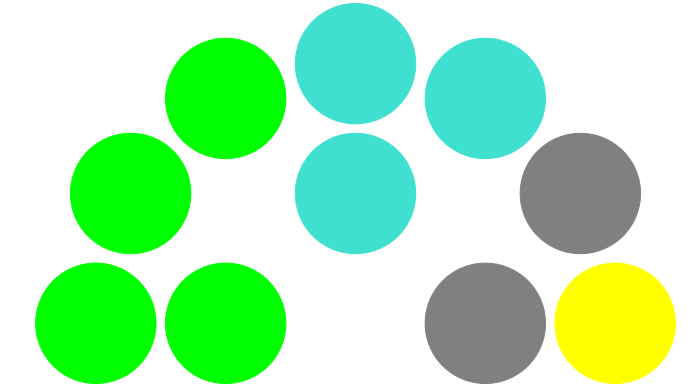

- Tacloban City Council Election
  Party	Candidate	Votes	%
  Nacionalista	Maria Elvira Casal	60,448	57.19%
  Lakas	Edmund Edward Chua	51,787	48.99%
  Lakas	Nikki Chua	48,359	45.75%
  Independent	Leo Bahin	47,599	45.03%
  Nacionalista	Evangeline Esperas	46,813	44.29%
  Nacionalista	Aurora Aimee Grafil	43,794	41.43%
  Nacionalista	Dalisay Erpe	41,690	39.44%
  Independent	Brian Steve Granados	40,467	38.28%
  Lakas	Rachelle Erica Pineda	38,699	36.61%
  Liberal	Jose Mario Bagulaya	33,882	32.05%
  Lakas	Marvin Modelo	31,050	29.37%
  Lakas	Rodolfo Padillo	30,231	28.60%
  Nacionalista	Melchor Cañete III	29,771	28.16%
  Liberal	Neil Glova	29,177	27.60%
  Nacionalista	Elwina Pfleider	27,170	25.70%
  Independent	Rolando Hidalgo	25,139	23.78%
  Independent	Elizabeth Lesiguez	9,400	8.89%
  Independent	Ryan Allawan	5,691	5.38%
  Independent	Ervin Camenting	3,382	3.20%
  Nacionalista	Dexter Brillo	3,146	2.98%
  Independent	Cristine Tinapan	2,245	2.12%
  Total votes		105,704	100.00%
