= List of ambassadors of the Philippines to the United States =

Ambassador of the Republic of the Philippines to the United States of America
- Sugo ng Republika ng Pilipinas sa Estados Unidos ng Amerika
- Seal of the Department of Foreign Affairs of the Philippines

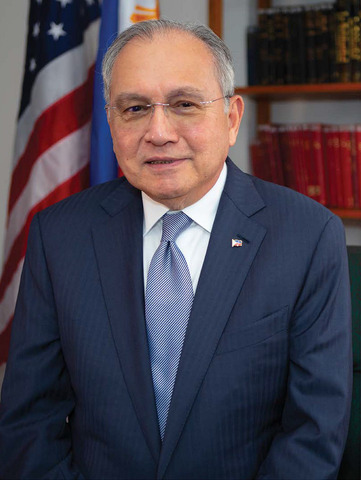
- Incumbent; Jose Manuel Romualdez since July 24, 2017
- Department of Foreign Affairs; Embassy of the Philippines, Washington, D.C.
- Style: His Excellency
- Reports to: Department of Foreign Affairs
- Residence: Emma S. Fitzhugh House
- Seat: 1600 Massachusetts Avenue, N.W., Washington D.C., United States
- Nominator: Secretary of Foreign Affairs
- Appointer: President of the Philippines; with the advice and consent of the Commission on Appointments
- Term length: No fixed term
- Inaugural holder: Joaquín Miguel Elizalde
- Formation: July 4, 1946
- Website: Philippine Embassy, Washington D.C.

The ambassador of the Republic of the Philippines to the United States of America (Filipino: Sugo ng Republika ng Pilipinas sa Estados Unidos ng Amerika) is the Republic of the Philippines' foremost diplomatic representative in the United States of America. As head of the Philippines' diplomatic mission there, the ambassador is the official representative of the president and the government of the Philippines to the president and government of the United States. The position has the rank and status of an ambassador extraordinary and plenipotentiary and is based at the embassy located at the 1600 Massachusetts Avenue, Northwest in Washington D.C. within its Embassy Row. The Philippine ambassador to the United States is also accredited as non-resident ambassador to various Caribbean countries.

The position is currently held by Jose Manuel Romualdez since July 24, 2017, of whom he presented his credentials to US President Donald Trump on November 29, 2017.

== Head of mission ==
Image	Head of mission	Tenure begins	Tenure ends	American president	Philippine president	Note(s)
	Joaquín Miguel Elizalde	1946	1952	Harry S. Truman	Manuel Roxas; Elpidio Quirino	First term. Previously served as Resident Commissioner of the Philippines from 1938 to 1944.
	Carlos P. Romulo	1952	1953	Harry S. Truman; Dwight D. Eisenhower	Elpidio Quirino; Ramon Magsaysay; Carlos P. Garcia; Diosdado Macapagal	First term. Previously served as Resident Commissioner of the Philippines from 1944 to its dissolution in 1946.
	Joaquín Miguel Elizalde	1953	1955	Harry S. Truman; Dwight D. Eisenhower	Elpidio Quirino; Ramon Magsaysay; Carlos P. Garcia; Diosdado Macapagal	Second term.
	Carlos P. Romulo	1955	1962	Dwight D. Eisenhower; John F. Kennedy	Elpidio Quirino; Ramon Magsaysay; Carlos P. Garcia; Diosdado Macapagal	Second term.
	Emilio Abello	February 1962	September 1962	John F. Kennedy; Lyndon B. Johnson	Elpidio Quirino; Ramon Magsaysay; Carlos P. Garcia; Diosdado Macapagal	
	Amelito Mutuc	September 1962	1964	John F. Kennedy; Lyndon B. Johnson	Elpidio Quirino; Ramon Magsaysay; Carlos P. Garcia; Diosdado Macapagal	
	Oscar Ledesma	1964	1966	Lyndon B. Johnson	Diosdado Macapagal; Ferdinand Marcos	
	Salvador P. Lopez	1968	1969	Lyndon B. Johnson	Ferdinand Marcos	
	Ernesto Lagdameo	1969	1971	Richard Nixon	Ferdinand Marcos	
	Eduardo Z. Romualdez	1971	1982	Richard Nixon; Gerald Ford; Jimmy Carter; Ronald Reagan	Ferdinand Marcos	Credentials were presented to President Nixon on October 31, 1971.
	Benjamin Romualdez	1982	1986	Ronald Reagan	Ferdinand Marcos; Corazon Aquino	Served as Ambassador of the Philippines to the People's Republic of China in the 1970s.
	Emmanuel Pelaez	1986	1992	Ronald Reagan; George H. W. Bush	Corazon Aquino; Fidel V. Ramos	Previously served as Vice President of the Philippines from 1961 to 1965.
	Pablo Suarez	1992	1993	George H.W. Bush; Bill Clinton	Fidel V. Ramos	
	Raul Rabe	1993	1999	Bill Clinton	Fidel V. Ramos	
	Ernesto M. Maceda	1999	2001	Bill Clinton	Joseph Estrada	
	Albert del Rosario	2001	2006	George W. Bush; Barack Obama	Gloria Macapagal Arroyo	Later served as Secretary of Foreign Affairs from 2011 to 2016.
	Willy C. Gaa	2006	2011	George W. Bush; Barack Obama	Gloria Macapagal Arroyo	Initially served as Chargé d'Affaires until promoted to Ambassador.
	Jose L. Cuisia Jr.	2011	2016	Barack Obama	Benigno S. Aquino III	Previously served as Governor of the Bangko Sentral ng Pilipinas (BSP) from 1990 to 1993; credentials were presented to President Obama on July 7, 2011.
	Jose Manuel Romualdez	2017	present	Donald Trump; Joe Biden; Donald Trump	Rodrigo Duterte; Bongbong Marcos	Appointed as Special Envoy until 2017; credentials were presented to President Trump on November 29, 2017.

== See also ==
- Philippines–United States relations
- List of ambassadors of the United States to the Philippines
- Resident Commissioner of the Philippines
