= 2013 Tacloban local elections =

2013 Tacloban City mayoral election
- May 13, 2013
- Turnout: 84.53%
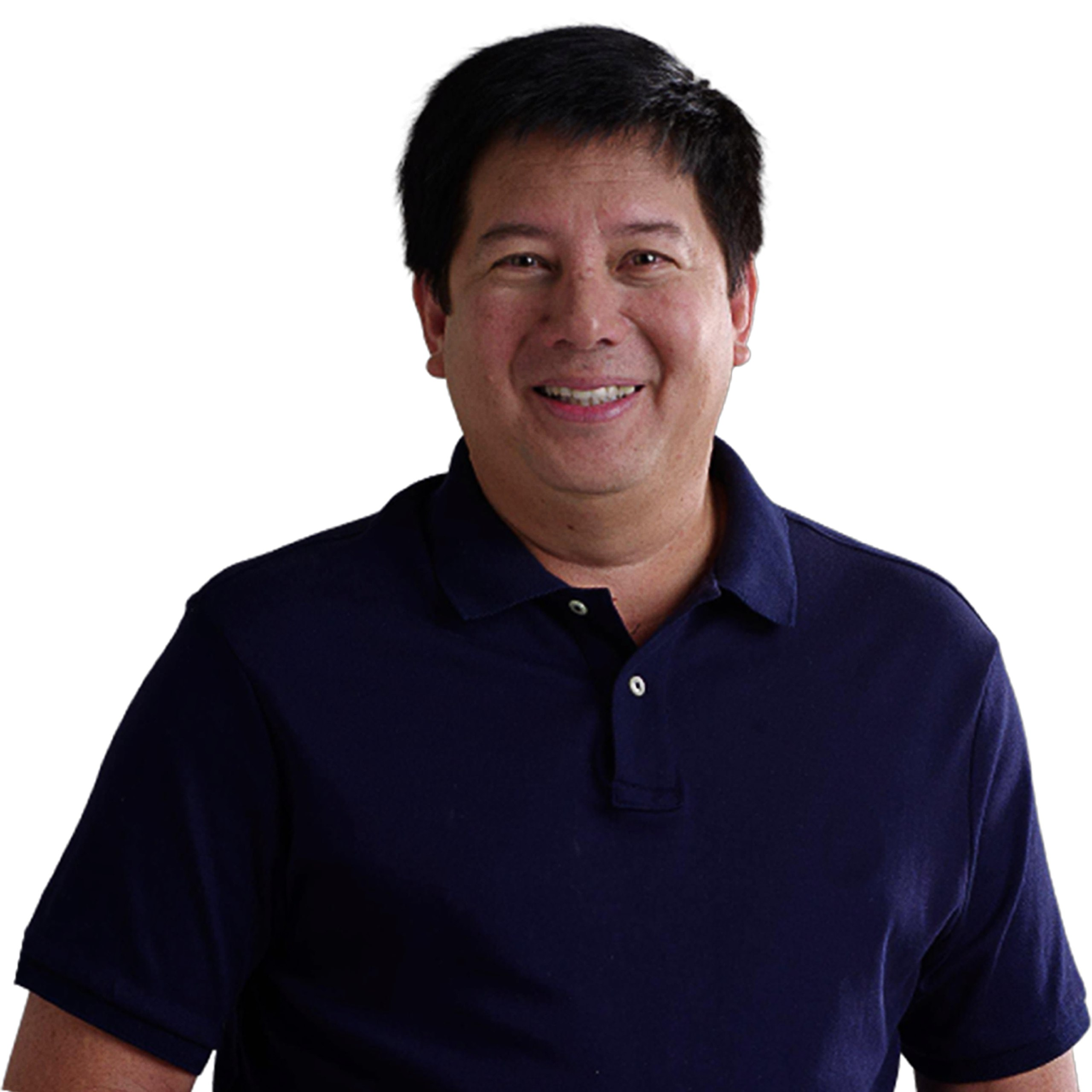

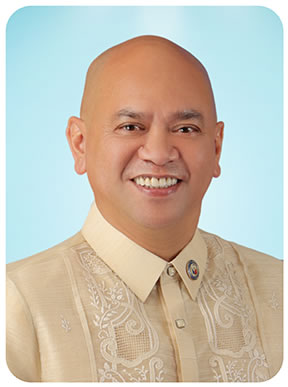
Nominee	Alfred Romualdez	Florencio Gabriel Noel
Party	Nacionalista	Independent
Running mate	none	Jose Arvin Antoni
Popular vote	46,856	39,631
Percentage	53.95%	45.64
Mayor before election
Alfred Romualdez
Nacionalista
Elected mayor
Alfred Romualdez
Nacionalista

Local elections in Tacloban were held on May 13, 2013, within the Philippine general election. The voters elected candidates for the elective local posts in the city: the mayor, vice mayor, and ten councilors.

There were 109,027 registered voters in the city for the elections, and 92,163 of them voted, giving a voter turnout of 84.53%.

== Background ==
Incumbent Tacloban City Mayor Alfred Romualdez filed to run for his third and final term as Mayor. He and his wife Cristina, an incumbent city councilor running for reelection, filed their respective certificates of candidacy on October 4, 2012. They ran under the Nacionalista Party. An Waray partylist Representative Florencio Gabriel Noel, who is term-limited, filed his certificate of candidacy to challenge Romualdez on October 3, 2012. He ran as an independent. His candidacy was supported by the administration of President Benigno Aquino III, with presidential sister Kris Aquino going to the city to personally campaign for him. Meanwhile, Nacionalista Party president and former Senate President Manny Villar, as well as senators Bongbong Marcos and Alan Peter Cayetano, endorsed partymate Mayor Romualdez and his slate.

Representative Noel's running mate was incumbent Vice Mayor Jose Arvin Antoni of the Liberal Party. Incumbent councilor Jerry "Sambo" Yaokasin, who is term-limited, ran for Vice Mayor as an independent.

== Results ==
The candidates for mayor and vice mayor with the highest number of votes wins the seat; they are voted separately, therefore, they may be of different parties when elected.

This election is notable for being the first time a transgender woman was elected in the city council. Jose Mario "Jom" Bagulaya placed 7th in the city council race, garnering 37,381 votes.

Note that full results are unavailable and figures are for the winning candidates only.

=== Mayoral Election ===
Parties are as stated in their certificate of candidacies. Alfred Romualdez is the incumbent.

Tacloban City Mayoralty Election
Party	Candidate	Votes	%
Nacionalista	Alfred Romualdez	46,856	53.95%
Independent	Florencio Gabriel Noel	39,631	45.64%
Independent	Ranulfo Feliciano	253	0.29%
Independent	Francisco Joseph Mercado, Jr.	103	0.12%
Invalid or blank votes		107,478	15.47%
Total votes		109,027	100.00%
Nacionalista hold			

=== Vice Mayoral Election ===
Parties are as stated in their certificate of candidacies. Jose Arvin Antoni is the incumbent.

Tacloban City Vice Mayoralty Election
Party	Candidate	Votes	%
Independent	Jerry Yaokasin	46,113	50.03%
Liberal	Jose Arvin Antoni	46,050	49.97%
Independent	Romeo Francisco		
Total votes		109,027	100.00%
Independent gain from Liberal			

=== City Council Election ===
Voters elected ten councilors to comprise the City Council or the Sangguniang Panlungsod. Candidates are voted for separately so winning candidates may come from different political parties. The ten candidates with the highest number of votes win the seats. For the tickets, names that are italicized were incumbents seeking reelection.

==== I Love Tacloban Slate ====
Nacionalista Party/I Love Tacloban
Name	Party
Ildebrando Bernadas	Nacionalista
Maria Elvira Casal	Nacionalista
Edward Frederick Chua	Nacionalista
Edwin Chua	Nacionalista
Victor Emmanuel Domingo	Nacionalista
Jeric Dane Granados	Nacionalista
Chrysanthemum Malate	Nacionalista
Noel Malate	Independent
Alfredo Padernos	Independent
Cristina Romualdez	Nacionalista

==== Bag-o nga Tacloban 12-0 Slate ====
Liberal Party/Bag-o nga Tacloban
Name	Party
Jose Mario Bagulaya	Liberal
Rudy Calabria	Liberal
Dalisay Erpe	Liberal
Evangeline Esperas	NPC
Neil Glova	Liberal
Cesar Separa	Liberal
Liberty Jane Sumayod	Liberal
Jerry Uy	Liberal
Raissa Villasin	Liberal
Ace Jackylyn Young	NPC

Tacloban City Council Election
Party	Candidate	Votes	%
Liberal	Jerry Uy	50,840	55.16%
Nacionalista	Cristina Romualdez	50,563	54.86%
Nacionalista	Edwin Chua	45,101	48.94%
Nacionalista	Edward Frederick Chua	43,086	46.75%
NPC	Evangeline Esperas	41,581	45.12%
Liberal	Dalisay Erpe	38,078	41.32%
Liberal	Jose Mario Bagulaya	37,381	40.56%
Nacionalista	Victor Emmanuel Domingo	33,440	36.28%
Liberal	Neil Glova	32,430	35.19%
Liberal	Raissa Villasin	30,638	33.24%
Makabayan	Joel Abaño		
Makabayan	Elmer Anota		
Makabayan	Efleda Bautista		
Independent	Roman Becher		
Nacionalista	Ildebrando Bernadas		
Liberal	Rudy Calabria		
Nacionalista	Maria Elvira Casal		
Nacionalista	Roberto Cecilia Jr.		
Independent	Danilo Chua		
Independent	Leonides Dacatimbang		
Independent	Rodrigo Duellosa		
Independent	Alex Duzar		
Nacionalista	Jeric Dane Granados		
PDP–Laban	Marie Marjorie Jaramilla		
Nacionalista	Chrysanthemum Malate		
Independent	Noel Malate		
Independent	Alfredo Padernos		
Liberal	Cesar Separa		
Independent	Renato Sipaco		
Liberal	Liberty Jane Sumayod		
Independent	Teofilo Tiu		
Independent	Federico Triste Jr.		
Independent	Robert Yap		
NPC	Ace Jackylyn Young		
Total votes		92,163	100.00%
