= Alberto Romualdez =

Filipino physician and government official (1940–2013)

Alberto Romualdez Jr.
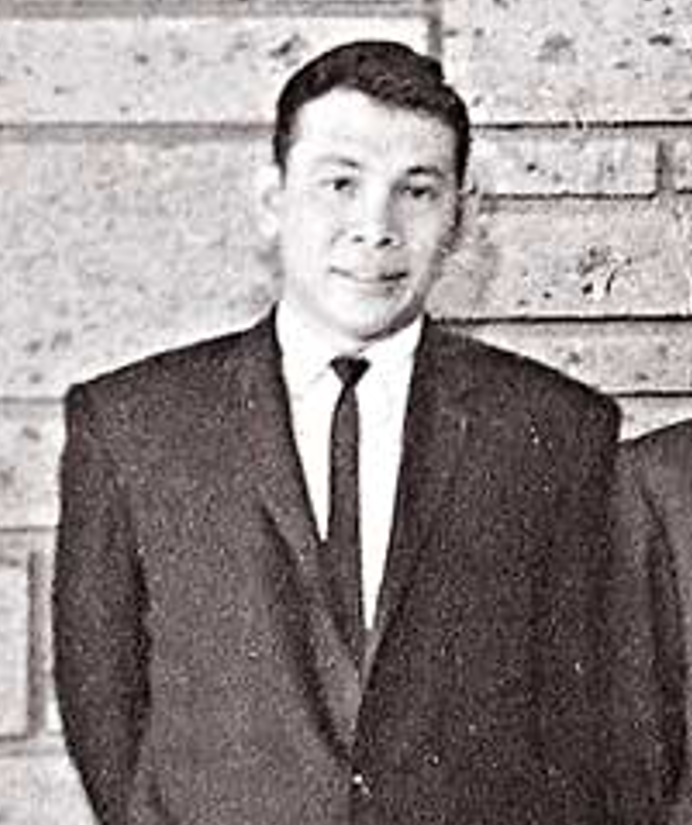

25th Secretary of Health
- In office September 14, 1998 – January 20, 2001
- President: Joseph Estrada
- Preceded by: Felipe Estrella
- Succeeded by: Manuel Dayrit

Personal details
- Born: Alberto del Gallego Romualdez Jr. September 14, 1940 Manila, Commonwealth of the Philippines
- Died: October 14, 2013 (aged 73) Manila Doctors Hospital, Manila, Philippines
- Education: Ateneo de Manila University (BA); University of the Philippines Manila (M.D); University of Connecticut; Harvard University

Alberto del Gallego Romualdez Jr. (September 14, 1940 – October 18, 2013) was a Filipino physician who served as the Secretary of Health from 1998 to 2001 in the Cabinet of President Joseph Estrada. From 1981 to 1984, he was the director of the Research Institute for Tropical Medicine. He was a member of the Romualdez political family.

== Early life and education ==
Romualdez was the eldest of the seven children of Alberto Zialcita Romualdez Sr., a former secretary general of the World Medical Association, and Covadonga del Gallego, a former chairman of the Pathology Department of the University of Santo Tomas Hospital. Among his siblings are footballer Johnny Romualdez and Philippine Ambassador to the United States Jose Manuel Romualdez.

He was a scion of the prominent Romualdez political clan of Manila and Leyte. His uncle Daniel Jr. was House Speaker from 1956 to 1962 while his grandfather Miguel served as Manila mayor during the American colonial period and Leyte assemblyman during the Commonwealth era. A great-uncle, Norberto Sr., served as justice of the Supreme Court.

He was also a distant nephew of former First Lady Imelda Marcos; his second cousins include Speaker Martin Romualdez, Chamber of Mines of the Philippines President Benjamin Philip Romualdez Jr., President Bongbong Marcos, Senator Imee Marcos and Tacloban Mayor Alfred Romualdez.

Romualdez earned his Bachelor of Arts in Biological Sciences from Ateneo de Manila University and his Doctor of Medicine degree from the University of the Philippines Manila. He had further education in the United States: Tumor Immunology at the University of Connecticut and Membrane Biophysics at Harvard Medical School.

== Career ==
His started working at the Department of Health as a Medical Adviser (1979–1982) for the Minister for Health. He was also the director of the Research Institute for Tropical Medicine between 1981 and 1984.

== Personal life and death ==
Romualdez was survived by his wife Peachy and their children. Romualdez died at the age of 73 on October 14, 2013, in Manila Doctors Hospital two days after a heart attack. The exact cause of death was not released by the media, but there were reports of his suffering from lymphoma.
