= Cristina Gonzales =

Filipina actress and politician

Cristina Gonzales Romualdez
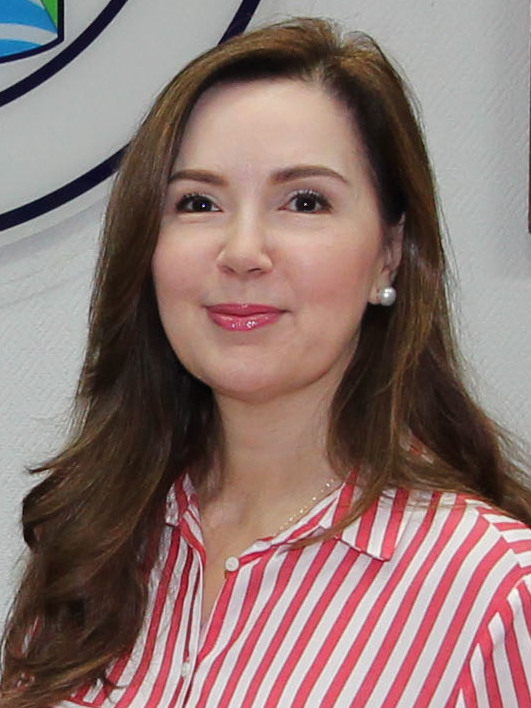
- Gonzales Romualdez in 2017

10th Mayor of Tacloban
- In office June 30, 2016 – June 30, 2019
- Vice Mayor: Jerry Yaokasin
- Preceded by: Alfred Romualdez
- Succeeded by: Alfred Romualdez

Member of the Sangguniang Panlungsod of Tacloban
- In office June 30, 2007 – June 30, 2016

Personal details
- Party: Nacionalista (2009–present)
- Other political affiliations: UNO (2006–2009)
- Spouse: Alfred S. Romualdez (m. 1998)
- Children: 2
- Occupation: Actress, former politician
- Nickname: Kring Kring

Cristina Malarky Gonzalez Romualdez is a Filipino actress and a former politician.

== Personal life ==
She is the daughter of actor José Mari Gonzales and Charito Malarky. She has a younger sister, Anna Margarita Gonzales, a former actress. Gonzales is of Spanish and British ancestry from her mother's side.

She is married to Alfred Romualdez (mayor of Tacloban City and nephew of Imelda Marcos). She served as city councilor from 2007 until 2016.

== Controversies ==
In 1993, in an affair dubbed as Brunei Beauties by the Philippine media, Cristina Gonzales were among the names linked to the controversy.

During the 2016 Philippine Election, her daughter Sofia, who was underage the time, posted an offensive tweet on Twitter regarding Camarines Sur 3rd District Representative Leni Robredo. In a post on her Facebook, Romualdez apologized and said she did not approve of the words her daughter used in the controversial Twitter post.

== Return to showbiz ==
After 15 years in politics, Gonzales signed with Viva Artists Agency last January 29, 2021 as she makes a showbiz comeback.

== Pageantry ==
Gonzales, joining her first beauty pageant, was crowned Noble Queen of the Universe in the pageant's fourth edition held in Tokyo, Japan on December 29, 2022, the second Filipina to won such after fellow actress Patricia Javier in 2019. Represented the Philippines (Visayas), she was also proclaimed Ambassador of Humanity.

== Electoral history ==
Electoral history of Cristina Gonzales
Year	Office	Party	Votes received				Result
Year	Office	Party	Total	%	P.	Swing	Result
2007	Councilor of Tacloban	UNO	48,732	—N/a	1st	—N/a	Won
2010	Councilor of Tacloban	Nacionalista	43,204	—N/a	2nd	—N/a	Won
2013	Councilor of Tacloban	Nacionalista	50,563	54.86%	2nd	—N/a	Won
2016	Mayor of Tacloban	Nacionalista	72,077	67.69%	1st	—N/a	Won

== Filmography ==
=== Film ===
Year	Film	Role
1988	Iyo ang Batas, Akin ang Katarungan	Rowena
1989	Wanted: Pamilya Banal	Kathy Banal
1989	Mula Paa Hanggang Ulo	Daria (Released Date: 19 August 1989)
1990	Nimfa	Nympha (Released Date: 10 May 1990)
1990	Flavor of the Month	
1990	Bikining Itim	
1990	Hanggang Saan Ang Tapang Mo	Flerida (Released Date: 20 September 1990)
1990	Lumaban Ka...Sagot Kita!	Aurora (Released Date: 18 October 1990)
1990	Bad Boy	Cecille (Released Date: 25 October 1990)
1991	Mahal Ko Ang Mister Mo	
1991	Mainit na Puso	
1991	Itakwil Man Ako ng Langit	
1991	Takas Sa Impyerno	Ester (Released Date: 30 March 1991)
1991	Sagad Hanggang Buto	Myrna (Released Date: 22 May 1991)
1991	Kalabang Mortal ni Baby Ama	Carmen
1991	Emma Salazar Case	Janet
1991	Andrew Ford Medina: Wag Kang Gamol!	Anna
1991	Cheeta-Eh: Gandang Lalake	Xuzixa
1991	Bad Girl	
1991	Pretty Boy Hoodlum	
1992	Big Boy Bato: Kilabot ng Kankalooo	Alda (Released Date: 1 July 1992)
1992	Nang Gabing Mamulat Si Eba	
1992	Lacson: Batas ng Navotas	
1992	Bad Boy II	Cecille
1992	Ang Katawan ni Sofia	Sofia
1992	Angelina: The Movie	Angelina
1992	Sana Kahit Minsan	Lualhati
1992	Kailangan Kita	Merle
1993	Patapon	Vicky
1993	Galvez: Hanggang Sa Dulo ng Mundo, Hahanapin Kita!	
1993	Sgt. Alvarez: Ex-Marine	Edna
1993	Kahit May Mahal Ka Nang Iba	
1993	Pedrito Masangkay: Walang Bakas na Iniwan	
1994	Lt. Col. Alejandro Yanquiling, WPD	
1995	Grepor Butch Belgica Story	
1995	Matinik na Kalaban	
1996	Bagamundo	
2021	Revirginized	Charlotte

=== Television ===
Year	Title of Television	Role
2021	FPJ's Ang Probinsyano	Amalia Mante
2022	Family Feud	Herself / Player
2025	FPJ's Batang Quiapo	Margaret

== See also ==
- Jasmin Selberg
