= Alfred Romualdez =

Filipino politician and businessman (born 1962)

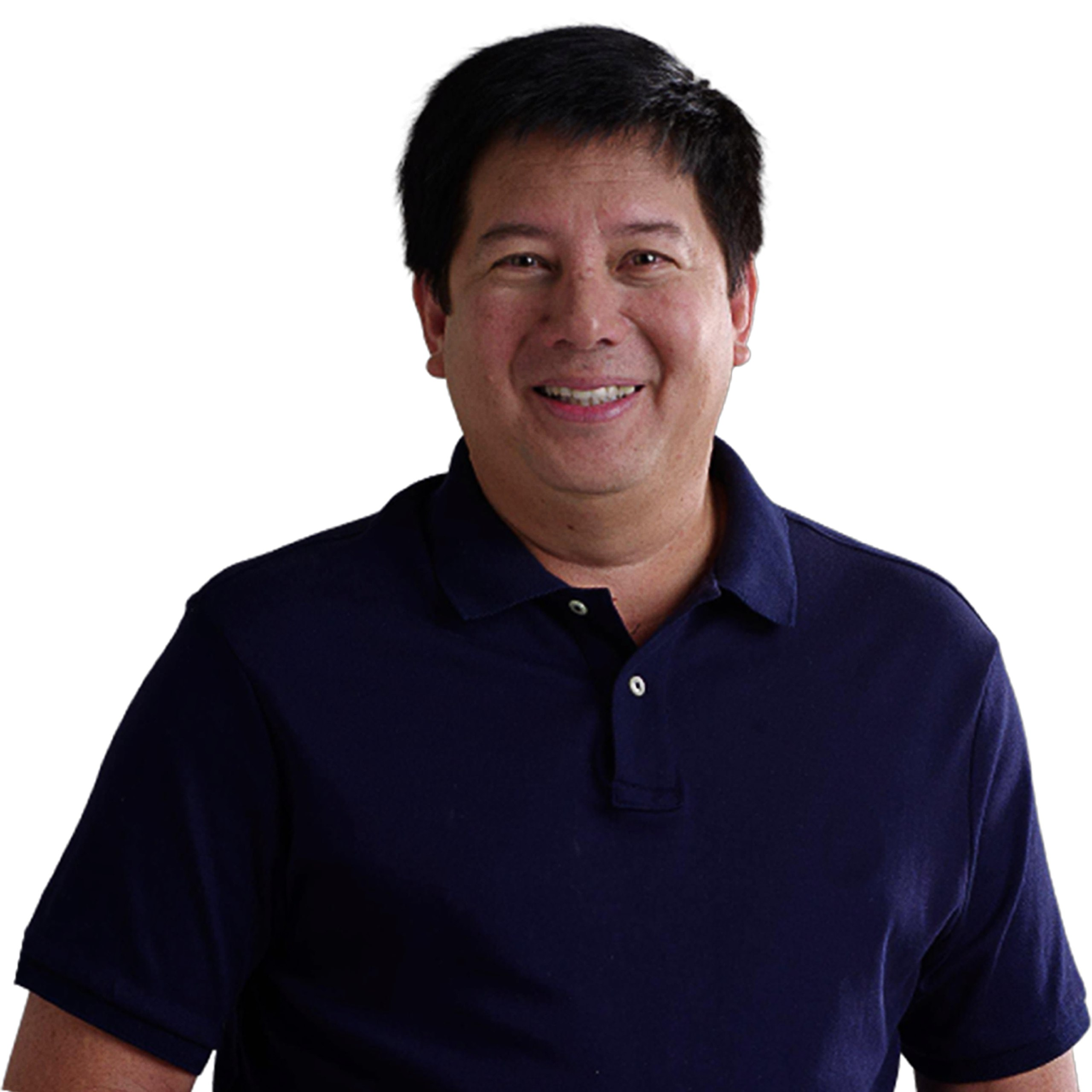
- Romualdez in 2015

9th and 11th Mayor of Tacloban
- Incumbent
- Assumed office June 30, 2019
- Vice Mayor: Jerry Yaokasin (2019–2022); Edwin Chua (2022–2025); Raymund Romualdez (2025–present)
- Preceded by: Cristina Gonzales
- In office June 30, 2007 – June 30, 2016
- Vice Mayor: Arvin Antoni
- Preceded by: Alfredo Romualdez
- Succeeded by: Cristina Gonzales

Member of the House of Representatives from Leyte’s 1st district
- In office June 30, 1998 – June 30, 2001
- Preceded by: Imelda Marcos
- Succeeded by: Ted Failon

Personal details
- Born: Alfred Sison Romualdez; January 14, 1962 (age 64) San Juan, Rizal, Philippines
- Party: Nacionalista (since 2012)
- Other political affiliations: Lakas (2007–2012); NPC (2001–2007); LAMMP (1998–2001)
- Spouse: Cristina Gonzales (m. 1998)
- Children: 3
- Relatives: Romualdez family
- Education: Ateneo de Manila University (BA); University of the Philippines Diliman (LLB)
- Occupation: Politician, businessman

Alfred Sison Romualdez (born January 14, 1962) is a Filipino politician and businessman. He has served as 11th mayor of Tacloban since 2019, a position he previously held as 9th mayor from 2007 to 2016. He represented the 1st district of Leyte from 1998 to 2001. He is the first cousin of President Bongbong Marcos and Representative Martin Romualdez.

== Early life and education ==
Romualdez was born on January 14, 1962, in San Juan (then-municipality of Rizal) to a prominent political family in Leyte. He is the son of Alfredo "Bejo" Trinidad Romualdez and Agnes Hernando Sison. He studied political science at the Ateneo de Manila University. He took up Bachelor of Laws at the University of the Philippines Diliman.

== Political career ==
=== House of Representatives ===
Romualdez was served as a representative for the first district of Leyte from 1998 to 2001 after he succeeded his aunt Imelda Marcos.

=== Mayor of Tacloban ===
In 2007, Romualdez was elected as mayor of Tacloban after he succeeded his father Alfredo Romualdez for three consecutive terms.

In 2019, Romualdez returned as mayor of Tacloban after he succeeded his wife Cristina Gonzales.

== Personal life ==
In 1998, Romualdez is married to Cristina Gonzales, where they have two daughters.

Romualdez has a son Raymund Romualdez, current vice mayor of Tacloban since 2025 from his ex-wife Teresita Albert.

== Electoral history ==
Electoral history of Alfred Romualdez
Year	Office	Party	Votes received				Result
Year	Office	Party	Total	%	P.	Swing	Result
1998	Representative (Leyte–1st)	LAMMP	66,488	55.16%	1st	—N/a	Won
2001	Representative (Leyte–1st)	NPC	51,308	—N/a	2nd	—N/a	Lost
2007	Mayor of Tacloban	Lakas	46,943	—N/a	1st	—N/a	Won
2010	Mayor of Tacloban	Lakas	53,304	—N/a	1st	—N/a	Won
2013	Mayor of Tacloban	Nacionalista	46,856	53.95%	1st	—N/a	Won
2019	Mayor of Tacloban	Nacionalista	73,930	100.00%	1st	—N/a	Unopposed
2022	Mayor of Tacloban	Nacionalista	63,976	51.96%	1st	—N/a	Won
2025	Mayor of Tacloban	Nacionalista	78,193	76.31%	1st	—N/a	Won
