= Johnny Romualdez =

Filipino football player

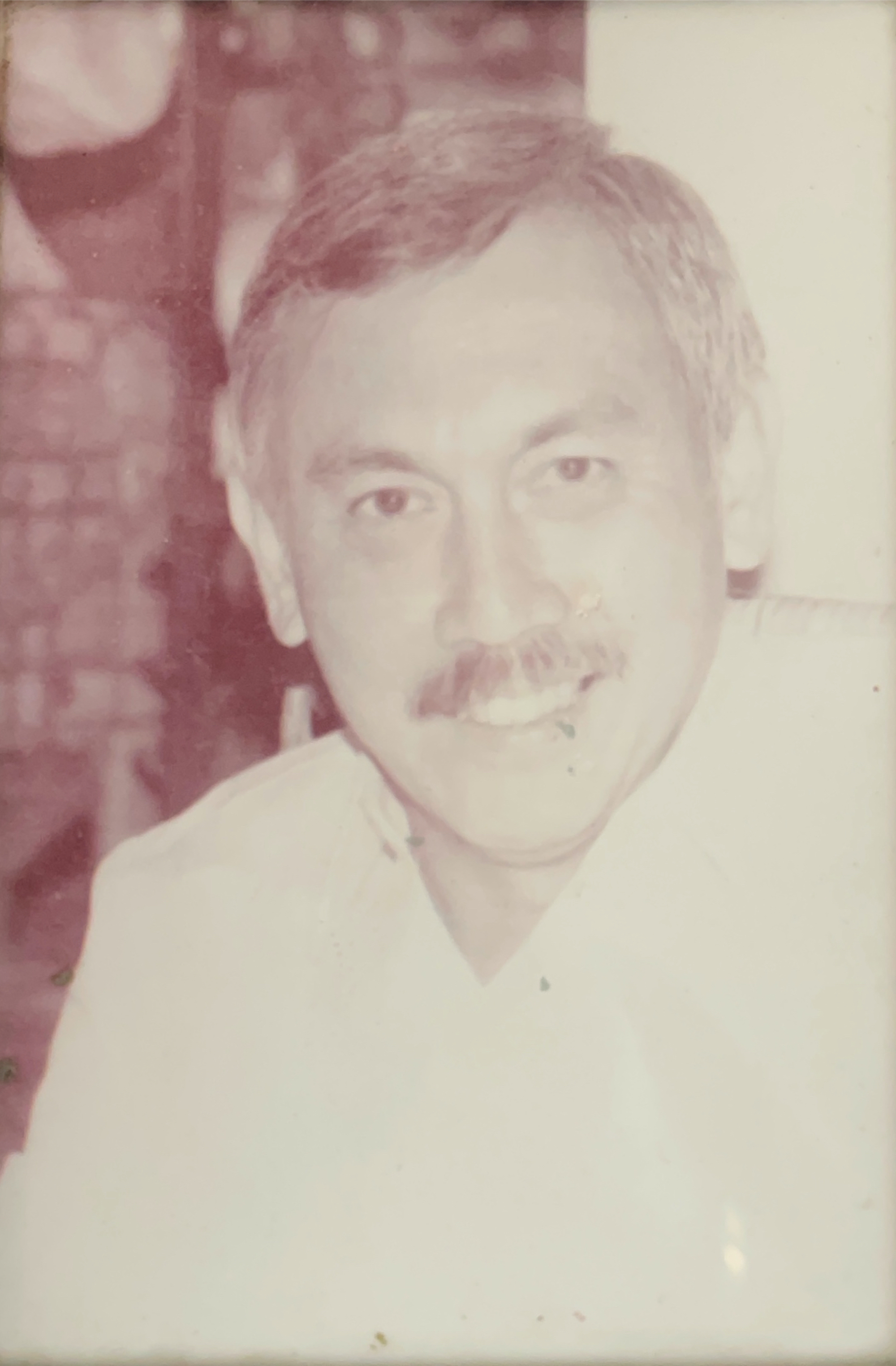

President of the Philippine Football Federation
- In office 2004–2008
- Preceded by: Rene Adad
- Succeeded by: Jose Mari Martinez

Personal details
- Born: Juan Miguel del Gallego Romualdez; September 15, 1941 (age 85)
- Citizenship: Philippines and Spain
- Education: Ateneo de Manila University
Association football career
College career
Years	Team	Apps	(Gls)
–	Ateneo de Manila University		
Senior career*
Years	Team	Apps	(Gls)
1959–65	YCO Athletic Club		
International career
1958–1960	Philippines youth		
1962–1967	Philippines		
- * Club domestic league appearances and goals

Juan Miguel "Johnny" del Gallego Romualdez is a former Philippine international footballer and former President of the Philippine Football Federation (PFF).

== Early life and education ==
Johnny Romualdez was born to a family of doctors and was the second eldest child among his six other siblings.

His father was Alberto Zialcita Romualdez (1913–1986), former Secretary General of the World Medical Association (1965–1973) and whose brother was Daniel Z. Romualdez, the 10th Speaker of the House of Representatives of the Philippines (1958–1962). His mother was Covadonga Ubante del Gallego (1915–2004), a former chairman of the Pathology Department of the University of Santo Tomas Hospital. His siblings include former Secretary of Health, Alberto Romualdez and Ambassador Jose Manuel Romualdez.

Romualdez attended Ateneo where he attained his Master of Business Administration. He started playing football at age 11. He studied at the institution from Grade 1. During his college years he received a scholarship from the YCO Athletic Club.

== Football career ==
Romualdez played football for the Ateneo Blue Eagles where he served as co-captain of the high school varsity team (1957–1958) and captain of the college varsity team (1961–1962). He was inducted into the Ateneo Hall of Fame in 1997.

He joined the national team in 1958 and was part of the squad that participated at the 1962 Asian Games. His last appearance was in 1967 at the 1968 Olympics qualifiers when he served as captain of the national team. The team suffered its worst defeat in a 0–15 match against Japan. He and a group of friends established the Blue Guards F.C. in the 1960s.

== Post-retirement ==
Romualdez was appointed as manager of the U-20 national football team which was organized under the Kasibulan grassroot program in the 1970s. He also ran several businesses in the mid-1970s. Romualdez also worked at the Philippine Football Federation and served as Executive Vice President. He was elected President of the football association in 2004.

== Personal life ==
His older brother, Alberto Romualdez Jr. (1940–2013), was regarded by many as the "Pioneer of Universal Health Care" and was the former Secretary of Health (1998–2001) of the Department of Health (Philippines) and a fellow on Tumor Immunology at the University of Connecticut and Membrane Biophysics at the Harvard Medical School. His grandfather, Miguel Lopez Romualdez (1882–1950) served as mayor of Manila (1924–1927) during the American colonial period and Assemblyman of Leyte during the Commonwealth Era.
