= Benjamin Romualdez =

Filipino politician (1930–2012)

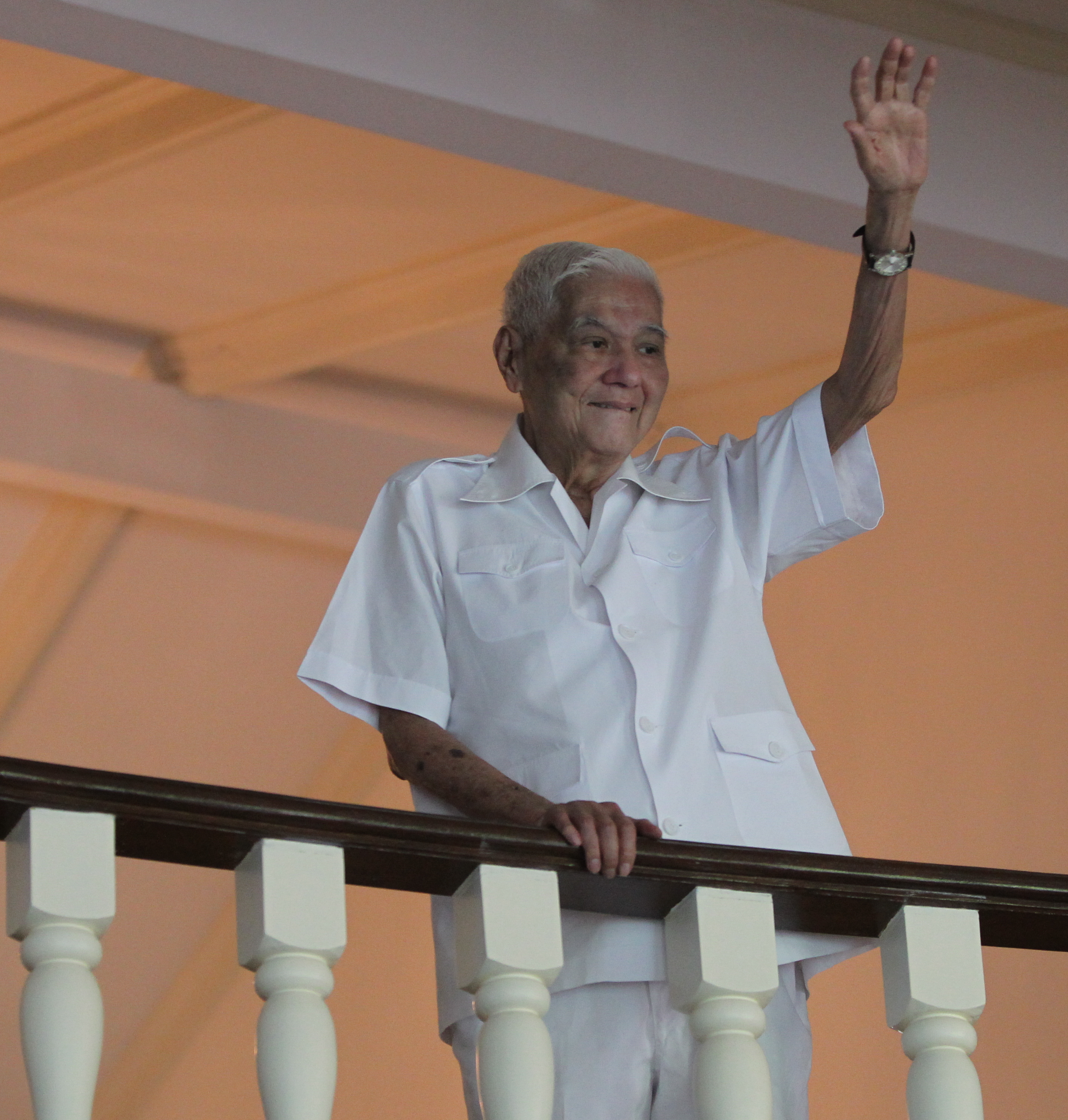
- Former Governor and Ambassador Benjamin "Kokoy" Romualdez on his 81st birthday

Governor of Leyte
- In office December 30, 1967 – March 25, 1986
- Preceded by: Norberto Romualdez Jr.
- Succeeded by: Benjamin P. Abella

Ambassador of the Philippines to the United States
- In office 1982–1986
- President: Ferdinand Marcos; Corazon Aquino
- Preceded by: Eduardo Romualdez
- Succeeded by: Emmanuel Pelaez

Member of the Regular Batasang Pambansa from Leyte
- Disqualified from taking office

Personal details
- Born: Carlos Benjamin Orestes Trinidad Romualdez; September 24, 1930 Manila, Philippine Islands
- Died: February 21, 2012 (aged 81) Makati, Philippines
- Resting place: The Heritage Park, Taguig, Metro Manila
- Party: Kilusang Bagong Lipunan (1978–1986); Nacionalista (1967–1978)
- Spouse: Juliette Gómez (m. 1958)
- Children: 4, including Martin
- Occupation: Politician

Carlos Benjamin Orestes "Kokoy" Trinidad Romualdez (September 24, 1930 – February 21, 2012) was a Filipino politician who served as Governor of Leyte and later appointed as ambassador to the United States, China and Saudi Arabia.

He was a younger brother to former first lady Imelda Romualdez Marcos and the father of former House Speaker Martin Romualdez.

== Personal life ==
The son of the late Vicente Orestes Romuáldez, a former dean of the law school of St. Paul's College in Tacloban, Kokoy Romualdez began his career in politics after serving as an assistant of Speaker Daniel Romualdez, his first cousin, from 1957 to 1961. He was a younger brother to former First Lady Imelda Marcos and the father of House Speaker Ferdinand Martin Romualdez. He was married to Juliette Gomez and their children are: Daniel, a practicing architect in New York, and partner Michael; Benjamin Philip, president and chief executive officer of Benguet Corp., who is married to Inquirer president and CEO Maria Alexandra; Ferdinand Martin, who is married to Yedda Marie; Marean, an investment banker, and husband Thomas; sisters Imelda Marcos, Alita Martel, Conchita Yap and brothers Alfredo and Armando.

He was part of the Romualdez Clan, the strongest political clan of Eastern Visayas. According to his niece Imee Marcos, their ancestors came from Northern Samar, settled in Leyte, and prospered in Tacloban. One of their ancestors was a part of the Sumuroy Revolt which started in Northern Samar.

== Political career ==
Romualdez embarked on his own career in the diplomatic service and in politics spanning more than 20 years. He served several terms as Leyte governor from 1967 to 1986. During this time, his brother-in-law, President Ferdinand Marcos also appointed him as ambassador to China, Saudi Arabia and the United States.

Romualdez was instrumental in the establishment of diplomatic relations between the Philippines and the People's Republic of China in the 1970s, becoming Manila's first ambassador to Beijing. He also led the Marcos government's negotiations with the United States regarding the renegotiation of the two countries' bases agreement.

He was elected as a member of the Batasang Pambansa in 1984, but chose to remain ambassador to the United States, and was therefore disqualified to sit in the parliament.

In 1986, he went into exile with his family following the People Power Revolution, and returned fourteen years later in 2000.

== Death ==
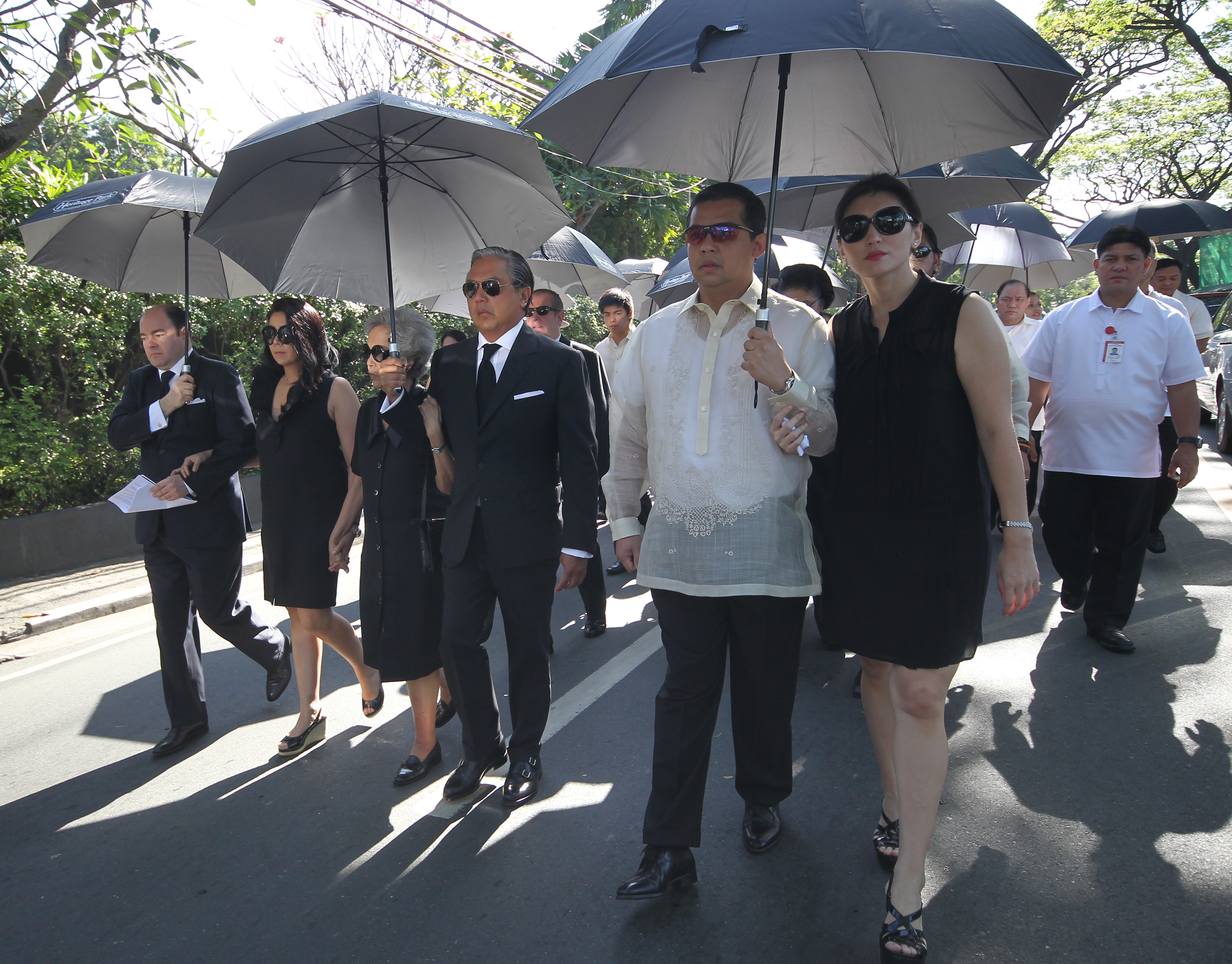
Romualdez's funeral

He died on the afternoon of February 21, 2012, of cancer, at Makati Medical Center in Makati at the age of 81. His remains were brought to Tacloban for a funeral and buried at the Heritage Park in Taguig on February 27.
