= Daniel Romualdez =

Speaker of the House of Representatives of the Philippines from 1958 to 1962

The Honorable Daniel Zialcita Romualdez
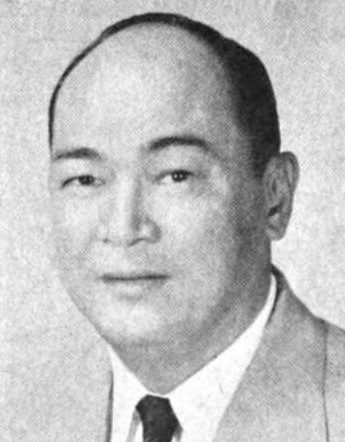

10th Speaker of the House of Representatives of the Philippines
- In office January 27, 1958 – March 9, 1962
- Preceded by: Jose Laurel Jr.
- Succeeded by: Cornelio Villareal

Speaker Pro Tempore of the Philippine House of Representatives
- In office January 25, 1954 – December 30, 1957
- Preceded by: Domingo Veloso
- Succeeded by: Constancio Castañeda

House Minority Leader
- In office March 9, 1962 – March 22, 1965
- Preceded by: Cornelio Villareal
- Succeeded by: Jose Laurel Jr.

Member of the House of Representatives from Leyte
- In office December 30, 1961 – March 22, 1965
- Preceded by: Marcelino Veloso
- Succeeded by: Artemio Mate
- Constituency: 1st district
- In office December 30, 1949 – December 30, 1961
- Preceded by: Juan Perez
- Succeeded by: Dominador Tan
- Constituency: 4th district

Personal details
- Born: Daniel Zialcita Romualdez; September 11, 1907 Tolosa, Leyte, Philippine Islands
- Died: March 22, 1965 (aged 57)
- Party: Nacionalista
- Education: University of Santo Tomas (LL.B)
- Occupation: Politician
- Profession: Lawyer

Daniel Zialcita Romualdez (September 11, 1907 – March 22, 1965) was a Filipino politician who served as Speaker of the House of Representatives of the Philippines from 1957 to 1962. He was first cousin to former First Lady Imelda Marcos.

== Early life ==
Daniel "Danieling" Romualdez was born in Tolosa, Leyte. He was enrolled at the University of Santo Tomas in Sampaloc, Manila and obtained his law degree in 1931.

== Ancestors ==
Romualdez' father was Don Miguel Lopez Romualdez, assemblyman for Leyte and Mayor of Manila during World War II. His mother was Brigida Zialcita of Manila.

Romualdez' father was the second of the three sons of Trinidad "Tidad" Lopez, eldest daughter of Spanish friar, Don Francisco Lopez of Granada, Spain (later of Burauen, Leyte), and Daniel Romuáldez of Pandacan, Manila, a tuberculosis survivor and Cabeza de Barangay. His paternal grandfather Daniel was owner of the Malacañang Gardens, the huge expanse of land dedicated to entertaining guests of Philippine presidents.

Philippine Supreme Court Associate Justice Norberto Romualdez was his uncle. Another uncle, Dean Vicente Orestes Romuáldez y Lopez, was the father of Imelda Marcos and grandfather of the current Tacloban Mayor Alfred Romualdez.

== Family ==
Romualdez' siblings include Attorney Estela Zialcita Romualdez Sulit married to Mariano Sulit, Miguel Zialcita Romualdez Jr. married to Cecilia Planas (distantly related to Rosario Planas), Alberto Zialcita Romualdez married to the Spanish mestiza Covadonga del Gallego of Paco, Manila (their son is former Department of Health Secretary Alberto Romualdez), Amelia Zialcita Romualdez Janairo married to ex- Philippine Army chief engineer and United States Army veteran Maximiano Janairo of Cavite and Virginia (both are buried in Arlington National Cemetery), Froilan Zialcita Romualdez married to Josefina Siervo and Philippine Central Bank Governor Eduardo Romualdez married to Concepcion Veloso, popularly nicknamed Conchita, who also hailed from a powerful Leyte political family.

He was married to Paz "Pacing" Gueco of Magalang, Pampanga, member of the Kahirup, an aunt of Benigno Aquino Jr. from nearby Concepcion, Tarlac, and heiress to vast tracts of ricelands from her Chinese-Filipino Gueco clan. He has four daughters.

Seeing the potential of his cousin Imelda Marcos, who was by then the undisputed Rose of Tacloban title holder and was renowned throughout the provinces for her singing voice, Danieling and other cousin Loreto Romualdez Ramos brought Imelda to Manila.

His first cousin once removed, Daniel Gomez Romualdez, was a New York City architect and son of former ambassador and governor Benjamin Trinidad Romualdez (brother of Imelda Marcos) and that of the son of Froilan Romualdez and Josefina Siervo named Daniel Siervo Romualdez.

== Political career ==
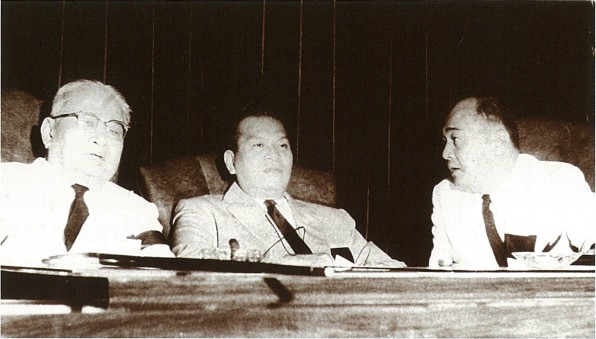
Romualdez (right) with President Ramon Magsaysay (center) and Senate President Eulogio Rodriguez (left)

Romualdezes were original members of the Nacionalista Party and his old home on Dapitan Street Extension, Quezon City, was its regular meeting place.

Romualdez first entered politics in 1949 when he was elected to represent the Fourth District of Leyte in the House of Representatives. A member of the Nacionalista Party, Romualdez was re-elected in 1953 and 1957. In 1961, Romualdez was elected Representative of the reapportioned First District of Leyte.

During the 3rd Congress of the Philippines, Romualdez served as Speaker Pro-Tempore. After House Speaker Jose Laurel Jr. vacated his congressional seat in 1957 following an unsuccessful bid for the Vice-Presidency, Romualdez replaced him as Speaker upon the opening of the 4th Congress in 1957. Romualdez served as Speaker until March 1962, when his Nacionalista Party ceded its congressional majority to the Liberal Party. Cornelio Villareal succeeded him as Speaker. Romualdez assumed the post of Minority Floor Leader, in which capacity he was serving upon his death in office from a heart attack in 1965.

== Notes ==
Political offices
Preceded by Jose Laurel, Jr.	Speaker of the House of Representatives; 1957–1961	Succeeded by Cornelio Villareal
House of Representatives of the Philippines
Preceded by Juan R. Perez	Representative, 4th district of Leyte; 1949–1961	Succeeded by Dominador M. Tan
Preceded by Marcelino R. Veloso	Representative, 1st district of Leyte; 1961–1965	Succeeded by Artemio E. Mate
