= Montebello =

Montebello may refer to:

== Places ==
=== Australasia ===
- Montebello Islands, Australia

=== Europe ===
- Montebello della Battaglia, Pavia, Italy
- Montebello Vicentino, Vicenza, Italy
- Montebello di Bertona, Abruzzo, Pescara, Italy
- Montebello Ionico, Calabria, Reggio Calabria, Italy
- Montebello sul Sangro, Abruzzo, Chieti, Italy
- Montebello, Norway, a neighborhood in the borough of Ullern in Oslo

=== Americas ===
- Montebello, California, United States
  - Montebello/Commerce station, a Metrolink train station
- Montebello, Quebec, Canada
  - Montebello station (Quebec)
- Montebello, Antioquia, Colombia
- Montebello Lakes National Park, Mexico
- Coldstream-Homestead-Montebello, Baltimore, a neighborhood of Baltimore, United States
- Montebello, New York, United States
- Montebello, Virginia, United States
- Montebello (Charlottesville, Virginia), a historic home
- Montebello Creek, a tributary of Stevens Creek in Santa Clara County, California
- Montebello, Nova Scotia, a neighbourhood of Dartmouth, Nova Scotia, Canada

== People ==
- Mark Montebello (b. 1964), Maltese philosopher and author
- Philippe de Montebello (b. 1936), French and American museum director
- Saviour Montebello (1762–1809), Maltese theologian, academic and leader in resistance against the French

== Other uses ==
- Montebello tenuis, a genus of Liocranid sac spider
- Montebello Castle, in Bellinzona, Switzerland
- Montebello (ship), several ships
- Battle of Montebello (disambiguation), two different battles
- Château Montebello, a hotel in Quebec, Canada

== See also ==
- Monte Bello (disambiguation)
