= Monte Bello =

Monte Bello, Italian for beautiful mountain, can refer to:

- Monte Bello Open Space Preserve in California, part of the Midpeninsula Regional Open Space District
- A wine label of Ridge Vineyards
- Monte Bello (Guayaquil), a neighborhood of Guayaquil, Ecuador
- Monte Bello, a barangay in Kananga, Leyte, The Philippines
- Monte Bellos, a homestead in Western Australia
- Monte Bello seahorse (Hippocampus montebelloensis)
- Monte Bello Ridge, an alternate name for Black Mountain in Santa Clara County, California

== See also ==
- Montebello (disambiguation)
