= 2017 Leyte earthquake =

Earthquake in the Philippines

- UTC time: 2017-07-06 08:03:57
- ISC event: 611600353
- USGS-ANSS: ComCat
- Local date: July 6, 2017
- Local time: 16:03:53 PST
- Magnitude: 6.5 M_{s}
- Depth: 2 km (1 mi)
- Epicenter: 11°07′N 124°41′E
- Fault: Philippine Fault – Leyte Segment
- Type: Tectonic
- Areas affected: Leyte; Samar; Bohol; Cebu
- Total damage: ₱271 million
- Max. intensity: MMI VIII (PEIS VII)
- Tsunami: No
- Landslides: Yes
- Aftershocks: 796+ (as of July 11, including the M5.4 aftershock)
- Casualties: 4 dead, 100+ injured

On July 6, 2017, a 6.5 magnitude earthquake hit Leyte, causing at least 4 deaths and 100 injuries. The quake also caused power interruptions in the whole of Eastern Visayas and nearby Bohol.

The Philippine archipelago is located in the Pacific Ring of Fire, where earthquakes and volcanic activity are common.

== Earthquake ==
The 6.5 magnitude earthquake was recorded by the Philippine Institute of Volcanology and Seismology (PHIVOLCS) to have occurred at 4:03:53 p.m. (16:03:53 UTC+8) and determined it to be of tectonic origin. PHIVOLCS recorded the depth of focus at 2 kilometers (1.2 mi) and its epicenter 8 kilometers (5.0 mi) south of Jaro.

| Intensity Scale | Location |
|---|---|
| VII | Ormoc City and Kananga, Leyte |
| VI | Jaro and Capoocan, Leyte |
| V | Palo, Leyte; Tacloban City; Cebu City; Mandaue City |
| IV | Catbalogan; Cabucgayan and Naval, Biliran; Tolosa and Bato, Leyte Hinunangan, Southern Leyte; Sagay City, Negros Occidental; Burgos, Surigao del Norte; Biliran, Leyte |
| III | Bogo and Talisay, Cebu; Roxas City; Iloilo City; Bacolod City; Inopacan and Baybay, Leyte; Sogod, Southern Leyte; Calatrava, Negros Occidental; Tagbilaran City; Jagna, Bohol; Borongan, Eastern Samar; Guihulngan City and Tayasan, Negros Oriental; Cadiz City and Toboso, Escalante, Negros Occidental |
| II | Libjo, San Jose, Cagdianao, Dinagat Islands; Sorsogon City; Lapu-lapu City; San Juan, Southern Leyte; Javier, Leyte; Tanjay City and Sibulan, Negros Oriental; Sorsogon City; Dumaguete |
| I | La Carlota City, Negros Occidental; Catarman, Northern Samar |

The United States Geological Survey (USGC) recorded the depth of focus for the earthquake at 6.5 kilometers (4.0 mi), deeper than what is recorded by PHIVOLCS.

The tremor was caused by the movement of the Leyte Segment of the Philippine Fault. A ground rupture was recorded in Barangay Tongonan in Ormoc which was described by the Department of Science and Technology as the epicenter area of the quake. As of July 9, PHIVOLCS was still assessing the extent of the rupture which could span 20 kilometers (12 mi) across the area.

No tsunami warning was raised by the Pacific Tsunami Warning Center.

== Damage ==
The Department of Public Works and Highways Leyte Fourth Engineering District announced on July 10, 2017, that they estimate that at least ₱271 million of damage was caused by the earthquake. The local agency said that the city of Ormoc, and nearby town Kananga sustained the heaviest damage.

The earthquake caused a building in Kananga to collapse, killing one person. Another person died in the town when a house collapsed in Ormoc. Another person was killed in a landslide in Ormoc while another body was found in the same city.

Authorities temporarily closed Ormoc Airport after its runway was damaged.

Ten schools located in the towns of Kananga, Jaro, Barugo, and San Isidro were destroyed by the earthquake while ten more schools located in Inopacan, Albuera, Mérida, Barugo, and San Miguel were partially damaged.

Leyte, Samar and Bohol experienced power blackouts while power supplies in Panay, Cebu, and Negros were also reportedly affected.

== Aftermath ==
PHIVOLCS recorded 796 aftershocks as of July 11, 2017. Ormoc and Kananga declared a state of calamity.

Residents in barangays Lake Danao and Tongonan in Ormoc were ordered to evacuate due to those localities being situated directly on the path of the Philippine Fault line.

On August 23, 2017, an aftershock of magnitude 5.1 occurred. This aftershock damaged 56 structures in Ormoc. Two people died, one after suffering a head injury after falling and another from a heart attack.

== See also ==
- List of earthquakes in 2017
- List of earthquakes in the Philippines
- 2013 Bohol earthquake
- 2025 Cebu earthquake
