= Hippocampus montebelloensis =

Scientific classification
- Kingdom: Animalia
- Phylum: Chordata
- Class: Actinopterygii
- Order: Syngnathiformes
- Family: Syngnathidae
- Genus: Hippocampus
- Species: H. montebelloensis

Binomial name
- Hippocampus montebelloensis Kuiter, 2001

Species of fish

Hippocampus montebelloensis, or the Montebello seahorse is a synonym of Hippocampus zebra, Whitley, 1964. It is known from Montebello Islands and Exmouth Gulf in Western Australia.
