= Kananga Special Economic Zone =

Kananga Special Economic Zone is a 300,408 square meters Special Economic Zone in Barangay Monte Bello, Kananga, Leyte, Philippines. The economic zone is the second in Leyte Province after the Leyte Industrial Development Estate in Isabel, Leyte.

The creation of the economic zone is in pursuance to Republic Act 7916 as amended by Republic Act 8748, which directs local governments to develop sites near or adjacent geothermal plants as economic zones. The proposed site is near the Leyte Geothermal Production Field in Tongonan, Kananga and Ormoc City.
