= Montebello (Charlottesville, Virginia) =

Historic house in Virginia, United States

- U.S. National Register of Historic Places
- Virginia Landmarks Register
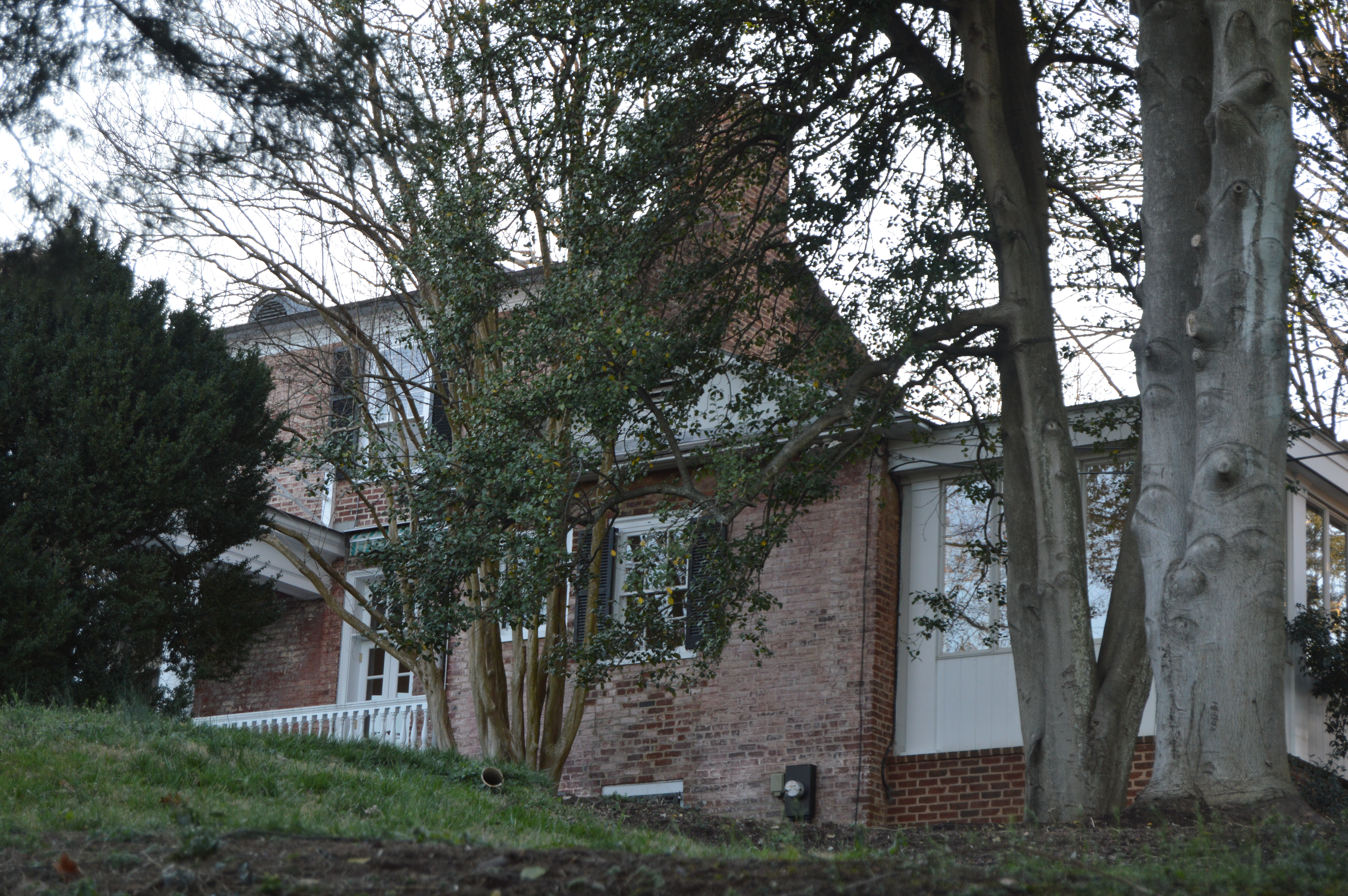
- Eastern front of the house

- Location within Virginia Location within the United States
- Location: 1700 Stadium Rd., Charlottesville, Virginia
- Coordinates: 38°1′50″N 78°30′36″W
- Area: 1.8 acres (0.73 ha)
- Built: 1819-1820
- Built by: John Perry
- Architectural style: Early Republic, Jeffersonian Classicism
- NRHP reference No.: 03001085
- VLR No.: 104-0043

Significant dates
- Added to NRHP: October 23, 2003
- Designated VLR: June 18, 2003

Montebello is a historic home located at 1700 Stadium Road, Charlottesville, Virginia. The central section was built in 1819–1820, and consists of three-part facade, with a three bay, two-story central block with single-story flanking wings. The original section has a single pile, brick I-house plan with a central hall flanked by a room on each side. Also on the property is a contributing 1 1/2-story, brick, two-car garage (c. 1920). The house was built by John M. Perry, one of the workmen who worked with Thomas Jefferson at Monticello and on his many building projects at the University of Virginia. The University of Virginia purchased the house and property in 1963 and it currently serves as a residence for faculty.

It was listed on the National Register of Historic Places in 2003.
