= Ormoc =

Independent component city in Eastern Visayas, Philippines

- Independent component city
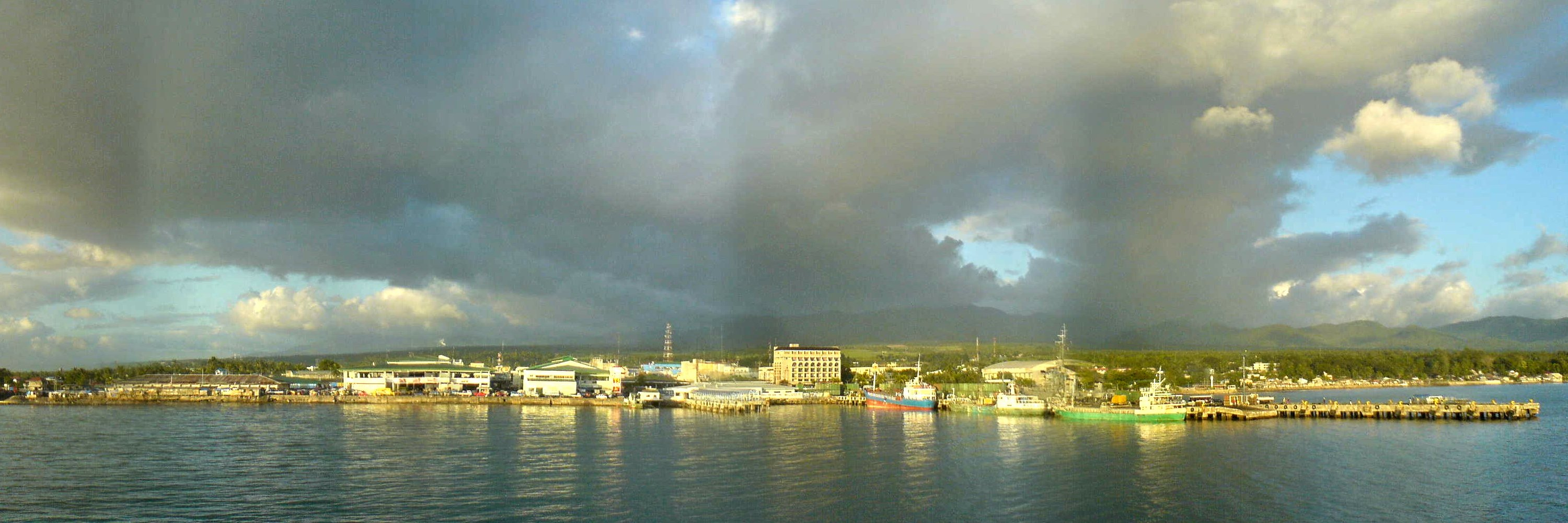
- View of Ormoc from Ormoc Bay

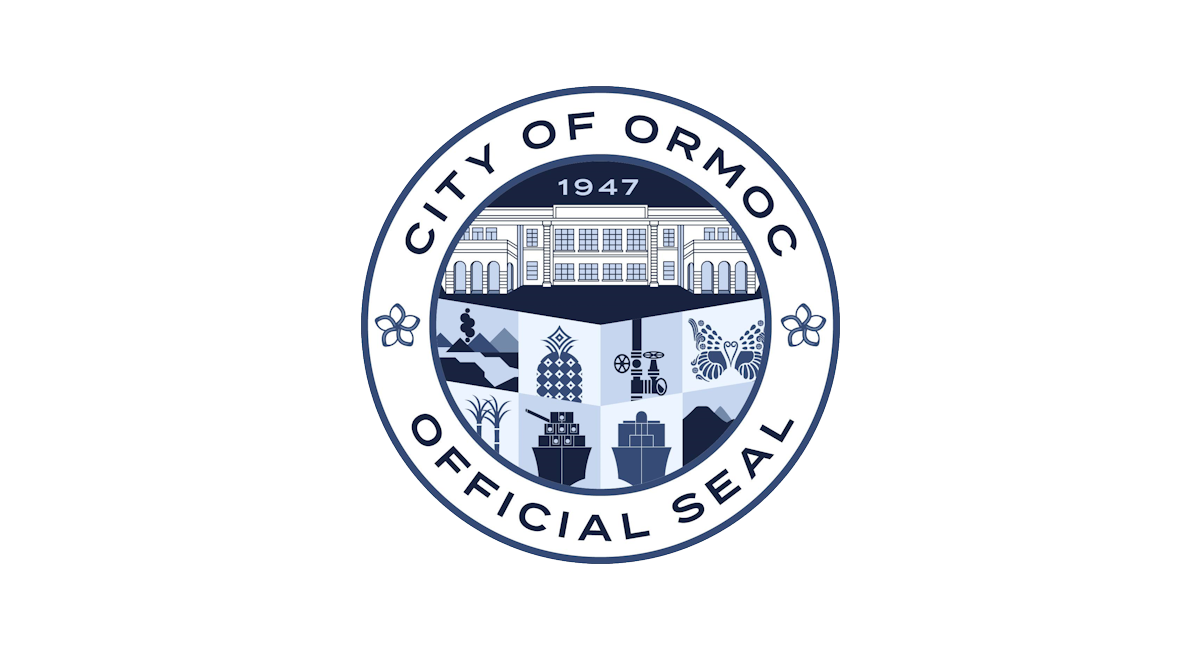
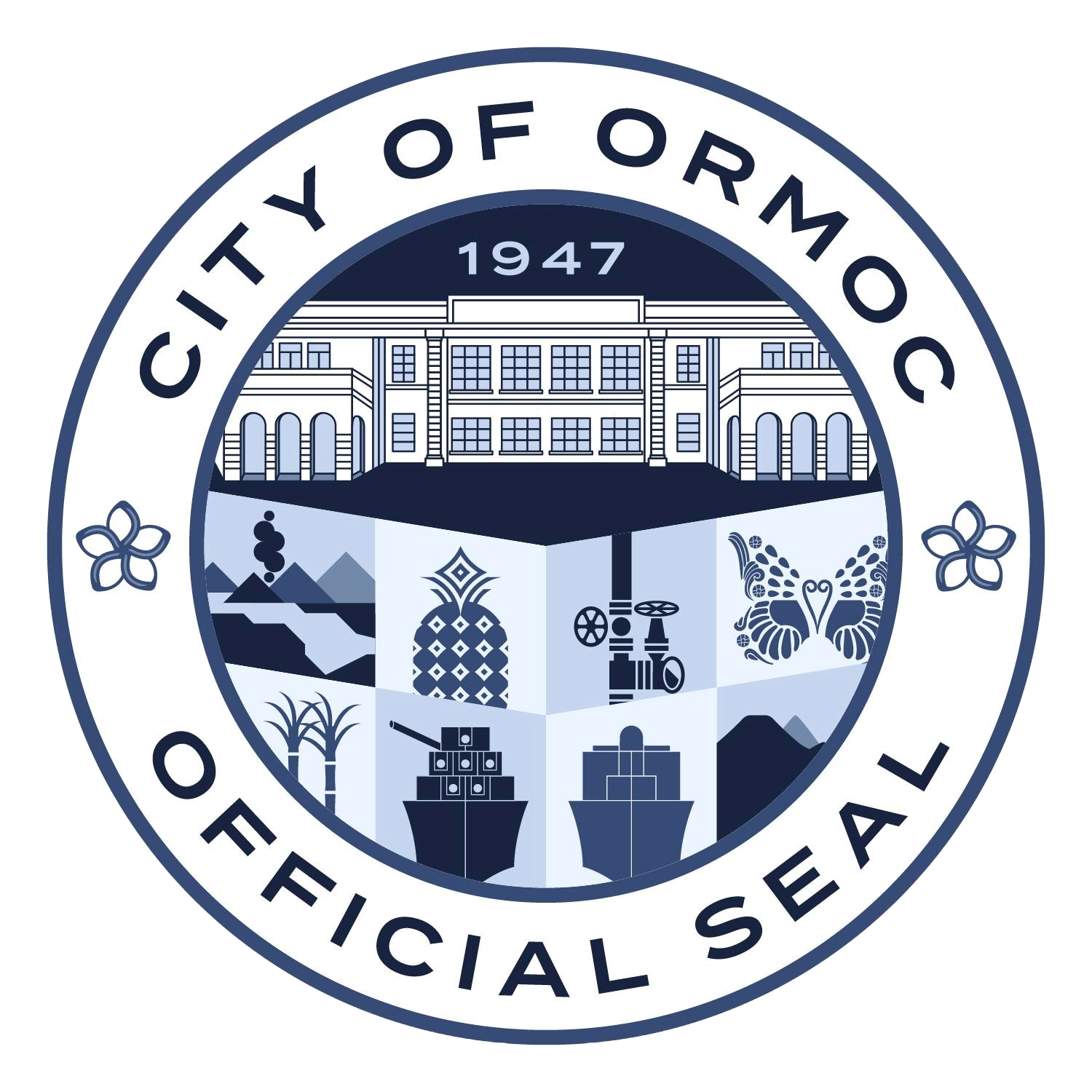
- Flag Seal
- Motto: Beautiful City of Beautiful People
- Anthem: Ormoc, Dutang Matahum (English: Ormoc, Beautiful Land)
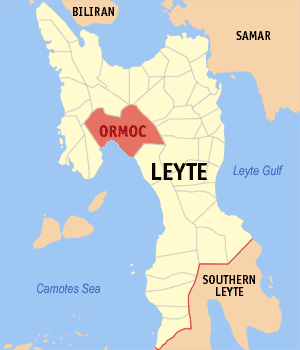
- Map of Leyte with Ormoc highlighted
- Interactive map of Ormoc
- Location within the Philippines
- Coordinates: 11°00′38″N 124°36′27″E
- Country: Philippines
- Region: Eastern Visayas
- Province: Leyte (geographically only)
- District: 4th district
- Founded: February 26, 1834
- Cityhood: June 21, 1947
- Barangays: 85 (see Barangays)

Government
  - Type: Sangguniang Panlungsod
  - Mayor: Lucy Torres-Gomez (PFP)
  - Vice Mayor: Leo Carmelo L. Locsin Jr. (PFP)
  - Representative: Richard I. Gomez (PFP)
  - City Council: List: • Roiland H. Villasencio; • Nolito M. Quilang; • Rey F. Evangelista; • Peter M. Rodriguez; • Gregorio G. Yrastorza III; • Jasper M. Lucero; • Ma. Carmen Jean T. Rama; • Edmund B. Kierulf; • Burt J. Pades; • Lalaine A. Marcos; DILG Masterlist of Officials
  - Electorate: 161,281 voters (2025)

Area
  - Total: 613.60 km^{2} (236.91 sq mi)
- Elevation: 234 m (768 ft)
- Highest elevation: 1,318 m (4,324 ft)
- Lowest elevation: 0 m (0 ft)

Population (2024 census)
  - Total: 238,545
  - Density: 388.76/km^{2} (1,006.9/sq mi)
  - Households: 56,048
- Demonym: Ormocanon

Economy
  - Income class: 1st city income class
  - Poverty incidence: 22.27% (2023)
  - Revenue: ₱ 2,289 million (2024)
  - Assets: ₱ 8,177 million (2024)
  - Expenditure: ₱ 2,322 million (2024)
  - Liabilities: ₱ 803.1 million (2024)

Service provider
  - Electricity: Leyte 5 Electric Cooperative (LEYECO 5)
- Time zone: UTC+8 (PST)
- ZIP code: 6541
- PSGC: 0803738000
- IDD : area code: +63 (0)53
- Native languages: Cebuano; Tagalog; Waray
- Website: www.ormoc.gov.ph

Ormoc (IPA: [ʔoɾˈmok]), officially the City of Ormoc (Cebuano: Dakbayan sa Ormoc; Waray: Syudad han Ormoc; Filipino: Lungsod ng Ormoc), is an independent component city in the Eastern Visayas region of the Philippines. According to the 2024 census, it has a population of 238,545 inhabitants, making it the second most-populous city in the province of Leyte after the provincial capital of Tacloban. Ormoc City is the economic, cultural, commercial and transportation hub of western Leyte.

Ormoc is an independent component city, not subject to regulation from the Provincial Government of Leyte. However, the city is part of the 4th Congressional District of Leyte together with Albuera, Kananga, Merida, Palompon and Isabel, and statistically grouped under the province by the Philippine Statistics Authority. On November 8, 2013, the city was extensively damaged by Super Typhoon Yolanda (Haiyan), having previously suffered severe destruction and loss of life in 1991 from torrential flooding during Tropical Storm Uring (Thelma).

== Etymology ==
The city's name is derived from ogmok, an archaic Visayan term for "lowland" or "depressed plain". The city also celebrates an annual thanksgiving festival called the Piña Festival in honor of the saints Peter and Paul in thanks for the bountiful pineapple harvest.

== History ==
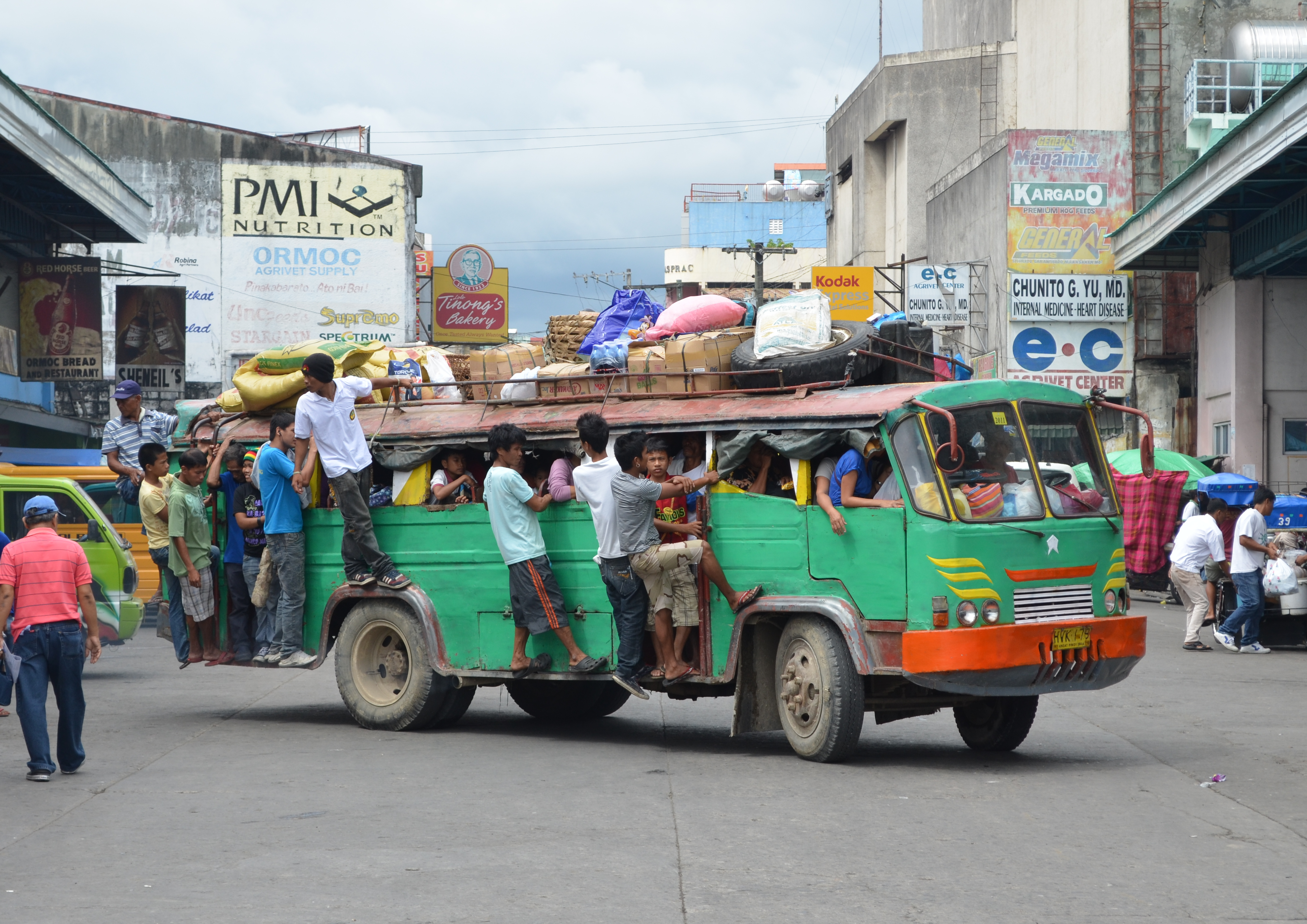
Ormoc Market scene

=== Early history ===
This place was used during the Spanish occupation and the migration of the neighboring towns to settle in the more fertile plains of Ormoc. Much of the settlers in the town were Visayans. These people had a constant trading with the Chinese, Malays, and the Javanese. Their living, however, was always threatened by the attack of the Moro pirates. As a result, The Visayan people in Ormoc developed "grapevine". a warning system communication used from people manning watch towers to inform and warn the people of the coming of these pirates.

=== Spanish Period ===
July 16, 1595, Pedro Cherino and the Jesuit missionaries arrived in Leyte. On May 1597, a mission in Ormoc was established by these missionaries. That year, the locals were converted to Christianity. Years of peace was shortly disturbed when in year 1634, the sultan of Sulu, Raja Bungsu captured 300 natives after invading the town. The towns of Sogod, Kabalian, Inopacan and Baybay were also invaded and plundered. The locals of Ormoc fought Raja and his men but because they were outnumbered, they were massacred to the last man.

In 1768. The Jesuits were replaced by Augustinian missionaries. On February 26, 1834, Ormoc was separated into a municipality from Palompon.

=== Philippine Revolution ===
Ormoc was a hotbed of revolutionaries seeking independence from Spanish rule. from which they would take part a few months after the outbreak of the Philippine Revolution that occurred on August 1896. In which Leyte was in control from the Revolutionary Government controlled by Vicente Lukban.

=== Early American Period ===
After the fall of the Revolution. A civil government was established on Leyte on April 22, 1901, when the Filipinos were under the authority of the Americans. from which the revolutionary leader Faustino Ablen inspired locals to join the Pulahan Movement. In 1903, the municipality of Albuera was consolidated into Ormoc.

=== World War II ===
After the Japanese Occupation and a rule of Second Philippine Republic. Ormoc is a garrison of small divisions of the Imperial Japanese Army. With the Allies near the city. Japan began to reinforce the city and the Battle of Ormoc Bay begins. The city is liberated afterwards.

=== Cityhood ===
Ormoc became a city by virtue of Republic Act No. 179 on October 20, 1947, becoming the fifteenth city in the Philippines and the first in the Eastern Visayas region.

Kananga was created in 1950 from the barrios of Lonoy, Kananga, Rizal, Tugbong, Montebello, Aguiting, Tagaytay, Montealegre, Libungao, Naghalin, and Masarayao which all used to be part of Ormoc City.

=== 1991 Flash Flood ===
On the morning of November 5, 1991, the Ormoc region was inundated by Tropical Storm Uring. The city government recorded 4,922 deaths, 3,000 missing persons, 14,000 destroyed houses and more than P600 million worth of damaged property. None of the 3,000 missing persons were ever found and are now presumed dead. Illegal logging and kaingin (slash-and-burn farming) were blamed as the reasons of the flood. Heavy rainfall caused water to collect upstream the Anilao and Malbasag rivers until it poured to the lowlands in Ormoc, particularly District 26, also known as Isla Verde.

On November 5, 2011, a monument by national artist Francis Cinco commemorating the 20th anniversary of the event was inaugurated. It sits on top of the mass grave at the Ormoc City Public Cemetery where an estimated 4,900 victims are buried. The sculpture, entitled "Gift of Life", is an abstract depicting a life taken to heaven.

=== 2013 Super Typhoon Haiyan ===
On November 7, 2013, Typhoon Haiyan, one of the most powerful tropical cyclones ever recorded, made a landfall in the Philippines. While it killed far fewer people as Tropical Storm Uring, it left widespread devastation to the city with destruction and damages in 90% of its structures.

=== 2022 plebiscite ===
On January 19, 2021, the City Council enacted Ordinance 52 Series of 2021 to merge the numbered barangays (all in Poblacion) and renaming them:

- Barangays 1–8, 12, 13, 15, 17, 23 & 27 shall be merged to form a single unit to be named as Barangay South;
- Brgys. 9–11, 16, 18, 25 & 28 as Brgy. East;
- Brgys. 14, 19–22, 24 & 26 as Brgy. West; and
- Brgy. 29 will be renamed as Brgy. North.

The ordinance require a plebiscite and the determination of an affirmation will be based on the majority vote of the proposed administrative subdivision and not a majority vote per barangay. This is to avoid creation of enclaves and exclaves. Then mayor Richard Gomez approved the ordinance on January 22, 2021. On June 22, 2022, the Commission on Elections through Resolution No. 10796 set the plebiscite on October 8.

The plebiscite was held at the Ormoc City Central School, with 35 polling precincts, wherein 10,209 registered voters from 29 barangays were expected to participate. With a voter turnout of more than half, majority of them approved the reorganization.

2022 plebiscite for Ordinance no. 52, s. 2021
Choice	Votes	%
For	4,767	89.86
Against	538	10.14
Required majority		50.00
Total	5,305	100.00
Valid votes	5,305	99.59
Invalid/blank votes	22	0.41
Total votes	5,327	100.00
Registered voters/turnout	10,209	52.18
Source: (1) (2) (3)

Results by proposed barangays
Proposed barangay	Yes		No		Valid votes		Actual voters		Registered voters
Proposed barangay	Total	%	Total	%	Total	%	Total	%	Registered voters
North	236	98.74%	3	1.26%	239	100%	239	10.44%	2,290
East	1,546	87.2%	227	12.8%	1,773	100%	1,773	66.58%	2,663
West	1,395	93.94%	90	6.06%	1,485	99.13%	1,498	61.07%	2,453
South	1,590	87.94%	218	12.06%	1,808	99.5%	1,817	64.82%	2,803
Total	4,767	89.86%	538	10.14%	5,305	99.59%	5,327	52.18%	10,209
Source: (1) (2) (3)

== Geography ==
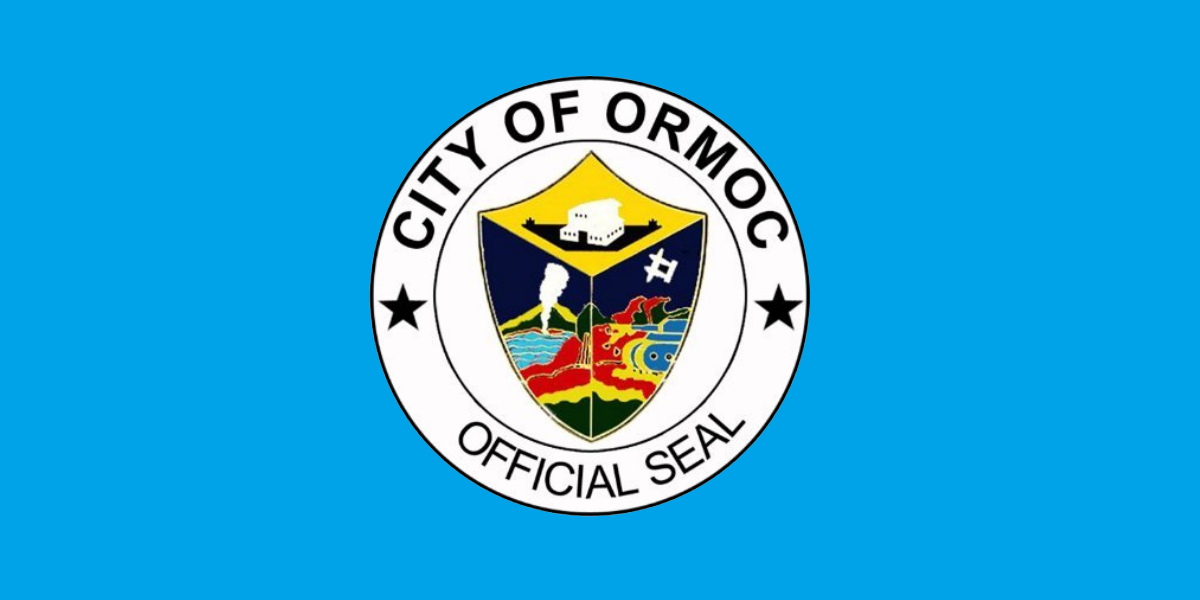
Former flag of Ormoc

Former seal of Ormoc

Ormoc City is a port city and is the largest city in Leyte by land area and the second-largest in Eastern Visayas after Calbayog in Samar. At the head of Ormoc Bay, the city's terrain is mostly of gently rolling plains. It is bounded on the northwest by the towns of Matag-ob and Merida, in the north by Kananga and Carigara, in the northeast by the towns of Jaro, Pastrana and Dagami, and in the south by the town of Albuera. High mountain ranges separate Ormoc from the eastern portion of Leyte. Numerous rivers and streams traverse Ormoc. Among them are the Bao River in the north, Pagsangahan River in the west, the Bagong-bong River in the south, the Panilahan River also in the south and the Anilao and Malbasag Rivers which border the eastern and western flanks of Ormoc City Proper.

=== Barangays ===
Ormoc is politically subdivided into 85 barangays. Each barangay consists of puroks and some have sitios.

The number had reduced from 110 upon ratification of an ordinance merging 29 of them to four.

- Airport
- Alegria
- Alta Vista
- Bagongbong
- Bagong Buhay
- Bantigue
- Batuan
- Bayog
- Biliboy
- Cabaon-an
- Cabintan
- Cabulihan
- Cagbuhangin
- Camp Downes
- Can-adieng
- Can-untog
- Catmon
- Cogon Combado
- Concepcion
- Curva
- Danhug (Lili-on)
- Dayhagan
- Dolores
- Domonar
- Don Carlos B. Rivilla Sr. (Boroc)
- Don Felipe Larrazabal
- Don Potenciano Larrazabal
- Doña Feliza Z. Mejia
- Donghol
- East (Poblacion; consisting former Brgys. District 9–11, 16, 18, 25 (Malbasag), 28)
- Esperanza
- Gaas
- Green Valley
- Guintigui-an
- Hibunawon
- Hugpa
- Ipil
- Juaton
- Kadaohan
- Labrador (Balion)
- Lake Danao
- Lao
- Leondoni
- Libertad
- Liberty
- Licuma
- Liloan
- Linao
- Luna
- Mabato
- Mabini
- Macabug
- Magaswi
- Mahayag
- Mahayahay
- Manlilinao
- Margen
- Mas-in
- Matica-a
- Milagro
- Monterico
- Nasunogan
- Naungan
- North (Poblacion; consisting former Brgy. District 29 (Nadongholan))
- Nueva Sociedad
- Nueva Vista
- Patag
- Punta
- Quezon, Jr.
- Rufina M. Tan (Rawis)
- Sabang Bao
- Salvacion
- San Antonio
- San Isidro
- San Jose
- San Juan
- San Pablo (Simangan)
- San Vicente
- Santo Niño
- South (Poblacion; consisting former Brgys. District 1–8, 12, 13, 15, 17, 23, 27)
- Sumangga
- Tambulilid
- Tongonan
- Valencia
- West (Poblacion; consisting former Brgys. District 14, 19–22, 24, 26 (Isla Verde))

=== Climate ===
Climate data for Ormoc City
Month	Jan	Feb	Mar	Apr	May	Jun	Jul	Aug	Sep	Oct	Nov	Dec	Year
Mean daily maximum °C (°F)	28 (82)	29 (84)	29 (84)	30 (86)	30 (86)	30 (86)	29 (84)	29 (84)	29 (84)	29 (84)	29 (84)	29 (84)	29 (84)
Mean daily minimum °C (°F)	22 (72)	22 (72)	22 (72)	23 (73)	25 (77)	25 (77)	25 (77)	25 (77)	25 (77)	24 (75)	24 (75)	23 (73)	24 (75)
Average precipitation mm (inches)	78 (3.1)	57 (2.2)	84 (3.3)	79 (3.1)	118 (4.6)	181 (7.1)	178 (7.0)	169 (6.7)	172 (6.8)	180 (7.1)	174 (6.9)	128 (5.0)	1,598 (62.9)
Average rainy days	16.7	13.8	17.3	18.5	23.2	26.5	27.1	26.0	26.4	27.5	24.6	21.0	268.6
Source: Meteoblue (modeled/calculated data, not measured locally)

== Demographics ==
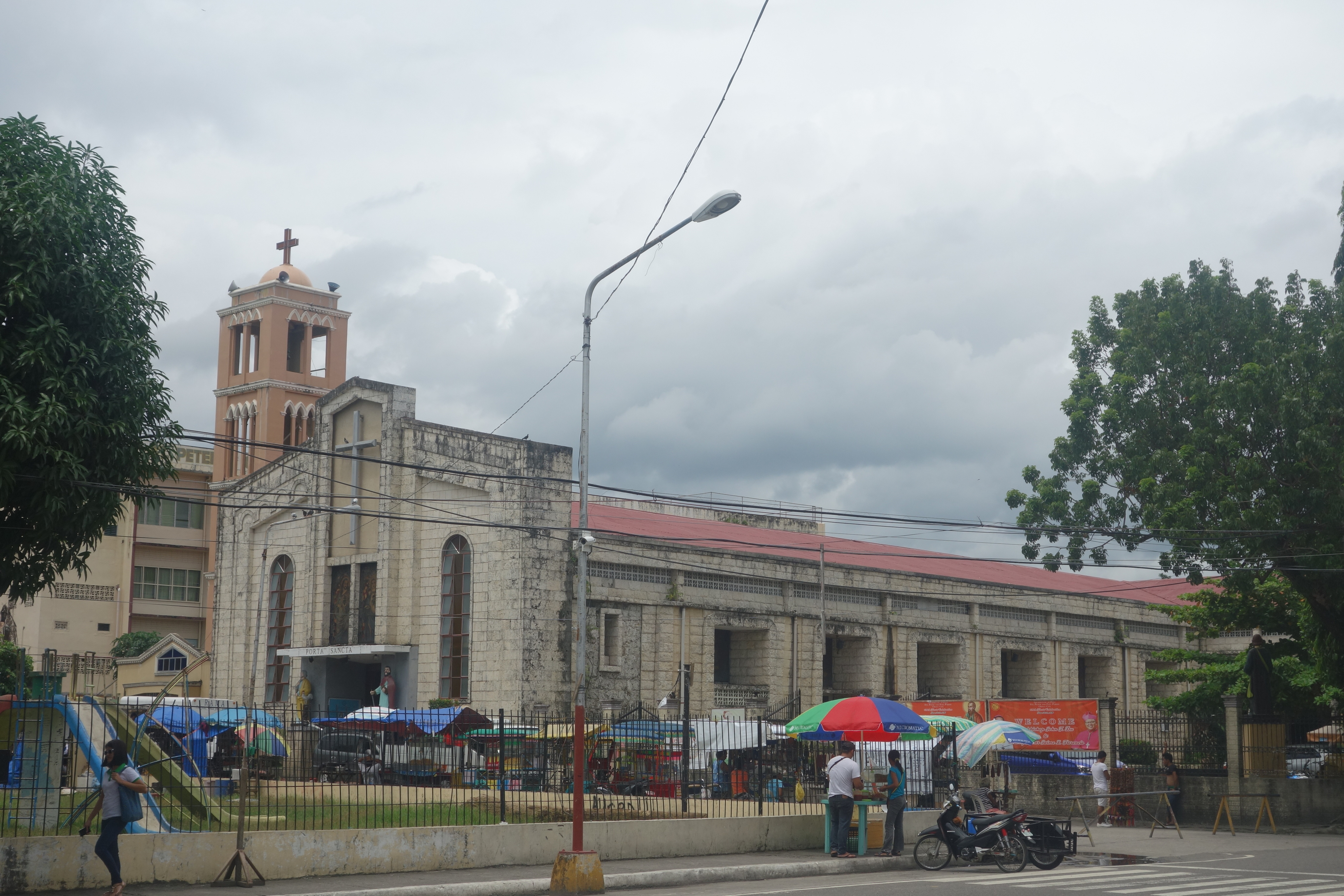
Saints Peter and Paul Parish Church

Population census of Ormoc

Year	Pop.	±% p.a.
1903	16,126	—
1918	38,174	+5.91%
1939	77,349	+3.42%
1948	72,733	−0.68%
1960	62,764	−1.22%
1970	84,563	+3.02%

Year	Pop.	±% p.a.
1975	89,466	+1.14%
1980	104,978	+3.25%
1990	129,456	+2.12%
1995	144,003	+2.02%
2000	154,297	+1.49%
2007	178,605	+2.04%

Year	Pop.	±% p.a.
2010	191,200	+2.51%
2015	215,031	+2.26%
2020	230,998	+1.52%
2024	238,545	+0.77%

Source: Philippine Statistics Authority

The natives of this city are called Ormocanons, with most being Cebuano speakers, as with the whole western and southern parts of the island of Leyte. A definite number of Waray speakers is also present within the city.

Like most Filipinos, Ormocanons are predominantly Roman Catholic, and the city celebrates its annual fiesta in honour of the patron saints Saint Peter and Saint Paul on June 28 and 29. Other main Catholic holy days, including the local fiestas of barangays, are observed throughout the year. There is also a visible Muslim minority within the city and all over the island, evidenced by the mosques within the cityscape and most of them are Maranaos from the twin provinces of Lanao del Norte and Lanao del Sur in Mindanao.

== Elected Officials ==
2025-2028 Ormoc City Officials
Position	Name	Party
Mayor	Lucy Marie T. Gomez	PFP
Vice Mayor	Leo Carmelo L. Locsin Jr.	PFP
Councilors	Ari G. Larrazabal	PFP
Councilors	Edmund B. Kierulf	PFP
Councilors	Tomas R. Serafica	PFP
Councilors	Jasper M. Lucero	PFP
Councilors	Peter M. Rodriguez	PFP
Councilors	Ma. Carmen Jean T. Rama	PFP
Councilors	Eusebio Gerardo S. Penserga	PFP
Councilors	Burt J. Pades	PFP
Councilors	Krizea Caessandra A. Mercadal	PFP
Councilors	Lalaine A. Marcos	PFP
Ex Officio City Council Members
ABC President	Esteban V. Laurente	Nonpartisan
SK Federation President	Jhana Lyka T. Calixtro	Nonpartisan

== Economy ==
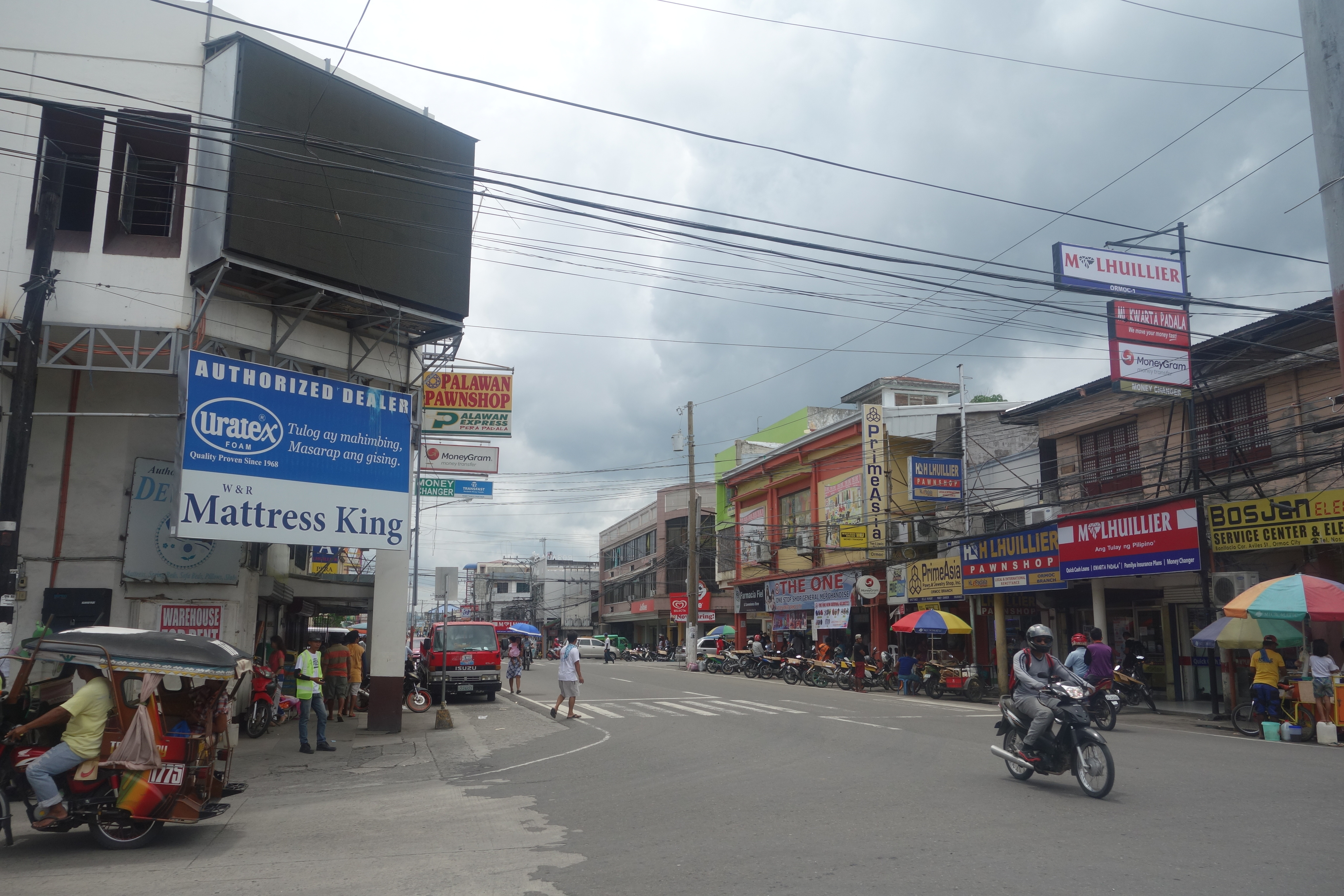
Aviles Street

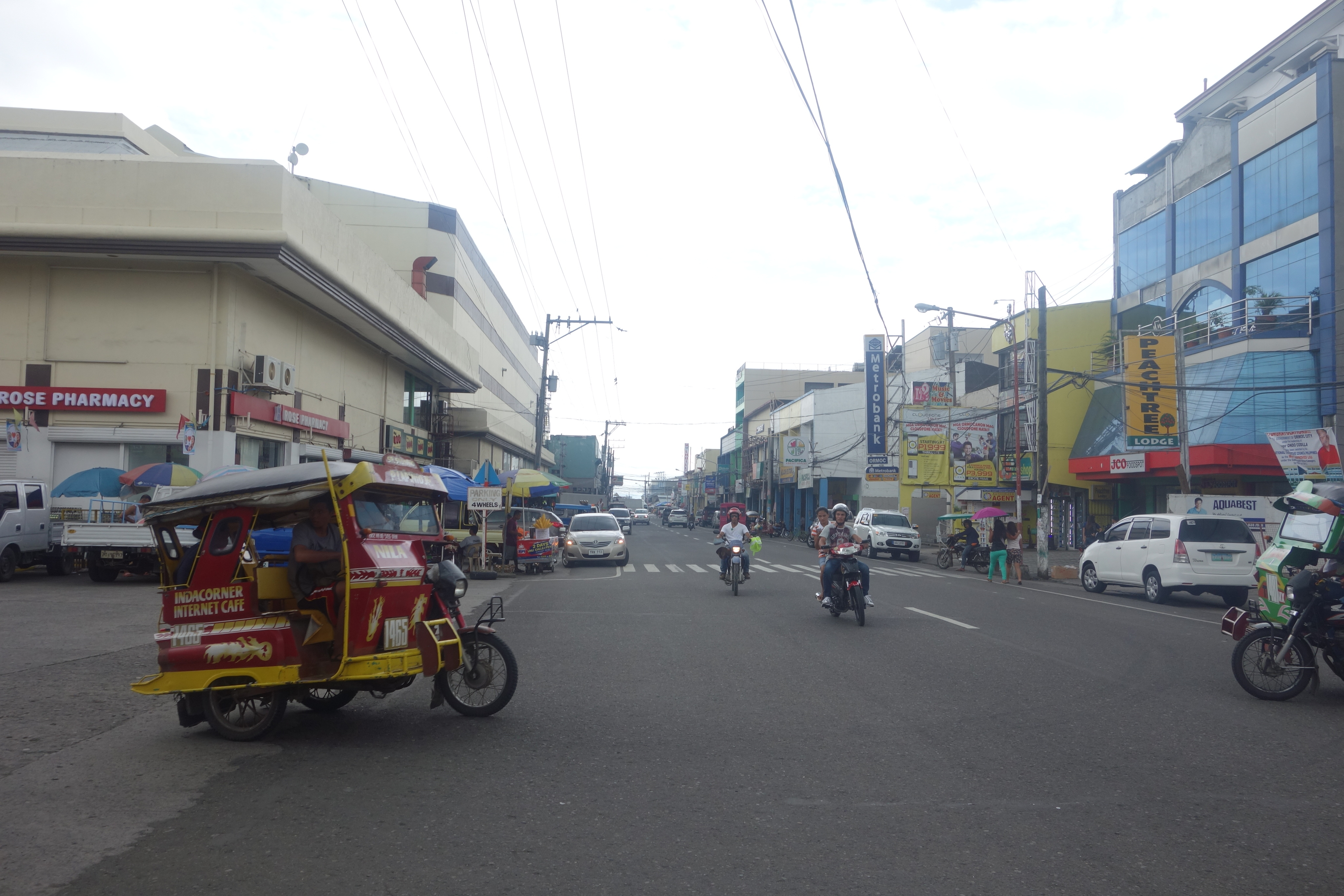
Real Street

Poverty incidence of Ormoc (%)

Source: Philippine Statistics Authority

Ormoc's economic base is a mix of agriculture, aquaculture, industry, tourism, and commercial services. Sugar cane, rice and pineapple are the major agricultural production.

The city enjoys economic growth because it supplies a large part of the country's power needs with its abundant geothermal power resources from the Tongonan Geothermal Power Plant in Barangay Tongonan and the neighbouring Kananga town. Ormoc is also the gateway to the Leyte Industrial Development Estate in the nearby town of Isabel, home of the Philippine Phosphate Fertilizer Plant, the largest fertilizer factory in Asia, and the Philippine Associated Smelter and Refining Company, the country's biggest copper processing plant, among other industries.

== Tourism ==
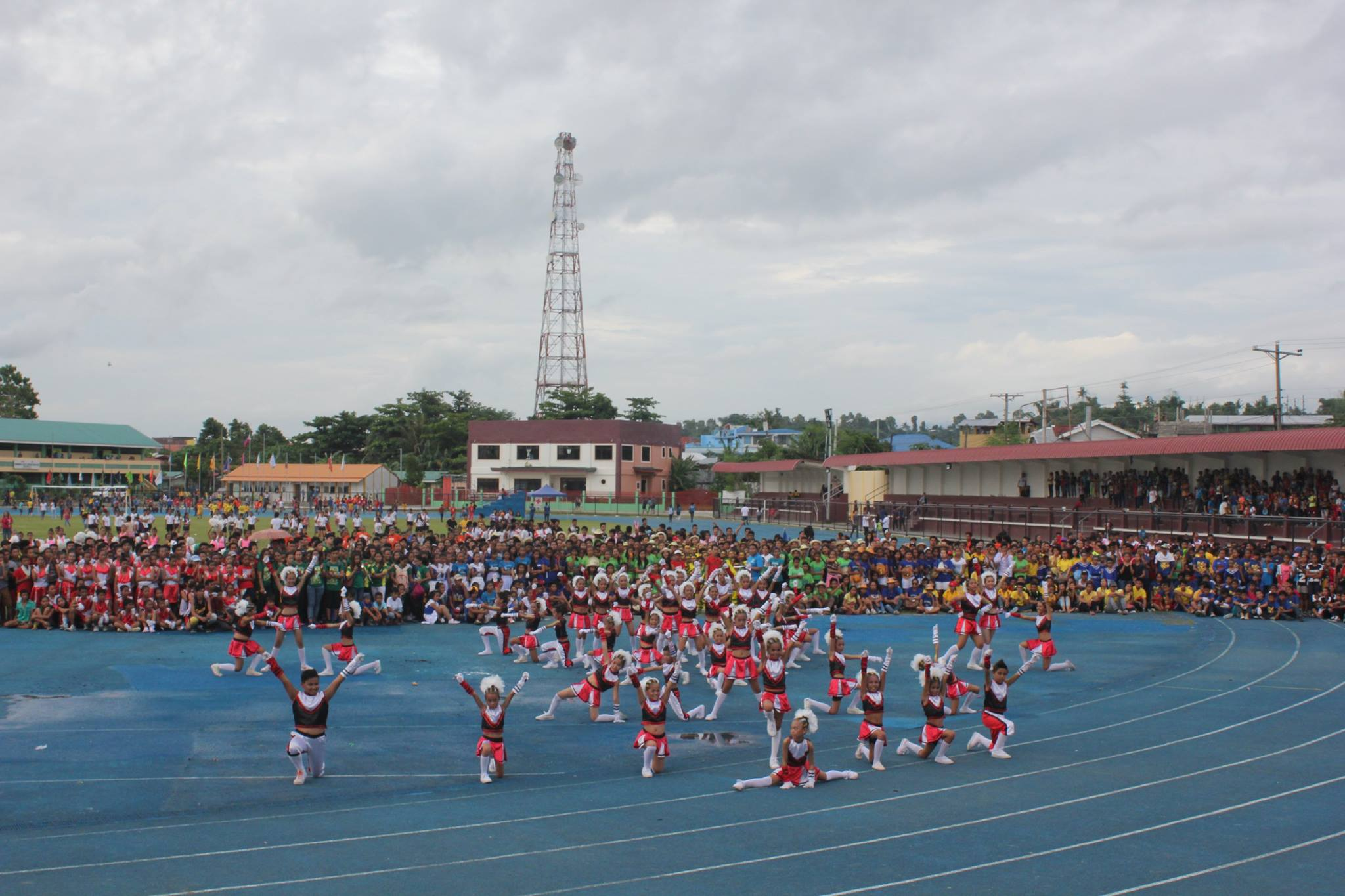
Ormoc City Sports Complex

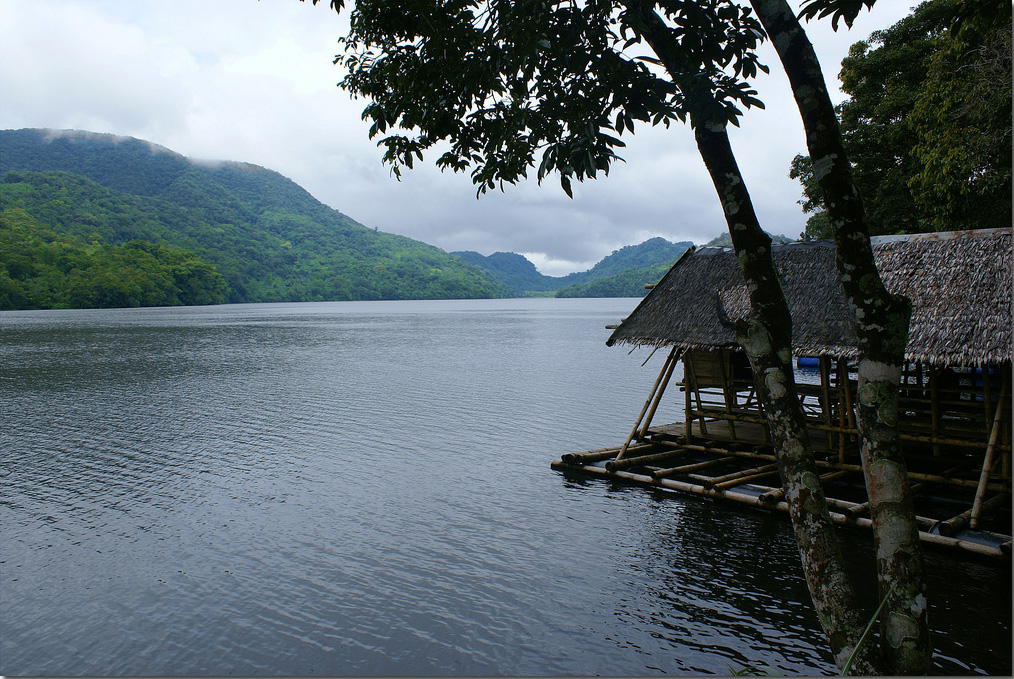
Lake Danao

Among sites visited by the city's tourist are:

- Lake Danao is a violin shaped lake 3 km long at an elevation of 2,100 feet (640 m) above sea level. There are floating cottages, and boats are available for hire and a future zipline. Lake Danao was formerly called as Lake Imelda. On February 3, 1998, it was renamed and declared as Lake Danao National Park and is protected by the National Integrated Protected Area System Act of 1992.
- Tongonan Hotsprings National Park is located at an elevation of 2,000 ft. amid densely forested hills. It is a 272-hectare park at the west end of the Leyte Mountain Trail, 18 km. northeast of Ormoc City. It also has a cool climate, lush tropical vegetation and underbrush, a warm medicinal pool, a cavernous hillside geyser that spouts boiling water and steam hourly and formations exuding sulfuric vapors. It is a valley of geothermal power source that can supply electricity to the whole region. The first geothermal plant to operate in the Philippines.
- Pineapple Plantation lies in 210 hectares in rolling terrain located north of the city Barangay Hibunawon. Ormoc's Queen Pineapple is famous for its sweetness, a favourite pasalubong, and the unofficial icon of the city. The plantation is owned by the Locsins (family of the city vice mayor). Ormoc is known for its famous “Queen Pineapple."
- Centennial Park The Veteran's Park was constructed in early 1990s in honor of the Filipino soldiers who fought for the liberation of Leyte and the Philippines. The Centennial Marker was erected in 1998 to commemorate the 100th year of Philippine independence. The park is located in the city, it is a leisure and picnic ground for the young and old alike.
- Lake Kasudsuran is just one of the three beautiful lakes of Ormoc. It is located at Barangay Gaas, Ormoc City in Leyte. The 5-hectare Lake Kasudsuran is located 27 km (a 45-hr. drive) northeast of Ormoc City on the virgin forest of Barangay Ga-as and Mt. Janagdan, a plateau 1,000 m above sea level. The lake is only accessible by foot. Lake Kasudsuran is also a place to explore in Ormoc City.
- Alto Peak is known as the highest mountain in Eastern Visayas(Region VIII). The domain is also a home to farming communities that has vegetable plantations, etc. It is also known as Mt. Amindueuen and is technically part of the Municipality of Jaro, Leyte but its jump off is in Barangay Cabintan, Ormoc City.
- Sayahan Falls The Sayahan Falls is a newly discovered spot that is located at Sitio Maglahug, Barangay Gaas, Ormoc City. The Sayahan Falls started gaining attention when a local tourist uploaded pictures of it in social media and was widely shared.
- Puente dela Reina is known as the oldest bridge in the city. Its cobblestones still intact, relic of an age long gone. It was built in the early 1800s but was completed in 1861. In Spanish era, the bridge was used as docking area for sailboats, vintas of Chinese, Javans and Indonesians who frequented the island to sell their produce. The bridge is still in use to this day.
- Western Leyte Guerrilla Warfare Forces Monument The Monument commemorates the Filipino resistance fighters who fought in the guerilla war against the Japanese occupiers in the Second World War
- Ruins of Cong. Dominador Tan Residence The Tan Mansion Ruins was built during the 1930s. In World War II, the mansion became a Japanese garrison in Leyte. It was destroyed during the bombing of Ormoc before liberation day, known as the “Battle of Ormoc Bay.” The Tan Mansion Ruins is like a memorial to the Japanese that visits the place. Treated like a shrine as it has a significant part of history of both countries—Japan and Philippines. It serves as a monument representing not only Dominador's young love but also as witness to Ormoc's history.
- Ormoc ecopark and township. Fishermen and environmentalists of Barangay Naungan protested Premium Lands Corporation's P80-million Naungan ecopark and mega city-township project. Jean Justimbaste, Pagtinabangay Foundation coordinator, said the township had negative impact on Ormocanons' food security, livelihood, and local biodiversity.

== Infrastructure ==
=== Transport ===
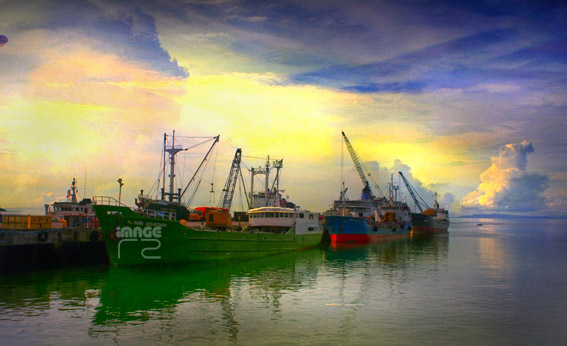
Port of Ormoc

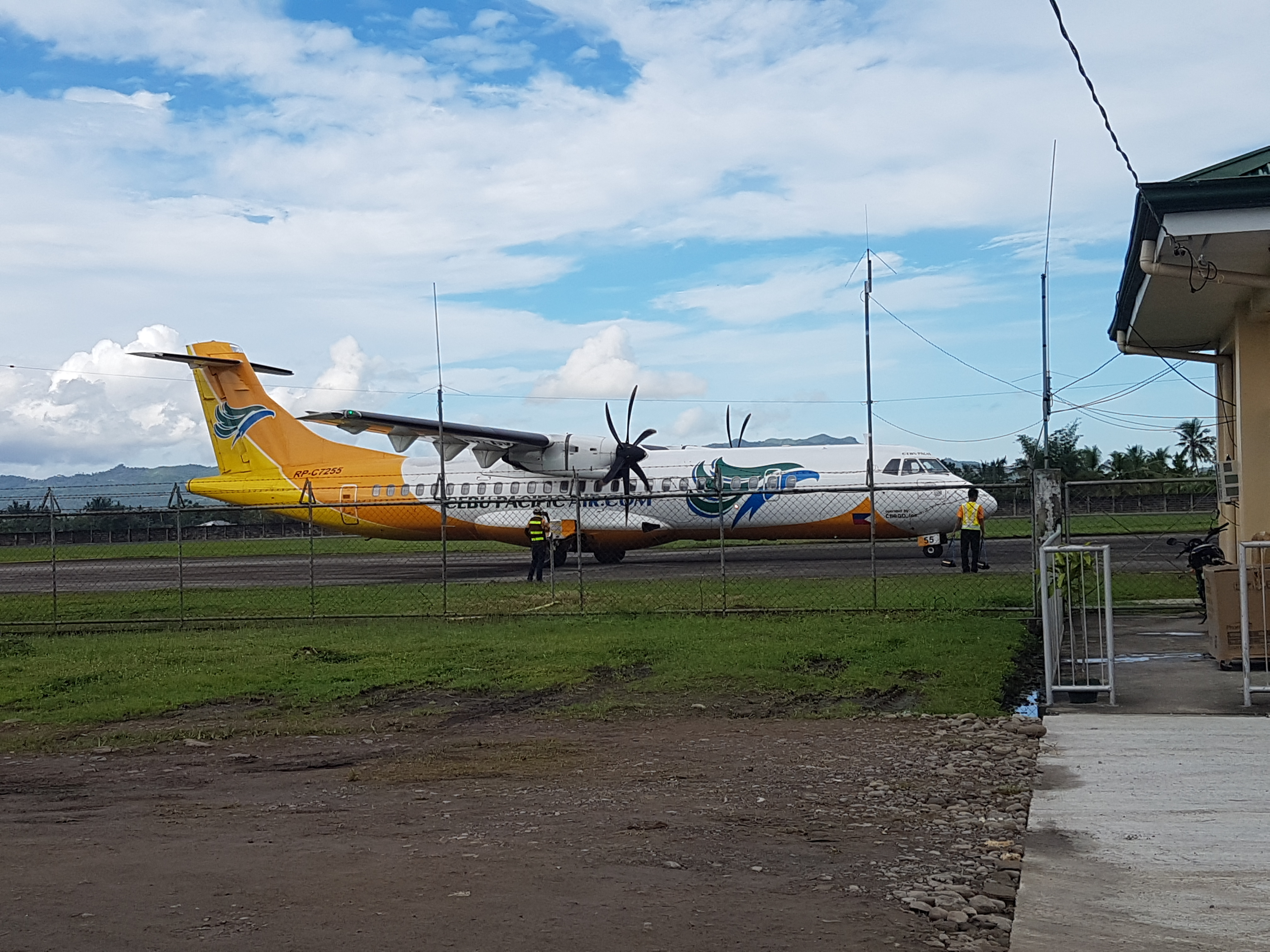
Ormoc Airport

The Port of Ormoc serves as the seaport of the city. For air transport, Ormoc Airport serves the city, although no regular commercial flights fly to this airport. Daniel Z. Romualdez Airport in Tacloban is the closest airport with commercial flights.

=== Energy ===
Ormoc hosts the biggest power plant in Southeast Asia - the Tongonan Geothermal Power in Barangay Tongonan which supplies electricity not only in the Eastern Visayas Region but power demand in Luzon and Mindanao as well.

== Education ==
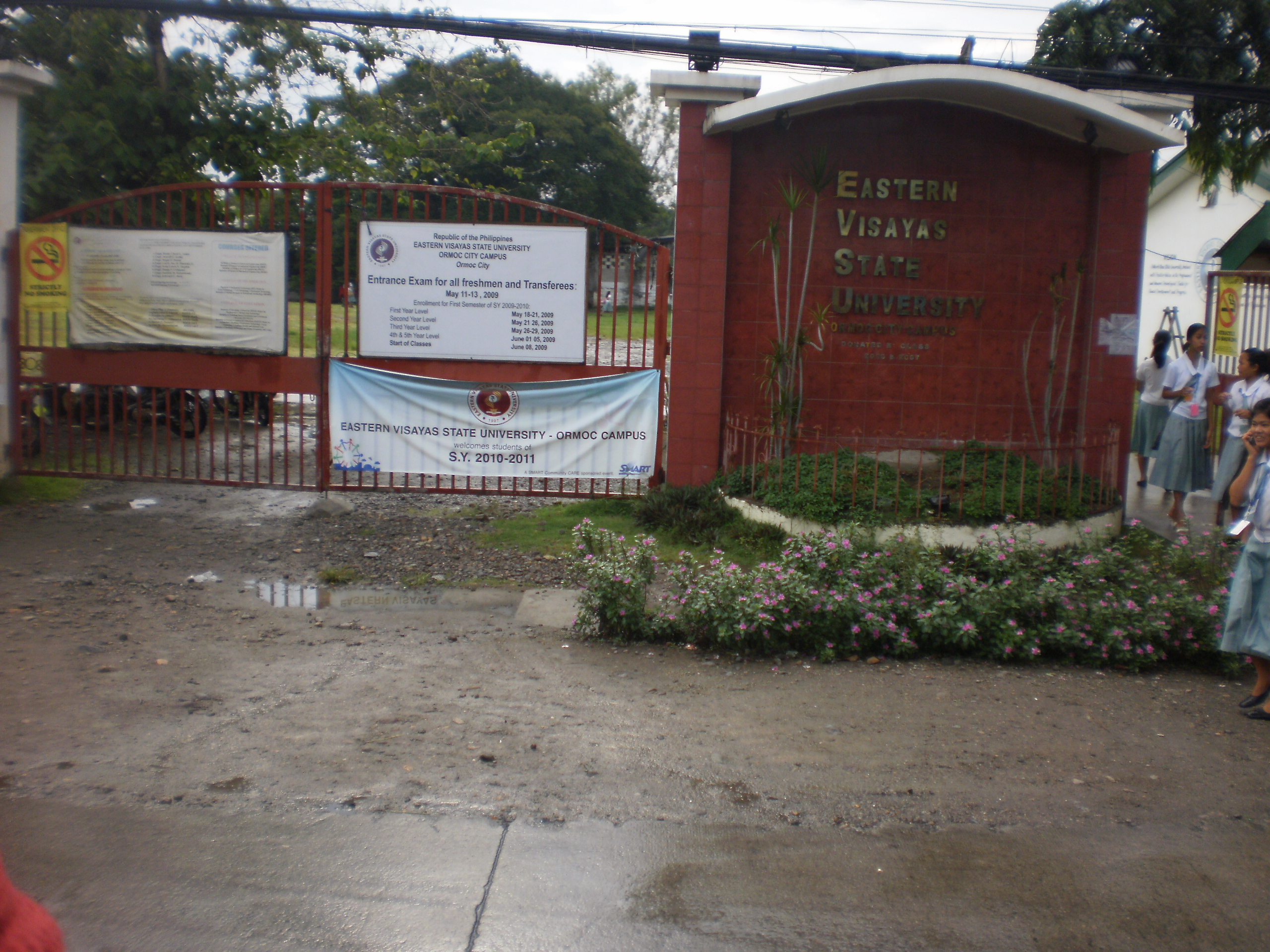
Eastern Visayas State University - Ormoc Campus

Ormoc is the educational center for western Leyte. It has a range of primary and secondary schools, both public and private. Tertiary education was originally offered by Saint Peter's College of Ormoc, a Benedictine-run Catholic college and the oldest, followed by Western Leyte College of Ormoc City, Inc., a private non-sectarian college. In the 1980s-1990s, the city saw the establishment of Santo Niño College of Ormoc, Saint Paul's School of Ormoc Foundation, Inc. and the STI College - Ormoc. In the 2000s, tertiary institutions founded were ACLC College of Ormoc, San Lorenzo Ruiz College of Ormoc, Ormoc City Institute of Technology (OCIT) and the Ormoc campus of the Eastern Visayas State University.

Ormoc also has their own Chinese school which is Ormoc Se San School.

== Notable personalities ==
- Johnriel Casimero - professional boxer
- Monica Cuenco - singer, theater actress
- Rey Evangelista - former professional basketball player
- Richard Gomez - actor, Former Ormoc City mayor, current Congressman of 4th District, Leyte
- Chico Lanete and Garvo Lanete - professional basketball players
- Zenaida Monsada - chemist, Department of Energy Officer-in-Charge Secretary
- Lucy Torres-Gomez - actress, Former Congresswoman of 4th District, Leyte, Ormoc City mayor
- Robert Bolick - Professional basketball player
