= Kananga, Leyte =

Municipality in Leyte, Philippines

Kananga
- Municipality
- Municipality of Kananga
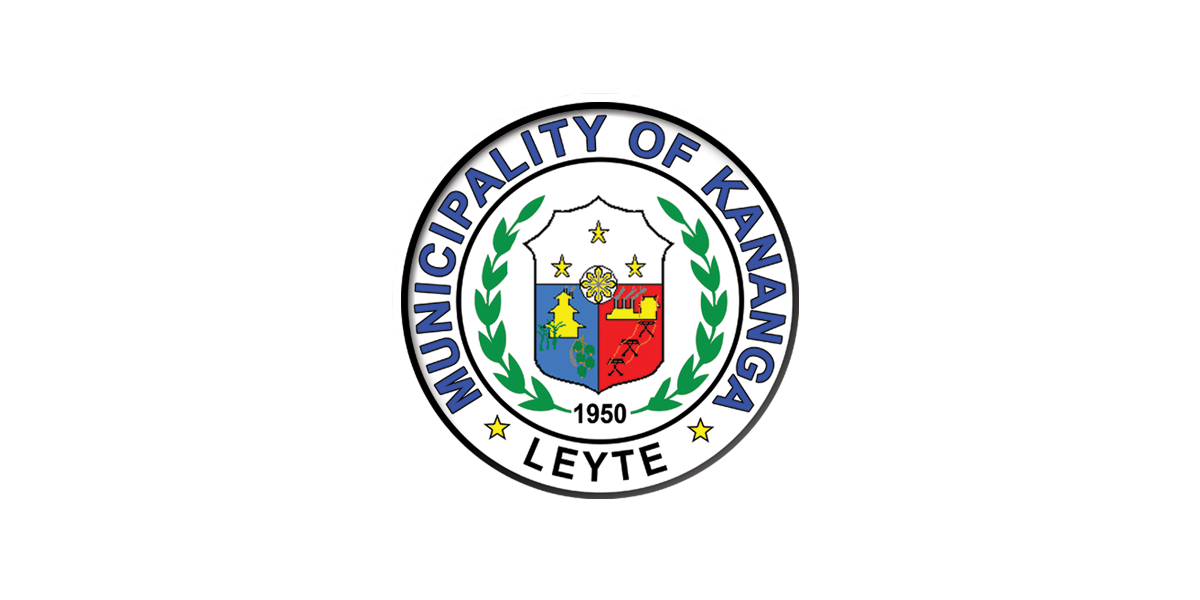
- Flag

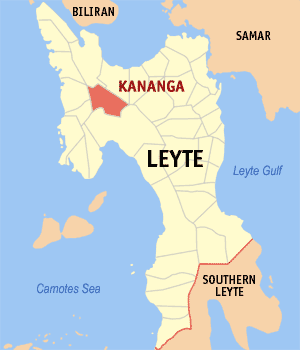
- Map of Leyte with Kananga highlighted
- Interactive map of Kananga
- Location within the Philippines
- Coordinates: 11°11′08″N 124°33′35″E
- Country: Philippines
- Region: Eastern Visayas
- Province: Leyte
- District: 4th district
- Founded: June 17, 1950
- Barangays: 23 (see Barangays)

Government
  - Type: Sangguniang Bayan
  - Mayor: Manuel Vicente M. Torres
  - Vice Mayor: Miguel Jorge P. Tan
  - Representative: Richard I. Gomez (PDPLBN)
  - Councilors: List: • Brenzon C. Cabintoy; • Richie C. Cruz; • Fernando M. Aseo; • Minerva M. Bulawit; • Allan C. Espinosa; • Rudy B. Cogay; • Alma N. Orfano; • Resurreccion C. Capanas; DILG Masterlist of Officials
  - Electorate: 40,805 voters (2025)

Area
  - Total: 144.20 km^{2} (55.68 sq mi)
- Elevation: 209 m (686 ft)
- Highest elevation: 1,231 m (4,039 ft)
- Lowest elevation: 12 m (39 ft)

Population (2024 census)
  - Total: 60,885
  - Density: 422.23/km^{2} (1,093.6/sq mi)
  - Households: 14,121

Economy
  - Income class: 1st municipal income class
  - Poverty incidence: 34.62% (2023)
  - Revenue: ₱ 382.7 million (2024)
  - Assets: ₱ 2,813 million (2024)
  - Expenditure: ₱ 312.5 million (2024)
  - Liabilities: ₱ 1,669 million (2024)

Service provider
  - Electricity: Leyte 5 Electric Cooperative (LEYECO 5)
- Time zone: UTC+8 (PST)
- ZIP code: 6531
- PSGC: 0803726000
- IDD : area code: +63 (0)53
- Native languages: Cebuano Waray Tagalog
- Website: www.kananga-leyte.gov.ph

Kananga (IPA: [kɐ'naŋga]), officially the Municipality of Kananga (Cebuano: Lungsod sa Kananga; Waray: Bungto han Kananga, Tagalog: Bayan ng Kananga), is a First Income Class municipality in the province of Leyte, Philippines. According to the 2024 census, it has a population of 60,885 people.

Majority of Kananga's economic activity has historically been concentrated in agriculture. Some are engaged in commerce and trade. The town is geographically close to the city of Ormoc and coastal town of Palompon. The town's main crops are coconut (niyog) and rice (palay).

Kananga, sometimes known as Asia's geothermal capital, is the richest municipality in Eastern Visayas.

== History ==
Kananga was established on June 17, 1950 from the barrios of Lonoy, Kananga, Rizal, Tugbong, Montebello, Aguiting, Agayayan, Montealegre, Libungao, Naghalin, and Masarayao which all used to be part of Ormoc, by virtue of Republic Act No. 542.

The town faced a major headline in November 2024 when its mayor, Manuel Torres, became the only mayor to support House Bill no. 11077 splitting of the western part of Leyte into a new province aptly named "Western Leyte".

== Geography ==
=== Barangays ===
Kananga is politically subdivided into 23 barangays. Each barangay consists of puroks and some have sitios.

- Aguiting
- Cacao
- Kawayan
- Hiluctogan
- Libertad
- Libongao
- Lim-ao
- Lonoy
- Mahawan
- Masarayao
- Monte Alegre
- Monte Bello (including Kananga Special Economic Zone)
- Naghalin
- Natubgan
- Poblacion
- Rizal
- San Ignacio
- San Isidro
- Santo Domingo
- Santo Niño
- Tagaytay
- Tongonan
- Tugbong

=== Climate ===
Climate data for Kananga, Leyte
Month	Jan	Feb	Mar	Apr	May	Jun	Jul	Aug	Sep	Oct	Nov	Dec	Year
Mean daily maximum °C (°F)	28 (82)	29 (84)	29 (84)	30 (86)	31 (88)	30 (86)	29 (84)	29 (84)	29 (84)	29 (84)	29 (84)	28 (82)	29 (84)
Mean daily minimum °C (°F)	22 (72)	22 (72)	22 (72)	23 (73)	24 (75)	25 (77)	24 (75)	25 (77)	24 (75)	24 (75)	24 (75)	23 (73)	24 (74)
Average precipitation mm (inches)	73 (2.9)	56 (2.2)	75 (3.0)	71 (2.8)	114 (4.5)	174 (6.9)	172 (6.8)	163 (6.4)	167 (6.6)	161 (6.3)	158 (6.2)	125 (4.9)	1,509 (59.5)
Average rainy days	15.2	12.5	16.2	17.3	23.9	27.3	28.4	26.9	26.9	27.1	23.8	19.3	264.8
Source: Meteoblue (modeled/calculated data, not measured locally)

== Demographics ==
Population census of Kananga

Year	Pop.	±% p.a.
1960	18,318	—
1970	22,218	+1.95%
1975	24,897	+2.31%
1980	28,426	+2.69%
1990	36,288	+2.47%
1995	39,795	+1.74%

Year	Pop.	±% p.a.
2000	42,866	+1.61%
2007	46,373	+1.09%
2010	48,027	+1.28%
2015	56,575	+3.17%
2020	59,696	+1.14%
2024	60,885	+0.47%

Source: Philippine Statistics Authority

In the 2024 census, the population of Kananga was 60,885 people, with a density of 420 inhabitants per square kilometre or 1,100 inhabitants per square mile.

=== Language ===
The municipality speaks both Cebuano and Waray, making it a bilingual municipality. The influx of Cebuano speaking settlers from Ormoc and other adjacent municipalities during the olden times is the reason why the Cebuano language flourished in the area.

== Economy ==
Poverty incidence of Kananga (%)

Source: Philippine Statistics Authority

== Government ==
2025-2028 Kananga, Leyte Officials
Position	Name	Party	Start of term	End of term	Term
Mayor	Manuel Vicente M. Torres	PFP	June 30, 2019	June 30, 2028	3
Vice Mayor	Miguel Jorge P. Tan	PFP	June 30, 2019	June 30, 2028	3
Councilors	Fernando M. Aseo	PFP	June 30, 2019	June 30, 2028	3
Councilors	Minerva M. Bulawit	PFP	June 30, 2019	June 30, 2028	3
Councilors	Richie C. Cruz	PFP	June 30, 2019	June 30, 2028	3
Councilors	Alma N. Orfano	PFP	June 30, 2019	June 30, 2028	3
Councilors	Brenzon C. Cabintoy	PFP	June 30, 2019	June 30, 2028	3
Councilors	Allan C. Espinosa	PFP	June 30, 2022	June 30, 2028	2
Councilors	Rudy B. Cogay	PFP	June 30, 2019	June 30, 2028	3
Councilors	Ronelio C. Palar	PFP	June 30, 2025	June 30, 2028	1
Ex Officio Municipal Council Members
ABC President	TBD	Nonpartisan		January 1, 2027	1
SK Federation President	TBD	Nonpartisan		January 1, 2027	1

== Infrastructure ==
Kananga is a bustling town, located along the highway, in close proximity to Ormoc City in the south. Energy Development Corporation's Tongonan Geothermal Powerplant, one of the largest geothermal powerplants in the Philippines, is located in Kananga.

Several bus companies including Philtranco and DLTBCo operate a bus depot in Manila and in Ormoc City, a few miles from Kananga. There are also jeepneys, van and buses from and to Ormoc City and Tacloban City.

Kananga and neighboring towns and cities in Leyte are served by two commercial airports namely Daniel Z. Romualdez Airport located in Tacloban City, about 52 miles east of the town and local Ormoc Airport in neighboring Ormoc City, which has a connecting Cebu Pacific commercial flights to and from Cebu via Mactan–Cebu International Airport. Kananga can also be reached by sea through Ormoc City's major port where passenger ships and ferries such as Supercat Fast Ferry and OceanJet dock to and from Cebu City and Manila.

Kananga has remained relatively free of commercial developments that are common in other towns of similar size in the country.

== Culture ==
The local government celebrates the Kananga Kaanyag Festival which aims to commemorate the town's rich culture and traditions.

== Education ==
Kananga is home to two different secondary schools, Kananga National High School (KNHS) and National Heroes Institute (NHI) as well as Kananga National High School- Kawayan Annex (Grade 7–10 in newly introduced K-12 program education in the Philippines situated on top of the picturesque view of the mountain in Sitio Estrada, where can easily walk through a newly cemented road by about a mile away from the main highway of Barangay Kawayan, which caters neighboring poor students from inland villages of San Isidro and Monteaglegre; and Kananga National High School - Libertad Annex, located in Barangay Libertad, which also caters neighboring students from inland villages. Another public high schools were open in Barangays Rizal and Montebello Annex- the land of Hideco Sugar milling company; the most competitive school among all annexes serving the locale of Barangay montebello, Aguiting, naghalin, masarayao, san ignacio, etc. They are very competitive in terms on sports and contests.
