= Ormoc Airport =

Airport serving Ormoc, Leyte, Philippines

Ormoc Airport Tugpahanan sa Ormoc Luparan han Ormoc Paliparan ng Ormoc
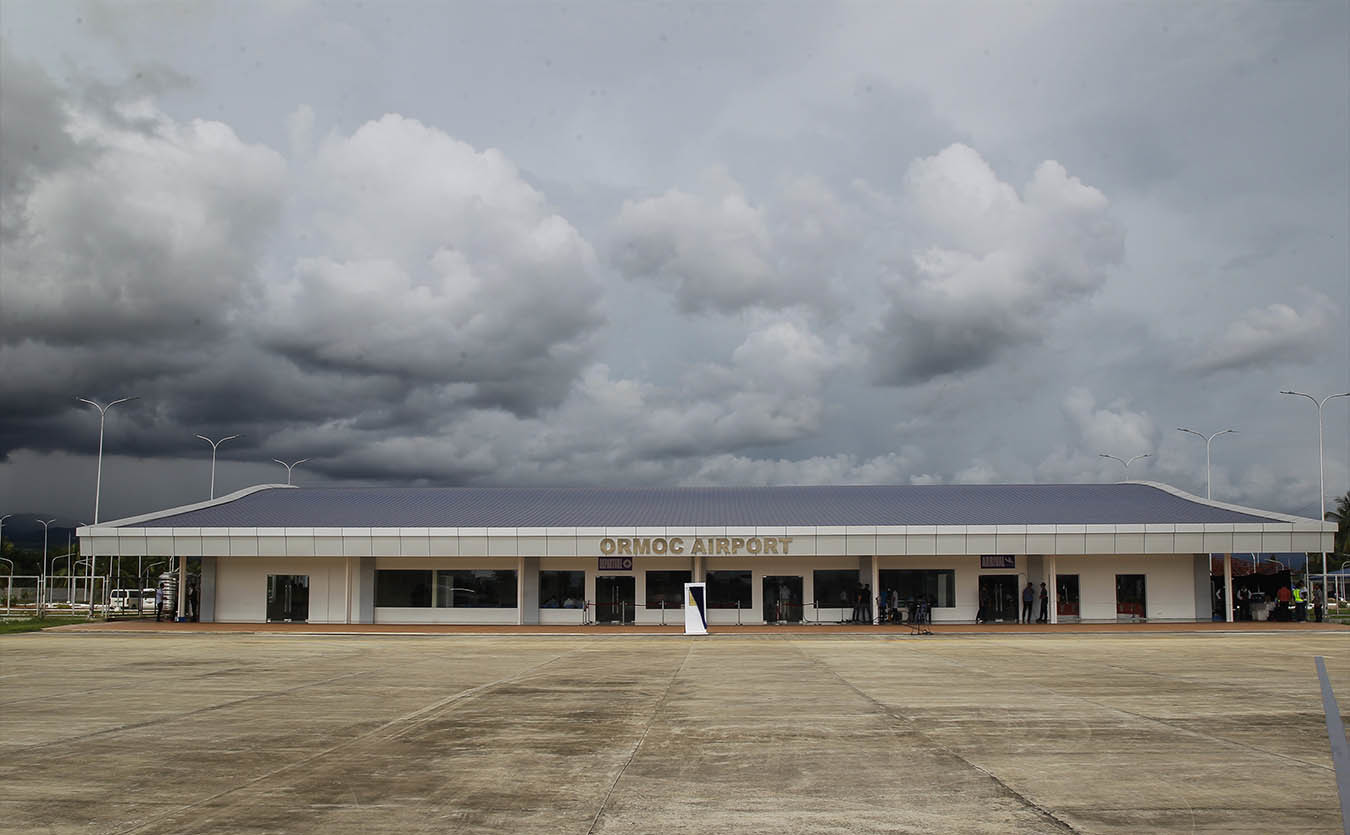
- Exterior of Ormoc Airport in 2019 after its renovation.
- IATA: OMC; ICAO: RPVO

Summary
- Airport type: Public
- Operator: Civil Aviation Authority of the Philippines
- Serves: Ormoc
- Elevation AMSL: 25 m / 83 ft
- Coordinates: 11°3′22.34″N 124°33′56.5″E

Map

Runways
Direction	Length		Surface
Direction	m	ft	Surface
18/36	2,100	6,890	Asphalt

Statistics (2009)
- Passengers: 17,800
- Aircraft movements: 400
- Tonnes of cargo: 145.9
- Statistics from the Civil Aviation Authority of the Philippines.

Ormoc Airport (IATA: OMC, ICAO: RPVO) is an airport serving the general area of Ormoc, located in the province of Leyte in the Philippines. It is one of three airports in the province of Leyte, the others being Daniel Z. Romualdez Airport in Tacloban and Hilongos Airport. Likewise, Ormoc Airport is one of the few airports in the Philippines to be situated in an "airport village", a barangay specifically designated for the airport and its surrounding area.

The airport is classified as a Class 2 principal (minor domestic) airport by the Civil Aviation Authority of the Philippines, a body of the Department of Transportation that is responsible for the operations of not only this airport but also of all other airports in the Philippines except the major international airports.

The airport code OMC was assigned to Ormoc Airport by the United States Department of Transportation during the colonial period. Since airport codes can be reused, DOT also assigned the airport the ID #14558, which identifies a unique airport, and the sequence ID #1455802 which identifies a unique airport at a given point in time.

== History and expansion ==
Ormoc Airport had been previously served by several airlines. The airport had suffered damage following several natural calamities, including Typhoon Yolanda (Haiyan) in 2013 and the magnitude 6.5 earthquake in July 2017. In February 2018, the P34-million rehabilitation project begun carried out by DOTr and the Department of Public Works and Highways (DPWH) was completed last May 31.

It includes the expansion of the airport's total area from 150 square meters to 1,350 sqm, the renovation of the passenger terminal building, and the construction of the Civil Aviation Authority of the Philippines (CAAP) administration building. The airport's runway is being improved to accommodate larger aircraft.

The new passenger terminal building was inaugurated on May 9, 2019, led by DOTr Secretary Arthur Tugade and Mayor Richard Gomez of Ormoc City.

== Gallery ==
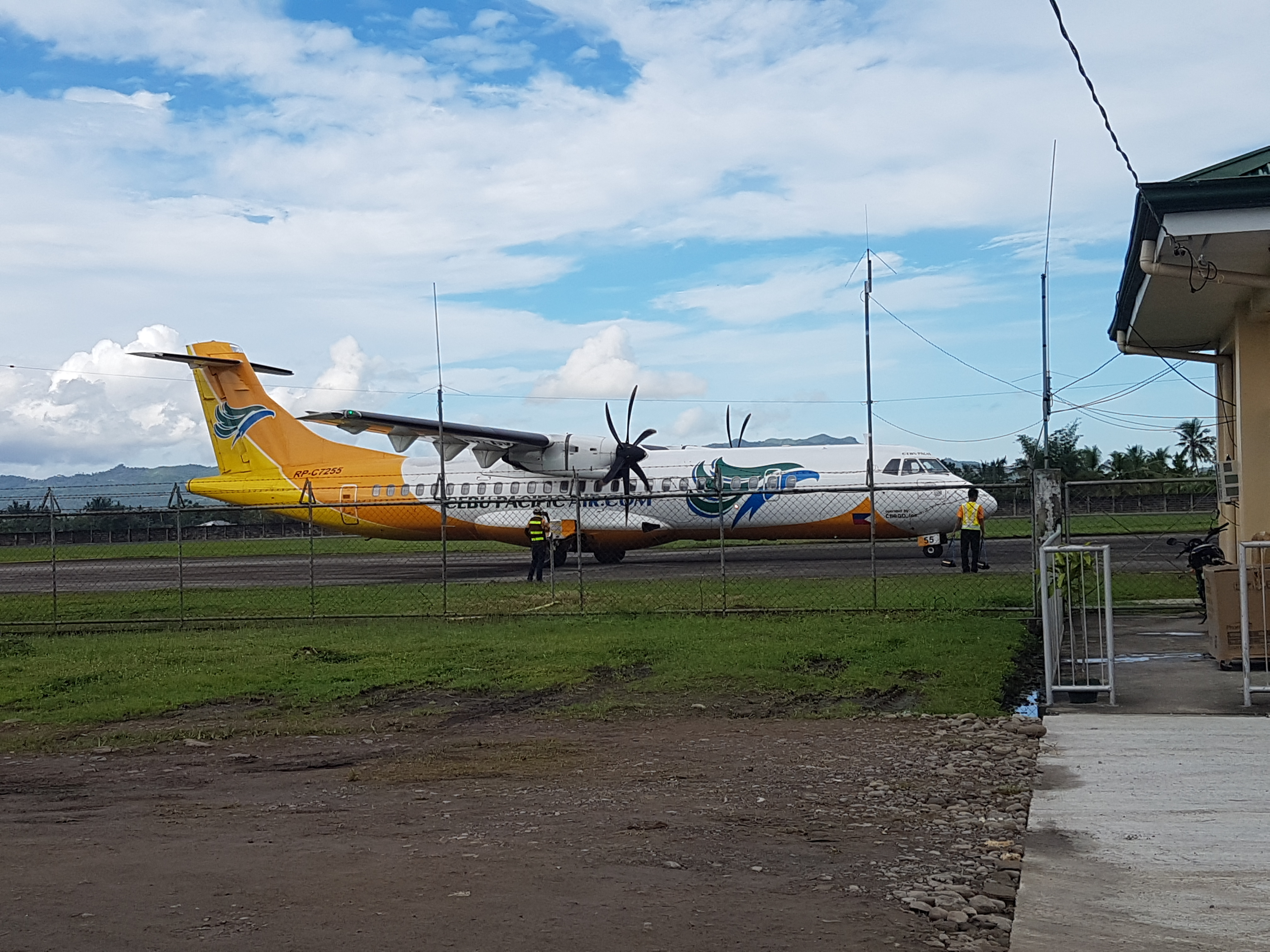
A Cebgo ATR 72 in Ormoc Airport.

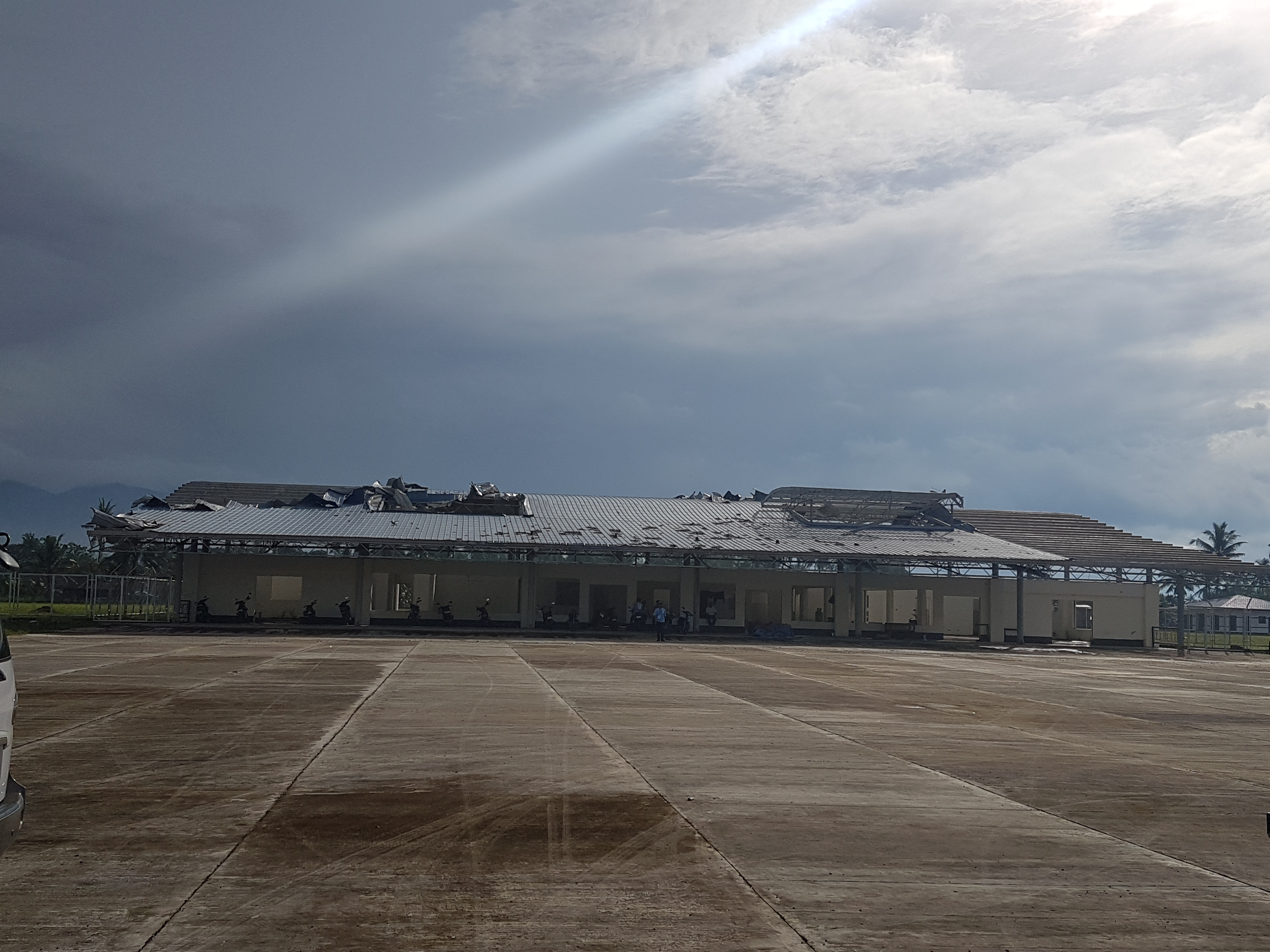
New Ormoc Airport Terminal undergoing construction

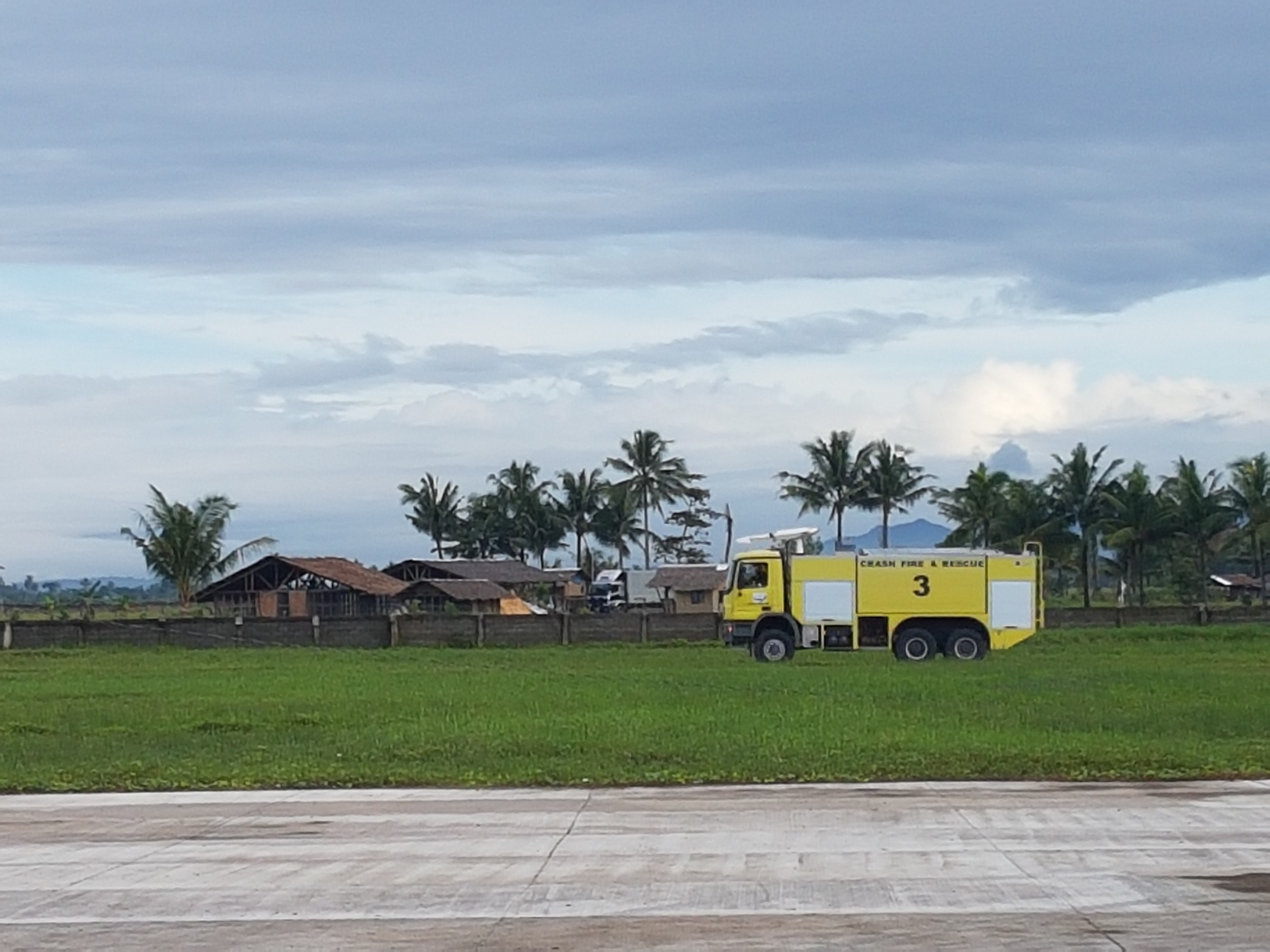
Crash fire & Rescue Truck of Ormoc Airport

== See also ==
- List of airports in the Philippines
