= Battle of Montebello =

Battle of Montebello can refer to two battles, fought near Montebello, Province of Pavia, in Northern Italy:

- Battle of Montebello (1800), in which the French defeated an Austrian army (9 June 1800).
- Battle of Montebello (1859), in which a combined Sardinian-French army defeated an Austrian army, during the Austro-Sardinian War (20 May 1859).
