= List of homesteads in Western Australia: M =

This list includes all homesteads in Western Australia with a gazetted name. It is complete with respect to the 1996 Gazetteer of Australia. Dubious names have been checked against the online 2004 data, and in all cases confirmed correct. However, if any homesteads have been gazetted or deleted since 1996, this list does not reflect these changes. Strictly speaking, Australian place names are gazetted in capital letters only; the names in this list have been converted to mixed case in accordance with normal capitalisation conventions.

Name	Location	Remarks
Mabel Downs	17°11′S 128°7′E	
Macsfield	33°37′S 122°37′E	
Macsville	33°2′S 119°44′E	
Madderbine Spring	32°32′S 116°58′E	
Maddington	31°58′S 116°43′E	
Madigan	19°31′S 126°47′E	
Madison Fields	30°15′S 116°34′E	
Madjidin	33°3′S 116°53′E	
Madman Outcamp	25°49′S 121°4′E	
Madoonga	26°56′S 117°36′E	
Madoonia Downs	31°25′S 122°21′E	
Madura	31°56′S 126°58′E	
Magdhaba Downs	33°18′S 119°40′E	
Magpie Hill	34°29′S 117°36′E	
Mahlyndrew Farms	31°19′S 115°49′E	
Maiden Flat Farm	31°54′S 116°58′E	
Maidestone	33°42′S 117°9′E	
Maidment Gardens	33°33′S 115°34′E	
Maikurra	33°47′S 122°28′E	
Mail Box Hill	33°54′S 118°46′E	
Mailling	33°17′S 117°6′E	
Mairim	32°3′S 118°14′E	
Mairunging	32°24′S 117°4′E	
Maitland Downs	31°4′S 115°57′E	
Majekine	31°59′S 117°0′E	
Major Farm	33°13′S 116°59′E	
Malarang Park	28°40′S 114°54′E	
Maleleuca	33°32′S 118°3′E	
Malgrae	32°31′S 117°30′E	
Malkana	33°48′S 120°25′E	
Malkana	34°6′S 118°37′E	
Malkana	33°33′S 119°55′E	
Malkarna	29°25′S 115°26′E	
Malkup	31°33′S 116°21′E	
Malkup Brook	31°31′S 116°21′E	
Malladup	33°57′S 117°48′E	
Mallee Downs	33°3′S 121°49′E	
Malleea Farm	33°45′S 115°12′E	
Mallina	20°53′S 118°2′E	
Malsu	32°56′S 116°33′E	
Malvern Hills	33°42′S 117°24′E	
Mambra	32°48′S 117°11′E	
Mamre	29°42′S 115°26′E	
Manaring	33°3′S 117°5′E	
Manasah	33°47′S 121°48′E	
Manberry	24°1′S 114°9′E	
Mandalay	34°32′S 117°17′E	
Mandalup	33°52′S 117°7′E	
Mandetta	34°21′S 119°17′E	
Mandiakon	32°14′S 116°49′E	
Mandilla	31°23′S 121°32′E	
Mandina	30°45′S 116°16′E	
Mandina	31°18′S 115°55′E	
Mandora	33°51′S 117°56′E	
Mandora	19°45′S 120°51′E	
Manfred	26°27′S 116°32′E	
Mangaroon	23°55′S 115°37′E	
Mangelup	34°10′S 117°1′E	
Mangowine	31°3′S 118°6′E	
Manguel Creek	17°53′S 123°30′E	
Manilldra	34°45′S 117°37′E	
Manilya	34°59′S 117°35′E	
Manna Farm	33°58′S 116°32′E	
Manna Vale	32°57′S 118°10′E	
Mannavale	33°38′S 118°32′E	
Mannaville	31°22′S 116°49′E	
Manor Em	31°48′S 116°56′E	
Mantonvale	33°51′S 117°40′E	
Manurup Valley	34°35′S 117°31′E	
Many Waters	33°30′S 116°58′E	
Manypeaks	34°54′S 118°12′E	
Manyutup	33°37′S 120°1′E	
Maota	33°36′S 117°49′E	
Maplestead	32°33′S 117°3′E	
Maraglen	34°27′S 117°40′E	
Maralcutula	29°51′S 116°7′E	
Marambeena	34°26′S 118°31′E	
Maranalgo	29°23′S 117°50′E	
Maranui	32°3′S 117°45′E	
Marapana	34°2′S 118°39′E	
Mararoa	34°7′S 119°2′E	
Marbling	31°34′S 116°5′E	
Marblon Park	31°34′S 116°5′E	
Mardale	34°57′S 117°38′E	
Mardathuna	24°28′S 114°33′E	
Mardi	33°31′S 116°33′E	
Mardie	21°11′S 115°59′E	
Mardo	30°34′S 115°38′E	
Mareeba	33°24′S 117°3′E	
Mareil	31°33′S 121°49′E	
Margaret River	18°38′S 126°52′E	
Mariecombe	33°9′S 116°55′E	
Marillana	22°38′S 119°24′E	
Marinda Glen	33°14′S 121°28′E	
Marinup Farm	33°58′S 116°1′E	
Marivan Downs	33°39′S 117°4′E	
Marjon	33°29′S 121°29′E	
Markinch	31°17′S 116°8′E	
Marlamerup	34°18′S 119°17′E	
Marley	31°55′S 116°54′E	
Marley Downs	34°2′S 117°33′E	
Marlin	32°56′S 116°36′E	
Marlo	34°1′S 117°56′E	
Marloo	33°32′S 116°31′E	
Marloo	28°19′S 116°11′E	
Marloo	29°0′S 114°59′E	
Marmaling	33°21′S 117°14′E	
Marnup Park	33°34′S 115°2′E	
Maroleigh	33°19′S 120°3′E	
Maroomba Downs	33°29′S 122°35′E	
Maroonah	23°29′S 115°33′E	
Marra	34°24′S 118°44′E	
Marracoonda	33°38′S 117°27′E	
Marralong	34°32′S 118°32′E	
Marri Back	32°36′S 116°34′E	
Marri Vale	30°56′S 115°57′E	
Marribill	33°22′S 116°27′E	
Marricup	33°57′S 117°11′E	
Marriland	33°51′S 117°24′E	
Marrilla	22°58′S 114°28′E	
Marring	32°49′S 117°23′E	
Marron	25°22′S 114°21′E	
Marry Hills	30°50′S 115°48′E	
Marshall Plains	34°29′S 118°31′E	
Martin Downs	32°47′S 117°39′E	
Martinup	33°53′S 117°51′E	
Martling	33°38′S 117°29′E	
Mount Marvel	29°7′S 116°1′E	
Mary Springs	27°46′S 114°41′E	
Mary Vale	32°12′S 118°25′E	
Marydale	34°39′S 117°28′E	
Maryland	33°12′S 117°12′E	
Maryland	33°57′S 116°59′E	
Maryland	31°31′S 116°3′E	
Maryland Too	33°22′S 120°52′E	
Marylands	33°50′S 122°38′E	
Marymia	25°1′S 120°7′E	
Marysmount	34°13′S 118°51′E	
Maryville	31°18′S 115°41′E	
Mason Downs	34°16′S 117°14′E	
Mataura Park	33°14′S 115°47′E	
Matilda Downs	34°26′S 117°34′E	
Matlock	32°52′S 116°27′E	
Matmattin	32°3′S 116°47′E	
Maudeena Park	33°37′S 119°44′E	
Maudella Park	34°40′S 116°5′E	
Maunchel Spring	30°22′S 116°22′E	
Maureens Farm	34°16′S 118°21′E	
Mauri Park	33°46′S 118°0′E	
Maxicar	33°24′S 115°49′E	
Maxley	33°1′S 119°9′E	
Maybenup	33°52′S 117°11′E	
Maybenup Farm	33°55′S 117°13′E	
Maybrook	33°35′S 115°35′E	
Maybrook	33°23′S 116°54′E	
Maydalling	33°40′S 117°8′E	
Maydon	33°37′S 120°13′E	
Mayfield	33°35′S 115°36′E	
Mayfield	33°5′S 118°17′E	
Mayfield	31°32′S 116°27′E	
Maylands	33°50′S 117°19′E	
Maylands	33°17′S 117°29′E	
Mayville	33°11′S 115°51′E	
Maywood	31°56′S 116°56′E	
Mcqueens	29°38′S 115°13′E	
Meadow	26°42′S 114°37′E	
Meadow Vale	33°6′S 116°48′E	
Meadowlea	33°27′S 117°8′E	
Meadowvale	34°59′S 117°40′E	
Mean Mahn	33°39′S 117°36′E	
Mearabundie Outcamp	25°57′S 115°57′E	
Meda	17°22′S 124°0′E	
Medena	33°49′S 117°41′E	
Medlin	33°9′S 116°53′E	
Medlo	33°46′S 117°59′E	
Meeberrie	26°58′S 115°58′E	
Meedo	25°40′S 114°37′E	
Meeline	28°27′S 118°16′E	
Meenaar	31°40′S 116°54′E	
Meenjoro	31°25′S 116°7′E	
Meentheena	21°19′S 120°3′E	
Meeragoolia	24°54′S 114°13′E	
Meilga	22°44′S 115°47′E	
Meka	27°25′S 116°49′E	
Melaleuca	33°36′S 120°45′E	
Melaleuca	17°54′S 122°13′E	
Melangata	27°48′S 116°53′E	
Melijinup	33°47′S 121°53′E	
Melita	29°3′S 121°27′E	
Meljonda	33°52′S 117°43′E	
Mellenbye	28°50′S 116°18′E	
Melrose	29°48′S 116°4′E	
Melrose	31°41′S 116°46′E	
Melrose	27°56′S 121°18′E	
Melrose	31°34′S 116°6′E	
Melrose	30°24′S 116°48′E	
Melton	30°30′S 116°41′E	
Melville	33°15′S 115°50′E	
Menang	28°39′S 115°25′E	
Menangina	29°50′S 121°55′E	
Menardie	30°45′S 115°38′E	
Mendleyarri	29°40′S 121°35′E	
Menota	33°36′S 118°34′E	
Mereworth	34°34′S 117°15′E	
Merildene	33°13′S 116°45′E	
Merilup	33°20′S 118°11′E	
Merindah	34°14′S 119°7′E	
Merinup	33°46′S 117°12′E	
Meripin Hall	33°38′S 117°38′E	
Merivale Farm	33°49′S 122°5′E	
Merkine Valley	32°20′S 116°55′E	
Merleswood	31°30′S 116°48′E	
Merleville	32°45′S 117°59′E	
Merlinleigh	24°19′S 115°11′E	Abandoned
Merlswood	31°30′S 116°48′E	
Merlyn	33°38′S 122°34′E	
Merna	32°4′S 117°21′E	
Merolia	28°47′S 122°39′E	
Merredene	33°55′S 117°29′E	
Merri Merri	33°47′S 120°48′E	
Merribin	33°37′S 117°38′E	
Merrie Shields	34°21′S 117°36′E	
Merrifields	33°43′S 115°12′E	
Merriton	29°30′S 116°0′E	
Merrivale	34°49′S 118°14′E	
Merrivale	33°56′S 116°53′E	
Merrybon	33°43′S 117°18′E	
Merryup	34°38′S 117°37′E	
Mertondale	28°41′S 121°32′E	
Meryl Downs	34°23′S 118°56′E	
Meryon Park	33°59′S 116°29′E	
Mia Mia	23°23′S 114°26′E	
Miarra Springs	28°39′S 114°55′E	
Middalya	23°54′S 114°46′E	
Midvale	31°14′S 116°9′E	
Midway	34°59′S 117°37′E	
Miegunyah	33°34′S 121°49′E	
Milaby	30°37′S 116°40′E	
Milang	34°2′S 117°16′E	
Milarup	33°11′S 119°43′E	
Milbillo	34°11′S 115°12′E	
Mile Pool	32°11′S 116°50′E	
Mileura	26°22′S 117°20′E	
Milgun	25°6′S 118°18′E	
Milhun	29°5′S 116°5′E	
Mill Race Farm	34°15′S 115°9′E	
Millbank	31°8′S 115°32′E	
Millbillillie	26°37′S 120°20′E	
Millbrook	33°41′S 115°3′E	
Millbrook	32°22′S 117°20′E	
Millbrook	31°59′S 116°48′E	
Millbrook Downs	34°53′S 117°49′E	
Millbrook Farm	34°53′S 117°51′E	
Millgool Outcamp	26°52′S 120°8′E	
Millijiddee	18°49′S 124°57′E	
Millinup	34°42′S 117°54′E	
Millrose	26°24′S 120°57′E	
Millstream	21°35′S 117°4′E	
Millstream Outcamp	21°39′S 116°52′E	
Milly Milly	26°5′S 116°42′E	
Milparinga	34°43′S 118°26′E	
Milton Farm	31°42′S 116°36′E	
Milton Park	33°28′S 116°21′E	
Milurie Outcamp	27°33′S 121°50′E	
Milyeannup	34°18′S 115°23′E	
Mimegarra	30°51′S 115°27′E	
Minapre	29°32′S 115°50′E	
Minara	28°55′S 121°48′E	
Minarup	34°27′S 119°16′E	
Mindarra	29°4′S 115°11′E	
Minderoo	22°0′S 115°3′E	
Minding	33°20′S 117°6′E	
Mindora	33°58′S 117°37′E	
Mineda	32°52′S 117°45′E	
Minga Flats	33°2′S 115°53′E	
Mingah Springs	24°57′S 118°43′E	
Minganooka	29°59′S 115°58′E	
Mingara	29°10′S 115°28′E	
Mingarell	34°8′S 116°57′E	
Minilya	23°51′S 113°58′E	
Mininer	23°36′S 117°41′E	
Mininer Outcamp	23°35′S 117°34′E	
Minjin	29°35′S 116°4′E	
Minlaton	33°46′S 117°56′E	
Minnathorpe	31°37′S 116°39′E	
Minnawarra	33°37′S 117°37′E	
Minnawarra	32°32′S 117°41′E	
Minneroo	32°23′S 117°35′E	
Minnie Creek	24°2′S 115°41′E	
Minnikin	33°49′S 120°58′E	
Minninup	33°29′S 115°33′E	
Minston Park	31°16′S 116°9′E	
Mintarra	33°43′S 121°24′E	
Minvalara	34°19′S 119°8′E	
Minyara	34°24′S 117°10′E	
Minylup	33°52′S 117°38′E	
Miourding	33°22′S 117°14′E	
Mirboo	34°28′S 118°30′E	
Mirilla	31°16′S 115°46′E	
Miripin	33°32′S 117°12′E	
Mirrabooka	34°4′S 116°38′E	
Mirravale	33°38′S 115°4′E	
Mirreanda	33°43′S 115°16′E	
Misery Farm	32°20′S 116°7′E	
Mission	33°2′S 119°9′E	
Mistic Park	33°40′S 117°29′E	
Mitchell	29°23′S 115°28′E	
Mitchell River	15°7′S 125°48′E	
Mobedine	31°50′S 116°50′E	
Mokine	32°57′S 116°30′E	
Mokine	31°44′S 116°34′E	
Mokup	33°38′S 116°48′E	
Moleburn	33°39′S 115°55′E	
Monalta	33°47′S 117°38′E	
Mondarra	29°17′S 115°10′E	
Mongup	34°11′S 118°19′E	
Monivae	33°37′S 121°15′E	
Monjebup	34°19′S 118°38′E	
Monks Eley	29°8′S 115°27′E	
Montana	30°32′S 116°18′E	
Monte Bellos	33°44′S 117°49′E	
Monte Verde	34°29′S 117°27′E	
Monte-vista	33°24′S 119°56′E	
Monterey	34°30′S 117°0′E	
Montoya	34°7′S 115°8′E	
Montray	33°21′S 115°49′E	
Moogooree	24°4′S 115°13′E	
Moojebing House	33°36′S 117°30′E	
Moojelup	33°1′S 115°53′E	
Moojepin	33°38′S 117°32′E	
Mooka	24°58′S 114°48′E	
Moola Bulla	18°11′S 127°30′E	
Moolabar	34°42′S 117°49′E	
Mooladarra	29°35′S 115°28′E	
Mooloo Downs	25°2′S 115°59′E	
Mooloogool	26°6′S 119°6′E	
Moolyall Downs	33°21′S 120°11′E	
Moonadowns	33°44′S 121°36′E	
Moonaralla	34°50′S 117°49′E	
Moonaree	33°0′S 117°15′E	
Moondah Brook	31°21′S 115°56′E	
Moondaminning	33°35′S 116°58′E	
Moonera	31°43′S 126°35′E	
Moonta	33°1′S 121°43′E	
Moora Downs	33°27′S 118°46′E	
Moorak	32°1′S 117°47′E	
Moorarie	25°55′S 117°36′E	
Moore Park	30°42′S 116°1′E	
Moorilla	33°0′S 116°55′E	
Moorilla	34°31′S 117°16′E	
Moorilla	33°0′S 116°54′E	
Moorillup	34°24′S 117°23′E	
Mooringa	34°9′S 116°47′E	
Moorna	31°11′S 116°56′E	
Moort-lea	33°53′S 118°47′E	
Moorundie Farm	33°50′S 117°1′E	
Mooryary	29°15′S 115°20′E	
Mootwingie	33°45′S 117°59′E	
Morapoi	29°24′S 121°23′E	
Morava	33°43′S 115°20′E	
Moredella	30°32′S 115°56′E	
Moree	33°8′S 116°50′E	
Morialta	33°34′S 117°59′E	
Morialta	31°45′S 116°50′E	
Morilla	34°11′S 118°35′E	
Morinda	32°30′S 117°38′E	
Morley Farm	33°45′S 117°48′E	
Morling	32°35′S 117°23′E	
Morlup	33°32′S 116°38′E	
Morning Glory	32°26′S 118°29′E	
Morning Star	33°47′S 121°42′E	
Mornington	17°31′S 126°6′E	
Moroonda Downs	33°15′S 115°53′E	
Morrel Grove	33°17′S 117°11′E	
Morrel Hill	33°23′S 117°23′E	
Morreldale	32°9′S 117°6′E	
Morrell Glen	33°39′S 117°39′E	
Morskate	31°44′S 116°33′E	
Mortdale	33°49′S 117°55′E	
Mortigallup	34°27′S 117°30′E	
Mortlock	31°42′S 116°53′E	
Morton	32°5′S 117°22′E	
Mosceil	29°16′S 115°47′E	
Mosgiel	34°20′S 117°33′E	
Mossvale	33°37′S 117°50′E	
Mostyn	34°40′S 117°54′E	
Moulyerup	33°49′S 117°41′E	
Mount Adams	29°21′S 115°14′E	
Mount Amhurst	18°23′S 126°59′E	
Mount Amy	32°8′S 116°59′E	
Mount Anderson	18°2′S 123°56′E	
Mount Augustus	24°18′S 116°54′E	
Mount Barker Estate	34°38′S 117°36′E	
Mount Barnett	16°40′S 125°57′E	
Mount Brockman	22°18′S 117°18′E	
Mount Brown	33°23′S 116°55′E	
Mount Bruce	22°35′S 118°27′E	Abandoned
Mount Burges	30°51′S 121°7′E	
Mount Cahill Outcamp	24°32′S 114°42′E	
Mount Carnage	30°22′S 121°3′E	
Mount Celia	29°28′S 122°29′E	
Mount Clere	25°6′S 117°36′E	
Mount Clifford Outcamp	28°28′S 121°3′E	
Mount Divide	22°24′S 120°51′E	
Mount Elizabeth	16°18′S 126°11′E	
Mount Elvire	29°22′S 119°36′E	
Mount Farmer	27°53′S 117°33′E	
Mount Florance	21°47′S 117°52′E	
Mount Gibson	29°36′S 117°24′E	
Mount Gould	25°48′S 117°23′E	
Mount Grey Outcamp	27°20′S 121°5′E	
Mount Hale	26°7′S 117°30′E	
Mount Hart	16°49′S 124°55′E	
Mount Hawke	30°6′S 116°20′E	
Mount Hork	28°35′S 114°48′E	
Mount Horner	29°7′S 115°4′E	
Mount House	17°3′S 125°42′E	
Mount Howick	33°45′S 122°45′E	
Mount Jackson	30°12′S 119°7′E	
Mount James	24°51′S 116°54′E	
Mount John	31°31′S 116°32′E	
Mount Jowlaenga	17°29′S 123°3′E	
Mount Joy	30°30′S 116°19′E	
Mount Keith	27°17′S 120°30′E	
Mount Lookout	31°59′S 119°6′E	
Mount Madden	33°17′S 119°47′E	
Mount Mcleod	34°59′S 117°14′E	
Mount Minnie	21°58′S 115°26′E	
Mount Monger	31°1′S 121°54′E	
Mount Narryer	26°35′S 115°55′E	
Mount Neverest	33°46′S 115°21′E	
Mount Newman	23°19′S 119°45′E	
Mount Oscar	18°3′S 125°27′E	
Mount Padbury	25°42′S 118°5′E	
Mount Phillips	24°24′S 116°18′E	
Mount Pleasant	30°44′S 115°58′E	
Mount Pleasant	31°18′S 115°45′E	
Mount Remarkable	29°19′S 121°59′E	
Mount Sandiman	24°25′S 115°24′E	
Mount Satirist	21°5′S 118°8′E	
Mount Stuart	22°27′S 116°3′E	
Mount Vernon	24°14′S 118°14′E	
Mount Vetters	30°20′S 121°17′E	
Mount View	27°55′S 114°35′E	
Mount View	33°55′S 118°3′E	
Mount Weld	28°46′S 122°26′E	
Mount Windarra	28°29′S 122°16′E	
Mount Wittenoom	27°25′S 116°41′E	
Mountain View	34°8′S 119°7′E	
Mouquet	33°55′S 115°1′E	
Mourambie	31°28′S 116°29′E	
Mouroubra	29°48′S 117°42′E	
Mowen	33°56′S 115°12′E	
Mowla Bluff	18°42′S 123°42′E	
Mt Noddy	31°35′S 116°53′E	
Muccan	20°38′S 120°3′E	
Muckenburra	31°20′S 115°47′E	
Muckross	33°35′S 117°26′E	
Mug Farm	29°4′S 115°0′E	
Muggon	26°37′S 115°33′E	
Mulga Downs	22°6′S 118°28′E	
Mulga Downs Outcamp	22°20′S 118°59′E	
Mulgaroona Outcamp	28°27′S 120°29′E	
Mulgul	24°50′S 118°28′E	
Mullangar	33°34′S 117°51′E	
Mullangulling	33°3′S 117°54′E	
Mullaroola	33°5′S 115°51′E	
Mullering Park	30°35′S 115°29′E	
Mullgarnup	33°41′S 115°25′E	
Mulureen	32°2′S 117°46′E	
Mulyie	20°28′S 119°31′E	
Mumbiba	29°2′S 115°7′E	
Mumbida	28°58′S 114°59′E	
Munaleeun	34°48′S 117°51′E	
Munbinia	28°15′S 117°26′E	
Mundabullangana	20°31′S 118°4′E	
Mundalla	33°15′S 117°57′E	
Mundalup	33°58′S 116°20′E	
Mundaringa	33°53′S 115°12′E	
Mundora Downs	30°58′S 116°0′E	
Mundrabilla	31°51′S 127°51′E	
Mundunning Farm	31°27′S 116°51′E	
Mundup	32°31′S 115°59′E	
Mungari	30°52′S 121°17′E	
Mungaterra	29°1′S 115°28′E	
Mungedar	30°28′S 115°39′E	
Munglinup Station	33°31′S 120°53′E	
Mungrup	34°48′S 117°46′E	
Munja Park	28°48′S 115°3′E	
Munjeroo	28°15′S 120°8′E	
Munji Downs	33°41′S 120°49′E	
Munkayarra	17°28′S 123°43′E	
Munyantine	33°23′S 116°44′E	
Muralgarra	28°32′S 117°2′E	
Murchison Downs	26°48′S 118°59′E	
Murchison House	27°39′S 114°14′E	
Murdong Farm	33°45′S 117°40′E	
Murern Farm	34°46′S 117°59′E	
Murgoo	27°22′S 116°26′E	
Murninni	31°9′S 116°53′E	
Murra Murra	33°44′S 122°8′E	
Murramunda	23°30′S 120°22′E	
Murray Downs	33°44′S 122°4′E	
Murray Field	34°53′S 118°0′E	
Murray Valley	34°34′S 117°22′E	
Murrena	33°5′S 116°55′E	
Murrianda	33°39′S 115°42′E	
Murrin Murrin	32°52′S 117°6′E	
Murroa West Farm	33°40′S 122°13′E	
Murrum	28°16′S 117°23′E	
Murrumbah	29°9′S 115°14′E	
Murrumbong	34°16′S 115°6′E	
Murrundie	34°13′S 119°11′E	
Myall	33°26′S 116°42′E	
Myalong	33°51′S 117°49′E	
Myalup	33°7′S 115°44′E	
Myamba	33°47′S 120°12′E	
Myamba	34°24′S 119°18′E	
Myaree Farm	33°18′S 116°18′E	
Mycumbene	33°58′S 117°5′E	
Mylerup Farm	33°58′S 117°2′E	
Mylor	33°52′S 115°52′E	
Mymore	33°10′S 116°57′E	
Myniloo	30°42′S 115°40′E	
Myola Stud	33°29′S 116°44′E	
Myolo	33°48′S 120°30′E	
Myona Downs	33°43′S 121°26′E	
Myoora	34°16′S 118°50′E	
Myora	34°29′S 117°31′E	
Myroodah	18°7′S 124°16′E	
Mystic Park	34°21′S 117°12′E	
Mytle Valley	29°55′S 116°20′E	
