= Saviour Montebello =

Maltese academic (1762–1809)

- Born: 9 June 1762; Żejtun, Hospitaller Malta
- Died: 18 April 1809 (aged 46); Bormla, Malta Protectorate
- Burial place: Valletta, Malta
- Occupation: Professor of philosophy

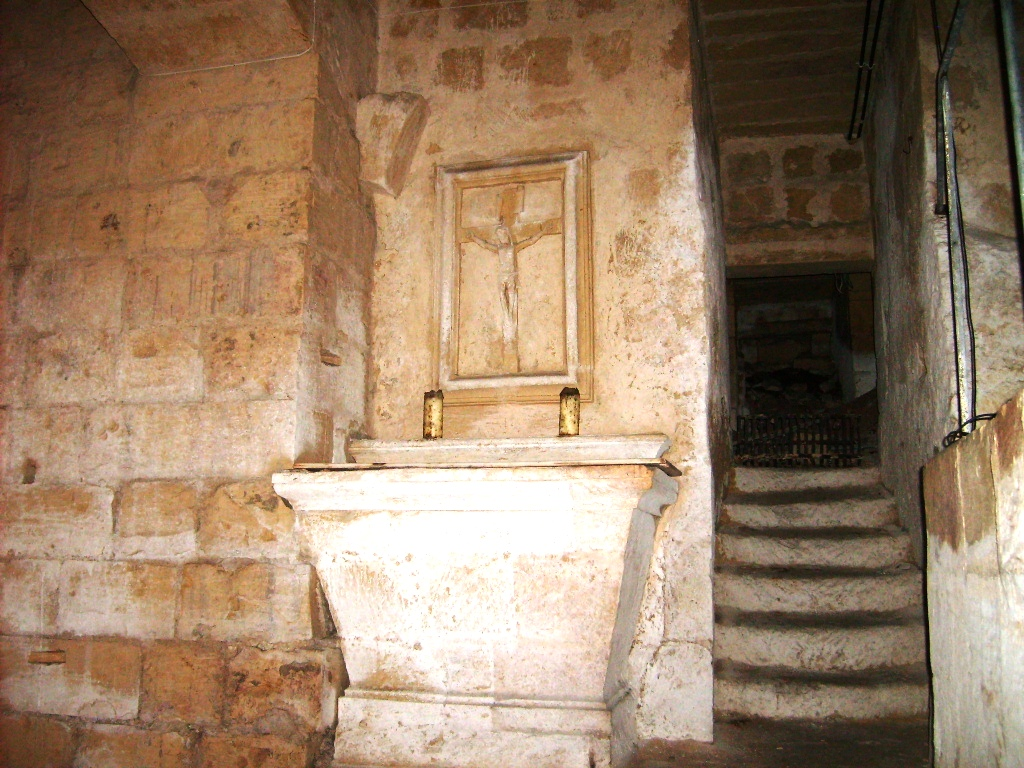
Burial place of Saviour Montebello (1762–1809) beneath the parish church of St Paul Shipwreck in Valletta

Saviour Montebello (9 June 1762 – 18 April 1809) was a Maltese Doctor of Theology, a professor of philosophy at the University of Malta, and a Parish priest of Bormla. After Napoleon took over the Maltese islands in 1798, Montebello took an active part in the resistance of the Maltese against the French around his home-town at Żejtun. Afterwards, when the French Napoleonic forces had been ousted, and the British set up a provisional government in Malta, he was the first to be appointed to the Chair of Philosophy at the University of Malta. He held the office for almost four years, mainly teaching logic and metaphysics. He relinquished the Chair because he was appointed parish priest of Bormla, the last to hold the office under this title because subsequently the parish was promoted to a Collegiate led by Archpriests. He held the office of parish priest for only five years due to his premature death at age 46.

== Biography ==
=== Birth and formation ===
Saviour Montebello, son of Joseph (1730–1768) and Catherine (née; 1731–?), was born at Żejtun, Malta, on 9 June 1762. His parents had married at Żejtun parish church of St. Catherine of Alexandria on 26 September 1752. and Saviour was their fourth child out of six. He was baptised on the same day of his birth at Żejtun's parish church by the deputy parish priest, Joseph Saliba, and given the names Saviour, Francis Xavier and Anthony. His godparents were Joseph Buttigieg, son of Luke, and Rose, wife of Francis Bugeja, both from the Żejtun parish.

At the age of 19, in 1781, Montebello entered the bishop's seminary at Floriana to study for the priesthood. As was required at the time, his family donated him with a patrimony which could pay for his seminary expenses. This consisted of four properties: two partitions of grasslands around Tas-Silġ (limits of Żejtun), and two edifices at Żejtun's village centre. The patrimony was temporarily entrusted to the administration of Michael Pulis, the husband of Montebello's older sister, Mary.

Montebello was ordained a priest in 1787, six years after entering the seminary, most probably by the then Bishop of Malta, Carmelo Scicluna (bishop between 1875 and 1888). Thereafter, Montebello seems to have been stably assigned to pastoral work within and around the parish of Żejtun. Such work does not appear to have hindered him from studying for his Doctorate in Theology. This seems to have been done in Malta (and not abroad). In this case his studies would probably have been pursued, as was normally done, at the Collegium Melitense in Valletta. By 1797, that is ten years after his ordination, he had already acquired his S.T.D.

=== Family relations ===
Montebello was well connected through his family. His cousin, Giuseppe Montebello (1713–1833), from Tarxien, was the son of Montebello's uncle, Peter, and a well-heeled merchant. He was Capo di Casal Tarxien (Head of Tarxien), elected by the gentry there to represent them in all administrative matters. During the French presence in Malta (1798), he was chosen to be part of the committee administering one of the twelve municipalities created by Napoleon, that which included Tarxien, Żejtun, Żabbar and Għaxaq. Only three months later, however, Montebello was very much involved in the organised resistance of the Maltese against the French between 1798 and 1800. As head of the local provisional government at Tarxien, he was appointed capo battaglione (battalion leader) with operational responsibilities around that locality. Together with others, he contributed financially to the two-year war effort, and also donated (on 24 December 1798) a considerable part of his wealth to procure wheat and other supplies from Sicily to ease the food shortage that ensued from the revolt. When the British provisionally took over the government of the Maltese islands instead of the French Republican Commission, Giuseppe was elected by the gentry at Tarxien (18 February 1799) to be head of their locality, and thus part of the National Congress created by the representative of the British provisional government, Alexander Ball. Later, Giuseppe was appointed Logotenente di Governo (Government Lieutenant) of Tarxien. Afterwards, when the British officially became lords of the land, and partitioned the Maltese islands into six districts, Giuseppe was appointed Deputy Lieutenant of the district comprising Tarxien, Paola, Żejtun, Żabbar, Gudja and Luqa (28 June 1815). Giuseppe's house at Tarxien, built by government funds as recompense for his share in the revolt, still stands unto this day, and is a tourist attraction.

Another influential close relative, Giuseppe Pulis Montebello (1783–1855), was Montebello's nephew. He was from Żejtun and resided in Valletta together with his Italian wife Carlotta Bertelli. Giuseppe lived for many years in Livorno, Italy, where he married. They had at least five children. He and his wife settled in Malta for just a decade or so, and returned to Livorno a few months before Giuseppe's death in 1855. He was a well-off and self-sufficient merchant. He too was elected to the National Assembly (1849–54). He was very popular with voters, obtaining the largest number of popular votes. Three publications of his are known. In 1824 he published Chtieb il Kari Yau Dahla'al ilsien Malti (A Book of Maltese Reading or An Introduction to the Maltese Language); in 1826 Trattat Fuq l'Obblighi Tal-Bniedem (A Treatise on the Duties of Man); and in 1847 Rendiconto pratico del Campo Esperimentale dell'Est (A practical Statement on the Experimental Camp in the East). The first two are credited to be the first books written entirely in the Maltese language.

=== Resistance ===
Together with many others, including his uncle Giuseppe, between 1798 and 1800 Montebello was part of the resistance of the Maltese against the French. He was stationed at Żejtun (at Tal-Borg), and gave his share within a team of resistance fighters. The team's job was to intercept any manoeuvring by or to the French troops blockaded in Valletta through the road leading to Cottonera from the east, and to organise and manage supplies around that area. Despite some skirmishes―which had even left some casualties on both sides―Montebello's involvement does not seem to have been military, as some suggested, but rather of a logistical nature. In fact, together with two others (Luigi Agius, a doctor of canon and civil law, and Vincenzo Borg, later a Companion of the Order of St. Michael and St. George) Montebello served as consultore legale (legal adviser) under the command of Giuseppe Abela. The team's General Headquarters was situated at San Giuseppe (Hamrun), under the general command of Francesco Saverio Caruana. Caruana was a Monsignor who had studied philosophy under Michael Xerri. He was professor of philosophy and mathematics at the bishop's seminary at Mdina, and later appointed Bishop of Malta (1831–47).

=== Professor of Philosophy ===
Following the French capitulation on 5 September 1800, Montebello was appointed professor of the chair of philosophy at the University of Malta. The chair had been suspended by Napoleon on 18 June 1798, but then reinstated by the British by Alexander Ball. On 5 November 1800, Montebello was chosen to be professor of logic and metaphysics, with an honorarium of 200 scudi per annum. He was chosen for this office by the newly appointed rector, Saverio Caruana, Montebello's former 'priest-in-arms'. This was done with the approval of Malta's provisional government (which included Montebello's cousin, Giuseppe).

On the day of his appointment, 5 November, together with the other newly appointed professors, Montebello called on the rector at his residence in Valletta to thank him for their appointments. Caruana received them most kindly and, as was formerly the practice during the time of the Knights Hospitallers, they all proceeded to the palace of the bishop, Vincenzo Labini, in Valletta who then administered to them the oath of office. On the following day, 6 November, professors, students and members of the better educated classes assembled in the main hall of the University of Malta in Valletta, where the Augustinian Vincenzo Thei (the professor of moral theology), delivered a solemn oration for the success of the new studies. The British governor, Alexander Ball, was also present for the occasion. Lectures started a week later, on 13 November, after the solemn intonation of the hymn Veni Creator Spiritus in the university church, also at Valletta. Then each professor went to his lecture room and gave a public lecture.

Montebello's academic remit at the university was of two hours every week. A welcome development occurred on 13 March 1802, when the British governor, Alexander Ball, re-established the practice of conferring degrees, thus giving more weight to the academic institution. In the following month the first ceremony of the conferrement of degrees under British rule was held. This must have brought on, a few months later, on 5 May 1802, the increase in salary of the university professors, including Montebello's, from two to three hundred scudi per annum by the British Civil Commissioner, Charles Cameron. Following these developments, no other events of note seem to have occurred at the university up till 1813, well after Montebello's time there.

=== Parish Priest ===
In 1804, Montebello relinquished the chair of philosophy when he was appointed by Bishop Vincenzo Labini as parish priest of Civitatis Cospiquæ (Bormla). On 3 October of that year, he was succeeded at the university by the professor of humanistic literature and secretary of the university, Peter Mallia, a doctor of canon and civil law.

Montebello became vicar (or Parochus prælectus) of Bormla on 23 June 1804, and immediately took up residence there together with his sister Vincenza. He took official possession of the parish (as Parochus et Rector) on the following 26 July. He was the sixteenth parish priest of Bormla since the parish's inception on 15 September 1586. However, as it happened, he was also its last parish priest, since in 1822, during the tenure of Montebello's successor as parish priest, Giuseppe Bezzina, the parish became a Collegiate by decree of Pope Pius VII.

Apart from the usual pastoral duties as parish priest, at Bormla, Montebello founded, in May 1805, the Confraternity of St. Agatha and a few months later, on 15 September 1805, the Confraternity of St. Michael.

=== Death ===
Montebello remained parish priest for five years. He died suddenly and prematurely at his residence in Bormla on 18 April 1809, aged 46, Though the last baptism he administered was just two days before his death, on the April 16, he was apparently too ill to officiate at a marriage celebrated on April 11. Oddly enough, his funeral was not held at Bormla, as would have been normal practice, but at the parish church of his birthplace, Żejtun, with the participation of the clergy serving at Bormla. Stranger still, for some reason yet unknown he was not buried at Żejtun but was transported again, this time to Valletta, and buried in the crypt of the Collegiate church of St. Paul's Shipwreck, in the part reserved for priests. In gratitude towards the clergy of Bormla, a few days after the funeral, on the 23 April, his sister, Vincenza Montebello, donated 50 scudi to the Bormla collagate per i poveri di Cospicua (for the poor of Bormla). Several masses were sung by the Bormla clergy for his repose on the anniversary of his death in the succeeding five years (until 1814). More masses were sung for his repose by the clergy at Żejtun almost fifty years later, in 1855, and in succeeding years, by bequest of Giuseppe Pulis Montebello.

== Works ==
There is as yet no indication that Montebello ever published any works, philosophical or otherwise. In all probability he did not.

His class notes on logic and metaphysics, subjects which he taught for four years at the University of Malta, do not seem to have survived, not even in indirect form (by his students). At least, nothing is yet known about their whereabouts. Having said this, however, it might not be irrelevant to point out that the hundreds of manuscripts held at the archive of the Collegiate of Bormla―one likely place where Montebello's writings might be held―are still not catalogued. This, as yet, makes it impossible to know for sure whether anything of his philosophical notes survived. To date, it is not known whether Montebello drew up any last will, as was usually done.

== See also ==
Philosophy in Malta

== Sources ==
Archives:

- [AAM] – Acta Academiæ Melitensis (Chronicles of the University of Malta). Two volumes: 1800–1809; 1800–1932. Archives. University of Malta: Malta.
- [AACM] – Archive of the Archbishop's Curia: Floriana, Malta.
- [ACB] – Collegiate Archive: Bormla, Malta.
- [APB] – Parish Archive: Bormla, Malta.
- [APPV] – Parish Archive, St. Paul Shipwreck: Valletta, Malta.
- [APT] – Parish Archive: Tarxien, Malta.
- [APZ] – Parish Archive: Zejtun, Malta.

Publications:

- Abela, J. (1999) 'Dun Salv Montebello', Programm tal-Festa (Feast Programme). Bormla: Malta.
- Abela, J. (2008) 'Iz-Zejtuni Guzeppi Pulis Montebello: Kittieb u politiku (1783–1855)'; Joseph Pulis Montebello of Zejtun: Writer and politician (1783–1855), Lehen il-Malti, no. 31, pp. 53–57.
- Agius, L.S. (1968) The University of Malta under British Rule, B.A. Hons. thesis (unpublished). Malta.
- Battistino, V. (1992) Hal Tarxien (Tarxien). Malta.
- Bonnici, A. (1985) 'Ir-Raba' Centinarju tal-Parrocca' (The Fourth Centenary of the Parish). Bormla, vol. 11, no. 131, pp. 1, 10, 12.
- Cachia, L. (2000) Habbew l-Ilsien Malti (They Loved the Maltese Language). Malta.
- Camilleri, J.C. (2001) 'Il-kult lejn wahda mill-Patruni ta' Malta' (The cult towards one of Malta's patron saints), Il-Mument, 4 February, p. 35.
- Cassar Pullicino, J. (1958) 'The re-opening of the university in 1800'. Journal of the Faculty of Arts. Malta.
- Cassar, M. (2003) The Surnames of the Maltese Islands: An etymological dictionary. Book Distributors Ltd.: Malta.
- Castagna, P.P. (1985) L-Istorja ta' Malta bil-Gzejjer Taghha (The History of Malta with its Islands). Three volumes. Malta.
- Debono J. (1996), 'La societá delle scuole normali della Valletta: a brief historical backdrop' (The Valletta society for public schooling). Melita Historica (New Series). Vol. 12, no. 1, pp. 47–74.
- Farrugia Randon, P. (1991) Camillo Sciberras. Malta.
- Ferres, A. (1866) Descrizione Storica delle Chiese di Malta e Gozo. Malta.
- Frendo, H. (2004) Storja ta' Malta (History of Malta). Vol. III. Klabb Kotba Maltin: Malta.
- Laferla, A.V. (1938) British Malta. Vol. I. Malta.
- Mifsud Bonnici, R. (1960) Dizzjunarju Bijo-Bibljografiku Nazzjonali (National Bio-Bibliographical Dictionary). Department of Information: Malta.
- Mifsud, A. (1907) Origine della Sovranità Inglese su Malta (Origin of British Sovereignty over Malta). Tipografia del Malta: Malta.
- Montebello, M. (2001) Il-Ktieb tal-Filosofija f'Malta (A Source Book of Philosophy in Malta). Two volumes. PIN Publications: Malta.
- Naudi, E. (1848) Ricordo di Mons. Francesco Saverio Caruana (In Memory of Mgr. Francis Saviour Caruana). Malta.
- Tabone, L. (2001) L-Istorja tal-Kolleggjata Perinsinji ta' Bormla bid-Dmirijiet u d-Drittijiet li kellha (The History of the Most Preeminent Collegiate of Bormla with the Rights and Duties it possessed). Malta.
- Testa, C. (1979–82) Maz-Zewg Nahat tas-Swar (On Both Sides of the Bastions). Three volumes (1979, 1980, 1982 respectively). Malta.
- Vella, A. (1979). Storja ta' Malta (History of Malta). Vol. II. Klabb Kotba Maltin: Malta.
- Vella, E.B. (1932) Storja ta' Hal Tarxien u Rahal Gdid (History of Tarxien and Paola). Malta.
- Zammit, T. (1913) L'Università di Malta: Origine e sviluppo (The University of Malta: Origins and development). Malta.
