= Zebra seahorse =

Zebra Seahorse

Conservation status
- Data Deficient (IUCN 3.1)
- CITES Appendix II

Scientific classification
- Kingdom: Animalia
- Phylum: Chordata
- Class: Actinopterygii
- Order: Syngnathiformes
- Family: Syngnathidae
- Genus: Hippocampus
- Species: H. zebra

Binomial name
- Hippocampus zebra Whitley, 1964

Synonyms
- Hippocampus montebelloensis Kuiter, 2001

Species of fish

The zebra seahorse (Hippocampus zebra) is a species of fish in the family Syngnathidae. It is endemic to northern Australia.

Habitat This species of fish has been found inshore in and around coral reefs and it can also be found in areas with sand and mud bottoms, possibly associated with gorgonians. The maximum reported depth is 69 m (226 ft). It is ovoviviparous, the male carries the eggs in a brood pouch that is situated under the tail.
