= Montebello tenuis =

Scientific classification
- Domain: Eukaryota
- Kingdom: Animalia
- Phylum: Arthropoda
- Subphylum: Chelicerata
- Class: Arachnida
- Order: Araneae
- Infraorder: Araneomorphae
- Family: Gnaphosidae
- Genus: Montebello; Hogg, 1914
- Species: M. tenuis

Binomial name
- Montebello tenuis Hogg, 1914

Genus of spiders

Montebello is a monotypic genus of Australian ground spiders containing the single species, Montebello tenuis. It was first described by Henry Roughton Hogg in 1914, who separated the single species from the Liocranidae. It has only been found in Australia.
