= List of jazz tunes =

This is an A–Z list of jazz tunes, which includes jazz standards, minor jazz standards, pop standards, and film song classics which have been sung or performed in jazz on numerous occasions and are considered part of the jazz repertoire. For a chronological list of jazz standards with author details, see the lists in the box on the right. Entries in italics are alternative titles for songs that appear elsewhere on the list. The songs are listed alphabetically, disregarding the articles "a", "an", and "the" at the beginning of titles.

== 0–9 ==
- 12th Street Rag
- 26-2
- 42nd Street
- 500 Miles High
- 502 Blues
- 52nd Street Theme
- 9:20 Special

== A ==
- A-Tisket, A-Tasket
- "A" Train (see Take the "A" Train)
- About a Quarter to Nine
- Ace in the Hole
- Ac-Cent-Tchu-Ate the Positive
- Across the Alley from the Alamo
- Adieu Tristesse (orig. A Felicidade)
- Affirmation
- African Flower
- After You, Who?
- An Affair to Remember (Our Love Affair)
- Afro Blue
- After Hours
- After I Say I'm Sorry (orig. What Can I Say After...)
- After You've Gone
- Afternoon in Paris
- Água de Beber
- Águas de Março (a.k.a. Waters of March)
- (Ah, the Apple Trees) When the World Was Young
- Ah-Leu-Cha
- Ain't Got Nothin' But the Blues
- Ain't Misbehavin'
- Ain't No Use
- Ain't That a Kick in the Head?
- Ain't Nobody's Business
- Ain't She Sweet
- Air Mail Special
- Ain't We Got Fun?
- Airegin
- Alabamy Bound
- Alexander's Ragtime Band
- Alfie
- Algo Bueno (a.k.a. Woody 'n' You)
- Alice in Wonderland
- All Alone
- All Blues
- All by Myself
- All God's Chillun Got Rhythm
- All I Do Is Dream of You
- All in Love is Fair
- All My Life
- All My Tomorrows
- All of Me
- All of You
- All or Nothing at All
- All the Clouds'll Roll Away (orig. Liza (All the Clouds'll Roll Away))
- All the Things You Are
- All the Way
- All Through the Night
- All Too Soon
- Allen's Alley
- Almost Blue
- Almost Like Being in Love
- Alone
- Alone Together
- Alright, Okay, You Win
- Always
- Always True to You in My Fashion
- Am I Blue?
- Amazing Grace
- American Patrol
- Amor
- And Her Tears Flowed Like Wine
- And I Love Her
- And So It Goes
- And the Angels Sing
- Angel Eyes
- Another Star
- Anthropology
- Any Place I Hang My Hat Is Home
- Anything for You
- Anything Goes
- April in Paris
- Aquarela do Brasil
- Aquarius
- Aquellos Ojos Verdes (a.k.a. Green Eyes)
- Aren't You Glad You're You?
- Are You Havin' Any Fun?
- Around the World
- As Long as He Needs Me
- As Long as I Live
- As Time Goes By
- Ask Me Now
- At Last
- At Long Last Love
- At Sundown
- (At the) Darktown Strutters' Ball
- At the Jazz Band Ball
- Au Privave
- Auld Lang Syne
- Aunt Hagar's Blues
- Autumn in New York
- Autumn Leaves
- Avalon
- Azure

== B ==
- Baby Dear
- Baby Face
- Baby, It's Cold Outside
- Baby Won't You Please Come Home
- Back Home Again in Indiana
- Back in Your Own Backyard
- Backwater Blues
- Bad and the Beautiful
- Bags' Groove
- Bahia
- (The Ballad of) Mack the Knife
- Ballin' the Jack
- Baltimore Oriole
- Barbados
- Basin Street Blues
- Baubles, Bangles and Beads
- Be a Clown
- Be Careful, It's My Heart
- Be My Love
- Beale Street Blues
- Beat Me Daddy, Eight to the Bar
- Beautiful Black Eyes
- Beautiful Love
- Beatrice
- Beauty and the Beast
- Bebop in Pastel (a.k.a. Bouncing with Bud)
- Because of You
- Begin the Beguine
- Bei Mir Bistu Shein (a.k.a. Bei Mir Bist Du Schoen)
- Bemsha Swing
- Bernie's Tune
- Besame Mucho
- Bess, You Is My Woman Now
- Bessie's Blues
- The Best Is Yet to Come
- The Best Thing for You (Would Be Me)
- The Best Things in Life Are Free
- Best Wishes
- Between the Devil and the Deep Blue Sea
- Bewitched, Bothered, and Bewildered
- Beyond the Sea
- Bidin' My Time
- Big Butter and Egg Man
- Big Foot
- Big Noise From Winnetka
- Big Nick
- Big Spender
- Bill
- Bill Bailey, Won't You Please Come Home
- Billie's Bounce
- Birdland
- Birks' Works
- The Birth of the Blues
- Black and Blue
- Black and Tan Fantasy
- Black Coffee
- Black Narcissus
- Black Nile
- Black Orpheus
- Blame It on My Youth
- Blood Count
- Bloomdido
- A Blossom Fell
- Blue and Sentimental
- Blue Bossa
- Blue Devil Blues
- Blue in Green
- Blue Lou
- Blue Monk
- Blue Moon
- Blue 'n' Boogie
- Blue Rondo à la Turk
- Blue Room
- Blue Skies
- Blue Train
- Blue Turning Grey Over You
- Blueberry Hill
- Blues for Alice
- Blues in My Heart
- Blues in the Closet
- Blues in the Night
- Bluesette
- Body and Soul
- Bohemia After Dark
- Bolivar Blues
- Bolivia
- Boplicity
- Born to Be Blue
- Bouncing with Bud
- Brazil (orig. Aquarela do Brasil)
- The Breeze and I
- Bright Size Life
- Broadway
- Broadway Blues
- Bugle Call Rag
- But Beautiful
- But Not for Me
- By Myself
- By the Light of the Silvery Moon
- Bye, Bye, Baby (Baby Goodbye)
- Bye Bye Blackbird
- Bye Bye Blues

== C ==
- C Jam Blues
- Ça, c'est l'amour
- Cabin in the Sky
- Cakewalk
- Call Me Irresponsible
- Canadian Sunset
- Candy
- Can't Help Lovin' Dat Man (resp. ...Gal)
- Can't We Be Friends
- Cantaloupe Island
- Caravan
- Careless Love
- Carioca
- Carolina in the Morning
- Cast Your Fate to the Wind
- C.C. Rider (see See See Rider)
- C'est Magnifique
- C'est si bon
- Centerpiece
- Central Park West
- Ceora
- Chameleon
- Change of Season
- Change Partners
- Charade
- Charleston
- Chasin' the Bird
- Chattanooga Choo Choo
- Cheek to Cheek
- Chega de Saudade
- Chelsea Bridge
- Cherokee
- Cherry
- Cherry Pink and Apple Blossom White
- Cheryl
- Chicago (That Toddlin' Town)
- A Child Is Born
- Children of the Night
- China Boy
- Chinatown My Chinatown
- Chippie
- Chitlins con Carne
- Chlo-e
- The Christmas Song
- Christmas Time Is Here
- Christopher Columbus
- Chuva Delicada (orig. of The Gentle Rain)
- Cielito Lindo
- Clarinet Marmalade
- Close Enough for Love
- Close Your Eyes
- Cocktails for Two
- Cold, Cold Heart
- Come Dance with Me
- Come Fly with Me
- Come Rain or Come Shine
- Come Sunday
- Comes Love
- Con Alma
- Conception
- Confessin'
- Confirmation
- The Continental
- Copenhagen
- Coquette
- Corcovado (Quiet Nights of Quiet Stars)
- Corner Pocket
- A Cottage for Sale
- Cotton Tail
- Countdown
- Crazy He Calls Me
- Crazy Rhythm
- Creole Love Call
- Cry Me a River
- Crystal Silence

== D ==
- Daahoud
- Dancing in the Dark
- Dancing on the Ceiling
- Danny Boy
- Dark Eyes
- Darktown Strutters' Ball
- Darn That Dream
- Davenport Blues
- Day by Day
- Day Dream
- Day In, Day Out
- Days of Wine and Roses
- Dear Heart
- Dear Old Southland
- Dear Old Stockholm
- 'Deed I Do
- Deep in a Dream
- Deep Night
- Deep Purple
- Deep River
- Desafinado
- Detour Ahead
- Devil May Care
- Dexterity
- Diamonds Are a Girl's Best Friend
- Dinah
- Dindi
- Ding-Dong! The Witch Is Dead
- Dipper Mouth Blues
- Dixieland
- Dizzy Atmosphere
- Dizzy's Business
- Django
- Do I Love You?
- Do It Again
- Do Nothin' Till You Hear from Me
- Do You Know What It Means to Miss New Orleans
- Doctor, Lawyer, Indian Chief
- Doggin' Around
- Dolphin Dance
- Donna Lee
- Don't Blame Me
- Don't Bring Lulu
- Don't Explain
- Don't Fence Me In
- Don't Get Around Much Anymore
- Don't Go to Strangers
- Don't Take Your Love from Me
- Don't Worry 'Bout Me
- Doodlin'
- Down by the Riverside
- Down in the Depths (On the Ninetieth Floor)
- Down with Love (song)
- Doxy
- Dream
- Dream a Little Dream of Me
- Dream Dancing
- Dreamsville
- Drifting on a Reed
- Drop Me Off in Harlem
- Drum Boogie
- Duke's Place (see C Jam Blues)

== E ==
- Early Autumn
- East of the Sun (and West of the Moon)
- Easter Parade
- Easy Living
- Easy to Love (short for You'd Be So Easy to Love
- Echoes of Harlem
- Elmer's Tune
- Embraceable You
- Emily
- Epistrophy
- Equipoise
- Equinox
- E.S.P
- Estate
- Every Day I Have the Blues
- Everybody Loves My Baby
- Everything but You
- Everything Happens to Me
- Everything I Have Is Yours
- Evidence
- Ev'ry Time We Say Goodbye
- Exactly Like You
- Exodus

== F ==
- Falling in Love with Love
- Farewell Blues
- Fascinating Rhythm
- Fat Girl
- Feeling Good
- A Felicidade
- Fever
- Fidgety Feet
- Fine and Dandy
- Fine and Mellow
- A Fine Romance
- Fire Waltz
- Five Foot Two, Eyes of Blue (a.k.a. Has Anybody Seen My Gal?)
- Flamingo
- The Flat Foot Floogie
- A Flower Is a Lovesome Thing
- Fly Me to the Moon
- Flying Home
- A Foggy Day (In London Town)
- The Folks Who Live on the Hill
- Fools Rush In (Where Angels Fear to Tread)
- Footprints
- For All We Know
- For Once in My Life
- (I Love You) For Sentimental Reasons
- For You
- Forest Flower
- Four
- Four Brothers
- Frankie and Johnny
- Freddie Freeloader
- Freedom Jazz Dance
- Frenesí
- The Frim-Fram Sauce
- From This Moment On
- Full House

== G ==
- A Gal in Calico
- Gee, Baby, Ain't I Good to You
- The Gentle Rain
- Georgia on My Mind
- Get Happy
- Get Me to the Church on Time
- Get Out of Town
- (Get Your Kicks on) Route 66
- Giant Steps
- The Girl from Ipanema
- The Girl That I Marry
- Girl Talk
- Give Me the Simple Life
- Glad to Be Unhappy
- Gloomy Sunday
- The Glory of Love
- God Bless the Child
- God Rest Ye, Merry Gentlemen
- Goin' Out of My Head
- Golden Lady
- Gone with the Wind
- Good Bait
- Goody Goody
- The Good Life
- Good Morning Heartache
- Goodbye
- Goodbye Pork Pie Hat
- Goodnight My Love
- Grandpa's Spells
- Green Eyes (Aquellos Ojos Verdes)
- Greensleeves
- Groovin' High
- Guilty
- Gut Stomp
- The Gypsy in My Soul

== H ==
- Haitian Fight Song
- Half Nelson
- Hallelujah!
- Hallelujah I Love Her So
- Happiness Is a Thing Called Joe
- Hard Hearted Hannah (The Vamp of Savannah)
- Harlem Nocturne
- Has Anybody Seen My Gal?
- Haunted Heart
- Have You Heard?
- Have You Met Miss Jones?
- Have Yourself a Merry Little Christmas
- Heart and Soul
- Heat Wave
- The Heather on the Hill
- Heaven Watch the Philippines
- Heebie Jeebies
- Hello, Dolly!
- Hello, My Lover, Goodbye
- Hello, Young Lovers
- Here in My Heart
- Here's That Rainy Day
- He's Funny That Way (orig. She's...)
- Hi-Fly
- High Society
- Hit the Road to Dreamland
- Honeysuckle Rose
- Hong Kong Blues
- Hooray for Love
- Hot House
- Hot Toddy
- A House Is Not a Home
- How About Me?
- How About You?
- How Come You Do Me Like You Do?
- How Deep Is the Ocean?
- How Do You Keep the Music Playing?
- How High the Moon
- How Insensitive (orig. Insensatez)
- How Little We Know
- How Long Blues
- How Long Has This Been Going On?
- How My Heart Sings
- Humoresque
- A Hundred Years from Today

== I ==
- I Ain't Got Nobody
- I Ain't Got Nothin' But the Blues
- I Believe in You
- I Can't Believe That You're in Love with Me
- I Can't Escape from You
- I Can't Get Started
- I Can't Give You Anything but Love
- I Can't Stop Loving You
- I Concentrate on You
- I Could Go On Singing
- I Could Have Danced All Night
- I Could Write a Book
- I Cover the Waterfront
- I Cried for You
- I Didn't Know About You
- I Didn't Know What Time It Was
- I Don't Know Why (I Love You Like I Do)
- I Don't Stand a Ghost of a Chance with You
- I Don't Want to Walk Without You
- I Don't Want You to Go
- I Dreamed a Dream
- I Fall in Love Too Easily
- I Found a New Baby
- I Get a Kick Out of You
- I Get Along Without You Very Well
- I Got a Crush on You
- I Got It Bad (and That Ain't Good)
- I Got Lost in His Arms
- I Got Rhythm
- I Gotta Right to Sing the Blues
- I Guess I'll Hang My Tears Out to Dry
- I Guess I'll Have to Change My Plan
- I Hadn't Anyone Till You
- I Happen to Like New York
- I Have Dreamed
- I Hear a Rhapsody
- I Hear Music
- I Left My Heart in San Francisco
- I Let a Song Go Out of My Heart
- I Love Paris
- I Love You
- (I Love You) For Sentimental Reasons
- I Loves You, Porgy
- I Married an Angel
- I Mean You
- I Only Have Eyes for You
- I Remember Clifford
- I Remember You
- I See Your Face Before Me
- I Should Care
- I Surrender Dear
- I Thought About You
- I Wanna Be Loved
- I Want to Be Happy
- I Wish I Could Shimmy Like My Sister Kate
- I Wish I Knew How It Would Feel to Be Free
- I Wish I Were in Love Again
- I Wish You Love
- I Won't Dance
- If I Could Be with You (One Hour Tonight)
- If I Had You
- If I Loved You
- If I Only Had a Brain
- If I Should Lose You
- If I Were a Bell
- If Love Were All
- If My Friends Could See Me Now
- If You Are But a Dream
- If You Could See Me Now
- If You Never Come Home to Me (orig. Inútil Paisagem)
- I'll Be Hard to Handle
- I'll Be Seeing You
- I'll Get By (As Long as I Have You)
- I'll Never Be the Same
- I'll Never Smile Again
- I'll Remember April
- I'll See You Again
- I'll Take Romance
- Ill Wind
- I'm a Fool to Want You
- I'm Beginning to See the Light
- (I'm) Confessin' (that I Love You)
- I'm Coming Virginia
- I'm Getting Sentimental Over You
- I'm Glad There Is You
- I'm Gonna Lock My Heart (And Throw Away the Key)
- I'm in the Mood for Love
- I'm Just a Lucky So-and-So
- I'm Lost
- I'm Old Fashioned
- I'm Putting All My Eggs in One Basket
- I'm Sitting on Top of the World
- I'm Thru with Love
- Imagination
- Impressions
- In a Mellow Tone
- In a Mist
- In a Sentimental Mood
- (In My) Solitude
- In the Arms of Love
- In the Blue of Evening
- In the Cool, Cool, Cool of the Evening
- In the Groove
- In the Mood
- In the Still of the Night
- In the Wee Small Hours of the Morning
- In Walked Bud
- In Your Own Sweet Way
- The Inch Worm
- Inner Urge
- Insensatez
- Interplay
- Inútil Paisagem
- Invitation
- Is You Is or Is You Ain't My Baby
- Isfahan
- Isn't It a Pity?
- Isn't It Romantic?
- Isn't This a Lovely Day?
- Israel
- It All Depends on You
- It Could Happen to You
- It Don't Mean a Thing
- It Had Better Be Tonight (orig. Meglio stasera)
- It Had to Be You
- It Happened in Monterey
- It Might as Well Be Spring
- It Never Entered My Mind
- It Was Written in the Stars
- It's All Right with Me
- It's Been a Long, Long Time
- It's a Big, Wide, Wonderful World
- It's Easy to Remember (And So Hard to Forget)
- It's Magic
- It's Only a Paper Moon
- It's the Talk of the Town
- I've Found a New Baby
- I've Got a Crush on You
- I've Got a Gal in Kalamazoo
- I've Got My Love to Keep Me Warm
- I Gotta Right to Sing the Blues
- I've Got the World on a String
- I've Got You Under My Skin
- I've Grown Accustomed to Her Face

== J ==
- Ja-Da
- J'attendrai
- Jeepers Creepers
- Jersey Bounce
- Jim
- Jingle Bells
- Jitterbug Waltz
- Jive at Five
- Johnny Come Lately
- Jordu
- Jukebox Saturday Night
- Jumpin' at the Woodside
- Jumpin' Jive
- Jump, Jive an' Wail
- Jump Monk
- June in January
- Just a Closer Walk with Thee
- Just a Gigolo
- Just A-Sittin' and A-Rockin'
- Just Friends
- Just in Time
- Just One of Those Things
- Just Squeeze Me (But Please Don't Tease Me)
- Just You, Just Me

== K ==
- Kansas City
- Kansas City Stomp
- Keep Off the Grass
- Killer Joe
- King Porter Stomp
- A Kiss to Build a Dream On
- Ko-Ko
- Kogun

== L ==
- (Oh,) Lady Be Good
- Lady Bird
- The Lady Is a Tramp
- The Lady's in Love with You
- Lady Sings the Blues
- The Lamp Is Low
- Last Night When We Were Young
- The Last Time I Saw Paris
- Laura
- Lazy Bird
- Lazybones
- Lazy River
- Learnin' the Blues
- Lester Leaps In
- Let It Be
- Let It Snow
- Let There Be Love
- Let's Call the Whole Thing Off
- Let's Face the Music and Dance
- Let's Fall in Love
- Let's Get Away from It All
- Let's Have Another Cup of Coffee
- Let's Misbehave
- Let's Take a Walk Around the Block
- Like Someone in Love
- Li'l Darlin'
- Li'l Liza Jane
- Limehouse Blues
- Linus and Lucy
- Litha
- Little Girl Blue
- Little White Lies
- Liza (All the Clouds'll Roll Away)
- Lonely Woman
- Lonesome Road
- Long Ago (and Far Away)
- Lonnie's Lament
- Look for the Silver Lining
- The Look of Love
- Look to the Sky
- Lorelei
- Lost in the Stars
- Louise
- Love Dance
- Love for Sale
- Love Is Here to Stay
- Love Is Just Around the Corner
- Love Is the Sweetest Thing
- Love Letters
- Love Me or Leave Me
- Love Theme from Spartacus
- Love Theme from The Sandpiper
- Love Walked In
- Loveless Love
- Lover
- Lover, Come Back to Me
- Lover Man (Oh, Where Can You Be?)
- Luck Be a Lady
- Lujon
- Lullaby of Birdland
- Lullaby of the Leaves
- Lulu's Back in Town
- Lush Life
- Lydia the Tattooed Lady

== M ==
- Mack the Knife
- Maiden Voyage
- Main Stem
- Magic Moments
- Make Believe
- Make Someone Happy
- Makin' Whoopee
- A Man and a Woman
- The Man I Love
- The Man That Got Away
- Manhã de Carnaval
- Manhattan
- El Manisero (a.k.a. The Peanut Vendor)
- Manteca
- Maple Leaf Rag
- Margie
- Maria
- Marie
- Mas Que Nada
- Maybe
- Maybe You'll Be There
- Mean to Me
- The Meaning of the Blues
- Meditation
- Me and My Shadow
- Meet The Flintstones
- Meglio stasera
- Memories of Tomorrow
- Memories of You
- The Memphis Blues
- Mercy, Mercy, Mercy
- Michelle
- Midnight Sun
- Midnight Symphony
- Milestones
- Minnie the Moocher
- Minority
- Minor Swing
- Miss Ann
- Miss Brown to You
- Mississippi Mud
- Misterioso
- Misty
- Moanin'
- Moanin' Low
- Moments Like This
- Moment's Notice
- Mon Homme
- Mona Lisa
- Monk's Dream
- The Mooche
- Mood Indigo
- Moody's Mood for Love
- Moonburn
- Moon Dreams
- Moon River
- Moon Song (That Wasn't Meant for Me)
- Moondance
- Moonglow
- Moonlight Becomes You
- Moonlight in Vermont
- Moonlight Serenade
- Moose the Mooche
- More
- The More I See You
- More Than You Know
- Die Moritat von Mackie Messer (a.k.a. Mack the Knife)
- Morning
- Morning Dance
- The Most Beautiful Girl in the World
- Moten Swing
- Motherless Child
- Mountain Greenery
- Move
- Mr. Bojangles
- Mr. P.C.
- Muskrat Ramble
- My Baby Just Cares for Me
- My Blue Heaven
- My Buddy
- My Darling, My Darling
- My Favorite Things
- My Foolish Heart
- My Funny Valentine
- My Heart Belongs to Daddy
- My Heart Stood Still
- My Mammy
- My Man (orig. Mon Homme)
- My Man's Gone Now
- My Melancholy Baby
- My Old Flame
- My One and Only Love
- My Reverie
- My Resistance Is Low
- My Romance
- My Shining Hour
- My Ship
- My Way
- Mysterious Traveller

== N ==
- Nagasaki
- Naima
- Nancy (With the Laughing Face)
- Nardis
- Nature Boy
- Near You
- Nefertiti
- The Nearness of You
- Nem Um Talvez
- Never My Love
- Never Will I Marry
- Nevertheless (I'm in Love with You)
- New Orleans
- Nica's Dream
- Nice 'n' Easy
- Nice Work If You Can Get It
- Night and Day
- The Night Has a Thousand Eyes
- A Night in Tunisia
- Night Train
- A Nightingale Sang in Berkeley Square
- No Other Love
- No Moon at All
- No More Blues (orig. Chega de Saudade)
- Nobody Else But Me
- Nobody Knows You When You're Down and Out
- Nobody's Sweetheart Now
- Nostalgia in Times Square
- Now It Can Be Told
- Now's the Time
- Nuages

== O ==
- O Christmas Tree
- An Occasional Man
- Of Thee I Sing
- Oh, Lady Be Good!
- Oh, You Crazy Moon
- Ol' Man River
- Old Devil Moon
- Old Folks
- Old Folks at Home
- Ole Buttermilk Sky
- Oleo
- On a Clear Day (You Can See Forever)
- On a Slow Boat to China
- On Green Dolphin Street
- On the Alamo
- On the Street Where You Live
- On the Sunny Side of the Street
- Once I Loved
- Once in a While
- One Morning in May
- One Note Samba (Samba de uma Nota Só)
- One O'Clock Jump
- Only Trust Your Heart
- Oop Bop Sh'Bam
- Opus de Funk
- Orange Colored Sky
- Organ Grinder's Swing
- Ornithology
- Our Delight
- (Our) Love Is Here to Stay
- Out of Nowhere
- Out of This World
- Over the Rainbow

== P ==
- Panama
- Pannonica
- Papa Loves Mambo
- Paper Doll
- A Paper Moon
- Parisian Thoroughfare
- Parker's Mood
- The Party's Over
- Passion Dance
- Peace
- Peace Piece
- The Peacocks
- The Peanut Vendor
- Peel Me a Grape
- Peg O' My Heart
- Pennies from Heaven
- Pennsylvania 6-5000
- A Penny for Your Thoughts
- Pensativa
- Pent-Up House
- Penthouse Serenade
- People
- People Will Say We're in Love
- Perdido
- Perfidia
- Peter Gunn
- Petite Fleur
- Pick Yourself Up
- Pinetop's Boogie Woogie
- The Pink Panther Theme
- Please Be Kind
- (Please) Do It Again
- Please Don't Talk About Me When I'm Gone
- Please Send Me Someone to Love
- Poinciana
- Polka Dots and Moonbeams
- Ponta de Areia
- Poor Butterfly
- Potato Head Blues
- The Preacher
- Prelude to a Kiss
- Prisoner of Love
- P.S. I Love You
- Put Your Dreams Away (For Another Day)
- Puttin' On the Ritz

== Q ==
- Que reste-t-il de nos amours ?
- Que Sera, Sera (Whatever Will Be, Will Be)
- Quicksilver (Bing Crosby song)
- Quicksilver (Horace Silver composition)
- ¿Quién será? (a.k.a. Sway)
- Quiet Nights of Quiet Stars (orig. Corcovado)
- Quiet Now
- Quizás, Quizás, Quizás

== R ==
- Recorda Me
- Red Sails in the Sunset
- Reflections
- Reincarnation of a Lovebird
- Relaxin' at Camarillo
- Remember
- Rhythm-A-Ning
- Ridin’ High
- River Man
- Riverboat Shuffle
- Road Song
- Rock-a-Bye Your Baby with a Dixie Melody
- Rockin' Chair
- Rockin' in Rhythm
- Rocks in My Bed
- Rose Room
- 'Round Midnight
- Route 66
- Royal Garden Blues
- Ruby
- Ruby, My Dear
- Rudolph the Red-Nosed Reindeer
- Runnin' Wild
- Russian Lullaby

== S ==
- The Saga of Harrison Crabfeathers
- Saint Louis Blues
- Salt Peanuts
- Samba de Uma Nota Só (a.k.a. One Note Samba)
- Santa Claus Is Coming to Town
- Satin Doll
- Saturday Night (Is the Loneliest Night of the Week)
- Say It Isn't So
- Say It with Music
- Scotch and Soda
- Scrapple from the Apple
- The Second Time Around
- Secret Love
- See See Rider (a.k.a. C.C. Rider)
- Send a Little Love My Way
- Send in the Clowns
- Señor Blues
- Sentimental Journey
- Sentimental Me
- September in the Rain
- The September of My Years
- September Song
- Serenade in Blue
- Serenata
- Seven Steps to Heaven
- The Shadow of Your Smile
- Shanghai Shuffle
- The Sheik of Araby
- She Didn't Say Yes
- She's Funny That Way
- Shine
- Shine on Harvest Moon
- Shiny Stockings
- A Ship Without a Sail
- Shoo-Fly Pie and Apple Pan Dowdy
- The Sidewinder
- Signing Off
- Silent Night
- Since I Fell for You
- Sing for Your Supper
- Sing My Heart
- Sing, Sing, Sing (With a Swing)
- Sing, You Sinners
- Singin' in the Rain
- Sister Sadie
- Skylark
- Sleep Warm
- A Sleepin' Bee
- Sleepy Time Down South
- Smile
- Smoke Gets in Your Eyes
- Snake Rag
- Snuggled on Your Shoulder (Cuddled in Your Arms)
- So Nice (a.k.a. Summer Samba)
- So Rare
- So What
- Soft Lights and Sweet Music
- Soft Winds
- Softly, as I Leave You
- Softly, as in a Morning Sunrise
- Solar
- Solitude
- Some of These Days
- Some Other Spring
- Some Skunk Funk
- Somebody Loves Me
- Somebody Loves You
- Somebody Stole My Gal
- Someday My Prince Will Come
- Someday Sweetheart
- Someday (You'll Want Me to Want You)
- Someone to Light Up My Life
- Someone to Watch Over Me
- Something Cool
- Something to Live For
- Sometimes I Feel Like a Motherless Child
- Sometimes I'm Happy (Sometimes I'm Blue)
- Somewhere Along the Way
- Somewhere Over the Rainbow
- Song for My Father
- A Song for You
- The Song Is Ended
- The Song Is You
- Song of India
- Song of the Tree
- Sonny Boy
- Soon
- Sophisticated Lady
- The Sorcerer
- Soul Eyes
- South
- Spain
- Speak Low
- The Sphinx
- Spring Can Really Hang You Up the Most
- Spring Is Here
- Spring Will Be a Little Late This Year
- Squeeze Me
- St. James Infirmary Blues
- St. Thomas
- Stablemates
- Stairway to the Stars
- Star Eyes
- Stardust
- Stars Fell on Alabama
- Stella by Starlight
- Steppin' Out with My Baby
- Stolen Moments
- Stompin' at the Savoy
- Stormy Monday Blues
- Stormy Weather
- Straight, No Chaser
- Straighten Up and Fly Right
- Strange Fruit
- Stranger in Paradise
- Strangers in the Night
- Street of Dreams
- Strike Up the Band
- A String of Pearls
- Strollin'
- (Darktown) Strutters' Ball
- Struttin' with Some Barbecue
- Sugar
- Sugar Blues
- The Summer Knows
- Summertime
- Summer Wind
- Sunday
- A Sunday Kind of Love
- Sunny
- Superstition
- Surfboard
- The Surrey with the Fringe on Top
- Swanee River
- Sway
- Swedish Pastry
- Sweet and Lovely
- Sweet Georgia Brown
- Sweet Lorraine
- Sweet Sue, Just You
- Sweethearts on Parade
- Swing 42
- Swing Low, Sweet Chariot
- Swinging on a Star
- Swingmatism
- 'S Wonderful

== T ==
- 'Tain't Nobody's Biz-ness If I Do
- Take Five
- Take the "A" Train
- Taking a Chance on Love
- Tangerine
- Tar Paper Stomp
- A Taste of Honey
- Tea for Two
- Teach Me Tonight
- Ten Cents a Dance
- Tenderly
- Tenor Madness
- Thank Heaven for Little Girls
- Thanks for the Memory
- That Old Black Magic
- That Old Feeling
- That's a Plenty
- That's All
- That's Amore
- That's Life
- That's Why They Call Me Shine
- Them There Eyes
- There Is No Greater Love
- There! I've Said It Again
- There Must Be Somebody Else
- There Will Never Be Another You
- There'll Be Some Changes Made
- There's a Lull in My Life
- There's a Small Hotel
- There's No Such Thing As Love
- There's No You
- These Foolish Things (Remind Me of You)
- They All Laughed
- They Can't Take That Away from Me
- They Didn't Believe Me
- (They Long to Be) Close to You
- They Say
- They Say It's Wonderful
- Things Ain't What They Used to Be
- The Things We Did Last Summer
- This Can't Be Love
- This Could Be The Start Of Something Big
- This I Dig Of You
- This Is All I Ask
- This Love of Mine
- This Masquerade
- This Time the Dream's on Me
- Thou Swell
- Three Coins in the Fountain
- Three Flowers
- Three Little Words
- Tico Tico
- Tiger Rag
- Till There Was You
- Time After Time
- Time on My Hands
- Time Remembered
- Tin Roof Blues
- Tin Tin Deo
- 'Tis Autumn
- To Each His Own
- To Keep My Love Alive
- To Love Somebody
- Tones for Joan's Bones
- Too Close for Comfort
- Too Darn Hot
- Too Good to Be True
- Too Marvelous for Words
- Topsy
- The Touch of Your Lips
- Triste
- The Trolley Song
- Try a Little Tenderness
- Tune Up
- Turn Out the Stars
- Tuxedo Junction
- The Two Lonely People
- Two Sleepy People

== U ==
- La última noche
- Undecided
- Under a Blanket of Blue
- Unsquare Dance
- Until the Real Thing Comes Along
- (Up a) Lazy River
- Useless Landscape (orig. Inútil Paisagem)

== V ==
- Vaya con Dios
- The Very Thought of You
- La Vie en rose
- Violets for Your Furs
- Viper's Drag
- Vou Te Contar (a.k.a. Wave)
- Volare

== W ==
- Wabash Blues
- Wait till You See Her
- Walkin' Shoes
- Walk On By
- Waltz for Debby
- Washboard Blues
- Watch What Happens
- Watermelon Man
- Waters of March (orig. Águas de Março)
- Wave (a.k.a. Vou Te Contar)
- Way Down Yonder in New Orleans
- The Way You Look Tonight
- Weary Blues
- Weed Smoker's Dream (a.k.a. Why Don't You Do Right?)
- We'll Be Together Again
- We'll Meet Again
- Well, You Needn't
- West Coast Blues
- West End Blues
- What a Diff'rence a Day Made
- What a Little Moonlight Can Do
- What a Wonderful World
- What Are You Doing the Rest of Your Life?
- What Can I Say After I Say I'm Sorry?
- What Is There to Say?
- What Is This Thing Called Love?
- What Kind of Fool Am I?
- What the World Needs Now Is Love
- What Now My Love
- Whatever Lola Wants
- What'll I Do
- What's New?
- When I Fall in Love
- When It's Sleepy Time Down South
- When My Sugar Walks Down the Street
- When Sunny Gets Blue
- When the Saints Go Marching In
- When the Sun Comes Out
- When You Wish Upon a Star
- When Your Lover Has Gone
- When You're Smiling
- Where Are You?
- Where or When
- Whiplash
- Whispering
- Whisper Not
- Whistle While You Work
- Who Can I Turn To?
- Who’s Sorry Now?
- Why Can't You Behave?
- Why Don't You Do Right?
- Why Was I Born?
- Wild Women Don't Have the Blues
- Willow Weep for Me
- Windows
- Witchcraft
- Without a Song
- Wives and Lovers
- Wolverine Blues
- Won't You Come Home Bill Bailey
- Woodchopper's Ball
- The Woodpecker Song
- Woody 'n' You
- Work Song
- The World Is Waiting for the Sunrise
- Wrap Your Troubles in Dreams

== Y ==
- Yardbird Suite
- Yellow Days
- Yes Sir, That's My Baby
- Yesterdays
- You and the Night and the Music
- You Are Too Beautiful
- You Belong to Me
- You Brought a New Kind of Love to Me
- You Can Depend on Me
- You Couldn't Be Cuter
- You Don't Know What Love Is
- You Go to My Head
- You Make Me Feel So Young
- You Must Have Been a Beautiful Baby
- You Send Me
- You Stepped Out of a Dream
- You Took Advantage of Me
- You Won't Be Satisfied (Until You Break My Heart)
- You'd Be So Easy to Love
- You'd Be So Nice to Come Home To
- Young and Foolish
- Young at Heart
- You're Driving Me Crazy
- You're Getting to Be a Habit with Me
- You're Just in Love
- You're My Everything
- You're My Thrill
- You're Nobody till Somebody Loves You
- You're the Cream in My Coffee
- You're the Top
- You've Changed
- You've Got What Gets Me

== Z ==
- Zing! Went the Strings of My Heart
- Zip-a-Dee-Doo-Dah
