= Best Wishes =

Best Wishes may refer to

- A greeting

== Literature ==
- Best Wishes, a children's book series by Sarah Mlynowski

== Film and television ==
- Best Wishes for Tomorrow, a 2007 Japanese film by director Takashi Koizumi
- "Best Wishes", an episode of the American television program Ed
- Pocket Monsters: Best Wishes!, the Japanese title of the animated TV series Pokémon the Series: Black & White
- "Best Wishes", a season 18 episode of Arthur

== Music ==
=== Albums ===
- Best Wishes (Cro-Mags album), 1989
- Best Wishes: Live at the Labirinti Sonori Festival 2001, Steve Lacy, 2001
- Best Wishes, Jad Fair, 1987

=== Songs ===
- "Best Wishes" (Duke Ellington song), 1932
- "Best Wishes", by Fairport Convention on Sense of Occasion, 2007
- "Best Wishes", a single by Alternative TV, 1991
- "Best Wishes", single by Ronnie Sundin and Daphne Walker, 1960
