= Cherry (jazz standard) =

1928 jazz standard composed by Don Redman

"Cherry" is a 1928 jazz standard. It was composed by Don Redman, with lyrics written by Redman and Ray Gilbert.

== Recordings ==
Harry James recorded a version in 1942 (released in 1943) on Columbia 36683 that peaked at #4 on the U.S. chart and at #10 on the Harlem Hit Parade.

== See also ==
- List of jazz standards
