= Maceo Pinkard =

American songwriter

Maceo Pinkard (June 27, 1897 – July 21, 1962) was an American composer, lyricist, and music publisher. Among his compositions is "Sweet Georgia Brown", a popular standard for decades after its composition and famous as the theme of the Harlem Globetrotters basketball team.

Pinkard was inducted in the National Academy of Popular Music Songwriters Hall of Fame in 1984.

== Biography ==
Pinkard was born in Bluefield, West Virginia to Mary Ellen Jimerson, educator, and G. Pinkard, a coal miner. He was educated at the Bluefield Colored Institute, class of 1913, and wrote his first major song ("I'm Goin' Back Home") one year later. He was one of the greatest composers of the Harlem Renaissance. In his early career he formed his own orchestra and toured throughout the US as the conductor. In 1914, at age 17, Pinkard founded the theatrical agency in Omaha, Nebraska and eventually founded Pinkard Publications, a music publishing firm in New York City. In 1917, he formed his own publishing firm, Maceo Pinkard Music, and began selling compositions to national publishing companies such as Frank K. Root in Chicago and Leo Feist in New York. In late 1918, he was hired by the firm of Shapiro, Bernstein & Company in New York and the following year saw the publication of first big hit, "Mammy O'Mine."

1918 saw a flood of music related to the war. Pinkard composed with words and music "Don't Cry Little Girl, Don't Cry." The sentiment in the lyrics is universal for lovers who must part. He also wrote the words and music for Those Draftin' Blues.

In 1919, Pinkard moved to New York City. His best work was written during the decade 1921-1931. Primarily writing as the composer and lyricist, Pinkard's catalog includes such hit songs as "Sugar", "Gimme a Little Kiss, Will Ya Huh?", "At Twilight", "Them There Eyes" (1930), later recorded by Billie Holiday in 1939 on the OKeh label. This was one of the songs Holiday sang at the Storyville jazz club in Boston in 1952. "Sweet Georgia Brown" a number one Billboard hit in the summer of 1925, "Here Comes the Show Boat" (1927), "Sweet Man", "I'll Be a Friend (With Pleasure)", "Congratulations" (1929), "Is That Religion?", "Liza" (1922), "Lila", "There Must Be Somebody Else", "Okay Baby", "That Wonderful Boy Friend of Mine", "Let's Have a Showdown", "My Old Man" and "Mammy O' Mine" (1919).Shortly after his move to New York, he recorded his piano playing on several piano rolls (for the Republic and Connorized companies) which are the only known record of his playing. In 1930, his song "I'll Be A Friend with Pleasure", was recorded by a jazz band led by Bix Beiderbecke, with Gene Krupa and Benny Goodman among the sidemen.

His famous music composition "Sweet Georgia Brown", lyrics by Kenneth Casey, was recorded by artists Louis Armstrong (1928), Count Basie, The Beatles album Ain't She Sweet (1962), Cab Calloway (1931), Ray Charles (1961), Nat King Cole (1943), Bing Crosby (1927), Ella Fitzgerald (1956), Dizzy Gillespie (1967), Benny Goodman (1956), Harry James (1939), Carmen McRae (1964), Thelonious Monk (1941), Charlie Parker (1947), Oscar Peterson (1945), Cole Porter (1960), Sarah Vaughan (1963), and Ethel Waters (1923).

Duke Ellington's introduction to the music industry began with Maceo Pinkard. Shortly after they met at Barron's nightclub, Pinkard took Ellington downtown and introduced him to the music publishing district. This area of Broadway, from 40th to 55th Streets, was known as Tin Pan Alley because of the cacophony of so many pianists playing different pieces of music in different keys. It was there that Ellington had his first meeting at Mills Music with younger brother Irving, who would later become his manager. Ellington recorded some of Pinkard's compositions such as "Is That Religion?", "Sweet Georgia Brown", and "Them There Eyes".

== Stage production ==
=== Liza (1922) ===
Pinkard also wrote and produced the Broadway musical, comedy show Liza (from the book by Irvin C. Miller), which opened November 27, 1922 at Daly's 63rd Street Theatre, New York City. Ran for 172 performances (November 27, 1922 - April 21, 1923). Original Cast included Emmett Anthony, Will A. Cook, Thaddius Drayton, Alonzo Fenderson, Doe Doe Green, R. Eddie Greenlee, Snippy Mason, Irvin C. Miller, Quintard Miller, Billy Mills, Packer Ramsey, Maude Russell, Gertrude Saunders, Margaret Simms, William Simms and Elizabeth Terrill. Lyrics and music by Maceo Pinkard: "Tag Day," "Pleasure," "I'm the Sheriff," "Liza," "Just a Barber Shop Cord," "Just a Barber Shop Cord," "That Brownskin Flapper," "On the Moonlit Swanee," "Essence," "Forget Your Troubles, "(I've Got Those) Runnin' Wild Blues," "Dandy," "My Creole Girl," "Planning," "Love Me," and "Don't Be Blue."

Music popularized on disc by Zez Confrey and His Orchestra (Victor 19055), Albert E. Short's and His Tivoli Syncopators (Vocalion 14554), and the new Synco Jazz Band (Perfect 14104).

Category: Musical, Comedy, Original, Broadway
Description: A musical in two acts
Setting: Summer Time in Jimtown, South Carolina

=== Review ===
The Negro hit of the year, with book by Irving C. Miller and music by Maceo Pinkard, opened at Daly's 63rd Street Theater in November. "The dressing rooms, which were built for Shuffle Along," said Eubie Blake, "were completed just in time for Liza." A few months later Liza moved to the Nora Bayes Theater on 44th Street, and became the first Negro show to play Broadway proper during the regular season. (Only the summer months had been available for Negro productions heretofore, while the critics wondered why the shows were presented at such a hot time of the year.) Liza ran for 172 performances at a time when a run of one hundred was considered good.

Maceo Pinkard died in New York City on July 19, 1962. Each year, Bluefield State University holds a weeklong festival in honor of its famous alumnus.

In 1999, the Grammy-nominated album The Love Movement by A Tribe Called Quest included a sample of the 1920 Maceo Pinkard composition "Start It Up."

== Film scores ==
Pinkard's compositions as a film score were used in a number of movies, which were compiled from previously written musical compositions. Partial list includes:

Year	Film	Actor/Actress	Songs
1929	Show Boat	Laura La Plante; Joseph Schildkraut	"Here Comes the Show Boat" (1929)
1930	The Widow from Chicago	Edward G. Robinson	"Sweet Georgia Brown"
1939	Invisible Stripes	Humphrey Bogart; George Raft; William Holden	"Sweet Georgia Brown"
1940	Second Chorus	Fred Astaire	"Sweet Georgia Brown"
1950	Young Man with a Horn	Kirk Douglas; Lauren Bacall; Louis Armstrong	"Sweet Georgia Brown"
1952	Has Anybody Seen My Gal?	Rock Hudson; Piper Laurie	"Gimme a little kiss, will ya, huh?" (1926)
1955	Pete Kelly's Blues	Jack Webb; Peggy Lee; Ella Fitzgerald; Jayne Mansfield	"Sugar"
1959	Some Like It Hot	Marilyn Monroe; Tony Curtis; Jack Lemmon	"Sweet Georgia Brown"
1991	The Fabulous Baker Boys	Jeff Bridges; Michelle Pfeiffer	"Sweet Georgia Brown"
1991	Oscar	Sylvester Stallone	"Sweet Georgia Brown"
1992	The Babe	John Goodman; Kelly McGillis	"Sweet Georgia Brown"
1993	The Meteor Man	Robert Townsend; James Earl Jones; Bill Cosby; Nancy Wilson	"Them There Eyes" (1930)
1999	Sweet and Lowdown	Sean Penn; Samantha Morton; Uma Thurman	"Sweet Georgia Brown"
2005	Rebound	Martin Lawrence; Wendy Raquel Robinson	"Sweet Georgia Brown" (1925)
2005	Capote	Philip Seymour Hoffman	"Sugar (That Sugar Baby o' Mine)"
