= Big Foot (Charlie Parker composition) =

"Big Foot" or "Drifting on a Reed" is a 1948 jazz standard. It was written by Charlie Parker.

== See also ==
- List of jazz standards
