= Blue Lou =

1933 jazz standard

"Blue Lou" is a 1933 jazz standard. It was written by Edgar Sampson and copyrighted in 1935 with the help of the publishing company of Irving Mills.

The first recording was made by Benny Carter and his Orchestra on October 16. 1933. Followed by Chick Webb in 1934 and Fletcher Henderson in 1936. It makes strong use of the half-diminished chord, described by some musicologists as "the" bebop chord. Charlie Shavers recorded a version of the standard in 1944 accompanied by Milt Hinton and J. C. Heard.

== See also ==
- List of jazz standards
