= Mayorga, Leyte =

Municipality in Leyte, Philippines

Mayorga
- Municipality
- Municipality of Mayorga
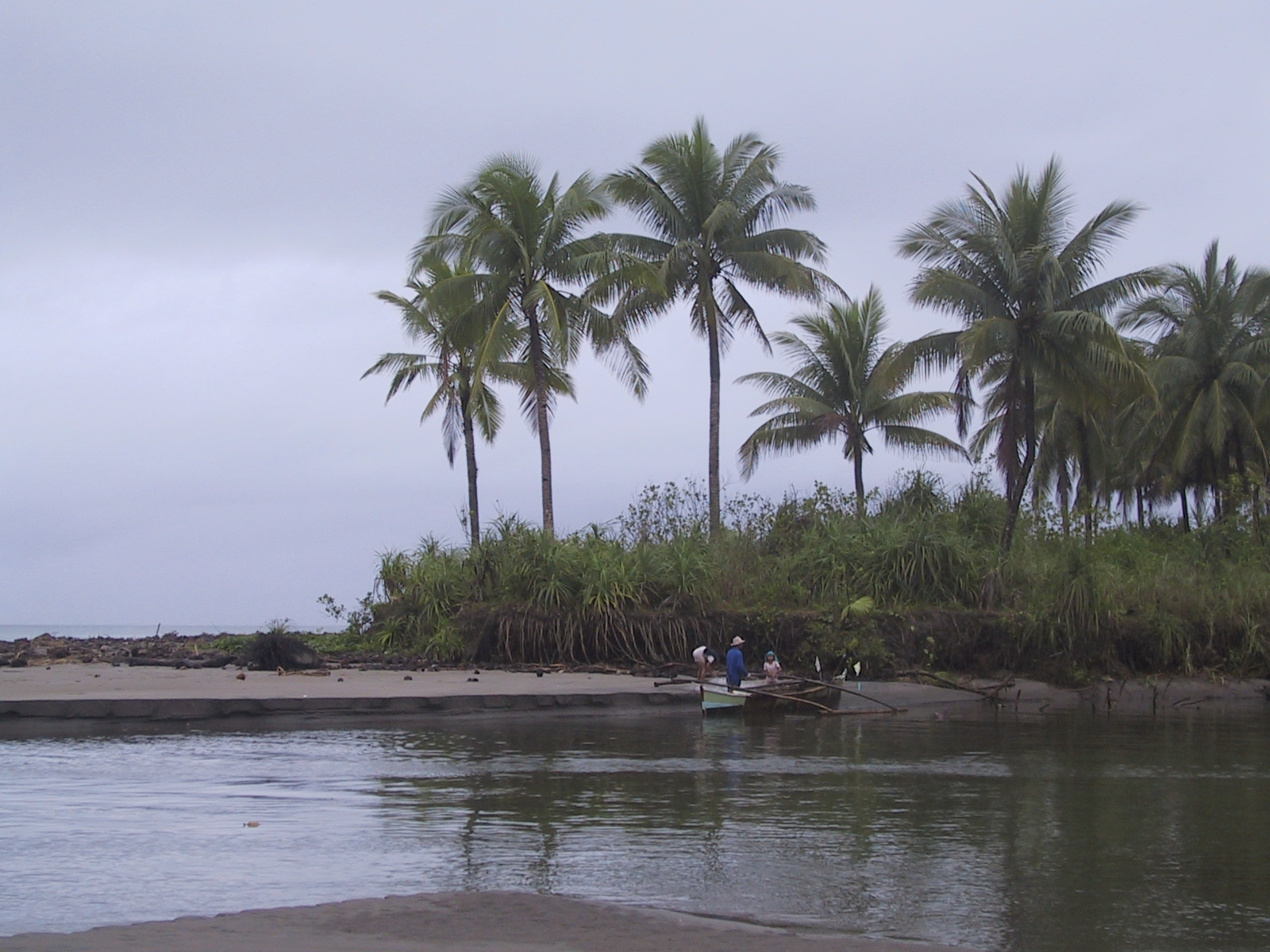
- Riverside in Mayorga

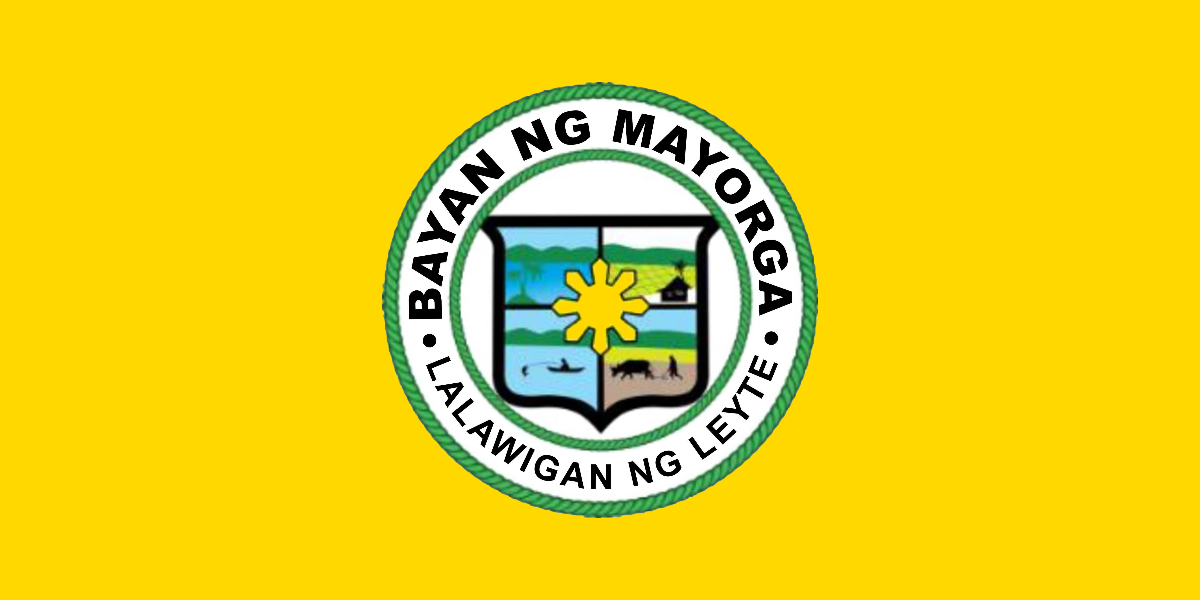
- Flag

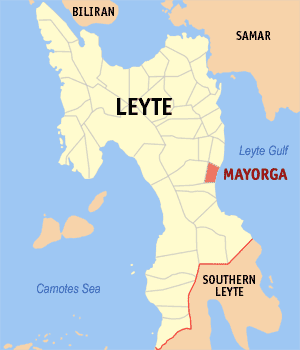
- Map of Leyte with Mayorga highlighted
- Interactive map of Mayorga
- Location within the Philippines
- Coordinates: 10°54′11″N 125°00′22″E
- Country: Philippines
- Region: Eastern Visayas
- Province: Leyte
- District: 2nd district
- Founded: May 11, 1955
- Barangays: 16 (see Barangays)

Government
  - Type: Sangguniang Bayan
  - Mayor: Alexander S. De Paz
  - Vice Mayor: Sergio I. Zabala
  - Representative: Lolita T. Javier
  - Councilors: List: • Jairo C. Beltran; • Marciano Alicando; • Mark Cloyd M. Tan-Piengco; • Ronnie Bogs Saballa; • Crisanto C. Cabaobao Jr.; • Joseph A. Amante; • Henry B. Lagarto; • Israel Lumpas; DILG Masterlist of Officials
  - Electorate: 14,199 voters (2025)

Area
  - Total: 42.17 km^{2} (16.28 sq mi)
- Elevation: 4.0 m (13.1 ft)
- Highest elevation: 213 m (699 ft)
- Lowest elevation: 0 m (0 ft)

Population (2024 census)
  - Total: 18,713
  - Density: 443.8/km^{2} (1,149/sq mi)
  - Households: 4,779

Economy
  - Income class: 4th municipal income class
  - Poverty incidence: 30.76% (2023)
  - Revenue: ₱ 112.3 million (2024)
  - Assets: ₱ 137.9 million (2024)
  - Expenditure: ₱ 104.3 million (2024)
  - Liabilities: ₱ 28.6 million (2024)

Service provider
  - Electricity: Don Orestes Romualdez Electric Coperative (DORELCO)
- Time zone: UTC+8 (PST)
- ZIP code: 6507
- PSGC: 0803735000
- IDD : area code: +63 (0)53
- Native languages: Waray; Tagalog

Mayorga (IPA: [mɐ'jɔɾgɐ]), officially the Municipality of Mayorga (Waray: Bungto han Mayorga; Tagalog: Bayan ng Mayorga), is a municipality in the province of Leyte, Philippines. According to the 2024 census, it has a population of 18,713 people.

== History ==
The town was created in 1954 from the barrios of Mayorga, Andres Bonifacio, Talisay, San Roque, Burgos, Liberty, Union, Ormocay, Wilson, and the southern portion of barrio of Cogon Bingcay which were then a part of Dulag. In 1957, the sitios of Picas, Guintulayan, and Bañgag were converted into barrios and renamed as Santa Cruz, General Antonio Luna, and Calipayan, respectively.

== Geography ==
=== Barangays ===
Mayorga is politically subdivided into 16 barangays. Each barangay consists of puroks and some have sitios.

- A. Bonifacio
- A. Mabini
- Burgos
- Calipayan
- Camansi
- General Antonio Luna
- Liberty
- Ormocay
- Poblacion Zone 1
- Poblacion Zone 2
- Poblacion Zone 3
- San Roque
- Santa Cruz
- Talisay
- Union
- Wilson

=== Climate ===
Climate data for Mayorga, Leyte
Month	Jan	Feb	Mar	Apr	May	Jun	Jul	Aug	Sep	Oct	Nov	Dec	Year
Mean daily maximum °C (°F)	28 (82)	29 (84)	29 (84)	30 (86)	30 (86)	30 (86)	29 (84)	29 (84)	29 (84)	29 (84)	29 (84)	29 (84)	29 (84)
Mean daily minimum °C (°F)	22 (72)	22 (72)	22 (72)	23 (73)	25 (77)	25 (77)	25 (77)	25 (77)	25 (77)	24 (75)	24 (75)	23 (73)	24 (75)
Average precipitation mm (inches)	78 (3.1)	57 (2.2)	84 (3.3)	79 (3.1)	118 (4.6)	181 (7.1)	178 (7.0)	169 (6.7)	172 (6.8)	180 (7.1)	174 (6.9)	128 (5.0)	1,598 (62.9)
Average rainy days	16.7	13.8	17.3	18.5	23.2	26.5	27.1	26.0	26.4	27.5	24.6	21.0	268.6
Source: Meteoblue

== Demographics ==
Population census of Mayorga
Year	Pop.	±% p.a.
1960	8,386	—
1970	8,729	+0.40%
1975	8,378	−0.82%
1980	9,750	+3.08%
1990	10,530	+0.77%
1995	11,073	+0.95%
2000	12,650	+2.90%
2007	13,807	+1.21%
2010	14,694	+2.29%
2015	17,161	+3.00%
2020	18,071	+1.09%
2024	18,713	+0.84%
Source: Philippine Statistics Authority

In the 2024 census, the population of Mayorga was 18,713 people, with a density of 440 inhabitants per square kilometer or 1,100 inhabitants per square mile.

== Economy ==
Poverty incidence of Mayorga (%)

Source: Philippine Statistics Authority
