= 9:20 Special =

Single by Earle Warren, Jack Palmer, William Engvick
- Released: 1941
- Genre: Jazz
- Length: 2:59
- Songwriter(s): Earle Warren, Jack Palmer and William Engvick

"9:20 Special" is a 1941 jazz standard. It was written by Earle Warren, Jack Palmer and William Engvick.

== Recordings ==
- Count Basie recorded the original (3:13) on April 10, 1941 and it was released on OKeh 6244 in 1941
- Glenn Miller recorded a version (3:14) on Mai 19, 1944 and it was one peace of Broadcast program Nr. 17
- Art Tatum recorded a version (2:29) on October 26, 1945 for Armed Forces Radio and released later on Storyville Live Performances 1934-1956
- Harry James recorded a version in 1945 on Columbia Records
- Woody Herman recorded it in 1956 on "Jackpot" - the Las Vegas Herd Capitol Records
- Oscar Peterson also recorded a version of the song, which was featured on his 1956 album 'Oscar Peterson Plays Count Basie'.

== See also ==
- List of jazz standards
