= Valeriano Abello =

Valeriano Ibañez Abello (1913–2000) was a Filipino civilian who was given the Philippine Legion of Honor for his efforts during World War II to aid the US Navy against the Japanese. He is most remembered today in Boy Scouting literature.

== Battle of Leyte ==
During the United States Navy's assault on Leyte on 18 October 1944, three former Boy Scouts, Valeriano Ibañez Abello, Antero Junia, and Vicente Tistón, mobilised and took action due to the extreme danger to the civilian populations posed by the naval bombardment. Acting as sender, receiver, and paddler respectively, Abello, Junia, and Tistón established communication with ship 467 using signalling (learned in youth as Scouts of Troop 11), identified themselves "Boy Scouts of America," pushed out by bangkâ (outrigger canoe), got capsized by Japanese fire, swam to the ship, and were taken aboard. They provided information pinpointing Japanese installations and diverting shelling away from populated areas of Tolosa, Leyte. Their intrepid actions made good copy for war correspondents on board ship. For their heroism, Abello was conferred the Philippine Legion of Honor by Pres. Ramón Magsaysáy in 1956, a statue representing Abello was erected in Telegrafó, and Signal Day would be observed annually on 18 October.

An attempt by relatives to have Abello buried at the Libingan ng mga Bayani failed.

== Discrepancy ==
Sources are inconsistent about Abello's companions. They are named:

- "Antero Junia, Vicente Pomanes" in Boys' Life, Vol. XXXV, No. 7, July 1945, p 26;
- "Anterio Junua and Vicente Cononigo" in Saunders, The Left Handshake, 1949, p 81;
- "Antero Junia and Vicente Canonigo" in Philippine Scouting, May–June 1953;
- "Antero Junia and Vicente Teston" in BSP Diamond Jubilee Yearbook, 1996, p 148;
- "Antero Junio and Vicente Teston" in On My Honor, BSP, 2001, p 104;
- "Antero Junia Sr. and Vicente Tiston" in Philippine News Agency, 18 Oct 2008 and Philippine News Agency, 17 Oct 2010;
- "Antero Junia Sr. and Vicente Tiston" in InterAksyon, 20 Oct 2013;
- "Antero Zunia and Vicente Tiston" in Manila Bulletin, 10 Nov 2013;
- "Antero Zunia and Vicente Tiston" in FAQ.ph, 16 Oct 2014;
- "Antero Zunia and Vicente Tiston" in Choose Philippines, 26 Nov 2014;

Most plausible, perhaps, are the comments of OpinYon publisher Ray L. Junia made in a speech during the commemoration of Signal Day at Telegrafo, Tolosa, Leyte, on October 18, 2015:

Today, we celebrate the heroism of these three Scouts on the morning of October 18, 1944. One of them was my uncle, Antero "Tatay Terong" Junia. The two others were Valeriano Abello (Man Yayong) and Vicente Tiston. ...

As told us by our elders, the three saw the need to guide the American shelling to Japanese encampments, as Filipinos were being killed from indiscriminate targets of American cannons.

Tatay Terong, who organized the signal effort first looked for my father, a sea scout. Unable to find my father, Tatay Terong sought Man Yayong, who knew semaphore signaling. Theirs was a team of sender and reader and a good "banker." ...

Tiston provided support to the two, more so that they had to sail to the American warships to direct the shelling. They were spotted by the Japanese forces and were attacked with cannon fire. Midway to the warships, a Japanese shell found its mark, capsizing their banca. The three had to swim to the warships.

...in ending, let me remind our keepers of record and storytellers, accuracy should not be sacrificed for drama, or worse, for partisan politics. The monument that reminds scouts of the heroism of these three is most inaccurate if not a comedy of errors.

In that monument by the beach, that Man Yayong stands alone and the two others are forgotten, is a distortion of history at best, and a deliberate dishonesty at worst.

That Man Yayong is wearing a scout uniform of current vintage is a comedy of errors.
