= Cheryl (composition) =

1947 jazz composition by Charlie Parker

"Cheryl" is a 1947 jazz standard written by Charlie Parker, and recorded by him for Savoy Records in 1947.

== Notable covers ==
- Kenny Clarke and His 52nd Street Boys in 1948, as A la Colette (first released recording)

== See also ==
- List of jazz standards
