= Aunt Hagar's Blues =

1920 blues song by W. C. Handy and J Tim Brymn

"Aunt Hagar's Blues", variously known as "Aunt Hagar's Children" or "Aunt Hagar's Children's Blues", is a 1920 blues song which has since become a jazz standard. It was written by W. C. Handy and J Tim Brymn.

Critic Martin Williams wrote that pianist Art Tatum's 1949 recording of the piece for Capitol Records "seems so perfect in its overall pattern and pacing, with every short run and every ornament appropriate and in place, that it may be the masterpiece of all his recorded work."

== See also ==
- List of jazz standards
