= Ball of Fire =

1941 film by Howard Hawks

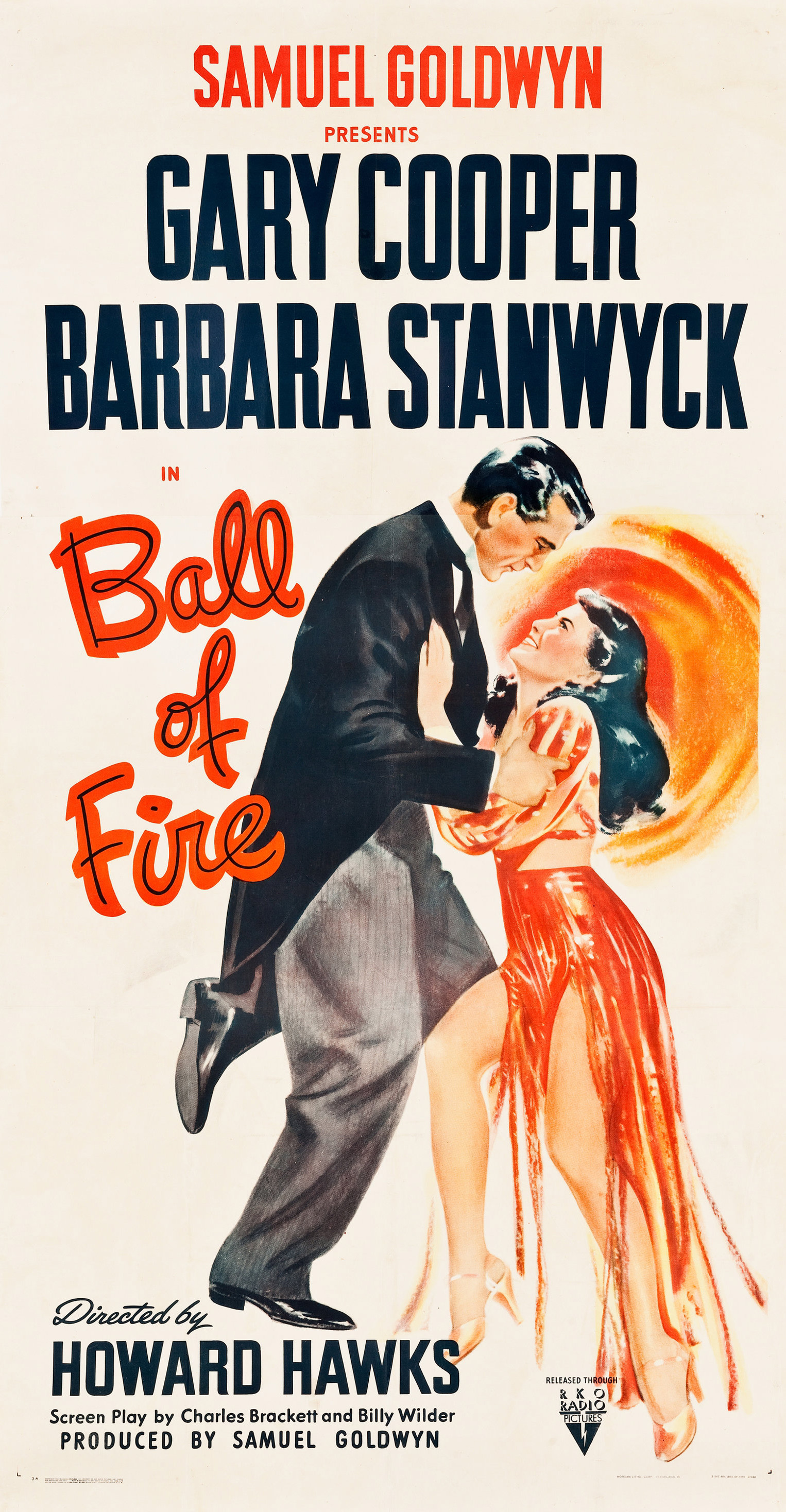
- Theatrical release poster
- Directed by: Howard Hawks
- Screenplay by: Charles Brackett; Billy Wilder
- Based on: From A to Z by Thomas Monroe and Billy Wilder
- Produced by: Samuel Goldwyn
- Starring: Gary Cooper; Barbara Stanwyck
- Cinematography: Gregg Toland
- Edited by: Daniel Mandell
- Music by: Alfred Newman
- Production company: Samuel Goldwyn Productions
- Distributed by: RKO Radio Pictures
- Release date: December 2, 1941
- Running time: 111 minutes
- Country: United States
- Language: English
- Box office: $2,641,000 (worldwide rentals)

Ball of Fire (also known as The Professor and the Burlesque Queen) is a 1941 American screwball comedy film directed by Howard Hawks and starring Gary Cooper and Barbara Stanwyck. The Samuel Goldwyn Productions film (originally distributed by RKO) concerns a group of professors laboring to write an encyclopedia and their encounter with a nightclub performer who provides her own unique knowledge. The supporting cast includes Oscar Homolka, S. Z. Sakall, Henry Travers, Richard Haydn, Dana Andrews, and Dan Duryea.

In 2016, the film was deemed "culturally, historically, or aesthetically significant" by the United States Library of Congress, and selected for preservation in its National Film Registry. In 1948, Hawks recycled the plot for a musical film, A Song Is Born, this time starring Danny Kaye and Virginia Mayo.

== Plot ==
A group of professors, all bachelors except for one widower, have lived together for some years in a New York City residence, compiling an encyclopedia of all human knowledge. The youngest, Professor Bertram Potts, is a grammarian who is researching modern American slang. The professors are accustomed to working in relative seclusion, at a leisurely pace, with a prim housekeeper, Miss Bragg, keeping watch over them. Their impatient financial backer, Miss Totten, suddenly demands that they finish their work soon. When a slang-using garbage man comes in asking the professors' assistance for a quiz, Bertram realizes he is far behind the latest uses of slangs and ventures out to do some independent research and becomes interested in the slang vocabulary of nightclub performer Katherine "Sugarpuss" O'Shea. She is reluctant to assist him until she suddenly needs a place to hide from the police, who want to question her about her boyfriend, mob boss Joe Lilac. Sugarpuss takes refuge in the house where the professors live and work, despite Bertram's objections and their housekeeper's threat to leave because of her. In the meantime, Joe decides to marry her, but only because as his wife she would not be able to testify against him.

The professors soon become fond of her, and she of them. Sugarpuss teaches them to conga and demonstrates to Bertram the meaning of the phrase "yum yum" (kisses). She becomes attracted to Bertram, who reciprocates by proposing marriage to her. She avoids giving him an answer and agrees to Joe's plan to have the professors drive her to New Jersey to marry him. After a series of misadventures, including a car crash, Sugarpuss realizes that she is in love with Bertram, but is forced to go ahead with her marriage to Joe to save the professors from his henchmen. Bertram, meanwhile, unaware of Sugarpuss's love for him, prepares to resume his research, sadder but wiser, until he discovers her true feelings.

The professors eventually outwit Joe and his henchmen and rescue Sugarpuss. She claims she is not good enough for Bertram, but his application of "yum yum" changes her mind. The other seven professors leave the room to give Bertram and Sugarpuss a moment alone.

== Cast ==
- Gary Cooper as Prof. Bertram Potts
- Barbara Stanwyck as Sugarpuss O'Shea
- Oskar Homolka as Prof. Gurkakoff
- Henry Travers as Prof. Jerome
- S. Z. Sakall as Prof. Magenbruch
- Tully Marshall as Prof. Robinson
- Leonid Kinskey as Prof. Quintana
- Richard Haydn as Prof. Oddly
- Aubrey Mather as Prof. Peagram
- Allen Jenkins as Garbage Man
- Dana Andrews as Joe Lilac
- Dan Duryea as Duke Pastrami (one of Lilac's henchmen)
- Ralph Peters as Asthma Anderson (another henchman)
- Kathleen Howard as Miss Bragg
- Mary Field as Miss Totten
- Charles Lane as Larsen (Miss Totten's assistant)
- Charles Arnt as McNeary (Lilac's lawyer)
- Elisha Cook Jr. as Waiter
- Alan Rhein as "Horseface"
- Eddie Foster as Pinstripe
- Aldrich Bowker as Justice of the Peace
- Addison Richards as District Attorney
- Pat West as Bum
- Kenneth Howell as College Boy
- Tommy Ryan as Newsboy
- Tim Ryan as Motor Cop
- Will Lee as "Benny, the Creep"
- Gene Krupa and his Orchestra

== Music ==
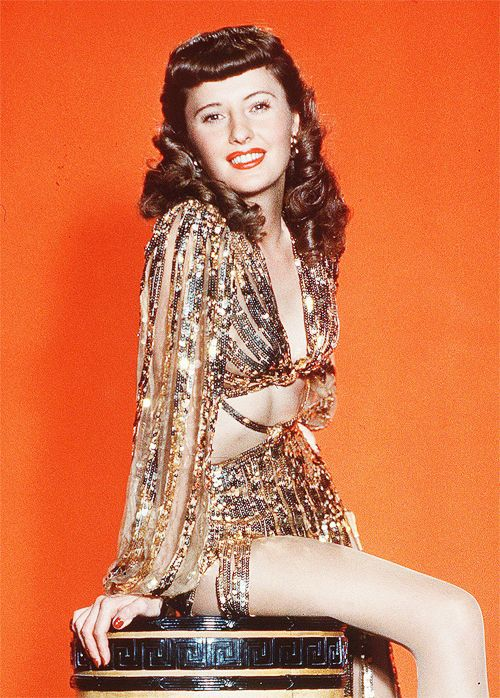
Publicity photo of Barbara Stanwyck for the film

Martha Tilton provided Barbara Stanwyck's singing voice for the song "Drum Boogie". Drummer and bandleader Gene Krupa performed the song onscreen with his band. In an unusual twist, he also played it on a matchbox with matches for drumsticks. Krupa band member and noted trumpeter Roy Eldridge received a brief on-camera spot during "Drum Boogie". At one point, the professors also perform an a cappella version of the 1869 song "Sweet Genevieve"

== Production ==
The script was written by Charles Brackett, Thomas Monroe, and Billy Wilder from a short story titled "From A to Z", which Wilder had created while he was still in Europe. Partly inspired by the fairy tale "Snow White", the professors were loosely based on the dwarfs from Walt Disney's animated film Snow White and the Seven Dwarfs. Although Ball of Fire was directed by the well-established Howard Hawks, Wilder had already decided that he needed to direct his screenplays to protect them from studio and other directors' interference. Hawks was happy to let Wilder study his directing on the set and Wilder thereafter directed his own films. The film was the second feature of 1941 to pair Cooper and Stanwyck, following Meet John Doe.

The role of Sugarpuss was offered to Ginger Rogers and Carole Lombard, but both turned it down. Lucille Ball was almost cast in the role until Gary Cooper recommended Stanwyck.

Wilder reveled in poking fun at those who took politics too seriously. At one point, Sugarpuss points to her sore throat and complains "Slight rosiness? It's as red as the Daily Worker [a left-wing newspaper] and just as sore."

Wilder also worked in a reference to Cooper's Oscar-winning performance in the title role of Hawks's 1941 film Sergeant York by having Dan Duryea's character Duke Pastrami say, "I saw me a movie last week" before licking his thumb and rubbing it on the sight of his gun, a technique Cooper's York uses to improve his marksmanship.

== Reception ==
According to RKO records, Ball of Fire took in $1,856,000 in theater rentals from the United States and Canada and an additional $785,000 from foreign rentals, but, because of the terms of Sam Goldwyn's deal with RKO, RKO recorded a loss of $147,000 on it.

Ball of Fire holds a 100% approval rating on Rotten Tomatoes based on 26 reviews, with a weighted average of 8.3/10. The site's consensus reads: "A splendidly funny twist on the story of Snow White, Ball of Fire boasts a pair of perfect leads in Gary Cooper and Barbara Stanwyck".

== Awards and honors ==
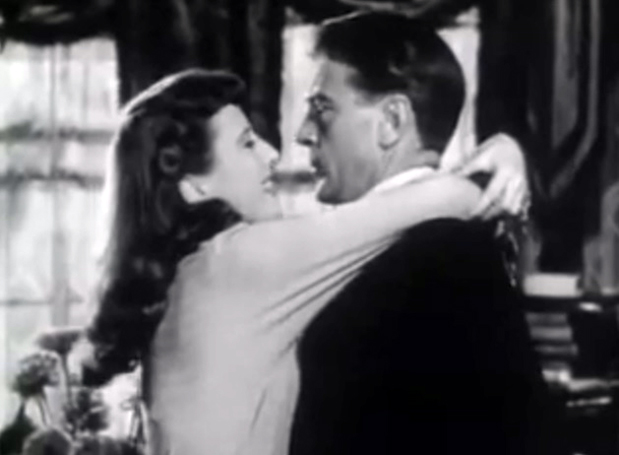
Barbara Stanwyck and Gary Cooper

Ball of Fire was nominated for Academy Awards for Best Actress in a Leading Role (Barbara Stanwyck), Best Music, Scoring of a Dramatic Picture, Best Sound, Recording (Thomas T. Moulton) and Best Story.

In World War II, a total of 12 servicemen were pen-pals with Stanwyck; two of them asked for a poster of her in the Ball of Fire outfit for their mess hall.

Ball of Fire was ranked 92nd in the 2000 American Film Institute (AFI) list AFI's 100 Years...100 Laughs. In a 1999 AFI poll, Gary Cooper and Barbara Stanwyck were both ranked #11 on the male and female lists of the greatest American screen legends.
