= Drifting on a Reed =

"Driftin' on a Reed"

Song by Charlie Parker All-Stars
- Composer(s): Charlie Parker

"Drifting on a Reed" also known as "Big Foot", or "Giant Swing", as well as "Air Conditioning" is a classic Charlie Parker jazz bebop number.

The number was among those played by Los Angeles artists such as Clifford Brown (trumpet), Max Roach (drums) and Harold Land (tenor sax) as part of the "hardening" of Jazz bop. The track is commonly known as "Big Foot" but was first recorded on Dial Records as "Drifting on a Reed."
