= Tolosa, Leyte =

Municipality in Leyte, Philippines

Tolosa
- Municipality
- Municipality of Tolosa
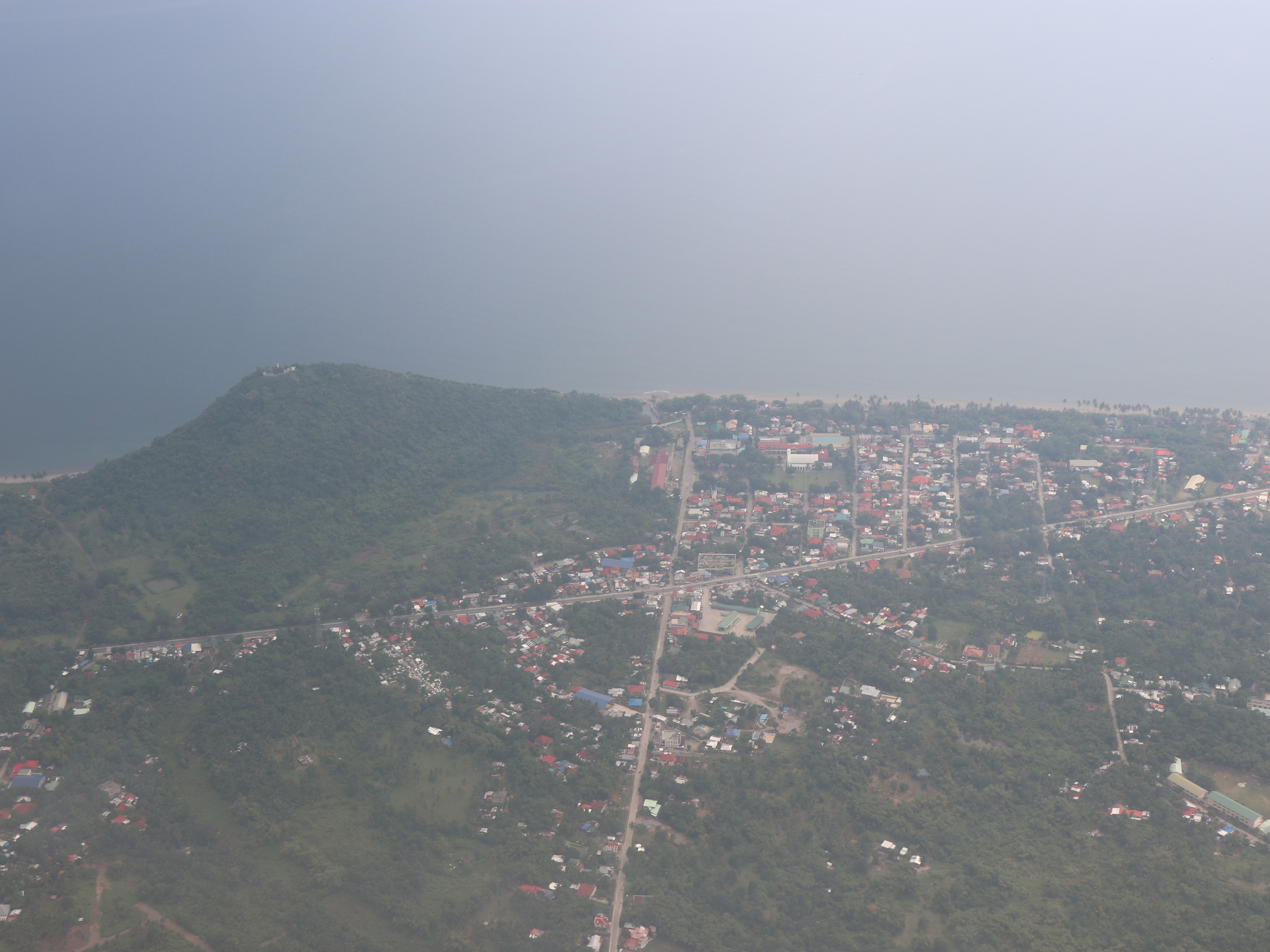

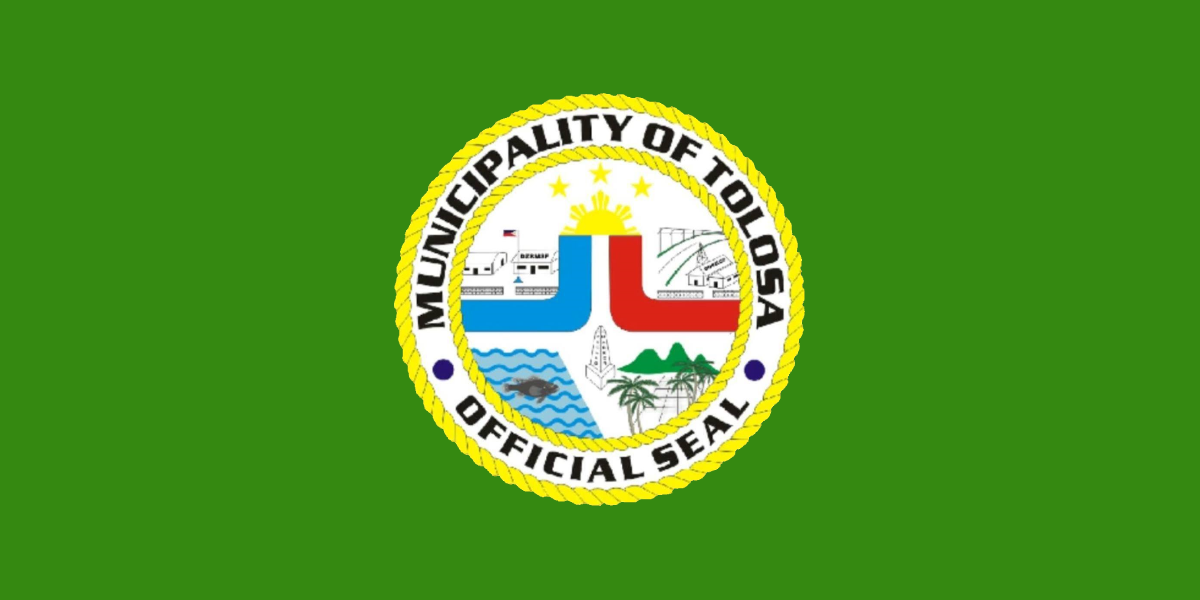
- Flag
- Nickname: Home of Catmon Hill
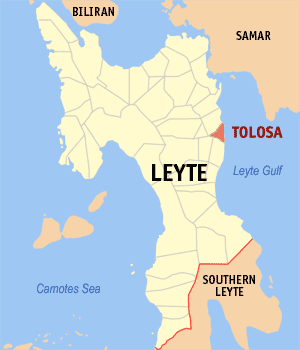
- Map of Leyte with Tolosa highlighted
- Interactive map of Tolosa
- Location within the Philippines
- Coordinates: 11°03′48″N 125°02′07″E
- Country: Philippines
- Region: Eastern Visayas
- Province: Leyte
- District: 1st district
- Founded: 1861 (Separated from the Autonomy of Tanauan, Leyte; 1867 (As a Spanish Pueblo)
- Barangays: 15 (see Barangays)

Government
  - Type: Sangguniang Bayan
  - Mayor: Erwin C. Ocaña
  - Vice Mayor: Elizabeth S. Eracho
  - Representative: Ferdinand Martin G. Romualdez
  - Councilors: List: • Daphne Dayn Roa; • Purisima Z. Ocaña; • Jose Mari Ildefonso C. Roa; • Rolando B. Legaspi; • Ireneo Rolando Lumbre; • Manuel Balledo; • Felicito Beltran III; • Rouen Angely Tubongbanua; DILG Masterlist of Officials
  - Electorate: 15,557 voters (2025)

Area
  - Total: 22.54 km^{2} (8.70 sq mi)
- Elevation: 21 m (69 ft)
- Highest elevation: 779 m (2,556 ft)
- Lowest elevation: 0 m (0 ft)

Population (2024 census)
  - Total: 22,016
  - Density: 976.8/km^{2} (2,530/sq mi)
  - Households: 5,252

Economy
  - Income class: 4th municipal income class
  - Poverty incidence: 24.85% (2023)
  - Revenue: ₱ 113.9 million (2024)
  - Assets: ₱ 393.1 million (2024)
  - Expenditure: ₱ 140.8 million (2024)
  - Liabilities: ₱ 124.9 million (2024)

Service provider
  - Electricity: Don Orestes Romualdez Electric Coperative (DORELCO)
- Time zone: UTC+8 (PST)
- ZIP code: 6503
- PSGC: 0803749000
- IDD : area code: +63 (0)53
- Native languages: Waray; Tagalog

Tolosa, officially the Municipality of Tolosa (Waray: Bungto han Tolosa; Tagalog: Bayan ng Tolosa), is a municipality in the province of Leyte, Philippines. According to the 2024 census, it has a population of 22,016 people.

It is located 24 kilometres (15 mi) south of Tacloban.

The cities closest to Tolosa are Tacloban, Ormoc, Baybay, Borongan, Catbalogan, and Maasin. The nearest municipalities are Tanauan, Tabontabon, Dulag, Palo, Julita, and Dagami. Its distance from the national capital is 588.52 kilometers (365.69 miles).

== History ==
According to popular beliefs, Tolosa derived its name from a legend about three chieftains (datus) who united their chiefdoms. According to the legend, the area that is now Tolosa was ruled by three great datus: the datu of fishing, the datu of harvest and the datu of hunting. Typical of chiefdoms in those times, the three datus regard each other with hostility. One time a great battle broke out among the three of them. Their people fought valiantly in defense of each datu. But the three datus were strong they could not defeat each other. Accidentally they were hit by their own swords and they died. Their blood spilt everywhere. Then came a great earthquake followed by a tsunami. When the floodwaters subsided, three promontories rose on three sides of the three datus' lands, as if acting as defensive walls of the contiguous land. Survivors of the great battle realized that the three hills were their great datus who were now united in protecting them from outside dangers. From three (tolo) they became one (usa).

Tolosa was once part of the nearby municipality of Tanauan. Magdaleno Vivero and Domingo Camacho petitioned the Spanish colonial government to grant Tolosa autonomy from Tanauan, and this was approved in 1852, Residents continued to call the nearby promontory of Inapusong after the town's old name, and Spanish officials named the town after Tolosa in the Basque Country of Spain, which itself was named after the Occitan city of Toulouse in southern France. The town was formally founded in 1861 and became a parish on February 12, 1863, with the first parish priest being Gerónimo Asenjo, a Spaniard. The first Filipino parish priest was Quintín Bautista. In 1910, a plan to abolish the municipality worried its inhabitants. Brígido Lauzon became the first civilian Mayor of Tolosa during American Military Government in 1901. Owing to the efforts of Captain Daniel Romuáldez, grandfather of the late Speaker Daniel Z. Romuáldez, the plan to return Tolosa to control of Tanauan was averted.

During the Liberation of the Philippines in the Second World War, Tolosa and neighboring towns to the northeast were spared from bombardment by the United States and Philippine Commonwealth forces when Eagle Scout Valeriano Abello of Barrio San Roque, including two other identified scouts braved Japanese sniper fire and directed US and Filipino fire to the exact location of Japanese batteries along Leyte's northeastern coast. Abello's act saved the lives of thousands of Leyteños and enabled Allied troops unhampered landing on the coast. This unhampered attack dealt the blow that broke Japanese resistance in Leyte, and ultimately the Philippines.

A few days after the return of General Douglas MacArthur and Allied forces to Leyte, Tolosa became the base of the U.S. Navy, as well as the 6th and 13th Air Force. Tolosa was geographically within Leyte-Samar Naval Base. It was in Barrio Tanghas where American composer Irving Berlin first presented "Heaven Watch the Philippines" before an audience including then-President Sergio Osmeña and Carlos P. Rómulo.

Until the 1970s, the beaches of Tolosa were black due to ann abundance of the mineral magnetite, a naturally magnetized iron which is a prime raw material for making high quality steel. INCO (Iron, Nickel & Copper Ore), a mining company based in Barrio Opong, stripped the town's beaches of vegetation to extract the mineral, and rendering it vulnerable to coastal erosion.

Then-First Lady Imelda Marcos developed an area between the sea and Mt. Inapusong, and built a large compound where she entertained Miss Universe candidates during the pageant held in Manila.

== Geography ==
=== Barangays ===
Tolosa is politically subdivided into 15 barangays. Each barangay consists of puroks and some have sitios.

- Burak
- Canmogsay
- Cantariwis
- Capangihan
- Doña Brigida
- Imelda
- Malbog
- Olot
- Opong
- Poblacion
- Quilao
- San Roque
- San Vicente
- Tanghas
- Telegrafo

== Demographics ==
Population census of Tolosa

Year	Pop.	±% p.a.
1903	5,177	—
1918	5,160	−0.02%
1939	6,660	+1.22%
1948	8,569	+2.84%
1960	8,156	−0.41%
1970	9,226	+1.24%
1975	10,747	+3.11%
1980	10,864	+0.22%

Year	Pop.	±% p.a.
1990	13,299	+2.04%
1995	13,927	+0.87%
2000	14,539	+0.93%
2007	16,839	+2.05%
2010	17,921	+2.29%
2015	20,978	+3.05%
2020	20,708	−0.27%
2024	22,016	+1.48%

Source: Philippine Statistics Authority

In the 2024 census, the population of Tolosa was 22,016 people, with a density of 890 inhabitants per square kilometre or 2,300 inhabitants per square mile.

== Economy ==
Poverty incidence of Tolosa (%)

Source: Philippine Statistics Authority

== Government ==
The Municipality of Tolosa, is a Fourth - class Local Government Unit. it is headed by the Municipal Mayor which elected at - large every three years. The Vice Mayor serves as the presiding officer of the Sangguniang Bayan, with the eight (8) regular Sangguniang Bayan members. The President of the Association of Barangay Councils (ABC) and the President of the Pamabayang Pederasyon ng mga Sangguniang Kabataan (PPSK) serves part of the Sangguniang Bayan as Ex - Officio Members.

In 1900, Juan Catindoy was appointed as Presidente Munisipal. In 1901, the First Local Elections was held that put Brigido Lauzon in the Mayoralty. Since then, it was succeeded by various known personalities, including the Late House Speaker Daniel Z. Romualdez's Father, Miguel Romualdez who served as Mayor from 1904 - 1908.

As of 2025, Erwin Cinco Ocaña is the Incumbent Municipal Mayor, while Engr. Elizabeth Saito Eracho is the incumbent Vice - Mayor.

Below are the list of the Municipal Mayors of Tolosa since 1900.

No.	Image	Mayor	Deputy (later Municipal Vice Mayor)	Starting date	Ending date
Municipal President of Tolosa, Province of Leyte
1		Juan Catindoy		1900	1901
2		Brigido Lauzon		1901	1902
3		Miguel L. Romualdez		1904	1908
4					
5		Quirimon Almaden		1910s	
6		Norberto Vergara	Eugenio Ramos (1919 - 1922)	1919	1922
Municipal Mayor of Tolosa, Province of Leyte
7		Balbino Kahano		1941	1942
8		Adolfo Vivero		1944	1945
9		Cesario Colasito		September 20, 1945	1946 (OIC)
10		Luis A. Trinchera		June 15, 1946	December 30, 1948
11		Cesario Colasito		January 1, 1949	December 30, 1951
(10)		Luis A. Trinchera		January 1, 1952	December 30, 1955
12		Matias A. Palaña, Sr.		December 30, 1955	December 30, 1959
13		Uldarico M. Lauzon	Gorgonio Palaña	December 30, 1959	December 30, 1963
(10)		Luis A. Trinchera	Martin P. Lauzon	December 30, 1963	December 30, 1967
14		Dalmacio R. Colasito	Manuel P. Raz	January 1, 1968	December 30, 1971
15		Ildefonso C. Roa		January 1, 1972	January 23, 1980
16		Pedro K. Palaña, Jr.		January 23, 1980	February 29, 1980
17		Cesar T. Palaña		July 1, 1980	June 30, 1986
18		Eliodoro Lauzon		1986	1987
19		Sabiniano M. Soyosa		1987	1988
20		Felicisimo M. Zabala		February 2, 1988	June 30, 1992
21		Ildefonso C. Roa	Emmanuel P. Kempis (1992 - 1995)	June 30, 1992	June 30, 1995
22		Edilberto V. Zabala, Sr.	Erwin C. Ocaña (1995-1998) Agapito L. Mendoza Jr. (1998-2001) Hilario G. Caadan (2001-2004)	June 30, 1995	June 30, 2004
23		Hilario G. Caadan	Erwin C. Ocaña	June 30, 2004	June 30, 2010
24		Erwin C. Ocaña	Virginia Palaña (2010 - 2013) Hilario Caadan (2013 - 2016) Rodolfo B. Legaspi (2016 - 2019)	June 30, 2010	June 30, 2019
25		Maria Ofelia O. Alcantara	Rodolfo B. Legaspi (2019 - 2022)	June 30, 2019	June 30, 2022
(24)		Erwin C. Ocaña	Menardo M. Mate (2022 - 2025) Elizabeth S. Eracho (2025 - present)	June 30, 2022 - present	

== Elected Officials ==
2025-2028 Tolosa, Leyte Officials
Position	Name	Party
Mayor	Erwin C. Ocaña	Lakas
Vice Mayor	Elizabeth S. Eracho	Aksyon
Councilors	Daphne Dayner B. Roa	Lakas
Councilors	Purisima Z. Ocaña	Independent
Councilors	Jose Mar I. Roa Jr.	Lakas
Councilors	Rolando B. Legaspi	Independent
Councilors	Ireneo Rolando A. Lumbre	Aksyon
Councilors	Manuel B. Balledo	Lakas
Councilors	Felicito DC. Beltran III	Independent
Councilors	Rouen Angely M. Tubongbanua	Aksyon
Ex Officio Municipal Council Members
ABC President	Melanie Felisa M. Vivero	Nonpartisan
SK Federation President	Catherine C. Benjamin	Nonpartisan

== Tourism ==
- Karisyuhan Festival & Tribu Bungkaras of San Roque, Tolosa Leyte
- Kalipayan or Olot Mansion
- Romualdez Mausoleum
- Sacred Heart Shrine on top of the bulwark of Mt. Inapusong
- Miramar Beach, former U.S Navy base
- Bil-At Beach Resort
- St. Michael Parish Church
- Statue of late Speaker Daniel Z. Romualdez
- Monument of Eagle Scout Valeriano Abello, one of the three hero scouts of the Philippines during World War II.
- The steep rocky slopes of Mt. Inapusong
- Pacific-borne waves for surfing
