= There Must Be Somebody Else =

Single by Ben Bernie And His Hotel Roosevelt Orchestra
- B-side: "Carefree"
- Released: 1927
- Genre: Jazz standard
- Length: 2:36
- Label: Brunswick
- Songwriters: Maceo Pinkard; Archie Gottler; Sidney Clare

A 1928 performance of the song by Adele Rowland

"There Must Be Somebody Else" is a 1927 American popular song written by Maceo Pinkard, Archie Gottler and Sidney Clare. It is considered a jazz standard and has been recorded many times.

The song was a hit when first published, and was covered by numerous artists including Ben Bernie and His Hotel Roosevelt Orchestra, Annette Hanshaw, Ben Selvin & His Orchestra and Belle Baker. It was also featured in a Vitaphone Varieties short film, Stories in Song (1928) as one of four songs performed by Adele Rowland. The song was part of Louis Armstrong's repertoire. Barbara Rosene included the song as a track in the 2007 album It Was Only a Sun Shower.

== See also ==
- List of 1920s jazz standards
