= Swingmatism =

c. 1941 jazz composition by William Scott, featuring Charlie Parker

Song
- Released: 1941
- Genre: Jazz
- Composer: William Scott

"Swingmatism" is a jazz standard, composed by William Scott, and featuring Charlie Parker. It was originally recorded on April 30 1941 with Gus Johnson, though the best known version dates to 1942. According to author Dave Oliphant it "illustrates how, with a good 'swing' rhythm section, one can play bebop and still have it fit." The tune, composed in F Minor, is noted for its "sixteen-bar sections in the minor and modulation to the parallel major, through the use of a diminished chord".
