= Blue Devil Blues =

"Blue Devil Blues" is a 1929 blues/jazz standard by Babe Stovall. It was first recorded in November 1929 by Walter Page and the Oklahoma City Blue Devils, with vocals by Jimmy Rushing. It is described as "not strictly speaking a blues, but a rather simplistic, old-fashioned minor-key piece" in the key of C minor.

The latter half of the tune, featuring vocals by Jimmy Rushing, is in a 12-bar blues form.
