= Baby Dear =

Dixieland tune composed by Thamon Hayes & Benny Moten

"Baby Dear" is a Dixieland tune composed by Thamon Hayes & Benny Moten. It was first recorded by Bennie Moten with the Kansas City Orchestra for Okeh Records in 1924, and later by Mary Lou Williams and her Kansas City Seven. Both records are available on YouTube:

- Bennie Moten:
- Mary Lou Williams:
