= Drum Boogie =

1941 jazz song by Gene Krupa

"Drum Boogie" is a 1941 jazz "boogie-woogie" standard, composed by Gene Krupa and trumpeter Roy Eldridge and originally sung by Irene Daye, soon replaced by Anita O'Day.

== Movie appearance ==
It was first recorded on January 17, 1941 in Chicago and was also featured in a film that year, Ball of Fire, performed by Krupa and his band in an extended version, when it was lip-synced by Barbara Stanwyck, whose singing was dubbed by Martha Tilton.

== Other versions ==
In 1942, Ella Fitzgerald sang the song on tour with the Gene Krupa Orchestra. In 1953, Gene Krupa played the song at the US-operated Ernie Pyle Theatre in Tokyo, which "brought the house down" according to The Pittsburgh Courier.

== Analysis ==
David Dicaire referred to the song as "Krupa's best drum solo, an accumulation of twenty years of studying the intricacies of rhythmic textures". It is an E flat blues boogie-woogie progression with lyrics such as "Boogie! You hear the rhythm rompin'! Boogie! You see the drummer stompin'! It really is a killer!". In 1971 The Danville Register cited it as one of "50 Great Songs" of the Swinging 40's.
