= Nem Um Talvez =

"Nem um Talvez"

Song by Hermeto Pascoal
- Genre: Jazz

"Nem Um Talvez" (Not Even a Maybe) is a jazz standard composed by Hermeto Pascoal, first appearing on the Miles Davis 1971 album Live-Evil, which featured Hermeto as a guest musician. It is sometimes known as "Nenhum Talvez". On the record, it is wrongly attributed to Miles Davis. In the album Live-Evil, Hermeto sings "Nem Um Talvez" in unison with Davis.

== Overview ==
Another well-known recording of the song is on the album Sanctuary by Barney Wilen, featuring Philip Catherine and Palle Danielsson.

More recently, it has been recorded by the Jason Marsalis Vibes Quartet on the record In a World of Mallets, released in 2014. DownBeat, the American jazz magazine, described the rendition as "haunting".
