= Gut Stomp =

Gut Stomp is a 1943 jazz standard by stride pianist James P. Johnson. It entirely features pianist Johnson on solo piano with a distinctive stride progression. Johnson played it especially for "southerners" in New York City because they were "country people and they felt homesick". Although he and Willie "The Lion" Smith were playing "Gut Stomp" or something similar at clubs in Manhattan in earlier times, Johnson only officially recorded it along with "Mule Walk" and "Carolina Balmoral" in 1943.
