= Ronnie Sundin (singer) =

New Zealand teen rock singer of the 1960s

Ronnie Sundin (1944–2021) was a New Zealand teen rock singer of the 1960s. He was paired with Will Jess and his Jesters, one of local label Viking Records' house bands, and aged 16 released Sea of Love ahead of the song reaching No.1 in the US R&B charts. His second single, a duet with Daphne Walker was "Best Wishes" written by Sam Freedman. Another six further singles, all with Will Jess and his Jesters, followed, released together as his sole album. Sundin died peacefully on Sunday 9 May 2021, survived by his son, Mark.
