= Best Wishes (Duke Ellington song) =

Song by Duke Ellington
- Released: 14 June 1933
- Recorded: 17 May 1932
- Genre: Jazz
- Songwriter: Duke Ellington
- Lyricist: Ted Koehler

"Best Wishes" is a 1932 Duke Ellington song, one of his own tunes, with words by Ted Koehler. The tune was first recorded 17 May 1932. However, in 1933 on a visit to England, Ellington claimed that "Since I have been in England I have composed a new number entitled Best Wishes, which was played and broadcast on June 14 (1933) for the first time." Ellington also stated that he had dedicated the song "the title not the lyrics", to Britain, that the tune would give British listeners "a better insight into the Negro mind".
