= Heaven Watch the Philippines =

Song by Irving Berlin
- Written: 1946
- Songwriter: Irving Berlin

"Heaven Watch the Philippines" is a song by Irving Berlin written in 1946.

It was written as a tribute to Filipino resistance during the Japanese occupation in World War II. During World War II, Japanese troops in the Philippines attempted to popularize self-glorifying songs such as "Chichi Yo Anata Wa Tsuyokatta" ("Father, You Were Brave" in English). Locals resisted these efforts, preferring instead to sing "God Bless the Philippines" to the tune of Berlin's "God Bless America" as a show of national pride. Berlin dedicated the song to General of the Army Douglas MacArthur in commemoration of the liberation of the Philippines.

Berlin himself gave the first performance of "Heaven Watch the Philippines" in Tolosa, Leyte, in 1946, in front of an audience that included Sergio Osmeña and Carlos P. Romulo.

Berlin was touring U.S. military bases with a stage production of This Is the Army, in 1945. During a stop in the Philippines, he heard children in Leyte singing the song God Bless America (which he had written in 1918 and had revised in 1938) with the lyric "God Bless the Philippines". Touched by that and feeling that they might like a song of their own, he composed "Heaven Watch the Philippines", trying to combine the spiritual quality of "God Bless America" with their feeling for America and desire to be free. He taught the song to schoolchildren in Leyte and sang the song in the finale of the show when This Is the Army opened in Leyte. Berlin had donated the "God Bless America" royalties to the Boy Scouts of America, and he presented the rights to "Heaven Watch the Philippines" to the Commonwealth of the Philippines with the instruction that if they ever sold the song in the Philippines for profit, the proceeds were to be given to the Boy and Girl Scouts of the Philippines.

In a 1987 interview with Playboy, Imelda Marcos falsely claimed that Berlin had written "Heaven Watch the Philippines" specifically for her. When asked about her claim, the 99-year-old Berlin denied it outright.
