= List of jazz standards =

For a list of the core jazz standards, see the following lists by decade:

- Before 1920
- 1920s
- 1930s
- 1940s
- 1950s and later

For a looser, more comprehensive A-Z list of jazz standards and tunes which have been covered by multiple artists, see the List of jazz tunes.
