= Mahagnao Volcano =

Dormant volcano in the Philippines

- Location within Visayas Location within Philippines

Highest point
- Elevation: 860 m (2,820 ft)
- Listing: Inactive volcano
- Coordinates: 10°52′28″N 124°51′34.79″E

Geography
- Country: Philippines
- Region: Eastern Visayas
- Province: Leyte
- City/municipality: Burauen; La Paz; MacArthur

Geology
- Mountain type: Stratovolcano
- Last eruption: 1895 (disputed)

Mahagnao Volcano also known as part of (Mahagnao Volcano Natural Park) is a dormant stratovolcano located in the Barangay Mahagnao part of the municipality of Burauen province of Leyte, Philippines. It is also bounded by the municipalities of La Paz and MacArthur. The area is mostly composed of wetland forests and also the birth of many rivers and streams flowing on many part of Burauen and on its neighboring towns.

Because of numerous streams, rivers and similar kind bodies of water, Burauen has been known with its nicked name as the Spring Capital of Leyte. Mahagnao Volcano Natural Park is about 65 kilometers south of Tacloban City and 18 kilometers away from the town center of Burauen.

== Physical Features ==
The summit of the volcano is a steep-walled heavily forested crater that opens to the south with a peak elevation of 860 metres (2,820 ft). Located on the volcano flanks are fumaroles and mudpots.

On the southern flank of the volcano, two crater lakes are located, Lakes Danao and Malagsom. Hot Springs are located on the southern shore of Lake Danao (not to be confused with the other Lake Danao which is located near Ormoc City and part of Lake Danao Natural Park). Lake Malagsom is a crater lake with green acidic water.

Rocks primarily found on the volcano are andesite.

== Eruptions ==
An eruption was reported to have occurred in 1895. It is a phreatic eruption

== Listings ==
The Philippine Institute of Volcanology and Seismology (PHIVOLCS) classifies Mahagnao as Inactive volcano. Although the volcano has been inactive, it is classified as potentially active due to the active thermal features of the mountain.

== Mahagnao Volcano Natural Park ==
Mahagnao Volcano is the focal point of the Mahagnao Volcano National Park created on August 27, 1937 with Proclamation No. 184 with an area encompassing 635 hectares (1,570 acres). Under the National Integrated Protected Areas System (NIPAS) of the Department of Environment and Natural Resources, the park was renamed to Mahagnao Volcano Natural Park with Proclamation No. 1157 on February 3, 1998.

The 341-hectare Mahagnao Volcano and Natural Park, an ecotourism site which re-opened in June, 2022 is a new campsite with different natural attractions - a lake, falls, multi-colored mud, old-growth forest, with melastoma pods and a lagoon. Calor Hot Spring at the volcano's southern foot is heated by an active thermal feature. The Burauen LGU offers 2 tour packages -- the Tanguile and Bulkan trails which end at Malagsum Lake, which features the Philippine long-tailed macaque, green, acidic water and a sanctuary for about 2,000 wild ducks of varied species.

== See also ==
- List of active volcanoes in the Philippines
- List of potentially active volcanoes in the Philippines
- List of inactive volcanoes in the Philippines
- List of natural parks of the Philippines
- List of protected areas of the Philippines
