= Leyte =

Island in the Philippines

Leyte Island
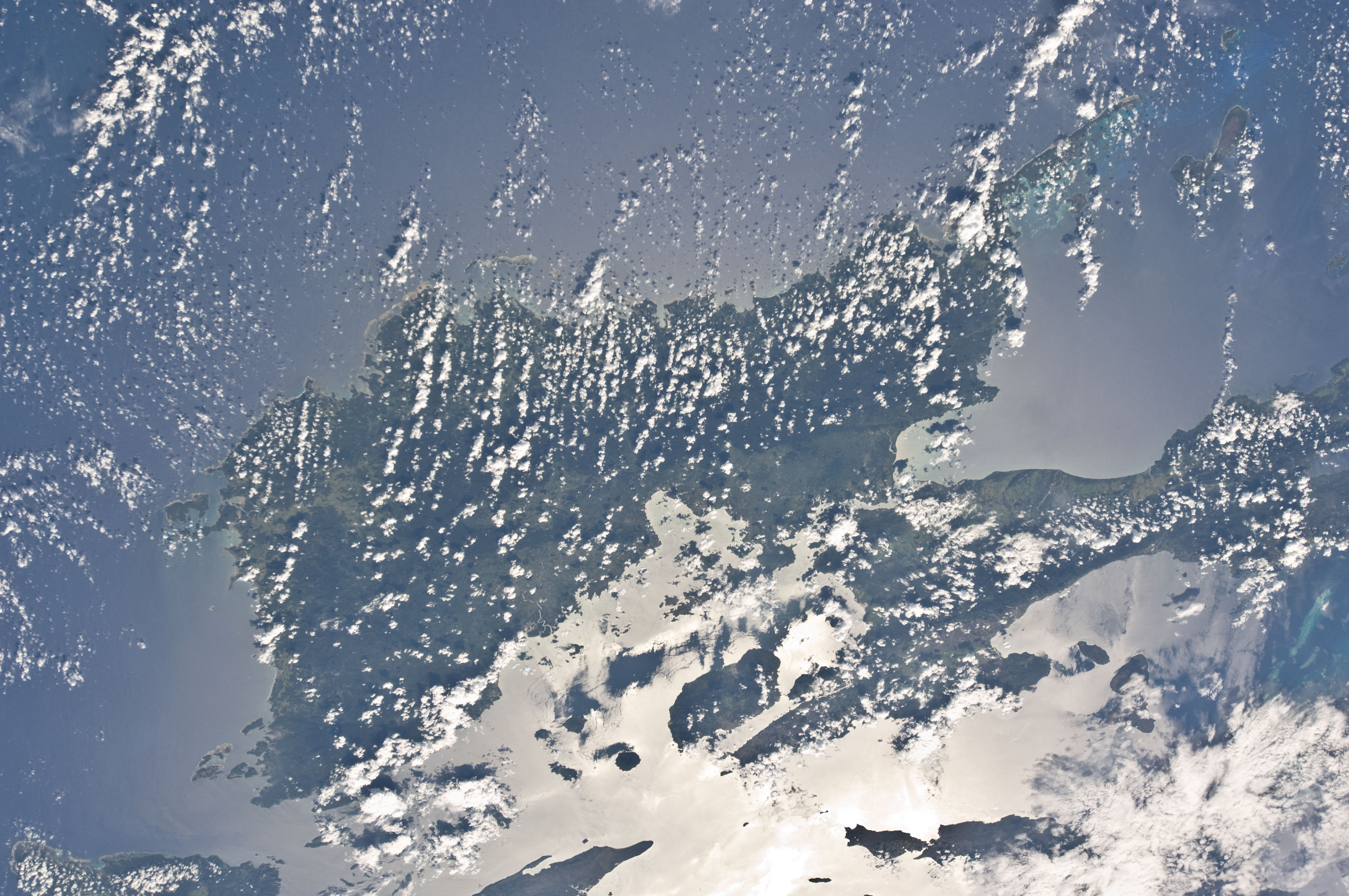
- Photograph from the ISS with east on top; Samar is in the centre, with Leyte in the right foreground.

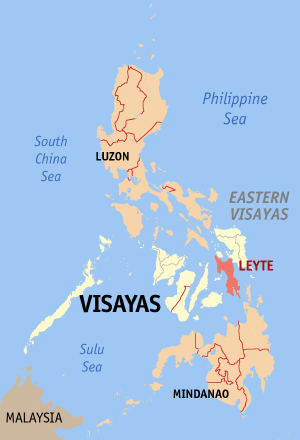
- Location of Leyte (red) within the Philippines

Geography
- Location: Maritime Southeast Asia
- Coordinates: 10°48′N 124°54′E
- Archipelago: Visayas
- Adjacent to: Bohol Sea; Camotes Sea; Canigao Channel; Carigara Bay; Leyte Gulf; Samar Sea; San Juanico Strait; Sogod Bay; Surigao Strait; Visayan Sea
- Area: 7,367.6 km^{2} (2,844.6 sq mi)
- Area rank: 98th
- Highest elevation: 1,332 m (4370 ft)
- Highest point: Alto Peak

Administration
- Philippines
- Region: Eastern Visayas
- Provinces: Leyte; Southern Leyte
- Largest settlement: Tacloban (pop. 259,353)

Demographics
- Population: 2,626,970 (2020)
- Population rank: 35th
- Pop. density: 324.2/km^{2} (839.7/sq mi)
- Languages: Filipino; English; Waray; Cebuano; Baybay; Kabalian
- Ethnic groups: Visayans (Cebuano, Waray); Mamanwa

Additional information
- Time zone: Philippine Standard Time (UTC+8)

Leyte (/ˈleɪti, ˈleɪteɪ/ LAY-tee, LAY-tay, Tagalog: [ˈleite]) is an island in the Visayas group of islands in the Philippines. It is eighth-largest and sixth-most populous island in the Philippines, with a total population of 2,626,970 as of the 2020 census. It is among the world's 35 most populous islands, with a similar population to Jamaica or Zealand.

Since the accessibility of land has been depleted, Leyte has provided countless number of migrants to Mindanao. Most inhabitants are farmers. Fishing is a supplementary activity. Rice and corn (maize) are the main food crops; cash crops include coconuts, abaca, tobacco, bananas, and sugarcane. There are some manganese deposits, and sandstone and limestone are quarried in the northwest.

Politically, the island is divided into two provinces: (Northern) Leyte and Southern Leyte. Territorially, Southern Leyte includes the island of Panaon to its south. To the north of Leyte is the island province of Biliran, a former sub-province of Leyte.

The major cities of Leyte are Tacloban, on the eastern shore at the northwest corner of Leyte Gulf, and Ormoc, on the west coast.

Leyte today is notable for the geothermal electric power plants near Ormoc.

== History ==
=== Pre-colonial period ===
The island was known to 16th-century Spanish explorers as Tandaya. Its population grew rapidly after 1900, especially in the Leyte and Ormoc valleys. The island was once the location of Mairete, a historic community which was ruled by Datu Ete. Before being colonized by Spain, the island was once home to indigenous animist Warays to the east and other indigenous animist Visayan groups to the west. In the early 17th Century Father Ignacio Alcina, recorded a local epic that a certain Datung Sumanga of Leyte courted the princess, Bugbung Humasanum of Bohol by raiding Imperial China, and upon their marriage, they were the precursors of a kingdom there.

=== Colonial period ===
Leyte was once labeled as Ceylon in early Spanish maps of the Philippines and in the 1700s, was home to 38 Spanish Filipino families and 7,678 native families. The number of Spanish Filipino families increased to 56 by year 1818. Specifically; Matalom had 2 Spanish-Filipino families, Dulag had 14, Tanauan had 29, while Tacloban had 11.

=== World War II ===
In the Western world, Leyte is most famous for its role in the reconquest of the Philippines in World War II. The province was utilized by the Japanese as a hub for sexual slavery. Some sex slave sites included Tacloban and Burauen, where the Japanese kidnapped girls, teenagers, and young adults and forced them into becoming sex slaves under the brutal "comfort women" system. On 20 October 1944, General Douglas MacArthur waded ashore on Leyte, saying, "I have returned", but the Japanese continued to resist strongly in the Battle of Leyte. The convergence of naval forces resulted in the four-day Battle of Leyte Gulf, the largest naval battle in history. During World War II the island was part of a large US Navy base Leyte-Samar Naval Base.

== Geography ==
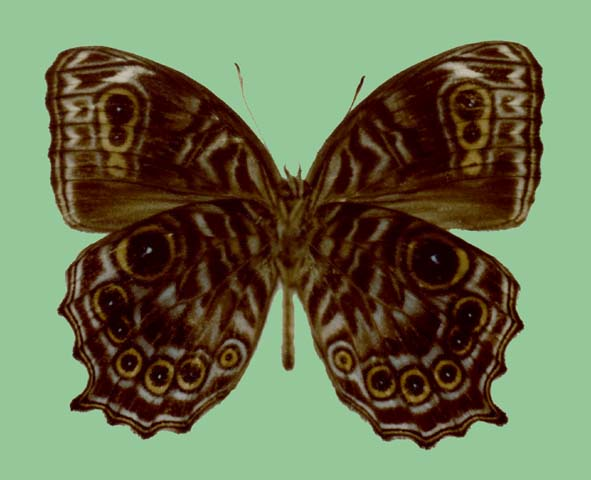
Ptychandra ohtanii lizae is a butterfly only found on Leyte.

The island measures about 180 kilometres (110 mi) north-south and about 65 kilometres (40 mi) at its widest point, giving it an area of 7,368 km^{2} (2,845 sq mi), putting Leyte among the world's 100 largest islands, with a size similar to Zealand or Prince Edward Island. In the north it nearly joins the island of Samar, separated by the San Juanico Strait, which becomes as narrow as 2 kilometres (1.2 mi) in some places. The island province of Biliran is also to the north of Leyte and is joined to Leyte island by a bridge across the narrow Biliran Strait. To the south, Leyte is separated from Mindanao by the Surigao Strait. To the east, Leyte is somewhat "set back" from the Philippine Sea of the Pacific Ocean, Samar to the northeast and the Dinagat Islands to the southeast forming Leyte Gulf. To the west is the Camotes Sea.

Leyte is mostly heavily forested and mountainous, but the Leyte Valley in the northeast has much agriculture.

== Demographics ==
Population of Leyte Island
Year	Pop.	±% p.a.
1990	1,689,756	—
2000	1,952,496	+1.46%
2010	2,188,295	+1.15%
2015	2,388,519	+1.68%
2020	2,626,970	+2.02%
Source: National Statistics Office

== Historical and other famous sites ==
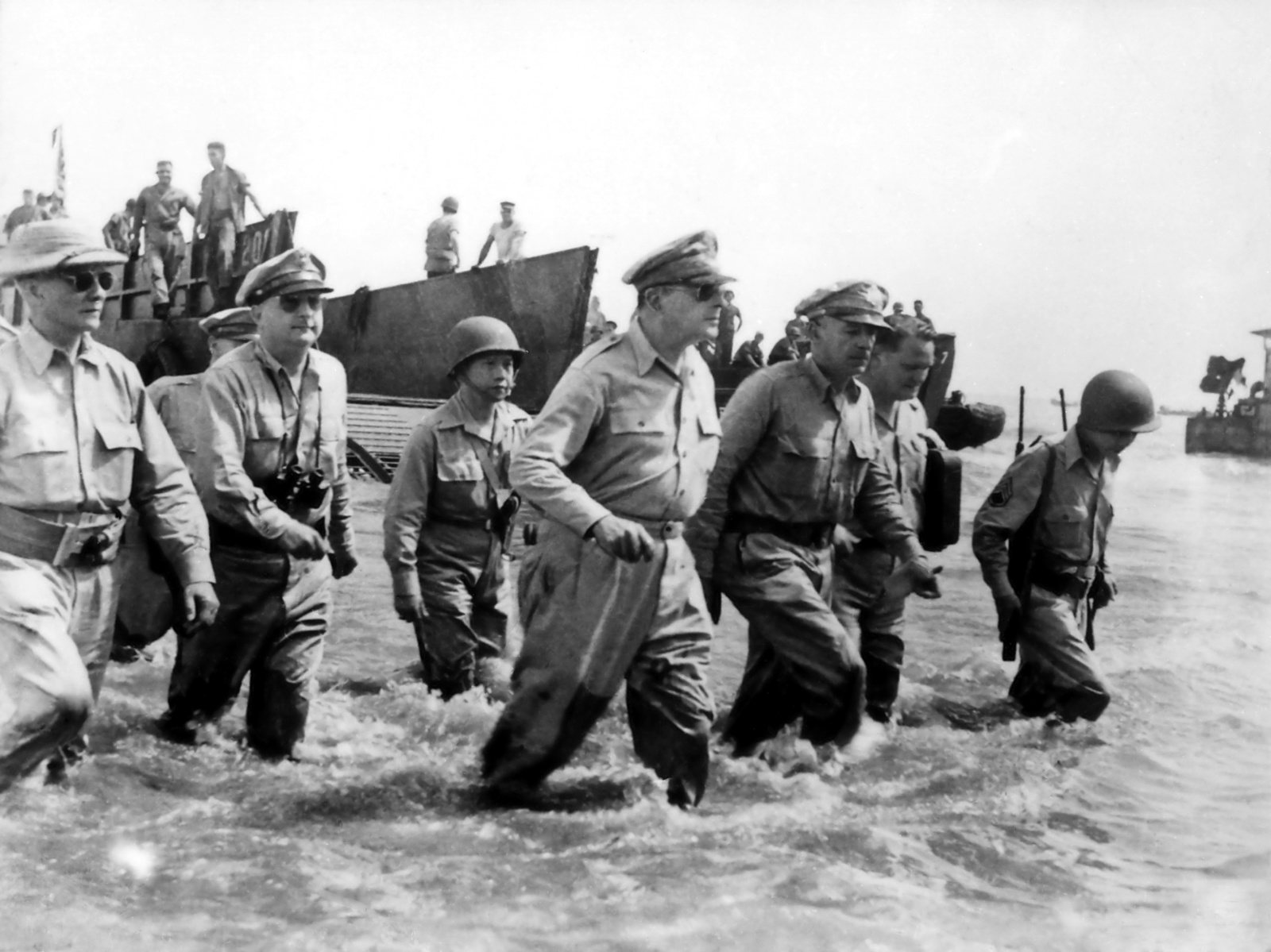
Battle of Leyte: General Douglas MacArthur and staff land at Dulag Beach, Leyte, 20 October 1944.

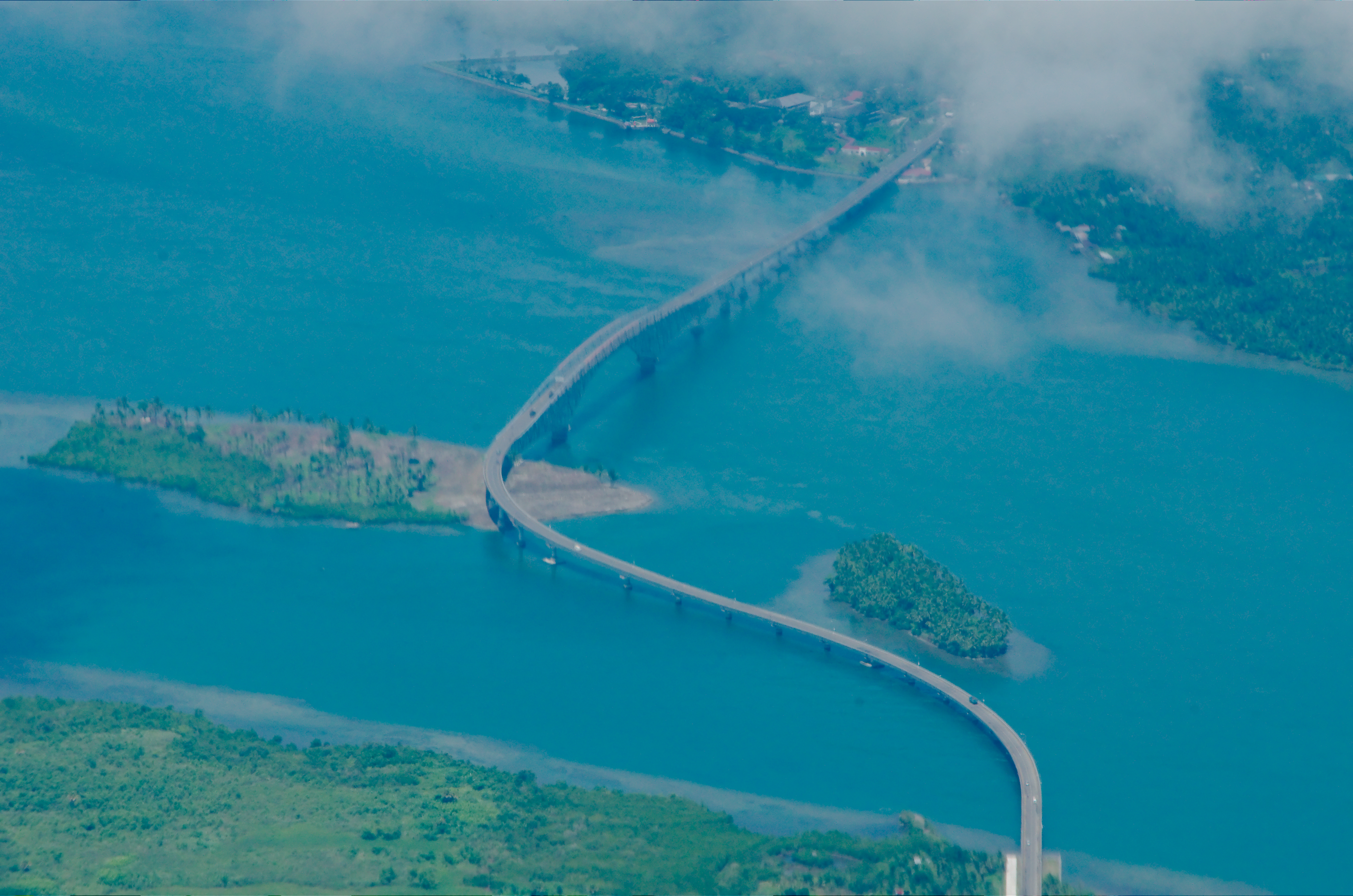
San Juanico Bridge connecting Samar to Leyte

The Leyte provincial capitol is the seat of the provincial government where there is a mural depicting the First Mass in the Philippines, believed to have happened in Limasawa, and the landing of General Douglas MacArthur.

The MacArthur Landing Memorial National Park in Red Beach, Palo, marks the 1944 landing by the American liberation forces. It also has a lagoon where a life-sized statue of Gen. MacArthur stands.

Mahagnao Volcano Natural Park Located in Burauen, Leyte, about 66 km (41 mi) from Tacloban City, the Mahagnao Volcano Natural Park attracts visitors with its lakes, craters, hot springs, multi-colored mud, virgin forests and lagoon. It was proclaimed as a national park in 1937. Like other regions in the Philippines, the area enjoys a temperate climate. It has an elevation of 1,200 meters above sea level and an area of 635 ha (1,570 acres), within the boundaries of Burauen, La Paz and McArthur towns.

Lake Danao is a guitar-shaped lake hemmed by the cloud-capped Anonang-Lobi mountain ranges.

Kalanggaman Island in Palompon, Leyte is a virgin island with pure white sand. The ecological atmosphere of the island had been preserved by the municipality.

The Sto. Nino Shrine and Heritage Museum boasts the painting of the fourteen stations of the cross done by Filipino artists and a bas-relief of the legend of the first Filipino man and woman (Malakas and Maganda).

The San Juanico Bridge is the longest bridge in the Philippines.

Leyte Island is the birthplace of the Tinikling dance, popular throughout the Philippines.

On 8 November 2013, Super Typhoon Yolanda (Haiyan) destroyed 70-80% of the structures in its path on Leyte province. An estimated 10,000 people died and up to 620,000 people were displaced across the region.

Leyte was affected by Tropical Storm Megi (2022).

== Infrastructure ==
=== Flood control ===
Leyte Tide Embankment Project was conceptualized as part of the program on rehabilitation from the aftermath of the strongest typhoon, to build safer cities/communities. The flood control shall cover a length of about 27.3 kilometers stretching from the shoreline of Barangay Diit, Tacloban City passing through the entire shoreline of the Municipality of Palo, Leyte and ending up to Barangay Ambao of Tanauan, Leyte.

== In popular culture ==
The 1959 Japanese film Nobi ("Fires on the Plain"), though filmed in Japan, is set in Leyte in 1945. The film was remade in 2014, under the same name; this version was filmed in the Philippines.
