= Lake Danao (Leyte) =

Lake in Leyte, Philippines

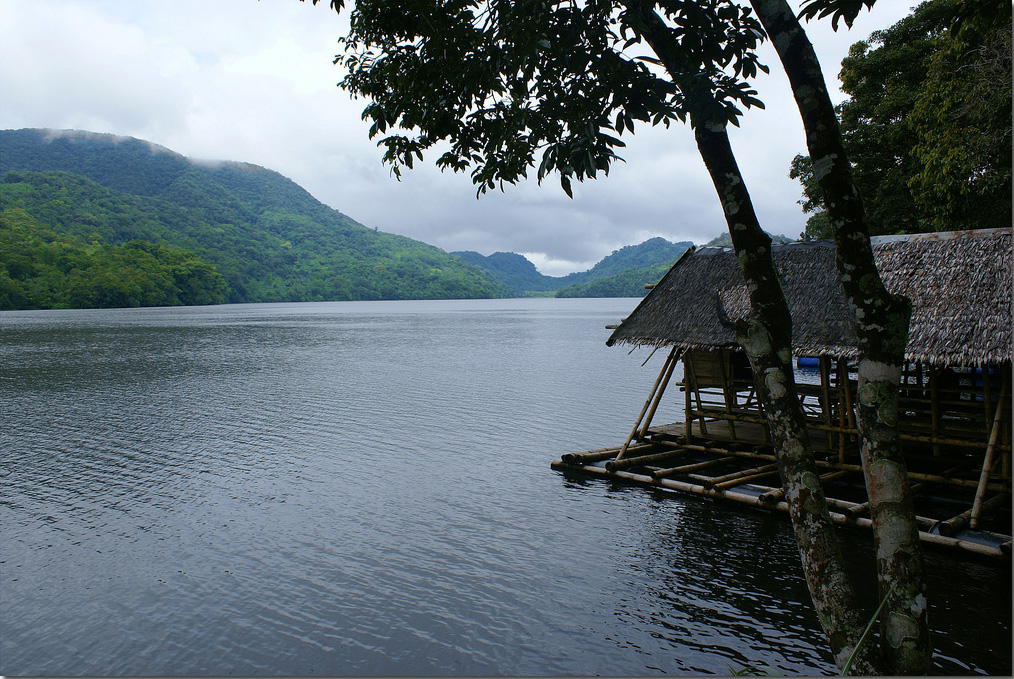

- Location within the Philippines
- Location: Leyte
- Coordinates: 11°4′16″N 124°41′38″E
- Basin countries: Philippines
- Surface area: 148 ha (370 acres)
- Average depth: 80 m (260 ft)
- Surface elevation: 650 m (2,130 ft)
- Settlements: Ormoc

Lake Danao is a guitar-shaped volcanogeneic lake on the island of Leyte in the Philippines.

The lake covers an area of 148 hectares (370 acres) within the 2,193 hectares (5,420 acres) Lake Danao Natural Park, which also includes the Amandiwin Mountains. The lake is 18 kilometres (11 mi) northeast of Ormoc, a half-hour drive along the San Pablo-Tongonan and Milagro-Lake Danao roads.

It was originally named Lake Imelda after First Lady Imelda Marcos and was declared a national park on June 2, 1972 through a presidential memorandum issued by then President Ferdinand Marcos. Later, it was renamed and declared as Lake Danao National Park on February 3, 1998 through Proclamation No. 1155, and is now protected by Republic Act No. 7586, the National Integrated Protected Area System (NIPAS) Act of 1992.

The lake supplies potable water to at least seven towns in eastern Leyte including Tacloban and is the source of irrigation for ricelands in some municipalities like Dagami, Burauen, Pastrana and Tabontabon.

At 650 metres (2,130 ft) above sea level, Lake Danao lies on an altitude similar to Tagaytay in Cavite, making the area cooler than average Philippine temperatures.

== Origin ==
The lake is volcanic in origin and is probably a graben or depression produced by the Philippine Fault (or Leyte Central Fault), an active fault traversing the lake in a N-S direction. Rock formations of the surrounding mountains include andesitic volcanic rocks of Quaternary origin on the western side, andesitic and dacitic volcanics of Miocene origin in the southeastern portion, and intermediate volcanic sediments of Quaternary origin on the northeastern side of the lake. There are also wetlands found near the lake. The present lake could be the deepest portion of a much larger lake in the past which could have included these wetlands and marshes. Sedimentation has probably transformed this portion of the lake into what it is today.

== Threats ==
Various sectors of the local community had been studying the lake and its ecosystem. The major threat of avifaunal species in Lake Danao Natural Park is hunting. Key informants revealed that hunters are not only the local residents but many of them also come from other places. Birds that are mostly hunted are hornbills, doves, and pigeons. Slash-and-burn of forest for agricultural cultivation and illegal logging also has contributed to the degradation of some parts of the protected area. Establishment of human settlements within the park is also a serious threat. There have been recorded illegal settlements within the vicinity of the lake that could greatly affect its ecosystem.

== See also ==
- List of natural parks of the Philippines
- List of protected areas of the Philippines
