= Burauen =

Municipality in Leyte, Philippines

- Municipality
- Municipality of Burauen
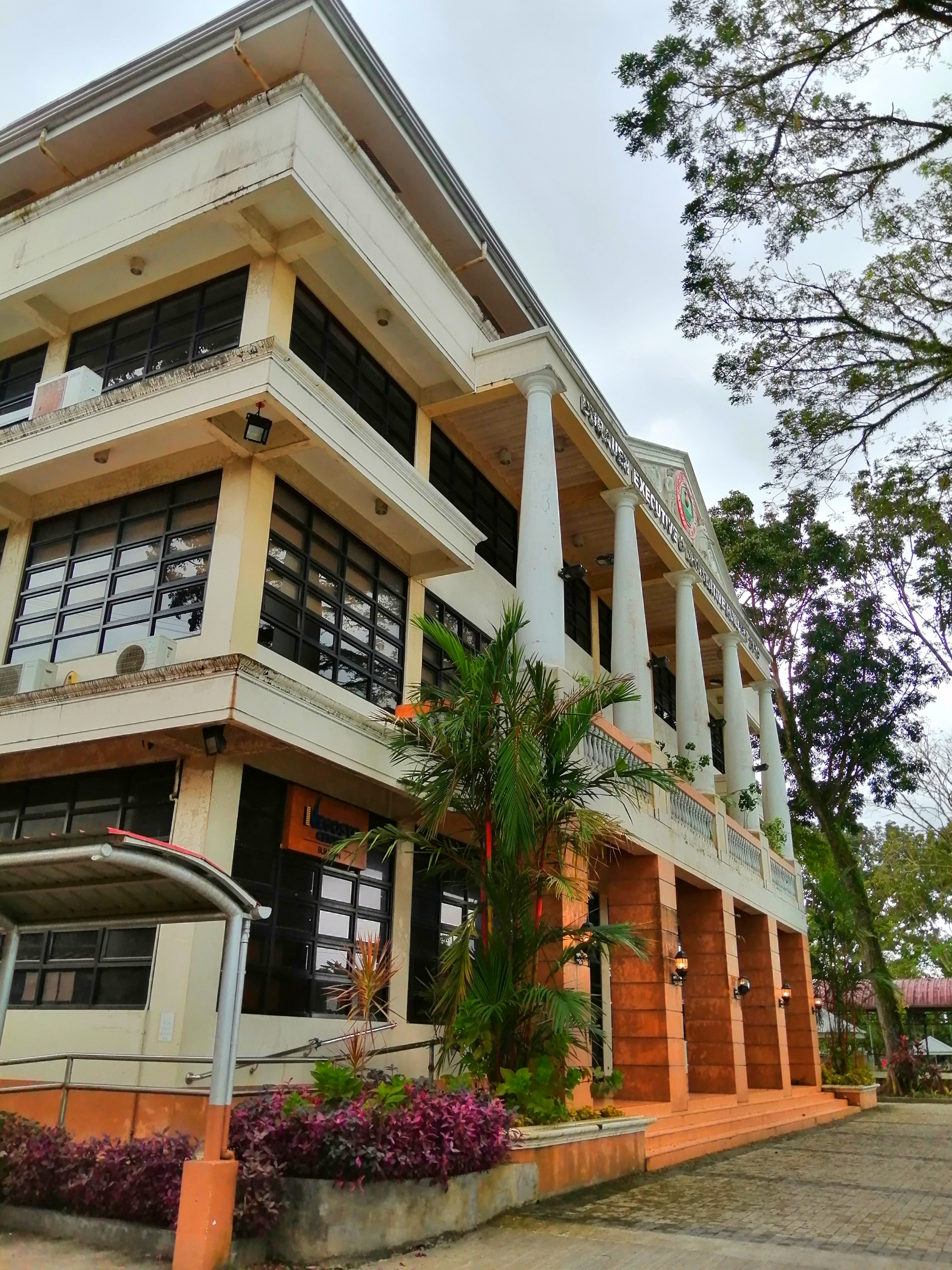
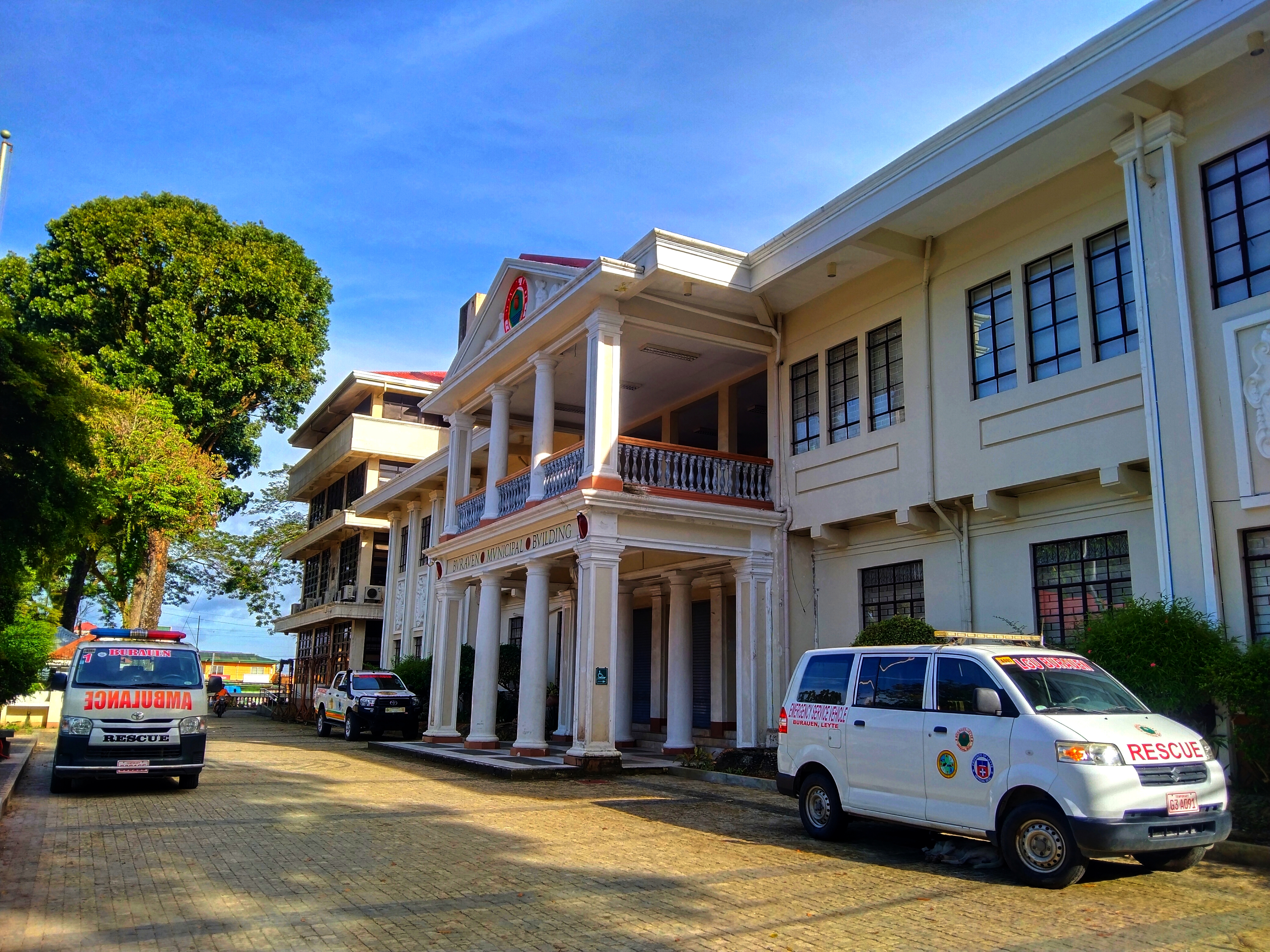
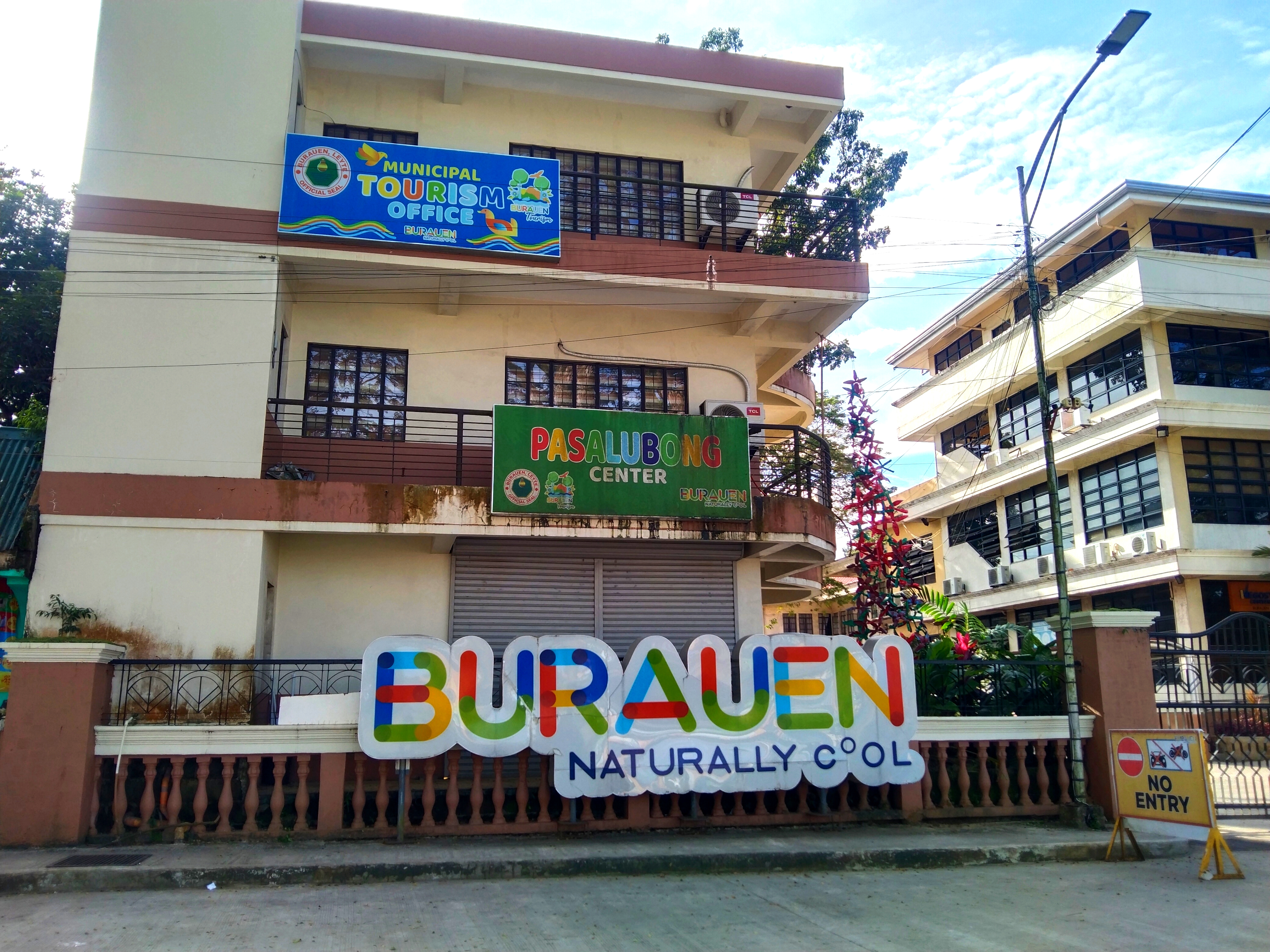
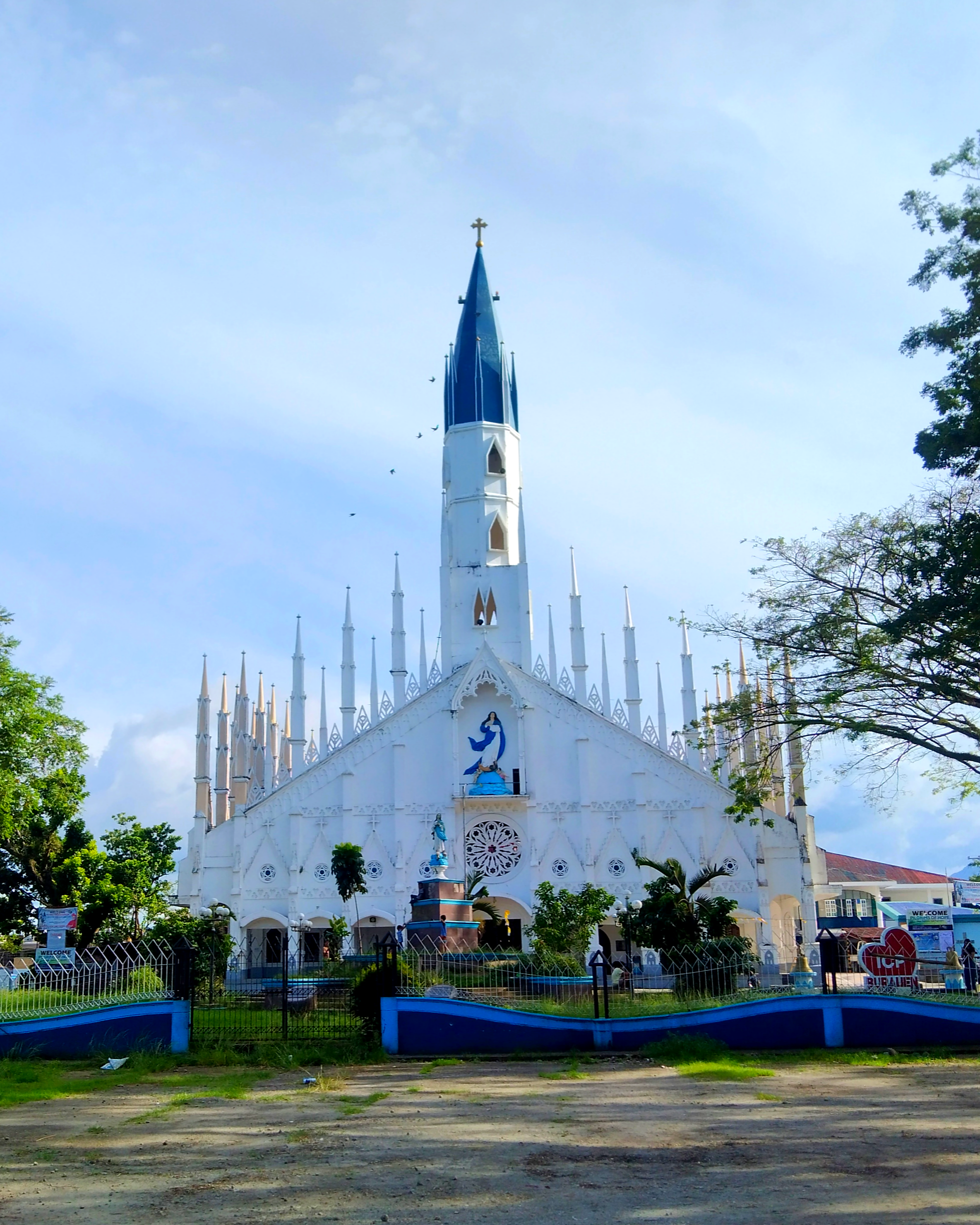
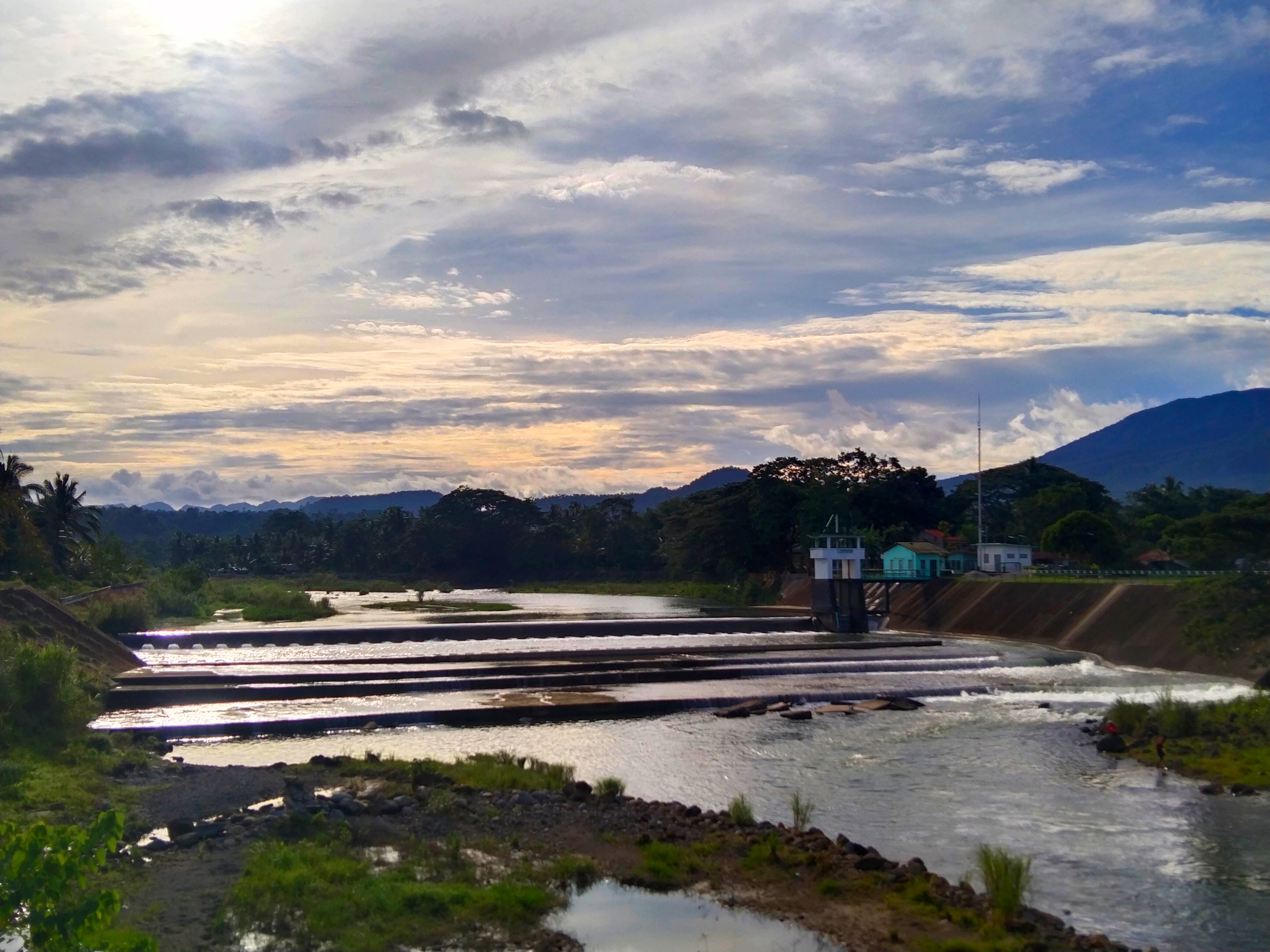
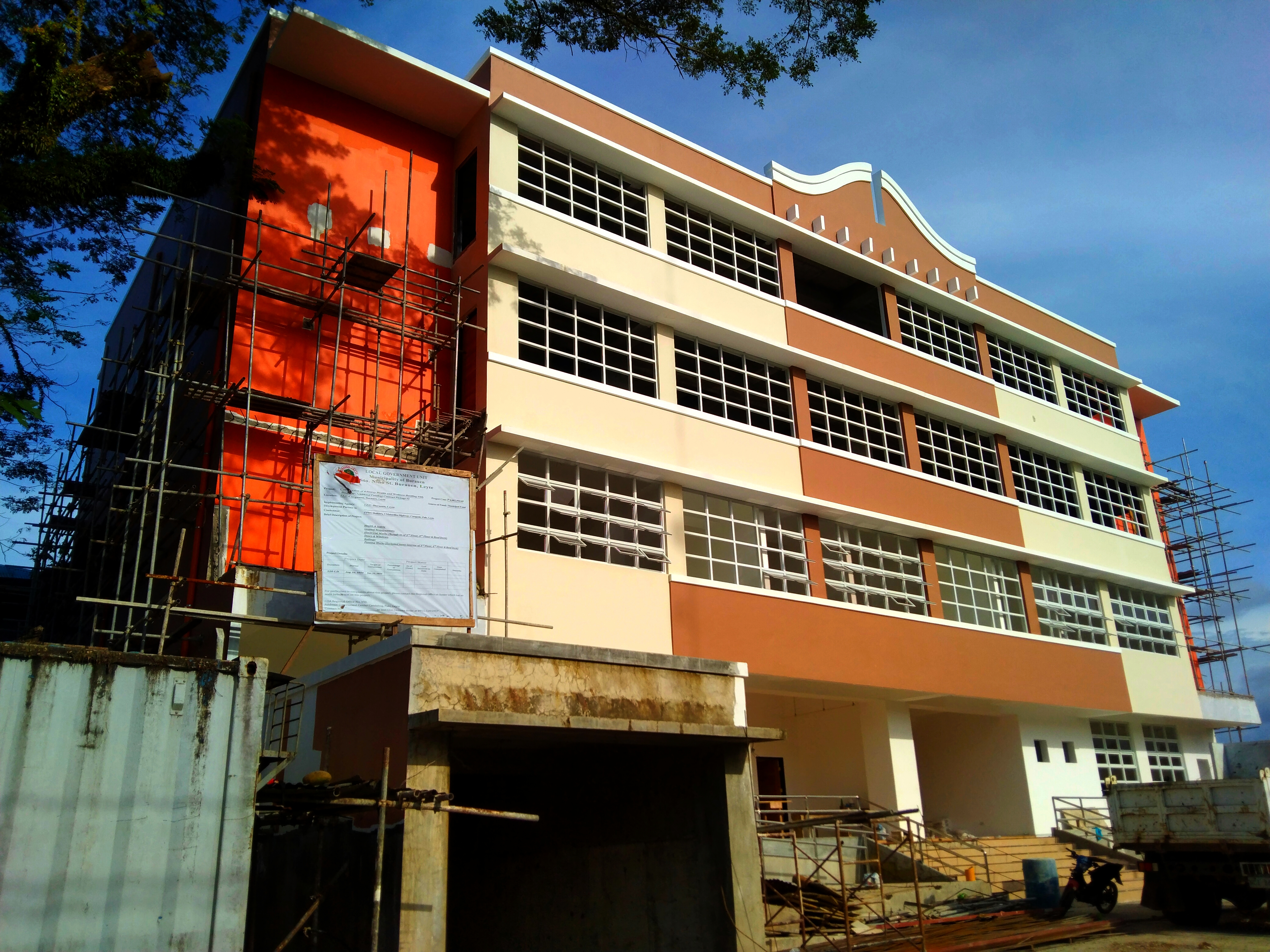
- Burauen Executive and Legislative Building Burauen Municipal Hall Tourism Office & Pasalubong Center Immaculate Conception Parish of Burauen Daguitan River and NIA Irrigation Facility Burauen Health & Wellness Center Building

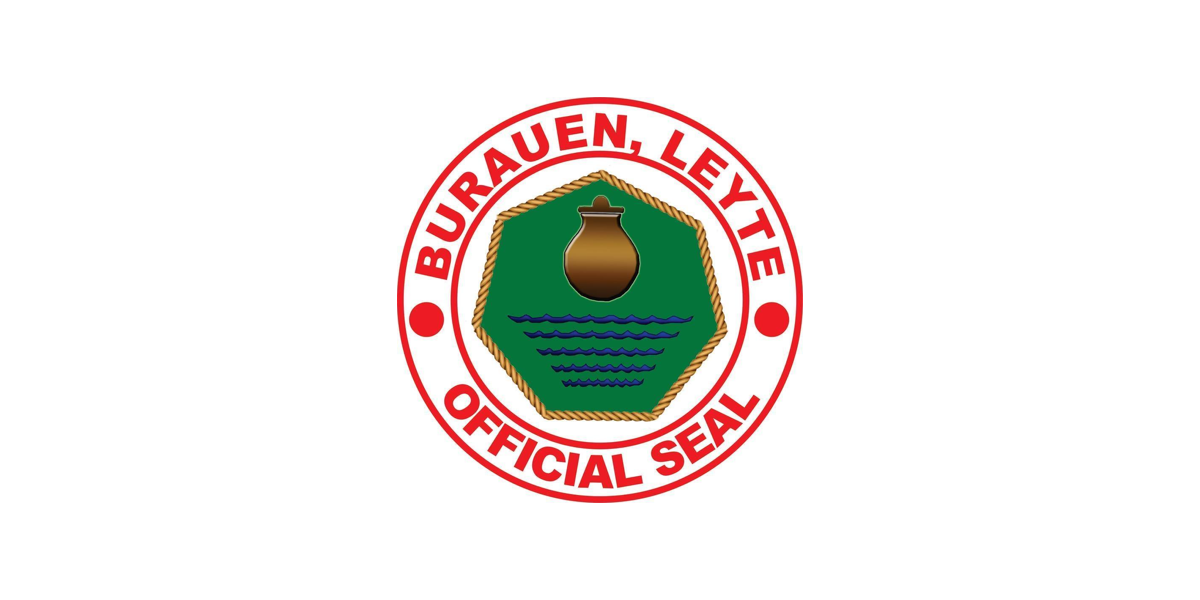
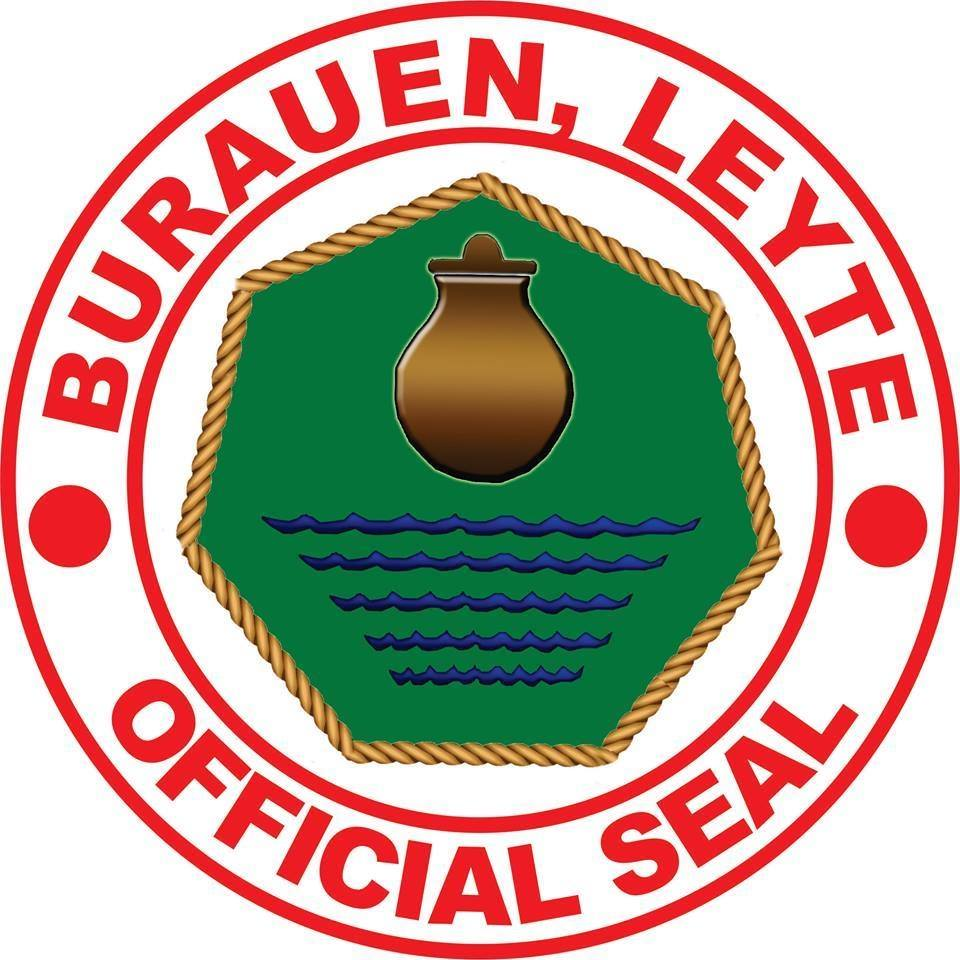
- Flag Seal

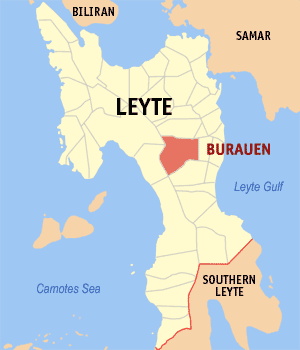
- Map of Leyte with Burauen highlighted
- Interactive map of Burauen
- Location within the Philippines
- Coordinates: 10°59′N 124°54′E
- Country: Philippines
- Region: Eastern Visayas
- Province: Leyte
- District: 2nd district
- Barangays: 77 (see Barangays)

Government
  - Type: Sangguniang Bayan
  - Mayor: Fe S. Renomeron
  - Vice Mayor: Warren V. Hermano
  - Representative: Lolita T. Javier
  - Councilors: List: • Bryan R. Cinco; • George Bensen S. Tan; • Leo S. Apostol; • Juanito E. Renomeron; • Cheeryl Y. Ducentes; • Hermenia C. Camasin; • Sean T. Cordero; • Andres Rey L. Cagara; DILG Masterlist of Officials
  - Electorate: 36,133 voters (2025)

Area
  - Total: 317.32 km^{2} (122.52 sq mi)
- Elevation: 229 m (751 ft)
- Highest elevation: 1,319 m (4,327 ft)
- Lowest elevation: 0 m (0 ft)

Population (2024 census)
  - Total: 54,635
  - Density: 172.18/km^{2} (445.93/sq mi)
  - Households: 13,815

Economy
  - Income class: 1st municipal income class
  - Poverty incidence: 29.88% (2023)
  - Annual Regular Income: ₱453.17 million (2025)
  - Locally Sourced Revenue: ₱172. million (2024)
  - LSR Rank (Municipality): Top 1 (Regional)
  - Assets: ₱1.14 billion (2023)
  - Assets rank (Provincial): Top 4 (Municipality)
  - IRA: ₱236.1 million (2024)
  - Expenditure: ₱272.9 million (2024)
  - Liabilities: ₱192.8 million (2023)

Service provider
  - Electricity: Don Orestes Romualdez Electric Coperative (DORELCO)
  - Water: Burauen Waterworks System
  - Telecommunications: Bayan Telecommunications, Globe Telecom, Smart Communications, Dito Telecommunity
  - Cable TV: Sky Cable, Leyte Cable Network, Satellite, G-sat, Cignal
  - Internet Providers: Converge ICT, Globe Fiber, PLDT, Starlink
- Time zone: UTC+8 (PST)
- ZIP code: 6516
- PSGC: 0803710000
- IDD : area code: +63 (0)53
- Native languages: Waray; Tagalog
- Major religions: Roman Catholicism
- Feast date: December 7–8
- Website: https://www.burauenleyte.gov.ph

Burauen (IPA: [bu'ɾaʊen]), officially the Municipality of Burauen (Waray: Bungto han Burauen; Tagalog: Bayan ng Burauen), is a First Income Class municipality in the province of Leyte, Philippines. According to the 2024 census, it has a population of 54,635 people.

== Etymology ==
The name “Burauen” evolved from the word “haru” which means “spring”. This is because Burauen is the fountainhead of several rivers: the big Daguitan and Marabong rivers, the Guinarona and Hibuga rivers that pass through several neighboring towns, as well as several smaller ones. The legend behind the name speaks of a drought when several tributaries of these rivers dried up, forcing people to flock to a cluster of large springs in the town. The place was duly called “Buraburon” which, according to Justice Norberto Lopez Romualdez Sr., is the “multiplicative construction of the word “haru” (spring), which indicates “abundance”. Over the years, the name “Buraburon” (“having many springs”) evolved into “Burawon” and finally into “Burauen”.

== Elected Officials ==
2025-2028 Burauen, Leyte Officials
| Position | Name | Party |
|---|---|---|
| Mayor | Fe S. Renomeron | NPC |
| Vice Mayor | Warren V. Hermano | Independent |
| Councilors | Bryan R. Cinco | Independent |
| Councilors | George Bensen S. Tan | NPC |
| Councilors | Leo S. Apostol | NPC |
| Councilors | Juanito E. Renomeron | NPC |
| Councilors | Cheeryl Y. Ducentes | NPC |
| Councilors | Hermenia C. Camasin | NPC |
| Councilors | Sean T. Cordero | NPC |
| Councilors | Andres Rey L. Cagara | NPC |
Ex Officio Municipal Council Members
| ABC President | TBD | Nonpartisan |
| SK Federation President | TBD | Nonpartisan |

== History ==
=== Early history and foundation ===
Burauen is one of the oldest inland settlements on the island of Leyte. Historical accounts indicate that Jesuit missionaries formally established the settlement in 1595 during the Spanish colonial era as part of the Christianizing central Leyte.

The municipality derived its name from the local term burabod or buraburon, meaning “spring” or “water source,” referring to the abundance of natural springs in the area.

Archaeological discoveries in the municipality, including burial jars, stone tools, and Chinese ceramics, suggest that the area had established settlements and trade activities prior to Spanish colonization.

=== Spanish Colonial Era ===
Between 1609 and 1616, Burauen emerged as one of the largest and most populous settlements in Leyte and Samar during the Spanish era. Due to its fertile plains and strategic inland location, the town developed into an important agricultural and missionary center in Eastern Visayas. The municipality became known for rice cultivation, coconut production, root crops, and abacá (Manila hemp), which later became one of the town’s major economic drivers.

By the early 20th century, Burauen had become one of the wealthiest municipalities in the Visayas due to its flourishing abaca industry.

=== Philippine–American War ===
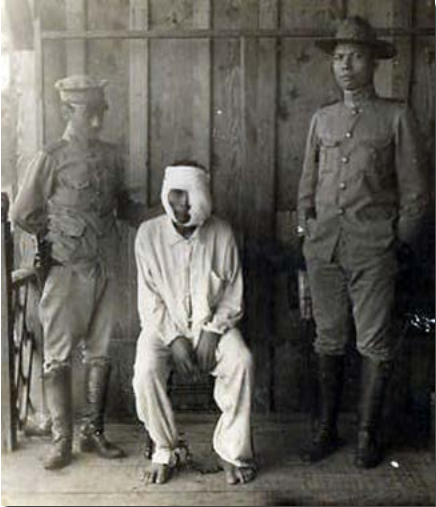
A captured photo of the Pulahan movement Leader, Faustino Ablen (Center) sitting between a standing member of Philippine Constabulary and an African-American soldier

During the Philippine–American War, revolutionary forces led by General Ambrosio Mójica operated extensively within Burauen and neighboring towns. On 4 July 1900, American forces burned large portions of the town during military operations against Filipino resistance fighters.

The destruction of the municipality contributed to the rise of the Pulahan movement in Leyte, an anti-American resistance and religious movement active in the early 1900s.

In the early 1900s, Burauen became one of the leading economic centers in Eastern Visayas due to the rapid expansion of the abaca trade. Several notable developments occurred during this period such as the establishment of irrigation systems in 1912, installation of one of the earliest electric systems in Leyte and Samar in 1916, opening of one of the first cinematographic houses in the region, and modernization of municipal infrastructure and public markets.

Historical accounts also state that the municipality’s revenue at one point exceeded the provincial income of Surigao because of the booming hemp industry.

=== World War II ===
During World War II, Japanese Imperial forces occupied Burauen.

The outbreak of World War II stunted the economic growth of Burauen. The Japanese Military encamped the eastern part of the poblacion there were many encounters between the Japanese forces and the guerillas who were firmly established in their mountain strongholds. In August 1944, the Japanese established a "comfort station" in the town, where the invaders enslaved local girls, teens, and young adults into becoming sex slaves called "comfort women", who were routinely gang-raped and murdered by Japanese soldiers. During the Allied liberation of Leyte on October 20, 1944, Burauen was among the most devastated towns in Leyte, thousands of civilians were killed and a number of properties were destroyed.

=== Post-war period to present ===
Following the devastation of the War, Burauen entered a long period of rehabilitation and modernization that reshaped the municipality into one of the important inland economic and educational centers of Leyte. The town had suffered extensive destruction during the liberation of Leyte in 1944, with heavy casualties and widespread damage to homes, public infrastructure, and agricultural lands.

==== Immediate Post-war Rehabilitation (1945–1950s) ====
In the years immediately after the war, the people of Burauen focused on rebuilding agriculture, restoring public institutions, and reviving local commerce. Educational recovery became one of the municipality’s earliest priorities. In 1946, the Burauen High School was established, while the historic Gabaldon school buildings were rehabilitated.

The rehabilitation of public utilities followed shortly afterward. In 1948, the Burauen Water System began operations with technical assistance from the National Waterworks and Sewerage Authority (NAWASA), improving access to potable water for residents.

Private educational institutions also emerged during this period. The founding of the Burauen Catholic Institute and Rizal Colleges in 1950 strengthened secondary and tertiary education opportunities within the municipality.

However, recovery was repeatedly disrupted by natural disasters. In 1951, Burauen was struck by a powerful typhoon, followed by several additional storms that damaged farms, roads, and public buildings. Despite financial hardship, the municipal government repaired the municipal hall in 1952 using local funds, symbolizing the community’s determination to rebuild.

==== Economic and Institutional Expansion (1960s–1970s) ====
The 1960s marked the beginning of renewed economic growth. On March 2, 1962, the Rural Bank of Burauen was established, becoming the first rural bank in both Leyte and Samar. The institution played an important role in supporting farmers, traders, and small entrepreneurs in the post-war rural economy.

Infrastructure development also accelerated during this era. Roads, bridges, irrigation systems, and public markets were expanded, improving agricultural productivity and trade connections between Burauen and neighboring municipalities.

Healthcare services improved significantly with the opening of the Burauen General Hospital on April 1, 1972. The facility expanded medical access for residents of central Leyte and nearby upland communities.

==== Local Governance and Modernization (1980s–2000s) ====
After the 1986 EDSA Revolution and the implementation of the Local Government Code of 1991, Burauen benefited from increased Internal Revenue Allotment (IRA) funding from the national government. These funds enabled the municipality and its barangays to pursue major infrastructure and public service projects.

Throughout the 1990s, the local government invested heavily in farm-to-market roads, particularly in upland barangays where agriculture remained the primary source of livelihood. In 1998, the municipality acquired heavy equipment to support road opening and widening projects, helping farmers transport products more efficiently.

The municipality also undertook major improvements to its water infrastructure. In 2004, the Burauen Water Works System underwent rehabilitation and expansion to address increasing demand from both urban and rural communities.

In 2009, the municipal government completed the Burauen Commercial Complex, which included sections for dry goods, grains, fish, meat, fruits, vegetables, transport terminals, and market facilities. The project modernized commercial activity in the town center and reinforced Burauen’s role as a trading hub in inland Leyte.

==== Disaster Resilience and Contemporary Development (2010s–Present) ====
Burauen continued modernizing its infrastructure during the 2010s. In compliance with the Ecological Solid Waste Management Act (RA 9003), the municipality established a sanitary landfill facility that began operations in April 2015.

The same year, the municipality inaugurated a new four-storey Executive and Legislative Building housing the offices of the mayor, treasury department, and Sangguniang Bayan.

Like many parts of Eastern Visayas, Burauen was heavily affected by Super Typhoon Yolanda (Haiyan) in 2013. Recovery efforts involved support from the national government, non-government organizations, and international aid agencies. Rehabilitation focused on restoring infrastructure, housing, and community services.

The municipality also benefited from regional infrastructure connectivity projects. The development and rehabilitation of the Burauen–Albuera road network improved transport links between eastern and western Leyte, allowing faster movement of agricultural goods and easier market access for upland farmers.

In recent years, Burauen has increasingly positioned itself as an emerging educational, agricultural, and service center in central Leyte. Expansion in healthcare, public education, transportation infrastructure, and local governance projects has contributed to its continuing urban and economic rise.

=== Timeline ===
In 1595, Spanish Jesuits discovered the settlement of Burauen. Its community was used as their base in the Christianisation on the central part of Leyte.

Between the years 1609 to 1616 Burauen was the most populous town of Leyte and Samar and it consistently registered the highest tax collection during the same period in the region.

In 1873, from being a missionary church under the diocese of Dagami, Burauen was carved out and declared as a separate town.

In 1912, municipal administrations of that time were able to put up irrigation system.

In 1916, the first electric system and cinematographic house in Leyte and Samar was established in Burauen.

In 1918, La Paz detached itself from Burauen to become an independent municipality.

In 1928, the Burauen Academy, the first secondary school in the municipality was founded.

In 1949, or just a few years after world war 2, President Elpidio Quirino issued an executive order no.278 separating Julita from burauen.

In the 1950s, several prominent encargado or tenyente del barrio improved the system in Burauen. Binatac, Reataza, Coral, Gaspay and Estrada are among the prominent encargado.

In 1962, the Rural Bank of Burauen was established. Making it the very first rural bank in both islands of Samar and Leyte.

== Geography ==
Burauen is located in the central part of Leyte Island, bounded to the north by Dagami and Tabontabon, on the east by Julita, south by La Paz and Macarthur, on the west by Albuera and Ormoc City and on the southwest by Baybay City.

=== Barangays ===
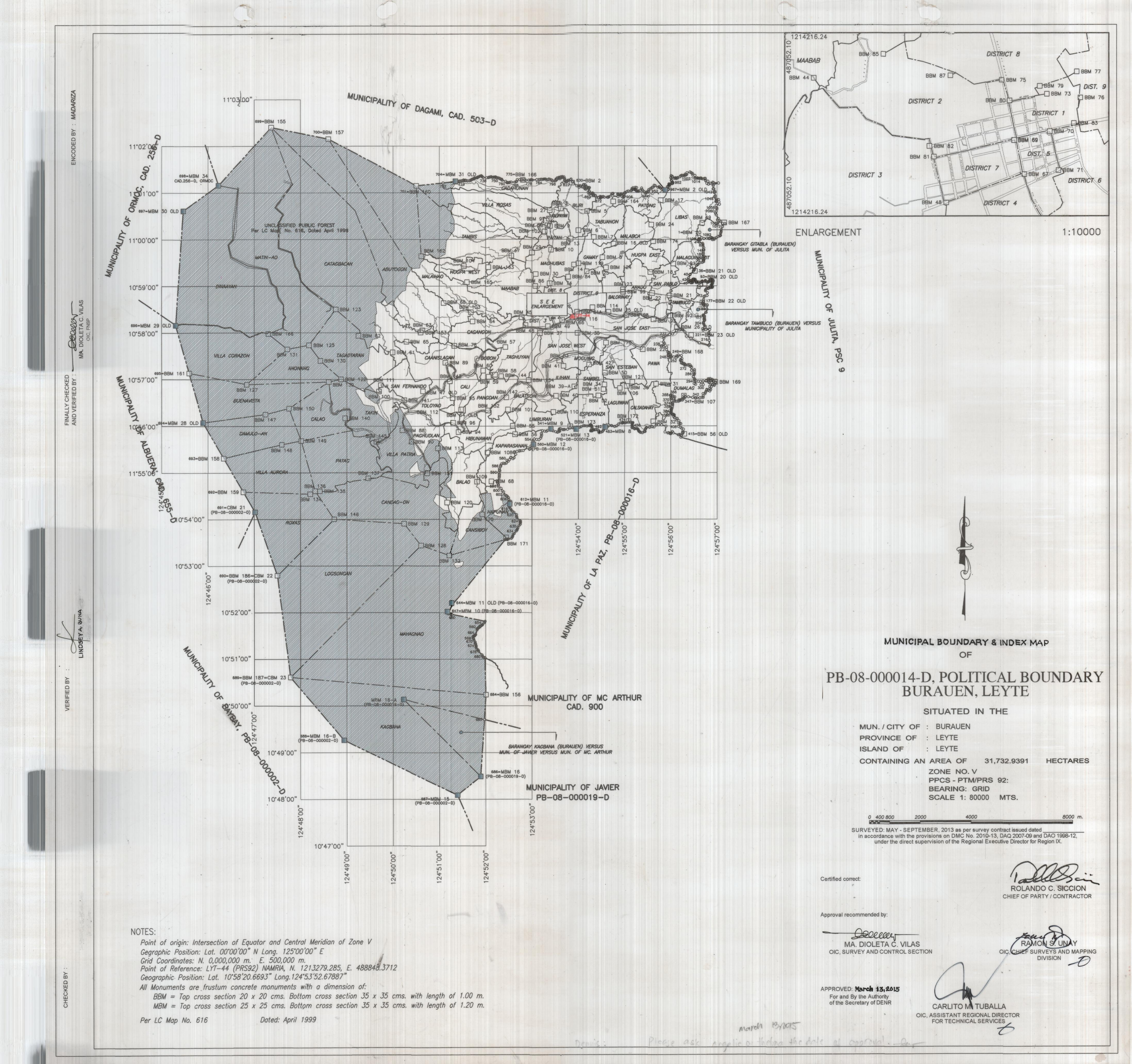
A map showing the exact political and territorial boundary of Burauen, Leyte and its Barangays

Burauen is politically subdivided into 77 barangays. Each barangay consists of puroks and some have sitios.

- Abuyogon
- Anonang
- Arado
- Balao
- Balatson
- Balorinay
- Bobon
- Buenavista
- Buri
- Caanislagan
- Cadahunan
- Cagangon
- Calao
- Cali
- Calsadahay
- Candag-on
- Cansiboy
- Catagbacan
- Dumalag
- Damulu-an
- Dina-ayan
- Esperansa
- Gamay
- Gitablan
- Hapunan
- Hibonawan
- Hugpa East
- Hugpa West
- Ilihan
- Kagbana
- Kalipayan
- Kaparasanan
- Laguiwan
- Libas
- Limburan
- Logsongan
- Maabab
- Maghubas
- Mahagnao
- Malabca
- Malaguinabot
- Malaihao
- Matin-ao
- Moguing
- Poblacion District I
- Poblacion District II
- Poblacion District III
- Poblacion District IV
- Poblacion District V
- Poblacion District VI
- Poblacion District VII
- Poblacion District VIII
- Poblacion District IX
- Paghudlan
- Paitan
- Pangdan
- Patag
- Patong
- Pawa
- Roxas
- Sambel
- San Esteban
- San Fernando
- San Jose East
- San Jose West
- San Pablo
- Tabuanon
- Tagadtaran
- Taghuyan
- Takin
- Tambis
- Tambuko
- Toloyao
- Villa Aurora
- Villa Corazon
- Villa Patria
- Villa Rosas

=== Climate ===
Burauen has a tropical rainforest climate (Köppen climate classification: Af), characterized by consistently high temperatures, high humidity, and abundant rainfall throughout the year. The municipality experiences no pronounced dry season, although relatively drier conditions usually occur from February to May.

Under the climate classification system of the Philippine Atmospheric, Geophysical and Astronomical Services Administration (PAGASA), Burauen generally falls under Type II climate, which is characterized by the absence of a dry season and with maximum rainfall occurring from November to January. The municipality is frequently influenced by the northeast monsoon, intertropical convergence zone, and tropical cyclones affecting the Eastern Visayas region.

Temperatures in Burauen remain relatively uniform throughout the year, with average temperatures ranging from 26 °C (79 °F) to 28 °C (82 °F). The warmest months are typically from May to August, while slightly cooler conditions occur from December to February. Due to its inland location and proximity to mountainous terrain and forested areas in central Leyte, the municipality also experiences frequent cloud cover and high atmospheric moisture.

The wetter season in Burauen generally lasts from June to February, with November being among the wettest months of the year. Rainfall is brought primarily by monsoon systems and tropical weather disturbances traversing the Philippine Area of Responsibility.

Climate data for Burauen, Leyte
| Month | Jan | Feb | Mar | Apr | May | Jun | Jul | Aug | Sep | Oct | Nov | Dec | Year |
|---|---|---|---|---|---|---|---|---|---|---|---|---|---|
| Mean daily maximum °C (°F) | 28 (82) | 28 (82) | 29 (84) | 30 (86) | 30 (86) | 29 (84) | 29 (84) | 29 (84) | 29 (84) | 29 (84) | 29 (84) | 28 (82) | 29 (84) |
| Mean daily minimum °C (°F) | 22 (72) | 22 (72) | 22 (72) | 23 (73) | 24 (75) | 25 (77) | 25 (77) | 25 (77) | 25 (77) | 24 (75) | 24 (75) | 23 (73) | 24 (75) |
| Average precipitation mm (inches) | 78 (3.1) | 57 (2.2) | 84 (3.3) | 79 (3.1) | 118 (4.6) | 181 (7.1) | 178 (7.0) | 169 (6.7) | 172 (6.8) | 180 (7.1) | 174 (6.9) | 128 (5.0) | 1,598 (62.9) |
| Average rainy days | 16.7 | 13.8 | 17.3 | 18.5 | 23.2 | 26.5 | 27.1 | 26.0 | 26.4 | 27.5 | 24.6 | 21.0 | 268.6 |
Source: Meteoblue

== Demographics ==
Population census of Burauen

| Year | Pop. | ±% p.a. |
|---|---|---|
| 1903 | 18,197 | — |
| 1918 | 25,647 | +2.31% |
| 1939 | 33,505 | +1.28% |
| 1948 | 37,252 | +1.18% |
| 1960 | 31,807 | −1.31% |
| 1970 | 42,954 | +3.05% |
| 1975 | 47,152 | +1.89% |
| 1980 | 48,053 | +0.38% |

| Year | Pop. | ±% p.a. |
|---|---|---|
| 1990 | 46,029 | −0.43% |
| 1995 | 50,751 | +1.85% |
| 2000 | 47,180 | −1.55% |
| 2007 | 48,606 | +0.41% |
| 2010 | 48,853 | +0.18% |
| 2015 | 52,732 | +1.47% |
| 2020 | 52,511 | −0.09% |
| 2024 | 54,635 | +0.96% |

Source: Philippine Statistics Authority

The population of Burauen, Leyte, Philippines, was recorded at 54,635 in the 2024 Census of Population (2024 POPCEN) conducted by the Philippine Statistics Authority (PSA). This represented an increase of 2,124 persons from the 2020 census population of 52,511. The municipality accounted for approximately 3.0% of the total population of Leyte province.

Of the 52,359 household population in Burauen, Leyte, 26,930 (51.4%) were males while 25,429 (48.6%) were females. By age group, 17,593 (33.6%) were under 15 years of age (young dependents). On the other hand, persons aged 15 to 64 years (working-age or economically active population) totaled to 31,650 (60.4%) while those in age groups 65 years and over (old dependents) comprised the remaining 3,116 (6.0%). In 2015, persons aged 0 to 14 years, 15 to 64 years, and 65 years and over accounted for 34.3 percent, 60.2 percent, and 5.5 percent, respectively, of the household.

Moreover, there were more males (47.5%) than females (43.4%) among the 0 to 59 age group. However, among the older age group (60 years and over), females (5.2%) outnumbered the males (3.9%). The same trend was also observed in 2015.

=== Sex ratio stands at 106 males per 100 females ===
The sex ratio in Burauen, Leyte was computed at 106 in 2020. This means that there were 106 males for every 100 females. The sex ratio in 2015 was also computed at 106 males per 100 females.

In 2020, children aged below 15 years had a sex ratio of 108 males per 100 females. On the other hand, those aged 15 to 64 years had a sex ratio of 110 males per 100 females. Moreover, among those aged 65 years and over, the sex ratio was 65 males per 100 females. This depicts a longer life expectancy among females than males or a higher mortality rate among males than females in the older age groups.

=== There were more males than females in children under five years old ===
The sex ratio for children under five years old in 2020 was 110 males per 100 females, higher than the 2015 ratio of 109 males per 100 females. Additionally, children under five comprised 11.3 percent (5,910 persons) of the household population in 2020, a decrease from 11.7 percent (6,190 persons) in 2015.

=== Median age measures at 23.0 years ===
The median age of Burauen, Leyte household population continues to increase during the past three censuses. In 2020, the median age was computed at 23.0 years, which means that half of the household population was younger than 23.0 years, while the other half is older than 23.0 years. This is higher than the median ages of 22.2 and 21.7 years that was posted in 2015 and 2010, respectively.

=== Dependency ratio decreases to 65 dependents per 100 persons in the working-age group ===
The 2020 overall dependency ratio of Burauen, Leyte was computed at 65, which indicates that for every 100 working-age or economically active population, there were about 65 dependents (55 young dependents and 10 old dependents). This is lower than the dependency ratio in 2015, which was recorded at 66 dependents per 100 working-age population (57 young dependents and 9 old dependents).

=== Two in every five household population are of school age ===
In 2020, the school-age population (5 to 24 years old) accounted for 21,481 (41.0%) of the household population which is lower compared to the 22,422 (42.5%) school-age population that was reported in 2015. Moreover, there were more males (51.6%) than females (48.4%) of the school-age population in 2020.

=== Senior citizens accounts for 9.1 percent of the household population ===
In Burauen, Leyte, people aged 60 years old and over are regarded as senior citizens, made up 9.1 percent (4,784 persons) of the household population in 2020, lower than the 8.0 percent (4,221 persons) recorded in 2015. There were more females (57.0%) than males (43.0%) among the senior citizens in 2020. The same trend was observed in 2015.

=== Nearly half of the female population are of reproductive age ===
Women of reproductive age (15 to 49 years old) totaled to 12,198 or 48.0 percent of the 25,429 female household population in 2020. This percentage was lower compared to the 48.8 percent or 12,492 females posted in 2015.In 2020, the school-age population (5 to 24 years old) accounted for 21,481 (41.0%) of the household population which is lower compared to the 22,422 (42.5%) school-age population that was reported in 2015. Moreover, there were more males (51.6%) than females (48.4%) of the school-age population in 2020.

=== Aging index is higher by 3.9 percentage points from 23.3 in 2015 to 27.2 in 2020 ===
In Burauen, Leyte, the aging index or the proportion of persons aged 60 years and over per 100 persons under the age of 15 years was computed at 27.2 percent in 2020. This means that there is about one (1) person aged 60 years and over for every four (4) children under 15 years old.

== Religion ==
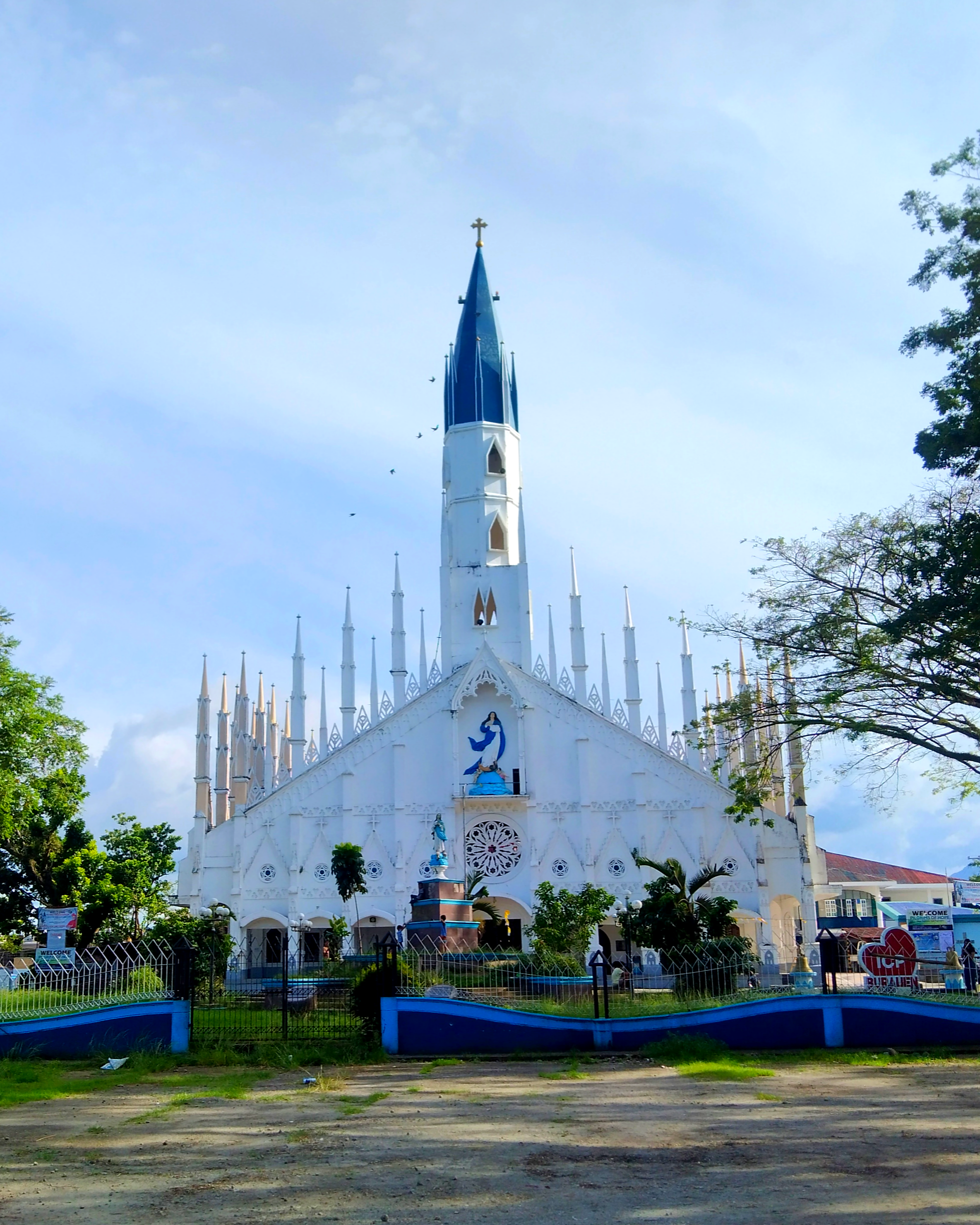
Immaculate Conception Parish of Burauen

Religion in Burauen is predominantly Christian, with Roman Catholicism serving as the largest religious affiliation in the municipality. The religious landscape of Burauen reflects the broader pattern of the province of Leyte, where Catholicism has historically been the dominant faith since the Spanish colonial era.

=== Roman Catholicism ===
Roman Catholicism was introduced to Burauen during the Spanish colonial period through the missionary activities of Jesuit priests in the late 16th century. Historical records indicate that Jesuit missionaries established a mission settlement in Burauen around 1595, using the town as a base for the Christianization of central Leyte.

The municipality's principal Catholic institution is the Our Lady of the Immaculate Conception Parish Church, one of the oldest churches in the interior of Leyte. The parish was founded in 1600 under Jesuit administration before later being transferred to the Augustinians following the expulsion of the Jesuits in 1768.

Catholic traditions and religious festivities remain central to local culture in Burauen, including annual patronal feasts, Marian devotions, Holy Week observances, and community fiestas associated with barangay chapels and patron saints.

=== Other Christian denominations ===
Aside from Roman Catholics, Burauen is home to several Protestant and independent Christian groups, including adherents of Iglesia ni Cristo, Baptist churches, Seventh-day Adventists, Mormons, and other evangelical denominations.

These religious groups expanded in the municipality during the American colonial period and the post-war era, following the broader spread of Protestant and independent churches throughout Eastern Visayas.

=== Religious influence on local culture ===
Religion continues to play an important role in the social and cultural life of Burauen. Religious institutions frequently participate in civic celebrations, educational programs, charitable activities, and disaster response initiatives. Catholic churches and chapels throughout the municipality also serve as important historical landmarks and community gathering centers.

== Economy ==
Poverty incidence of Burauen (%)

Source: Philippine Statistics Authority

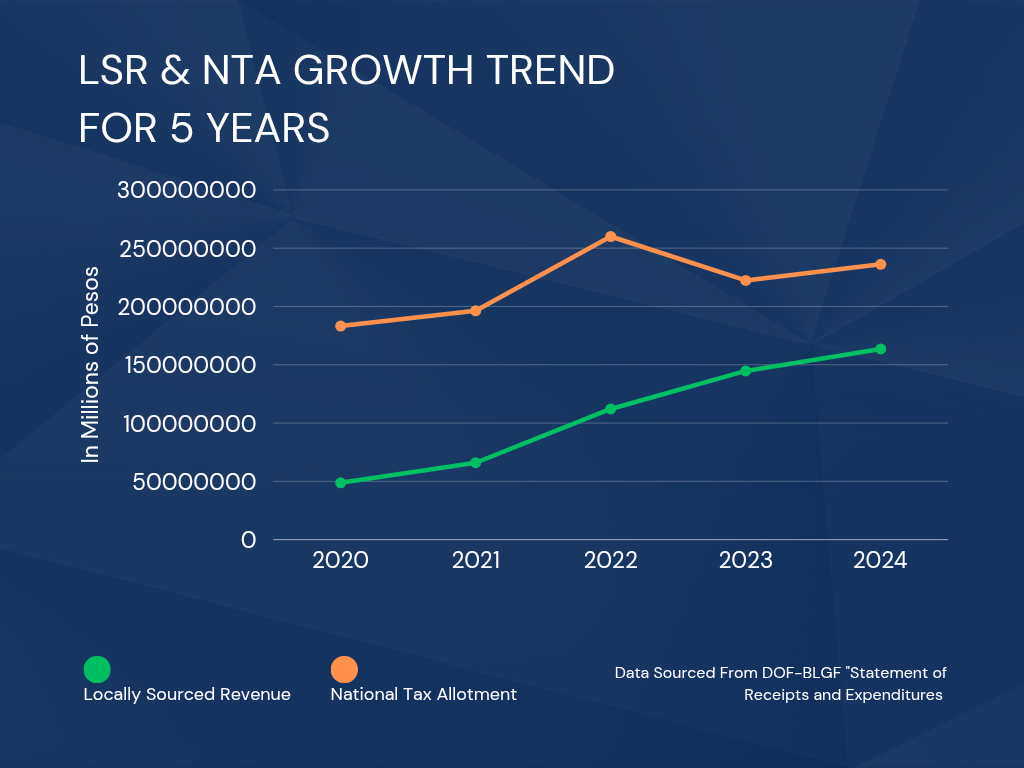
The chart represents Burauen, Leyte's LSR & NTA Growth Trend for the Last 5 Consecutive years.

The economy of Burauen is primarily driven by agriculture, commerce, education, healthcare services and emerging local industries. Located in the central part of Leyte in Eastern Visayas, the municipality serves as a major inland economic center in the province due to its strategic location, growing population and expanding institutional infrastructure.

=== Agriculture ===
Agriculture remains the backbone of Burauen's economy. The municipality is known for extensive rice and coconut production, which occupy a significant portion of its agricultural lands. Other major crops include corn, root crops, vegetables, bananas and abaca. Livestock and poultry farming also contribute to local economic activity, particularly in rural upland barangays.

Burauen is recognized as one of the major rice-producing municipalities in Leyte, supported by fertile plains and irrigation systems supplied by surrounding river networks and watersheds. Coconut farming likewise remains an important source of livelihood and raw materials for copra production and other coconut-based products.

=== Commerce and Trade ===
The municipality functions as a commercial hub for neighboring interior towns of Leyte. Retail trade, public markets, transportation services, small enterprises and food establishments form an essential part of the local economy. The redevelopment and modernization of the Burauen Public Market and Commercial Complex further strengthened local commerce and improved business activity within the town center.

Micro, small and medium enterprises (MSMEs) continue to expand in sectors such as construction supplies, agricultural trading, food processing, hardware, transportation and consumer goods.

=== Education Sector ===
Education has become one of the fastest-growing sectors in Burauen's Economy. The establishment and expansion of Burauen Community College significantly increased economic activity by attracting students from various municipalities across Eastern Visayas. The institution contributed to the growth of boarding houses, restaurants, transportation services, printing shops and other student-oriented businesses.

The municipality has also developed into an educational center in central Leyte due to the presence of several public and private educational institutions.

=== Healthcare and Medical Services ===
The opening of the Burauen Health and Wellness Center enhanced the municipality's healthcare economy by providing advanced medical services such as dialysis treatment, laboratory facilities, diagnostic services and outpatient care. The expansion of healthcare infrastructure generated employment opportunities for medical professionals and support personnel while reducing the need for residents to travel to larger cities for specialized services.

Healthcare-related investments also stimulated demand for pharmacies, medical supply businesses, food services and residential accommodations.

=== Infrastructure and Public Investments ===
Infrastructure development has played major role in the municipality's economic growth. Public investments in road improvements, drainage systems, public buildings, slaughterhouse facilities, cold storage infrastructure and sanitation projects, improved connectivity and business efficiency.

Among the notable infrastructure initiatives was the construction of one of the first centralized wastewater treatment facilities for a public market in Eastern Visayas Region, aimed at improving environmental sustainability and sanitation management.

The municipality also benefited from increased local government investments funded through locally generated revenues and national government allocations.

=== Local Revenue and Fiscal Performance ===
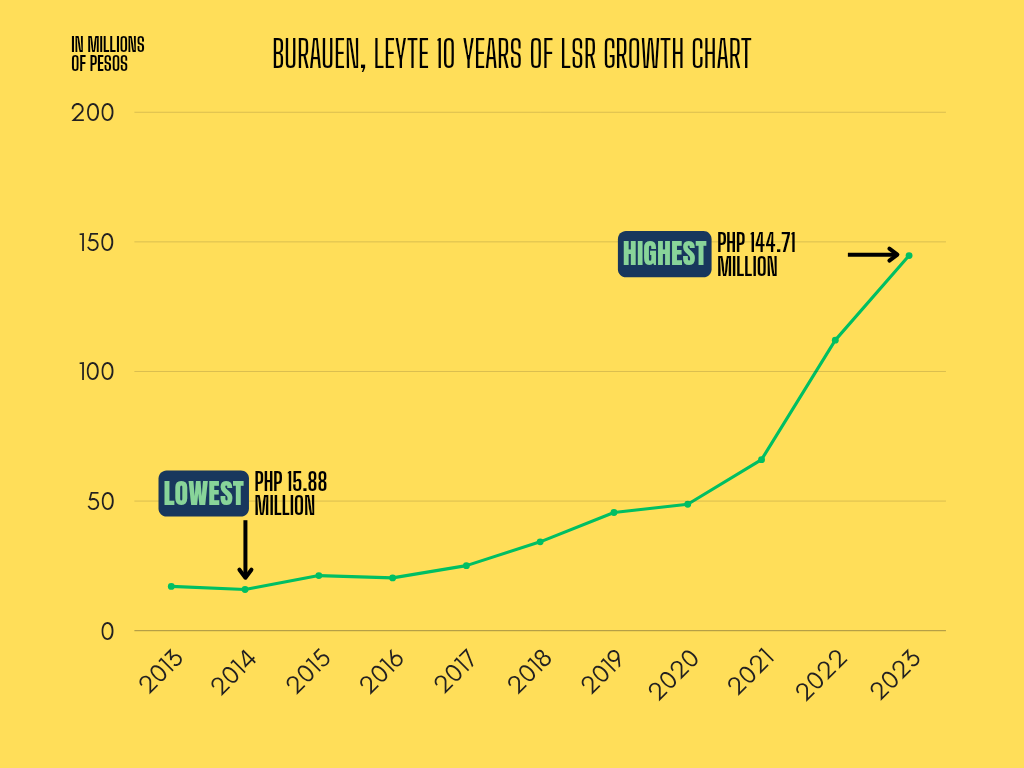
Chart visualizing the growth of Burauen's LSR for 10 years.

Burauen has been recognized for its relatively strong locally sourced revenue generation compared to many municipalities in Eastern Visayas. Local income is derived from business taxes, real property taxes, service fees, water system, market operation and other municipal income generating peograms and services.

The municipality's improving fiscal capacity enabled the implementation of large-scale development projects in education, healthcare, and public infrastructures. Economic diversification and rising commercial activity contributed to reduced dependence on national government transfers relative to several neighboring municipalities.

=== Tourism and Emerging Industries ===
Tourism contributes modestly to the local economy through natural attractions, cultural events, resorts, lakes, rivers, waterfall and other eco-tourism destinations located within the municipality. Local festivals and religious activities also support tourism-related commerce.

Emerging sectors include hospitality services, digital services, agri-processing, and logistics-related businesses that support agricultural distribution within Leyte.

=== CMCI - Cities and Municipalities Competitiveness Index ===
According to the Cities and Municipalities Competitiveness Index Report, Burauen has consistently been one of the top performers in the region and in the province since the ranking started in 2013. The town has been the top performer in Leyte for the years of 2017, 2018, 2019, and 2021. Making it the only town in the province to hold the top spot for 3 consecutive years and another one in the year 2021, making the total of 4 1st placements and consistently being in the top 10 since CMCI started in 2013.

=== Cities and municipalities competitiveness index ranking ===
The Department of Trade and Industry’s (DTI) Cities and Municipalities Competitiveness Index (CMCI) has consistently recognized Burauen as one of the stronger-performing municipalities in Eastern Visayas, particularly among first-class municipalities. The CMCI evaluates local government units based on five major pillars: Economic Dynamism, Government Efficiency, Infrastructure, Resiliency, and Innovation.

According to CMCI records and municipal performance summaries, Burauen emerged as the top-performing municipality in Leyte Province and among the leading first-class municipalities in Eastern Visayas several times since the rankings began in 2013. The municipality recorded four first-place provincial finishes . This made Burauen the only municipality in Leyte to achieve three consecutive CMCI top placements from 2017 to 2019, before reclaiming the top spot again in 2021.

In terms of regional competitiveness among first- and second-class municipalities in Eastern Visayas, Burauen has generally remained within the upper tier for much of the past decade. Its strongest national showing came in 2017, when it ranked 93rd nationally among first- and second-class municipalities in the Philippines.

The municipality’s competitiveness performance has often been associated with improvements in local governance, infrastructure expansion, public health investments, environmental programs, and institutional development. Burauen has also been recognized for maintaining competitiveness despite Eastern Visayas traditionally lagging behind more industrialized Philippine regions in national economic rankings.

Burauen
- Interactive map of Burauen

Competitiveness index
  - CMCI 2024: Provincial Rank - 7th National Rank - 399th
  - CMCI 2023: Provincial Rank - 2nd National Rank - 212th
  - CMCI 2022: Provincial Rank - 2nd National Rank - 97th
  - CMCI 2021: Provincial Rank - 1st National Rank - 173rd
  - CMCI 2020: Provincial Rank - 2nd National Rank - 219th
  - CMCI 2019: Provincial Rank - 1st National Rank - 186th
  - CMCI 2018: Provincial Rank - 1st National Rank - 303rd
  - CMCI 2017: Provincial Rank - 1st National Rank - 93rd
  - CMCI 2016: Provincial Rank - 6th National Rank - 414th

== Environment, sanitation, and natural resources ==
The municipality of Burauen is known for its mountainous landscape, geothermal features, freshwater lakes, forest ecosystems, and protected natural areas. Much of the municipality’s environmental resources are concentrated in the upland barangays surrounding the Mahagnao Volcano Natural Park, a protected area shared with the neighboring municipality of La Paz. The park contains volcanic lakes, hot springs, forests, waterfalls, and diverse flora and fauna, making it one of Eastern Visayas’ important ecological and ecotourism sites.

=== Natural resources ===
Burauen possesses significant natural resources including forest reserves, freshwater systems, geothermal features, and agricultural lands. The municipality is often associated with springs and upland watersheds that contribute to the water supply and ecological balance of central Leyte. The area surrounding Mahagnao contains volcanic terrain with natural hot springs, fumaroles, and lakes formed through volcanic activity.

The municipality’s most prominent protected area is the Mahagnao Volcano Natural Park, which covers portions of Burauen and La Paz. The protected landscape includes Lake Mahagnao and Lake Malagsum, both of which are recognized for their ecological and tourism value. The park also hosts dipterocarp forests and endemic wildlife species.

Studies conducted on Lake Mahagnao identified diverse aquatic organisms and primary producers within the lake ecosystem. Research has also documented the lake’s hydrological and hydrobiological characteristics, highlighting its importance as a freshwater ecosystem in Leyte.

The forests within Mahagnao Volcano Natural Park serve as watershed areas and biodiversity habitats. In 2022, the Department of Environment and Natural Resources (DENR) announced reforestation efforts covering over 100 hectares of previously converted agricultural land within the protected area to restore indigenous tree cover and strengthen conservation measures.

In 2025, faunal assessments conducted by the DENR and partner institutions documented endemic Philippine bulbul species within the protected park, further emphasizing the municipality’s ecological significance and biodiversity conservation role in Eastern Visayas.

==== Geothermal Energy Potential ====
The municipality of Burauen possesses significant geothermal potential due to its location within the geothermal-rich central highlands of Leyte Island, part of the Philippine segment of the Pacific Ring of Fire. Much of this potential is associated with the nearby Tongonan geothermal system, one of the largest and most productive geothermal fields in the Philippines.

Exploration drilling in Burauen began during the expansion of the Philippine geothermal program in the 1970s and intensified in the early 2000s as new geothermal prospects were identified around Mt. Lobi and the Mahagnao volcanic area. The municipality’s volcanic geology, hydrothermal activity, and proximity to the Tongonan geothermal field made it a priority exploration zone.

One of the most significant drilling initiatives in Burauen was the Central Leyte Geothermal Project (CLGP). In 2003, PNOC-Energy Development Corporation announced the drilling of exploratory wells in Mt. Lobi within Burauen to evaluate additional geothermal reserves. The project aimed to expand Leyte’s geothermal generating capacity by identifying new commercially viable steam reservoirs.

=== Environment and conservation ===
Environmental conservation programs in Burauen are centered on the protection of forest ecosystems, watershed rehabilitation, and sustainable ecotourism. Local community organizations and government agencies have collaborated in maintaining ecotourism activities and environmental protection initiatives within Mahagnao Volcano Natural Park.

The municipality has promoted sustainable tourism development through nature-based attractions such as forest trails, hot springs, waterfalls, and volcanic lakes. Conservation activities within the protected area include forest rehabilitation, biodiversity monitoring, and ecotourism management in coordination with the Protected Area Management Office (PAMO) and the DENR.

=== Sanitation and waste management ===
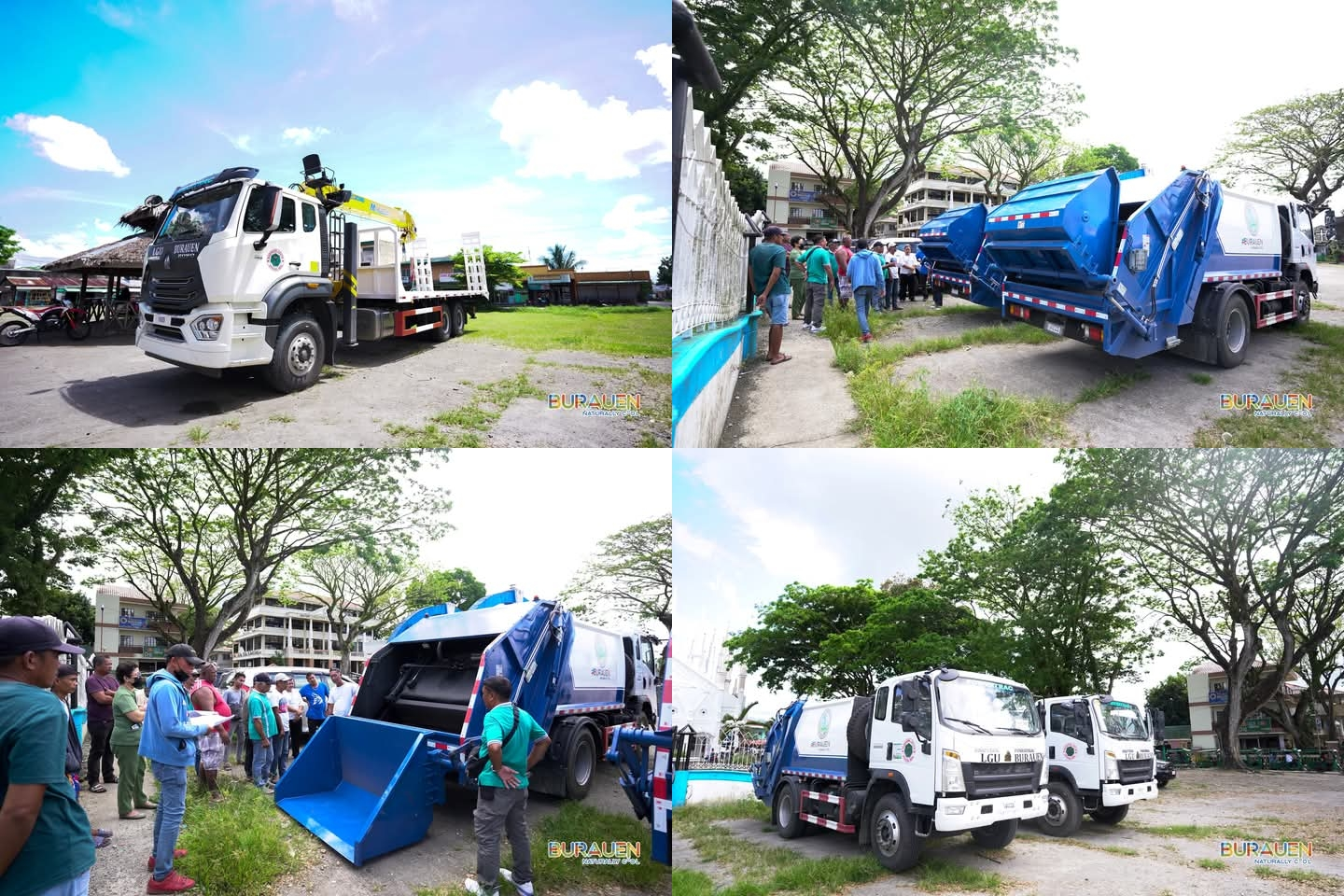
Burauen Garbage Collector Trucks

In compliance with Republic Act No. 9003, or the Ecological Solid Waste Management Act of 2000, the local government established a municipal sanitary landfill site in Barangay Gamay. The sanitary landfill occupies approximately 1.20 hectares and was developed according to national environmental standards for solid waste disposal. The facility received an Environmental Compliance Certificate from the Environmental Management Bureau of the Department of Environment and Natural Resources and commenced operations in April 2015.

Drainage improvements and environmental sanitation projects have also accompanied infrastructure development in the municipality, particularly in tourism and urban growth areas. Road development projects leading to upland tourism and protected areas included the construction of drainage canals intended to improve environmental management and accessibility.

== Infrastructure ==
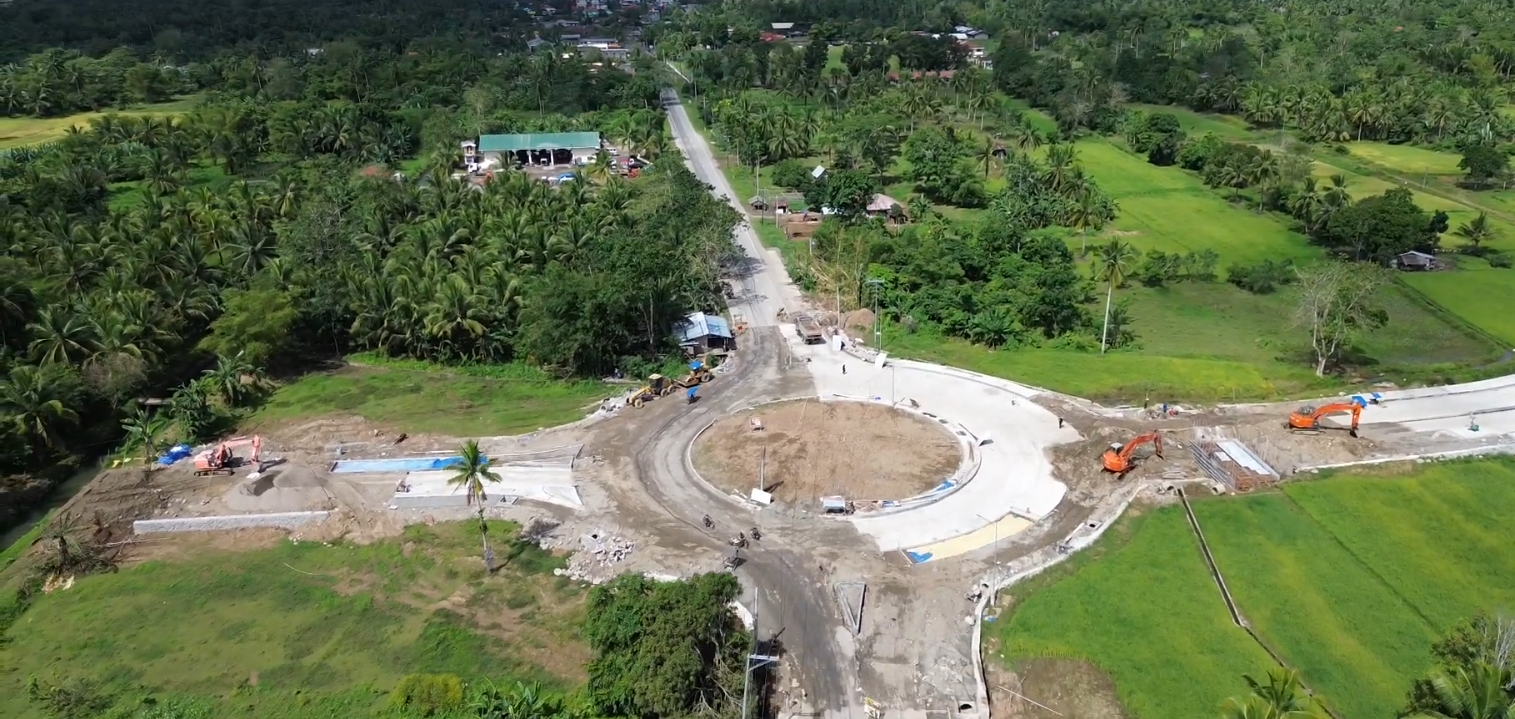
An aerial image of Burauen Bypass Road Rotonda facing in the direction of Burauen Town Proper

According to the 2019 Cities and Municipalities Competitiveness Index, Burauen posted the highest score in the province and second in the region in terms of infrastructure quality and development.

The town's roadways are mostly paved, with a few remaining upland and lowland areas unpaved due to several factors, such as land disputes and budgetary constraints. Almost each barangay has adequate public infrastructure, including covered public basketball courts that also serve as evacuation centers during calamities.

== Tourism ==
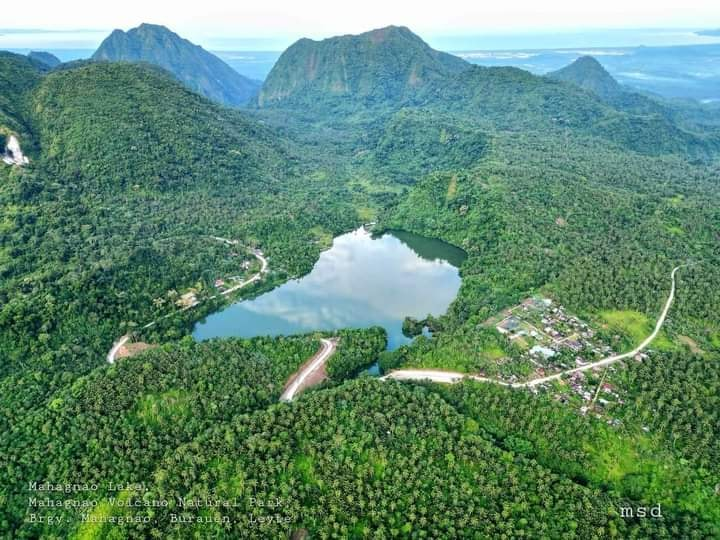
Image of Mahagnao lake and Barangay Mahagnao located inside Mahagnao Volcano Natural Park

Tourism in Burauen is centered on ecotourism, natural parks, geothermal attractions, lakes, waterfalls, and upland forest ecosystems. Known as the “Spring Capital of Leyte” due to its abundant freshwater resources, the municipality has increasingly promoted sustainable and community-based tourism through the Burauen Ecotourism and Sustainable Tourism (BEST) project.

The municipality’s primary tourism destination is the Mahagnao Volcano Natural Park, a protected area proclaimed as a national park in 1937 and later designated as a protected landscape under Philippine environmental laws. The park spans approximately 635 hectares across the municipalities of Burauen and La Paz.

=== Mahagnao Volcano Natural Park ===
The Mahagnao Volcano Natural Park is the municipality’s most visited natural attraction. Located approximately 18 kilometers from the town center and around 860 meters above sea level, the park features volcanic lakes, forests, hot springs, mud pools, waterfalls, and hiking trails.

The park surrounds the dormant but potentially active Mahagnao Volcano, which contains active geothermal and thermal features. Hiking trails within the park lead to viewpoints overlooking Lake Mahagnao and Lake Malagsum.

Among the park’s major attractions are:

==== Mahagnao Volcano ====
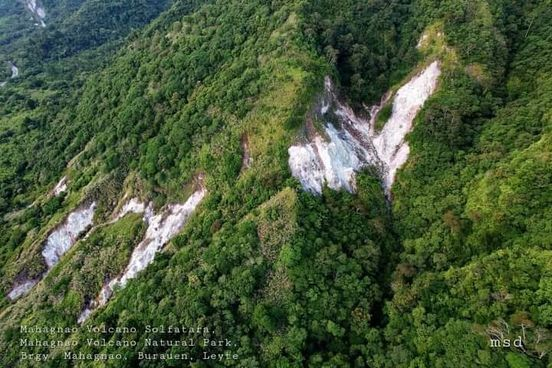
Mahagnao Volcano Crater

Mahagnao Volcano is a dormant volcano located in Barangay Mahagnao, more than 30 km away from the town proper. Although the volcano has been inactive, it is still classified as potentially active due to the active thermal features of the mountain. Tourist are allowed to hike on its peak.

==== Mahagnao Lake ====
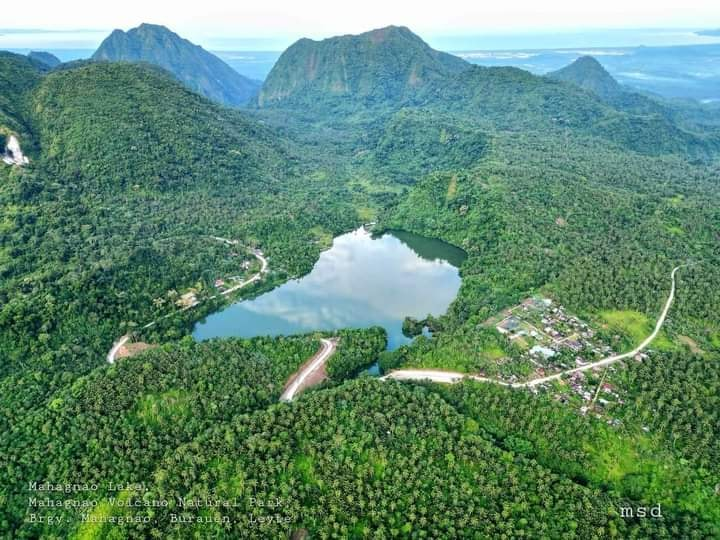
Image of Mahagnao lake and Barangay Mahagnao located inside Mahagnao Volcano Natural Park

This lake serves as the main source of marine products for the locals and also the center of its tourism activities. Several resorts owned privately or by community associations are on the lakeshore.

==== Malagsum Lake ====
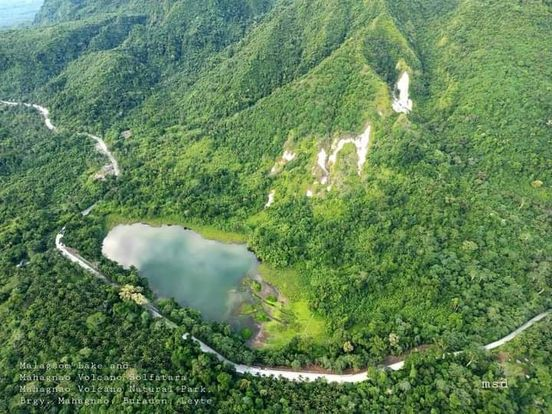
Malagsum Lake

This lake is smaller compared to the other one. It is a highly acidic lake which contains high level of sulfuric acid making it impossible for marine lives or some organisms to thrive. Except for the hundreds to thousands of wild docks making it as breeding ground or a home for migratory birds during migrating season.

==== Calor Hot Spring ====
A geothermal spring destination proposed for tourism development by the local government.

==== Tanguile Trail ====
A forest trekking route featuring bamboo groves and native dipterocarp trees.

==== Matigbao Lake ====
It is the smallest of the three lakes inside the park. But it is also the farthest and the most challenging to have a trek. Due to being isolated, the environment is quite different from what commonly seen in the rest of the park. There are numerous species of plants and insects thriving within the vicinity (such as dragonflies).

==== Calor Hotspring ====
The spring is just located at the southern foot of the volcano. It was a system of springs heated by an active thermal feature. Thus, creating a hot spring that merges to another system of spring creating a river of hot spring.

==== Guin-aniban Falls ====
The waterfall is located few kilometers on the southeast. It is the water from the Mahagnao lake which is passing to systems of rivers then merge before approaching on the mouth of the cliff creating a water fall that directly flow on the larger river called Marabong.

Camping activities were formally introduced in the park in 2024 as part of efforts to expand nature-based tourism offerings in Leyte.

=== Ecotourism Development ===
The local government of Burauen has pursued sustainable tourism initiatives in partnership with environmental advocates, tourism consultants, and community organizations. The BEST (Burauen Ecotourism and Sustainable Tourism) project was launched to promote conservation-based tourism and improve visitor facilities while protecting the municipality’s natural resources.

Infrastructure improvements have also been implemented to improve access to tourism destinations. In 2019, the Department of Public Works and Highways completed road concreting projects leading to Mahagnao Volcano Natural Park to support tourism growth and local transportation.

The area surrounding Mahagnao Volcano Natural Park and Mahagnao Lake has emerged as one of the growing ecotourism destinations in Eastern Visayas. Located in the upland forests of Burauen, the park is known for its volcanic lakes, hot springs, mossy forests, hiking trails, and cool climate. Several locally operated resorts, farm stays, and lakeside accommodations have developed around the area to support tourism and recreational activities.

Aside from the resorts surrounding Mahagnao Lake and Mahagnao Volcano Natural Park, several other inland mountain, spring, and farm resorts operate within the jurisdiction of Burauen. These resorts contribute to the municipality’s growing ecotourism and leisure industry, which forms part of the local government’s Burauen Eco-tourism and Sustainable Tourism (BEST) initiative.

=== Nature and Biodiversity ===
Burauen’s tourism sector is closely linked with environmental conservation and biodiversity protection. The forests surrounding Mahagnao contain endemic flora and fauna, including migratory birds and native wildlife species. The park has also been associated with wildlife conservation initiatives in Leyte, including reforestation and ecological protection efforts.

== Heritage and Historical Monuments ==
=== Norberto Romualdez Sr. park ===
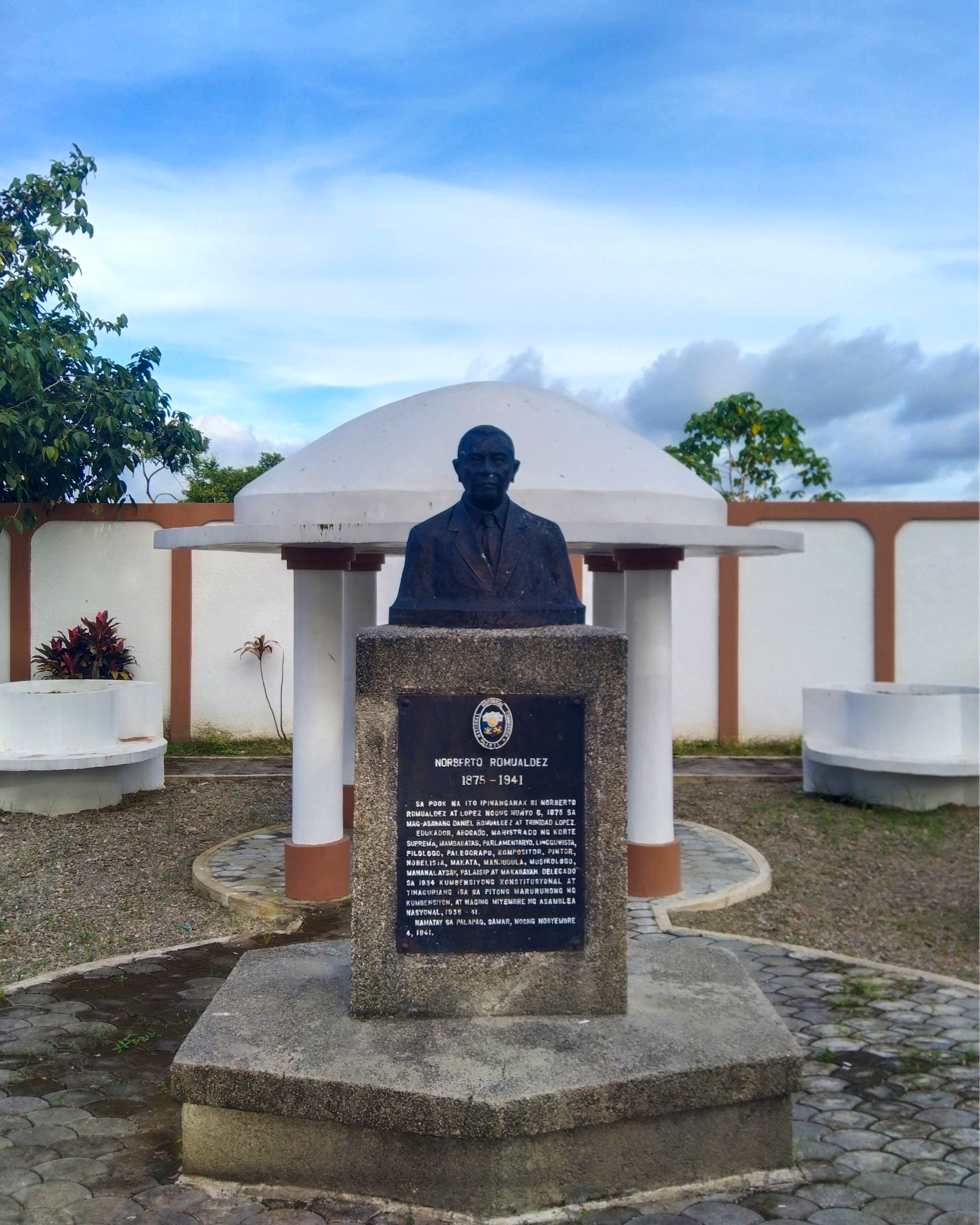
The Bust of Norberto Romualdez.

In his honor, June 6 every year was declared Norberto Romualdez Sr. Day.

On June 14, 2024, Mayor Juanito E. Renomeron inaugurated the restored 177-square meter park built in 1975, beside the 1600 Our Lady of the Immaculate Conception Church along the corner of Santa Ana and Ave Maria Streets, the exact site of his 1800s ancestral house. It is named after Norberto Romualdez. It was first improved in 2022 with the assistance of the National Historical Commission of the Philippines assistance. Romualdez' monument with a 1975 NHCP installed marker stands as the centerpiece with pavilion, concrete benches and a path walk.

== Healthcare ==
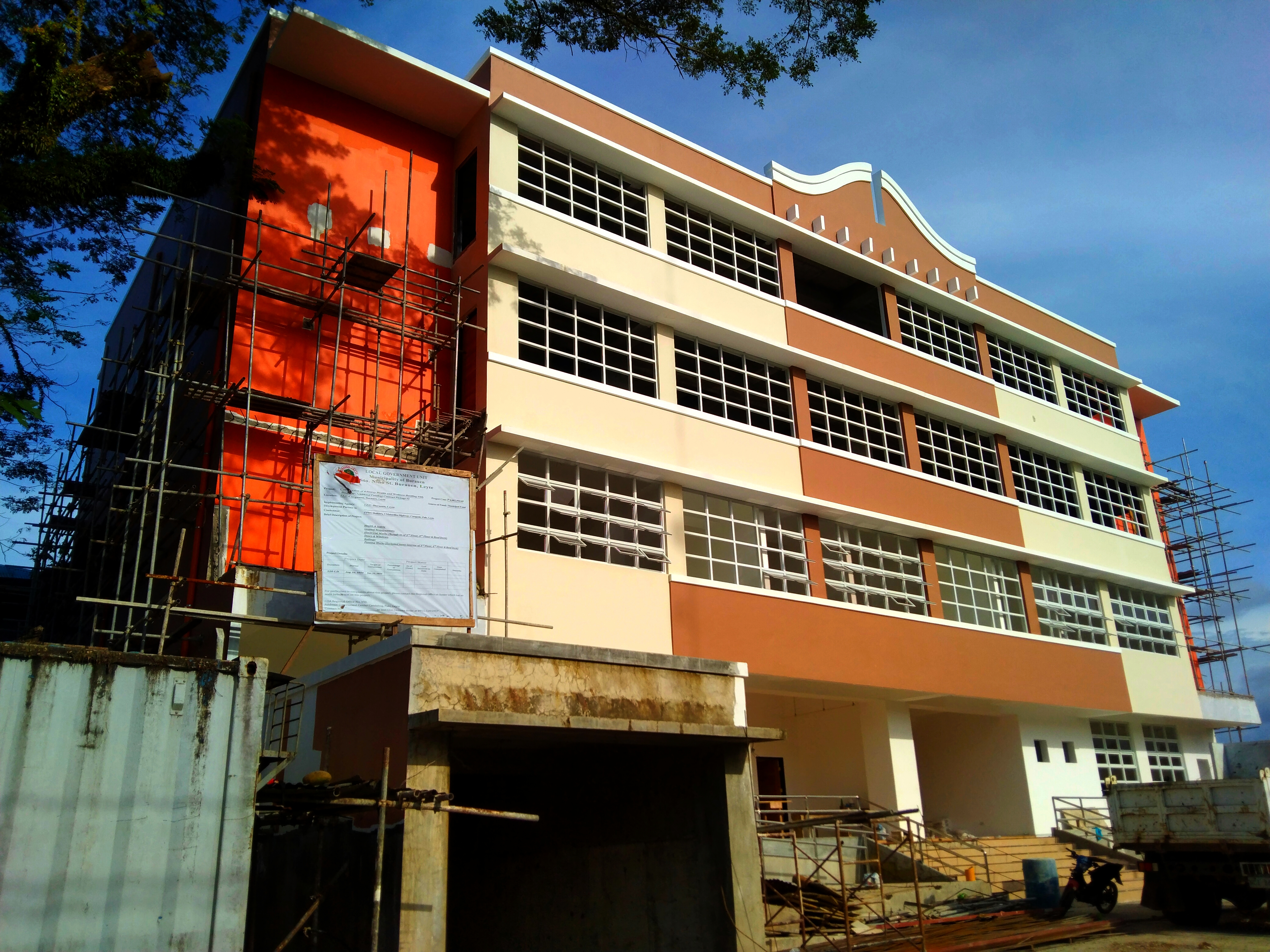
Burauen Health & Wellness Center (under construction as of January 2025)

Burauen healthcare needs are served by both the private and government owned health institutions.

- Burauen District Hospital (managed by the Provincial Government of Leyte)
- Burauen Rural Heath Unit (managed by the LGU of Burauen)

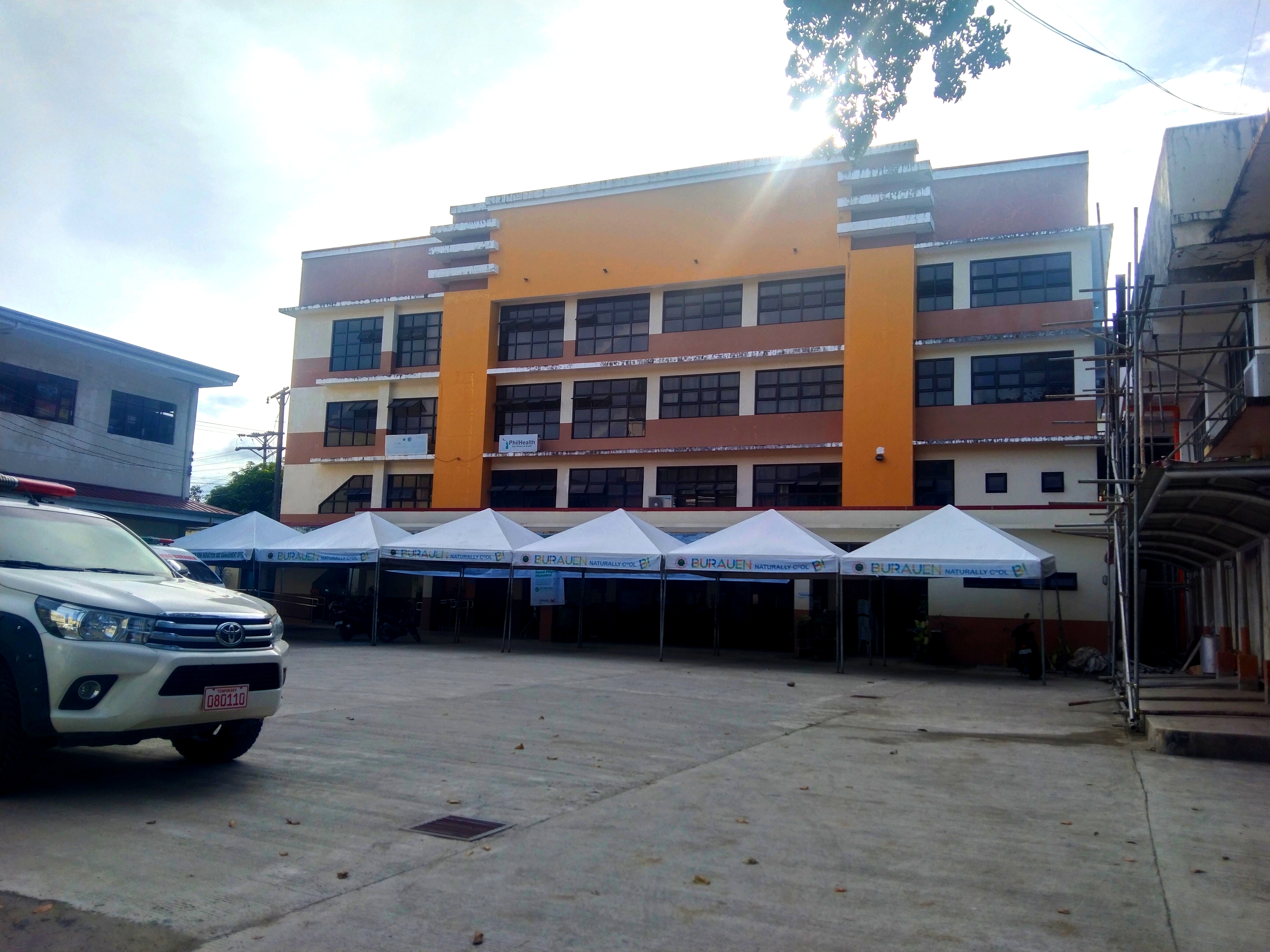
Rural Heath Unit Building of Burauen

- Barangay Health Centers (with presence in each barangays of Burauen)
- Burauen Health and Wellness Hospital (Underconstruction as of August 2024 funded by LGU)

While there are also several Private health facilities that catering Burawanons and nearby towns scattered all over the Poblacion.

== Education ==
Burauen's educational institutions is one of the largest when it comes to the size of enrollment and the teacher to student ratio. The town is served by both public and private educational institutions.

=== Tertiary ===
- EVSU-Burauen Campus
- Burauen Community College
- TESDA Burauen (Vocational)

=== Secondary ===
- Burauen Comprehensive National Highschool (BCNHS)
- Burauen National Highschool (BNHS)
- Hibunauan National Highschool
- Buraburon National Highschool
- Armasen National Highschool

=== Primary ===
- Immaculate Conception Academy of Burauen Inc.
- Morningside School
- Leyte Samar Center for Change Foundation Inc.
- Saint Claire Child Development Center Burauen Leyte Inc.
- All of Burauen's 77 barangays have public primary schools. These schools are governed and shared by the town's three school districts, namely Burauen North, Burauen South, and Burauen East, under the supervision of DepEd Leyte Second Division.
