= La Paz, Leyte =

Municipality in the Philippines

La Paz
- Municipality
- Municipality of La Paz
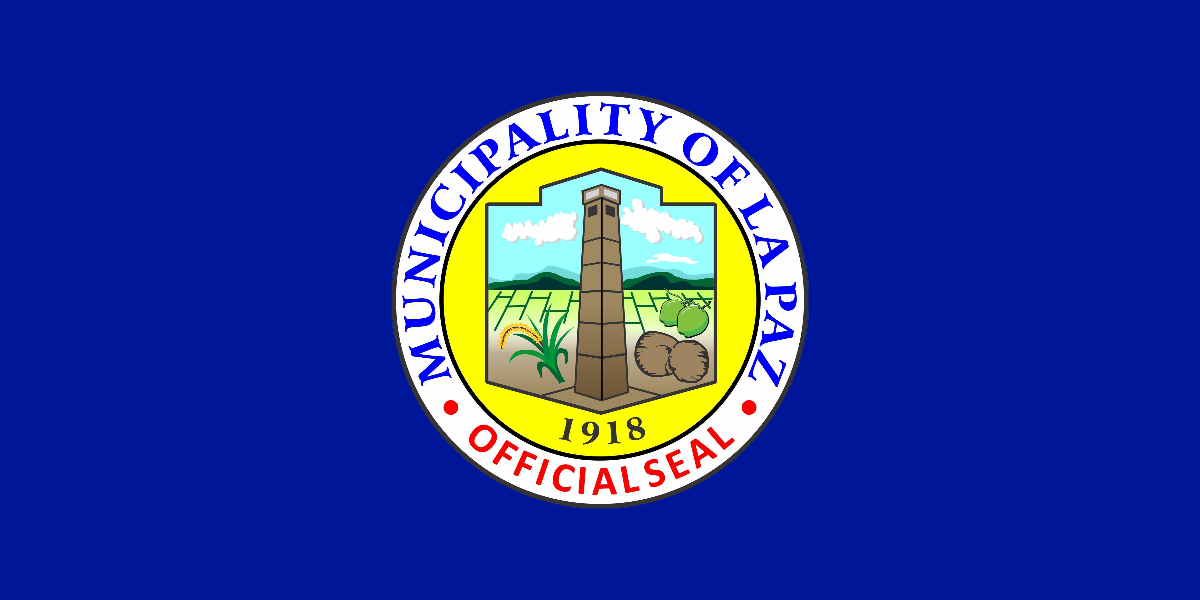
- Flag
- Nickname: The Talent Capital Of Eastern Visayas
- Motto: Dasig Lapaznon
- Interactive map of La Paz
- Location within the Philippines
- Coordinates: 10°53′28″N 124°57′26″E
- Country: Philippines
- Region: Eastern Visayas
- Province: Leyte
- District: 2nd district
- Barangays: 35 (see Barangays)

Government
  - Type: Sangguniang Bayan
  - Mayor: Joel C. Cinco
  - Vice Mayor: Araceli P. Go
  - Representative: Lolita T. Javier
  - Councilors: List: • Oscar G. Tan-Piengco; • Odell R. Baroña; • Relly F. Relano; • Alvin M. Tejome; • Jul C. Co; • Felicito B. Acompañado Jr.; • Marlou T. Marticio; • Danilo F. Gomez; DILG Masterlist of Officials
  - Electorate: 14,748 voters (2025)

Area
  - Total: 72.70 km^{2} (28.07 sq mi)
- Elevation: 144 m (472 ft)
- Highest elevation: 1,107 m (3,632 ft)
- Lowest elevation: 0 m (0 ft)

Population (2024 census)
  - Total: 19,797
  - Density: 272.3/km^{2} (705.3/sq mi)
  - Households: 5,094
- Demonym: La Paznon

Economy
  - Income class: 4th municipal income class
  - Poverty incidence: 29.66% (2023)
  - Revenue: ₱ 124 million (2024)
  - Assets: ₱ 373.5 million (2024)
  - Expenditure: ₱ 118.1 million (2024)
  - Liabilities: ₱ 84.74 million (2024)

Service provider
  - Electricity: Don Orestes Romualdez Electric Coperative (DORELCO)
- Time zone: UTC+8 (PST)
- ZIP code: 6508
- PSGC: 0803728000
- IDD : area code: +63 (0)53
- Native languages: Waray; Tagalog

La Paz (IPA: [lɐ 'pas]), officially the Municipality of La Paz (Waray: Bungto han La Paz; Tagalog: Bayan ng La Paz), is a municipality in the province of Leyte, Philippines. According to the 2024 census, it has a population of 19,797 people.

== History ==
In the 1870s, a sitio was formed, and a chapel was built there before 1886. The chapel was called "rosaryohan." Spanish missionaries visited this place to teach the natives the doctrine. However, the people had to go to Dulag for the Holy Week and days of obligation in order to attend mass.

Until then, the sitio was named Cabadyangan. When the question of official name came up, the people unanimously selected the name "La Paz", in honor of their patroness, Nuestra Señora De La Paz y Buen Viaje (Our Lady of Peace and Good Voyage).

The first hermano mayor was Victoriano Relano in 1908 when the first celebration of the fiesta in honor of the "Nuestra Señora de la Paz y Buen Viaje" was held.

In 1903, La Paz was made a barrio of Burauen. Capitan Estefanio de Paz was the first teniente del barrio. Three leaders went to Manila to petition to the central government to raise La Paz to the status of a municipality. Don Nicasio Martinez Vivero a Man from Tolosa, Leyte and a Educator in La Paz on that time was one of the Three leaders. With the help of provincial leaders, La Paz was declared a fourth class town in 1918. After the Township Declaration, Lapaznons gathered their First Elections, and they Elect Nicasio Vivero as the First Municipal President (Mayor) of La Paz.

On July 14, 1942, the Japanese forces invaded La Paz. A company of soldiers occupied the town with their garrison at the central school building. Because guerrillas constantly harassed them, the troops stayed in La Paz for only three weeks. However, one month later, more troops came. They constructed strong trenches around the school site. The Japanese abolished existing political parties and formed the "Kalibapi." They organized the local government and appointed a puppet mayor.

Atty. Pedro Kahano Palaña, Jr., The Son-In Law of Nicasio Vivero and also a Native of Tolosa, Leyte was the Puppet Mayor of La Paz, Leyte after he was Captured by the Japanese Soldiers together with Nicasio’s Two Children, Antonio Lubin and Maria Salud. Palaña served as a Mayor until the end of World War 2.

The Japanese tried to control the whole population of La Paz and organized the neighborhood associations in the poblacion as well as in the barrios. Schools were opened with emphasis on Nihongo, the Japanese language and the Asiatic ideologies.

Guerrillas infiltrated the town to learn about the enemy strength that was considered important information for the coming liberation. Many La Paznons risked their lives on these dangerous missions. In 1944, La Paz was liberated.

== Geography ==
=== Barangays ===
La Paz is politically subdivided into 35 barangays. Each barangay consists of puroks and some have sitios.

- Bagacay East
- Bagacay West
- Bongtod
- Bocawon
- Buracan
- Caabangan
- Cacao
- Cagngaran
- Calabnian
- Calaghusan
- Caltayan
- Canbañez
- Cogon
- Duyog
- Gimiranat East
- Gimiranat West
- Limba
- Lubi-lubi
- Luneta
- Mag-aso
- Moroboro
- Pansud
- Pawa
- Piliway
- Poblacion District 1
- Poblacion District 2
- Poblacion District 3
- Poblacion District 4
- Quiong
- Rizal
- San Victoray
- Santa Ana
- Santa Elena
- Tabang
- Tarugan

=== Climate ===
Climate data for La Paz, Leyte
Month	Jan	Feb	Mar	Apr	May	Jun	Jul	Aug	Sep	Oct	Nov	Dec	Year
Mean daily maximum °C (°F)	28 (82)	28 (82)	29 (84)	30 (86)	30 (86)	30 (86)	29 (84)	29 (84)	29 (84)	29 (84)	29 (84)	28 (82)	29 (84)
Mean daily minimum °C (°F)	22 (72)	22 (72)	22 (72)	23 (73)	25 (77)	25 (77)	25 (77)	25 (77)	25 (77)	24 (75)	24 (75)	23 (73)	24 (75)
Average precipitation mm (inches)	78 (3.1)	57 (2.2)	84 (3.3)	79 (3.1)	118 (4.6)	181 (7.1)	178 (7.0)	169 (6.7)	172 (6.8)	180 (7.1)	174 (6.9)	128 (5.0)	1,598 (62.9)
Average rainy days	16.7	13.8	17.3	18.5	23.2	26.5	27.1	26.0	26.4	27.5	24.6	21.0	268.6
Source: Meteoblue

== Demographics ==
Population census of La Paz

Year	Pop.	±% p.a.
1918	7,460	—
1939	12,970	+2.67%
1948	13,784	+0.68%
1960	15,388	+0.92%
1970	16,867	+0.92%
1975	16,863	−0.00%
1980	16,546	−0.38%
1990	14,311	−1.44%

Year	Pop.	±% p.a.
1995	16,366	+2.55%
2000	17,627	+1.60%
2007	18,650	+0.78%
2010	19,133	+0.93%
2015	19,998	+0.85%
2020	19,174	−0.88%
2024	19,797	+0.77%

Source: Philippine Statistics Authority

In the 2024 census, the population of La Paz was 19,797 people, with a density of 270 inhabitants per square kilometre or 700 inhabitants per square mile.

== Economy ==
Poverty incidence of La Paz (%)

Source: Philippine Statistics Authority

== Elected Officials ==
2025-2028 La Paz, Leyte Officials
Position	Name	Party
Mayor	Joel C. Cinco	Independent
Vice Mayor	Araceli P. Go	Lakas
Councilors	Oscar G. Tan-Piengco	Lakas
Councilors	Odell R. Baroña	Tingog
Councilors	Relly F. Relano	Tingog
Councilors	Alvin M. Tejome	NPC
Councilors	Jul C. Co	Independent
Councilors	Felicito B. Acompañado Jr.	Independent
Councilors	Marlou T. Marticio	Independent
Councilors	Danilo F. Gomez	Lakas
Ex Officio Municipal Council Members
ABC President	TBD	Nonpartisan
SK Federation President	Fionah Kimberlyn B. Acompañado	Nonpartisan
