= MacArthur, Leyte =

Municipality in Leyte, Philippines

MacArthur
- Municipality
- Municipality of MacArthur
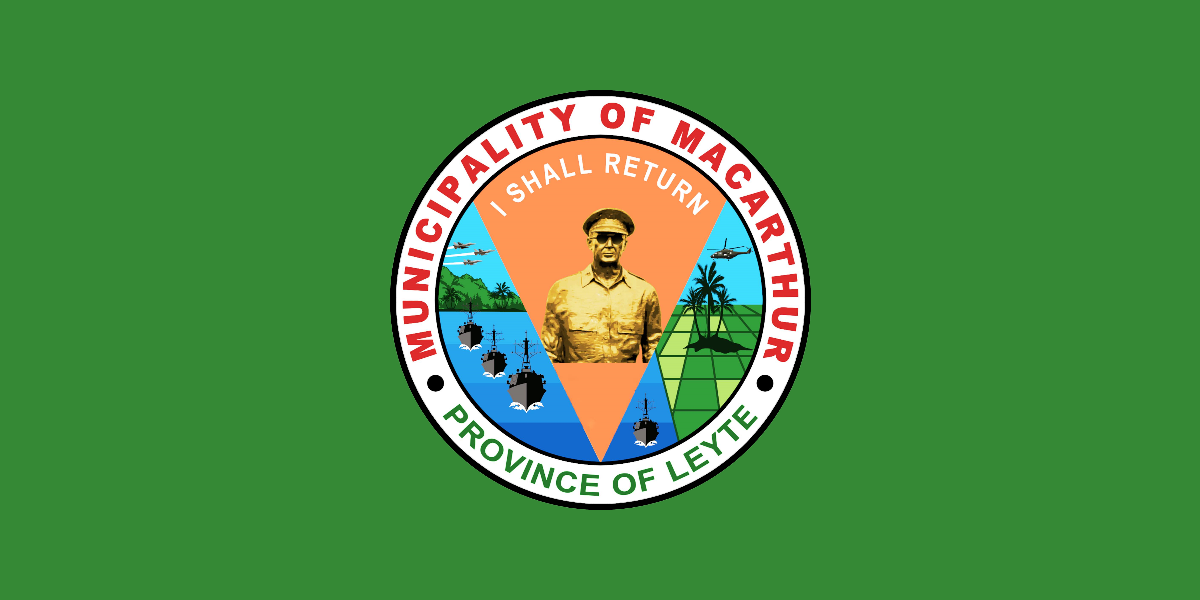
- Flag

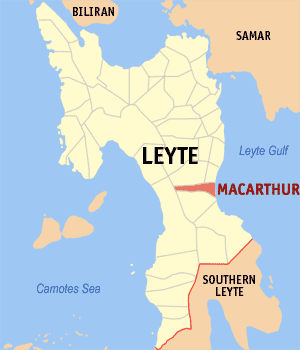
- Map of Leyte with MacArthur highlighted
- Interactive map of MacArthur
- Location within the Philippines
- Coordinates: 10°50′08″N 124°59′47″E
- Country: Philippines
- Region: Eastern Visayas
- Province: Leyte
- District: 2nd district
- Named for: Douglas MacArthur
- Barangays: 31 (see Barangays)

Government
  - Type: Sangguniang Bayan
  - Mayor: Rene R. Leria
  - Vice Mayor: Jesus A. Baranda
  - Representative: Lolita T. Javier
  - Councilors: List: • Josephine A. Piga; • Jesus A. Baranda; • Roden T. Belleza; • Danilo M. Ulbata; • Alberto H. Balaga; • Trina C. Burawis; • Leonides C. Ruba; • Dante B. Esplanada; DILG Masterlist of Officials
  - Electorate: 16,584 voters (2025)

Area
  - Total: 57.57 km^{2} (22.23 sq mi)
- Elevation: 125 m (410 ft)
- Highest elevation: 1,154 m (3,786 ft)
- Lowest elevation: 0 m (0 ft)

Population (2024 census)
  - Total: 22,256
  - Density: 386.6/km^{2} (1,001/sq mi)
  - Households: 5,574

Economy
  - Income class: 4th municipal income class
  - Poverty incidence: 27.1% (2023)
  - Revenue: ₱ 191.5 million (2024)
  - Assets: ₱ 230.7 million (2024)
  - Expenditure: ₱ 194.3 million (2024)
  - Liabilities: ₱ 24.24 million (2024)

Service provider
  - Electricity: Don Orestes Romualdez Electric Coperative (DORELCO)
- Time zone: UTC+8 (PST)
- ZIP code: 6509
- PSGC: 0803730000
- IDD : area code: +63 (0)53
- Native languages: Waray; Tagalog
- Website: www.macarthur-leyte.gov.ph

MacArthur (IPA: [mək 'ɑːrθər]), officially the Municipality of MacArthur (Waray: Bungto han MacArthur; Tagalog: Bayan ng MacArthur), is a municipality in the province of Leyte, Philippines. According to the 2024 census, it has a population of 22,256 people.

== History ==
The name MacArthur can be traced back to the liberation of the Philippines from the hands of the Japanese forces. As an expression of gratitude, six years after American general Douglas MacArthur landed at the Leyte Beach, the Leyteños named the town after the American general. This occurred after the lobbying efforts of Daniel Romualdez, then Congressman of the First District of Leyte.

In the latter part of 19th century, MacArthur was a flourishing village called Bagacay, named after a bamboo species, because of the abundance of the plant in the locality. Its first inhabitants were the families of Gabion, Matol, Echavez, Moquia, Jervoso and Galo who came from the neighboring towns of Abuyog, Tolosa, Tanauan and Burauen. Abuyog was its mother town.

The name Bagacay was then changed to Tarragona by a parish priest of Abuyog, Friar Bernardo Tapiol, who choose the name in honor of his native city in Spain. Sometime in 1898, Tarragona became an independent town with Anastacio Jervoso as Captain, the chief executive. That was when the Spanish government changed hands with the short-lived Philippine Republic. Leyte was then under the governorship of Gen. Mojica, Military Governor of Leyte. The local government, however, ended with the short-lived Philippine Republic, returning to its former status as a barrio.

With the outbreak of the Second World War, Senator Jose Veloso proclaimed Tarragona as a municipality with Antonio Matoza as Mayor, Fabian Pantin as Vice-Mayor, Calixta Matoza as Municipal Secretary, Alejandro Nuevas as Municipal Treasurer, and Marciano Lumbre as Chief of Police. The municipality was then composed of the following barrios; Osmeña, Capudlosan, Causwagan, Pongon, Danao, Casuntingan, Tuyo, San Isidro, Maya, Pinocawan, Batug, Kiling, Palale, Liwayway, Burabod, Gen. Luna, Calzada, Bugho, Manarog, Pondoc and Tin-awan.

When the American forces arrived in 1944, the municipality collapsed and returned to its being a barrio. The people re-petitioned President Sergio Osmeña to make Tarragona as a municipality again, but it did not materialize. In 1947, the people organized the "Barrio Tarragona for Regular Town League." After the national elections in 1949, Daniel Z. Romualdez sponsored House Bill 141 creating the municipality of MacArthur with the seat of the municipal government at Tarragona. It was vetoed by then President Elpidio Quirino. Later, a follow-up was made by Congressman Romualdez and Governor Catalina Landia. Finally, the President issued Executive Order No. 324, which created the Municipality of MacArthur, Leyte on June 17, 1950.

The Municipality is composed of 31 barangays.

== Geography ==
=== Barangays ===
MacArthur is politically subdivided into 31 barangays. Each barangay consists of puroks and some have sitios.

- Batug
- Burabod
- Capudlosan
- Casuntingan
- Causwagan
- Danao
- General Luna
- Kiling
- Lanawan
- Liwayway
- Maya
- Oguisan
- Osmeña
- Palale 1
- Palale 2
- Poblacion District 1
- Poblacion District 2
- Poblacion District 3
- Pongon
- Quezon
- Romualdez
- Salvacion
- San Antonio
- San Isidro
- San Pedro
- San Vicente
- Santa Isabel
- Tin-awan
- Tuyo
- Doña Josefa
- Villa Imelda

=== Climate ===
Climate data for MacArthur, Leyte
Month	Jan	Feb	Mar	Apr	May	Jun	Jul	Aug	Sep	Oct	Nov	Dec	Year
Mean daily maximum °C (°F)	28 (82)	29 (84)	29 (84)	30 (86)	30 (86)	30 (86)	29 (84)	29 (84)	29 (84)	29 (84)	29 (84)	29 (84)	29 (84)
Mean daily minimum °C (°F)	22 (72)	22 (72)	22 (72)	23 (73)	25 (77)	25 (77)	25 (77)	25 (77)	25 (77)	24 (75)	24 (75)	23 (73)	24 (75)
Average precipitation mm (inches)	78 (3.1)	57 (2.2)	84 (3.3)	79 (3.1)	118 (4.6)	181 (7.1)	178 (7.0)	169 (6.7)	172 (6.8)	180 (7.1)	174 (6.9)	128 (5.0)	1,598 (62.9)
Average rainy days	16.7	13.8	17.3	18.5	23.2	26.5	27.1	26.0	26.4	27.5	24.6	21.0	268.6
Source: Meteoblue

== Demographics ==
Population census of MacArthur
Year	Pop.	±% p.a.
1960	10,647	—
1970	11,486	+0.76%
1975	12,433	+1.60%
1980	12,780	+0.55%
1990	13,159	+0.29%
1995	16,645	+4.50%
2000	16,844	+0.26%
2007	17,608	+0.61%
2010	18,724	+2.26%
2015	21,211	+2.40%
2020	21,578	+0.36%
2024	22,256	+0.75%
Source: Philippine Statistics Authority

In the 2024 census, the population of MacArthur was 22,256 people, with a density of 390 inhabitants per square kilometre or 1,000 inhabitants per square mile.

== Economy ==
Poverty incidence of MacArthur (%)

Source: Philippine Statistics Authority
