= Legislative districts of Leyte =

Philippine electoral districts

The legislative districts of Leyte are the representations of the province of Leyte, the independent component city of Ormoc, and highly urbanized city of Tacloban in the various national legislatures of the Philippines. The province, together with the independent cities are currently represented in the lower house of the Congress of the Philippines through their first, second, third, fourth, and fifth congressional districts.

Southern Leyte and Biliran last formed part of the province's representation in 1961 and 1995, respectively.

== History ==
Leyte was originally divided into four congressional districts from 1907 until 1931, when it was redistricted to five congressional districts by virtue of Act No. 3788.

When seats for the upper house of the Philippine Legislature were elected from territory-based districts between 1916 and 1935, the province formed part of the ninth senatorial district which elected two out of the 24-member senate.

In the disruption caused by the Second World War, two delegates represented the province in the National Assembly of the Japanese-sponsored Second Philippine Republic: one was the provincial governor (an ex officio member), while the other was elected through a provincial assembly of KALIBAPI members during the Japanese occupation of the Philippines. Upon the restoration of the Philippine Commonwealth in 1945, the province retained its five pre-war representative districts.

Even after receiving their own city charters, Ormoc and Tacloban remained part of the representation of the Province of Leyte by virtue of Section 90 of Republic Act No. 179 (June 21, 1947), and Section 91 of Republic Act No. 760 (June 20, 1952), respectively.

Republic Act No. 2227, enacted on May 22, 1959, created the province of Southern Leyte from the southern municipalities of Leyte that constituted its third congressional district. Per Section 5 of R.A. 2227, the incumbent representatives of all five districts of Leyte continued to serve for the remainder of 4th Congress. Starting in the 1961 elections, Leyte's remaining four districts were renumbered; the first, second, fourth and fifth districts were re-designated as the third, fourth, first and second districts, respectively.

Leyte was represented in the Interim Batasang Pambansa as part of Region VIII from 1978 to 1984. The province returned five representatives, elected at-large, to the Regular Batasang Pambansa in 1984.

Under the new Constitution which was proclaimed on February 11, 1987, the province was re-apportioned into five districts, each of which elected its member to the restored House of Representatives starting that same year.

A plebiscite held on May 11, 1992, approved the establishment of Biliran (a sub-province of Leyte since 1959) as a regular province, by virtue of Section 462 of Republic Act No. 7160 (Local Government Code of 1991). Biliran continued to be represented as part of the third district of Leyte until it elected its own representative in the 1995 elections.

== Current districts ==
The province's current congressional delegation composes of two members of the Lakas–CMD, one member of the Nationalist People's Coalition, one member of the National Unity Party and one member of the Partido Federal ng Pilipinas.

Legislative districts and representatives of Leyte
District	Current Representative		Party	Constituent LGUs	Population (2020)	Area	Map
District	Image	Name	Party	Constituent LGUs	Population (2020)	Area	Map
1st		Ferdinand Martin G. Romualdez (since 2019); Tacloban	Lakas	List: Alangalang; Babatngon; Palo; San Miguel; Santa Fe; Tacloban (Note: Does not vote for provincial officials since becoming a highly urbanized city in 1988. Only votes with Leyte for representation in the various national legislatures.); Tanauan; Tolosa	534,120	988.74 km²	
2nd		Lolita T. Javier (since 2019); Jaro	NPC	List: Barugo; Burauen; Capoocan; Carigara; Dagami; Dulag; Jaro; Julita; La Paz; MacArthur; Mayorga; Pastrana; Tabontabon; Tunga	417,651	1,476.72 km²	
3rd		Anna Victoria V. Tuazon (since 2022); Villaba	NUP	List: Calubian; Leyte; San Isidro; Tabango; Villaba	179,492	651.64 km²	
4th		Richard I. Gomez (since 2022); Ormoc	PFP	List: Albuera; Isabel; Kananga; Matag-ob; Merida; Ormoc; Palompon	492,035	1,450.84 km²	
5th		Carl Nicolas C. Cari (since 2019); Baybay	Lakas	List: Abuyog; Baybay; Bato; Hilongos; Hindang; Inopacan; Javier; Mahaplag; Matalom	405,430	1,947.11 km²	

== At-Large (defunct) ==
=== 1943–1944 ===
- also encompasses present-day provinces of Biliran and Southern Leyte, and the independent cities of Ormoc and Tacloban

Period	Representatives
National Assembly; 1943–1944	Jose Maria Veloso
National Assembly; 1943–1944	Bernardo Torres (ex officio)

=== 1984–1986 ===
- also encompasses present-day province of Biliran, and the independent cities of Ormoc and Tacloban

Period	Representatives
Regular Batasang Pambansa; 1984–1986	Damian V. Aldaba
Regular Batasang Pambansa; 1984–1986	Artemio E. Mate
Regular Batasang Pambansa; 1984–1986	Emiliano J. Melgazo
Regular Batasang Pambansa; 1984–1986	Benjamin T. Romualdez
Regular Batasang Pambansa; 1984–1986	Alberto S. Veloso

== See also ==
- Legislative district of Biliran
- Legislative districts of Southern Leyte
