= Leyte's 5th congressional district =

Legislative district of the Philippines

- Constituency for the House of Representatives of the Philippines
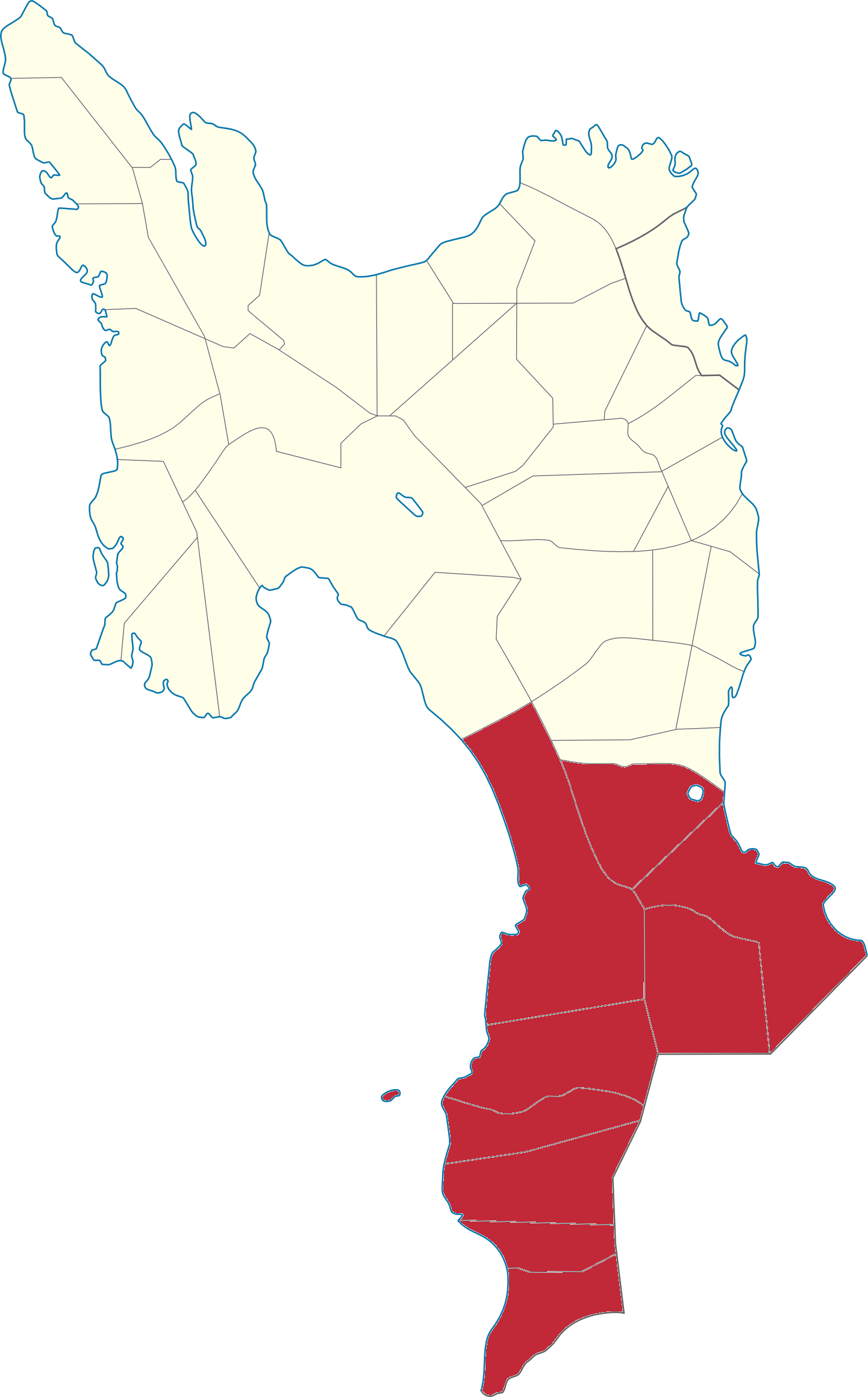
- Boundary of Leyte's 5th congressional district in Leyte

- Location of Leyte within the Philippines
- Province: Leyte
- Region: Eastern Visayas
- Population: 405,430 (2020)
- Electorate: 273,212 (2025)
- Major settlements: 9 LGUs: Cities; Baybay; Municipalities; Abuyog; Bato; Hilongos; Hindang; Inopacan; Javier; Mahaplag; Matalom
- Area: 1,947.11 km^{2} (751.78 sq mi)

Current constituency
- Created: 1930
- Representative: Carl Cari
- Political party: Lakas
- Congressional bloc: Majority

Leyte's 5th congressional district is one of the five congressional districts of the Philippines in the province of Leyte. It has been represented in the House of Representatives of the Philippines since 1931. The district consists of the city of Baybay and adjacent municipalities of Abuyog, Bato, Hilongos, Hindang, Inopacan, Javier, Mahaplag and Matalom, since its second restoration in 1987. It is currently represented in the 20th Congress by Carl Cari of the Lakas–CMD.

Prior to its second dissolution in 1961 due to the creation of Southern Leyte, the district consisted of the central municipalities of Alangalang, Barugo, Burauen, Capoocan, Carigara, Dagami, Jaro, Julita, La Paz, Pastrana, Tabontabon, and Tunga. All these municipalities were subsequently redistricted to the 2nd district.

== Representation history ==
#	Image	Member	Term of office		Legislature	Party	Electoral history	Constituent LGUs
#	Image	Member	Start	End	Legislature	Party	Electoral history	Constituent LGUs
=== Leyte's 5th district for the House of Representatives of the Philippine Islands ===
District created December 2, 1930.
1		Ruperto Kapunan	June 2, 1931	June 5, 1934	9th	Nacionalista; Consolidado	Elected in 1931.	1931–1935; Alangalang, Barugo, Burauen, Capoocan, Carigara, Dagami, Jaro, La Paz, Pastrana
2		Jorge B. Delgado	June 5, 1934	September 16, 1935	10th	Nacionalista; Democrático	Elected in 1934.	1931–1935; Alangalang, Barugo, Burauen, Capoocan, Carigara, Dagami, Jaro, La Paz, Pastrana
#	Image	Member	Term of office		National Assembly	Party	Electoral history	Constituent LGUs
#	Image	Member	Start	End	National Assembly	Party	Electoral history	Constituent LGUs
=== Leyte's 5th district for the National Assembly (Commonwealth of the Philippines) ===
(1)		Ruperto Kapunan	September 16, 1935	February 4, 1939	1st	Nacionalista; Democrático	Elected in 1935.	1935–1941; Alangalang, Barugo, Burauen, Capoocan, Carigara, Dagami, Jaro, La Paz, Pastrana
(1)		Ruperto Kapunan	September 16, 1935	February 4, 1939	2nd	Nacionalista	Re-elected in 1938. Died.	1935–1941; Alangalang, Barugo, Burauen, Capoocan, Carigara, Dagami, Jaro, La Paz, Pastrana
3		Atilano R. Cinco	December 10, 1940	December 30, 1941	2nd	Nacionalista	Elected in 1940 to finish Kapunan's term.	1935–1941; Alangalang, Barugo, Burauen, Capoocan, Carigara, Dagami, Jaro, La Paz, Pastrana
District dissolved into the two-seat Leyte's at-large district for the National Assembly (Second Philippine Republic).
#	Image	Member	Term of office		Common wealth Congress	Party	Electoral history	Constituent LGUs
#	Image	Member	Start	End	Common wealth Congress	Party	Electoral history	Constituent LGUs
=== Leyte's 5th district for the House of Representatives of the Commonwealth of the Philippines ===
District re-created May 24, 1945.
4		José María Veloso	June 11, 1945	May 25, 1946	1st	Nacionalista	Elected in 1941.	1945–1946; Alangalang, Barugo, Burauen, Capoocan, Carigara, Dagami, Jaro, La Paz, Pastrana
#	Image	Member	Term of office		Congress	Party	Electoral history	Constituent LGUs
#	Image	Member	Start	End	Congress	Party	Electoral history	Constituent LGUs
=== Leyte's 5th district for the House of Representatives of the Philippines ===
(3)		Atilano R. Cinco	May 25, 1946	December 30, 1953	1st	Liberal	Elected in 1946.	1946–1949; Alangalang, Barugo, Burauen, Capoocan, Carigara, Dagami, Jaro, La Paz, Pastrana
(3)		Atilano R. Cinco	May 25, 1946	December 30, 1953	2nd	Liberal	Re-elected in 1949.	1949–1953; Alangalang, Barugo, Burauen, Capoocan, Carigara, Dagami, Jaro, Julita, La Paz, Pastrana, Tunga
5		Alberto T. Aguja	December 30, 1953	December 30, 1961	3rd	Nacionalista	Elected in 1953.	1953–1961; Alangalang, Barugo, Burauen, Capoocan, Carigara, Dagami, Jaro, Julita, La Paz, Pastrana, Tabontabon, Tunga
5		Alberto T. Aguja	December 30, 1953	December 30, 1961	4th	Nacionalista	Re-elected in 1957.	1953–1961; Alangalang, Barugo, Burauen, Capoocan, Carigara, Dagami, Jaro, Julita, La Paz, Pastrana, Tabontabon, Tunga
District dissolved into Leyte's 2nd district.
District re-created February 2, 1987.
6		Eriberto Loreto	June 30, 1987	June 30, 1998	8th	Independent	Elected in 1987.	1987–present Abuyog, Bato, Baybay, Hilongos, Hindang, Inopacan, Javier, Mahaplag, Matalom
6		Eriberto Loreto	June 30, 1987	June 30, 1998	9th	Lakas	Re-elected in 1992.	1987–present Abuyog, Bato, Baybay, Hilongos, Hindang, Inopacan, Javier, Mahaplag, Matalom
6		Eriberto Loreto	June 30, 1987	June 30, 1998	10th	Lakas	Re-elected in 1995.	1987–present Abuyog, Bato, Baybay, Hilongos, Hindang, Inopacan, Javier, Mahaplag, Matalom
7		Ma. Catalina L. Go	June 30, 1998	June 30, 2001	11th	LAMMP	Elected in 1998.	1987–present Abuyog, Bato, Baybay, Hilongos, Hindang, Inopacan, Javier, Mahaplag, Matalom
8		Carmen L. Cari	June 30, 2001	June 30, 2010	12th	Lakas	Elected in 2001.	1987–present Abuyog, Bato, Baybay, Hilongos, Hindang, Inopacan, Javier, Mahaplag, Matalom
8		Carmen L. Cari	June 30, 2001	June 30, 2010	13th	Lakas	Re-elected in 2004.	1987–present Abuyog, Bato, Baybay, Hilongos, Hindang, Inopacan, Javier, Mahaplag, Matalom
8		Carmen L. Cari	June 30, 2001	June 30, 2010	14th	Lakas	Re-elected in 2007.	1987–present Abuyog, Bato, Baybay, Hilongos, Hindang, Inopacan, Javier, Mahaplag, Matalom
9		Jose Carlos L. Cari	June 30, 2010	June 30, 2019	15th	Liberal	Elected in 2010.	1987–present Abuyog, Bato, Baybay, Hilongos, Hindang, Inopacan, Javier, Mahaplag, Matalom
9		Jose Carlos L. Cari	June 30, 2010	June 30, 2019	16th	Liberal	Re-elected in 2013.	1987–present Abuyog, Bato, Baybay, Hilongos, Hindang, Inopacan, Javier, Mahaplag, Matalom
9		Jose Carlos L. Cari	June 30, 2010	June 30, 2019	17th	PFP	Re-elected in 2016.	1987–present Abuyog, Bato, Baybay, Hilongos, Hindang, Inopacan, Javier, Mahaplag, Matalom
10		Carl Nicolas C. Cari	June 30, 2019	Incumbent	18th	PFP	Elected in 2019.	1987–present Abuyog, Bato, Baybay, Hilongos, Hindang, Inopacan, Javier, Mahaplag, Matalom
10		Carl Nicolas C. Cari	June 30, 2019	Incumbent	19th	PDP–Laban	Re-elected in 2022.	1987–present Abuyog, Bato, Baybay, Hilongos, Hindang, Inopacan, Javier, Mahaplag, Matalom
10		Carl Nicolas C. Cari	June 30, 2019	Incumbent	20th	Lakas	Re-elected in 2025.	1987–present Abuyog, Bato, Baybay, Hilongos, Hindang, Inopacan, Javier, Mahaplag, Matalom

== Election results ==
=== 2025 ===
Candidate	Party	Votes	%
Carl Cari (incumbent)	Lakas–CMD	154,025	75.94
Levito Baligod	Independent	48,806	24.06
Total		202,831	100.00
Valid votes		202,831	88.29
Invalid/blank votes		26,901	11.71
Total votes		229,732	100.00
Registered voters/turnout		273,212	84.09
Lakas–CMD hold			
Source: Commission on Elections

=== 2022 ===
2022 Leyte's 5th congressional district election
Party	Candidate	Votes	%
PDP–Laban	Carl Cari (incumbent)	172,023	100.00%
Total votes		172,023	100.00%
PDP–Laban hold			

=== 2019 ===
2019 Leyte's 5th congressional district election
Party	Candidate	Votes	%
PFP	Carl Cari	123,572	66.86%
NPC	Marilou Baligod	60,395	32.68%
Independent	Baldomero Falcone	858	0.46%
Total votes		184,825	100.00%
PFP hold			

=== 2016 ===
2016 Leyte's 5th congressional district election
Party	Candidate	Votes	%
Liberal	Jose Carlos Cari (incumbent)	134,955	91.81
UNA	Gongie Galenzoga	12,033	8.19
Invalid or blank votes		45,646	23.70
Total votes		192,634	100.00
Liberal hold			

=== 2013 ===
2013 Leyte's 5th congressional district election
Party	Candidate	Votes	%
Liberal	Jose Carlos Cari (incumbent)	78,149	63.10
UNA	Renato Roble	16,779	13.66
Independent	Crispulo Truya	780	0.63
Invalid or blank votes		27,147	22.10
Total votes		122,855	100.00
Liberal hold			

=== 2010 ===
2010 Leyte's 5th congressional district election
Party	Candidate	Votes	%
Lakas–Kampi	Jose Carlos Cari	118,113	100.00
Invalid or blank votes		55,119	31.82
Total votes		173,232	100.00
Lakas–Kampi hold			

== See also ==
- Legislative districts of Leyte
