= 16th Division (Imperial Japanese Army) =

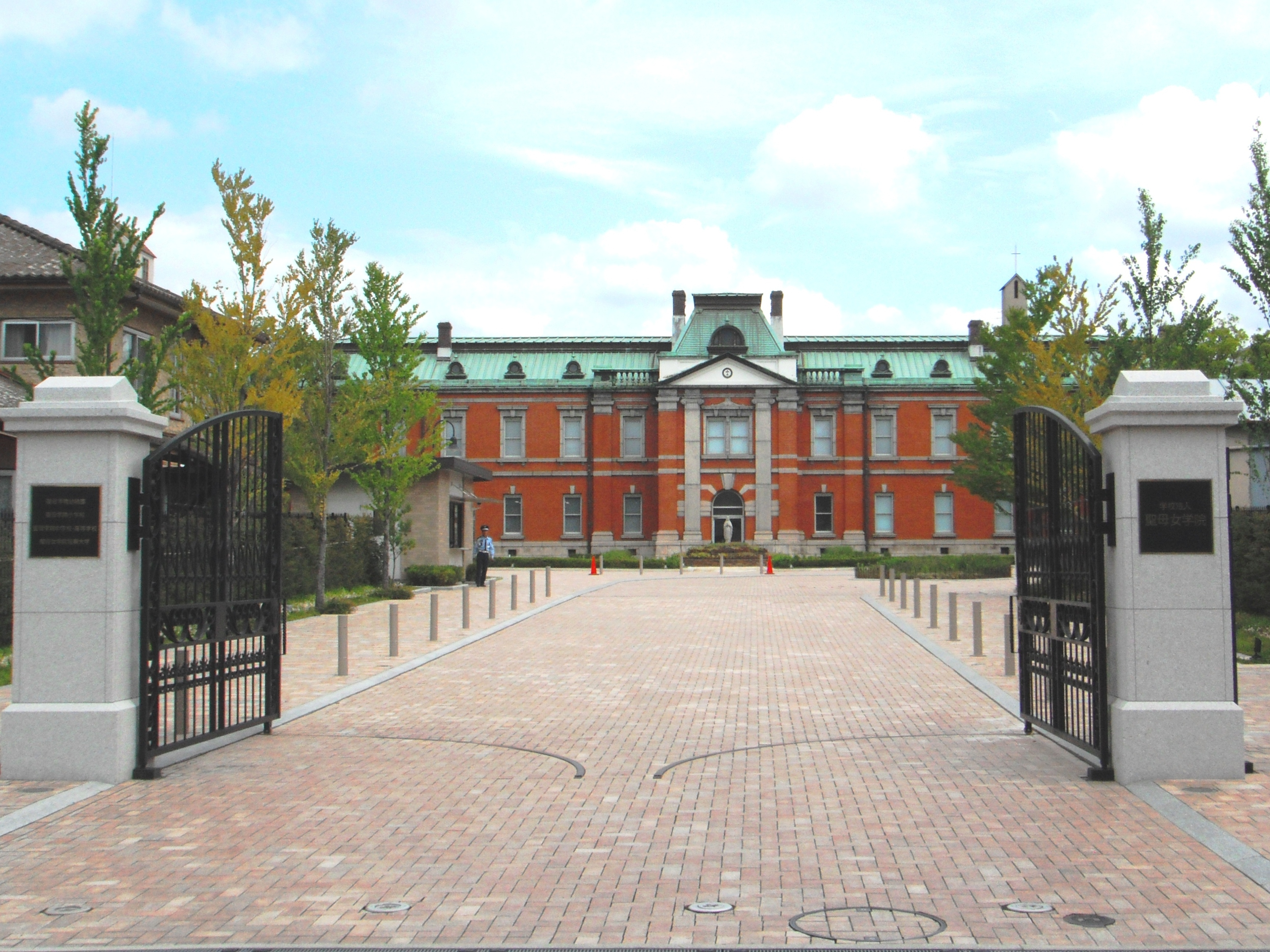
- IJA 16th Division HQ in Kyoto
- Active: 1905 - 1945
- Country: Empire of Japan
- Branch: Imperial Japanese Army
- Type: Infantry
- Size: 25,000 men
- Garrison/HQ: Kyoto
- Nickname: Wall Division
- Engagements: Russo-Japanese War; Second Sino-Japanese War; Pacific War

Commanders
- Current commander: Prince Nashimoto (Morimasa); Minami Jiro; Kanji Ishiwara; Shiro Makino

The 16th Division (第16師団, Dai Jūroku Shidan) was an infantry division in the Imperial Japanese Army. Its tsūshōgō code name was the Wall Division (垣兵団, Kaki Heidan), and its military symbol was 16D. The 16th Division was one of four new infantry divisions raised by the Imperial Japanese Army in the closing stages of the Russo-Japanese War (1904–1905). With Japan's limited resources towards the end of that conflict, the entire IJA was committed to combat in Manchuria, leaving not a single division to guard the Japanese home islands from attack. The 16th Division was initially raised from men in the area surrounding Kyoto 18 July 1905 under the command of Lieutenant General Yamanaka Nobuyoshi.

== Action ==
The 16th Division was immediately deployed to Manchuria, but the peace process was already underway since 6 August 1905, culminating with the signing of the Treaty of Portsmouth on 5 September 1905. As a consequence, the 16th division could not see any combat.

On 28 March 1907 the divisional headquarters was established in what is now the city of Takaishi, Osaka, but was relocated to Kyoto 30 October 1908. The divisions were sent thrice to Manchuria to perform a garrison duties - in 1919, 1929 and 1934.

While in Kyoto, the division was called upon to provide emergency relief efforts during massive flooding of the Kamo River 28 June 1935. For the three days, sappers from the division helped shore up dikes and construct temporary bridges, while over a thousand men assisted with traffic control and rescue efforts at the request of the Kyoto city government.

In July 1937, open hostilities broke out against China and the Second Sino-Japanese War commenced. The 16th Division, under the command of Lieutenant General Kesago Nakajima, was assigned to the Second Army, as part of the Northern China Area Army. The division participated in the Second Shanghai Incident(August–November 1937), Beiping–Hankou Railway Operation (August–December 1937), the Battle of Nanjing (December 1937), the Battle of Xuzhou (January 1938) and the Battle of Wuhan (July–October 1938). It was thus one of the Japanese military units implicated in the Nanjing Massacre. In December 1938, the 16th division was incorporated into the 11th army.

The division was demobilized and returned to Japan in August 1939. At that time, the division was re-organized into a triangular division, with the 38th Infantry Regiment transferred to become the core of the newly formed 29th Division. The reformed 16th division was mobilized and permanently re-located to Manchukuo in July 1940.

The 16th Division was assigned to the 14th Area Army 6 November 1941 and participated in the Philippines campaign (1941–1942). Later it was based in Manila as a garrison force.

However, as the war situation deteriorated in August 1944, the Imperial General Headquarters ordered the 16th Division to Leyte Island as part of the 35th Army for a final decisive stand against Allied forces. 22 October 1944, the divisional headquarters were placed in Dagami, which contributed to the difficulty controlling troops in Kananga - Jaro - Tanauan - Tabontabon - Catmon hill in Tolosa - Julita - Burauen semi-circular defence perimeter. The initial US attack on Tabontabon was repulsed 25 October 1944, but Tabontabon positions were lost 28 October 1944, followed by outlying stronghold of Catmon hill in Tolosa 29 October 1944. As the result of the Tabontabon breakthrough, the northern part of the Japanese positions in Jaro was cut off and annihilated 29 October 1944, followed by Rizal in Kananga and Dagami itself falling to US forces 30 October 1944. Disorganized and cut off survivors of the division have gathered together in a single battalion (about 500 men) by 2 December 1944 in a mountains southwest of Dagami. That battalion has led the Battle of the Airfields 6 December 1944, an attack on abandoned US airstrips on Leyte east coast, which failed after some initial successes 9 December 1944. After the capture of the Ormoc by US 77th division 10 December 1944, the survivors of the 16th division (about 200 men at this point) were ordered to disengage and retreat westward. 16th division commander, Lieutenant General Shiro Makino, was ordered to control all of the Japanese forces remaining on Leyte after 17 March 1945, and committed suicide during the battle, 10 August 1945. Of the approximately 13,000 men in the 16th Division, only 620 survived the Battle of Leyte.

== Post-war use ==
The building today exists as Kyoto Seibo Gakuin High School as a private high school founded in 1949 in the current site. It served as a model for the school named "Usagiyama High School" in the 2013 anime television series Tamako Market.

== See also ==
- List of Japanese Infantry Divisions

== Reference and further reading ==
- Madej, W. Victor. Japanese Armed Forces Order of Battle, 1937-1945 [2 vols] Allentown, PA: 1981
- Yamamoto, Masahiro. Nanking: Anatomy of an Atrocity. Greenwood Publishing, (2000) ISBN 0275969045
- Rottman, Gordon. Japanese Army in World War II: Conquest of the Pacific 1941-42. Osprey Publishing (2005) ISBN 1841767891
- Cannon, M. Hamlin. War in the Pacific: Leyte, Return to the Philippines. Government Printing Office (1954) LOC 53-61979
- This article incorporates material from the Japanese Wikipedia page 第16師団 (日本軍), accessed 3 March 2016
