= Dominador Tan =

Filipino lawyer and politician (1905–1992)

- Tan's official portrait during the 6th Congress

Member of the Philippine House of Representatives for Leyte
- In office December 30, 1961 – December 30, 1969
- Preceded by: Daniel Romualdez
- Succeeded by: Rodolfo Rivilla
- Constituency: 4th district
- In office December 30, 1957 – December 30, 1961
- Preceded by: Domingo Veloso
- Succeeded by: Primo Villasin
- In office June 9, 1945 – May 25, 1946
- Preceded by: Himself (in the Commonwealth National Assembly)
- Succeeded by: Domingo Veloso
- In office June 5, 1934 – November 15, 1935
- Preceded by: Pacifico Ybañez
- Succeeded by: Himself (in the Commonwealth National Assembly)
- Constituency: 2nd district

Member of the National Assembly of the Philippines for Leyte's 2nd district
- In office November 15, 1935 – December 30, 1941
- Period: Commonwealth
- Preceded by: Himself (in the House of Representatives)
- Succeeded by: District abolished (seat later held by himself in 1945)

Personal details
- Born: Dominador Medalle Tan; March 21, 1905 Ormoc, Leyte, Philippine Islands
- Died: October 6, 1992 (aged 87)
- Party: Liberal (1965–1992)
- Other political affiliations: Nacionalista (1934–1941; 1945–1965); KALIBAPI (1942–1945)

Dominador Medalle Tan (March 21, 1905 – October 6, 1992) was a Filipino lawyer, economist, taxation expert, and politician who served as a member of the Philippine House of Representatives for Leyte's 2nd congressional district from 1934 to 1935, 1945 to 1946 and 1957 to 1961, and Leyte's 4th congressional district from 1961 to 1969. He also served in the National Assembly during the Commonwealth period representing Leyte's 2nd district from 1935 to 1941.

== Early life and education ==
Tan was born on March 21, 1905, in Ormoc, Leyte, to Meliton Tan, a former justice of the peace during the First Republic and was a classmate of Manuel L. Quezon and Sergio Osmeña in law school, and Rufina Medalle, a revolutionary who was ordered by General Douglas MacArthur to be deported to Guam after being taken prisoner, but whose deportation was prevented by Osmeña. He attended Ormoc Elementary School for his primary education and San Carlos College for his secondary and tertiary education. He also studied at the Philippine Law School, where he earned his Bachelor of Laws degree in 1926.

== Career ==
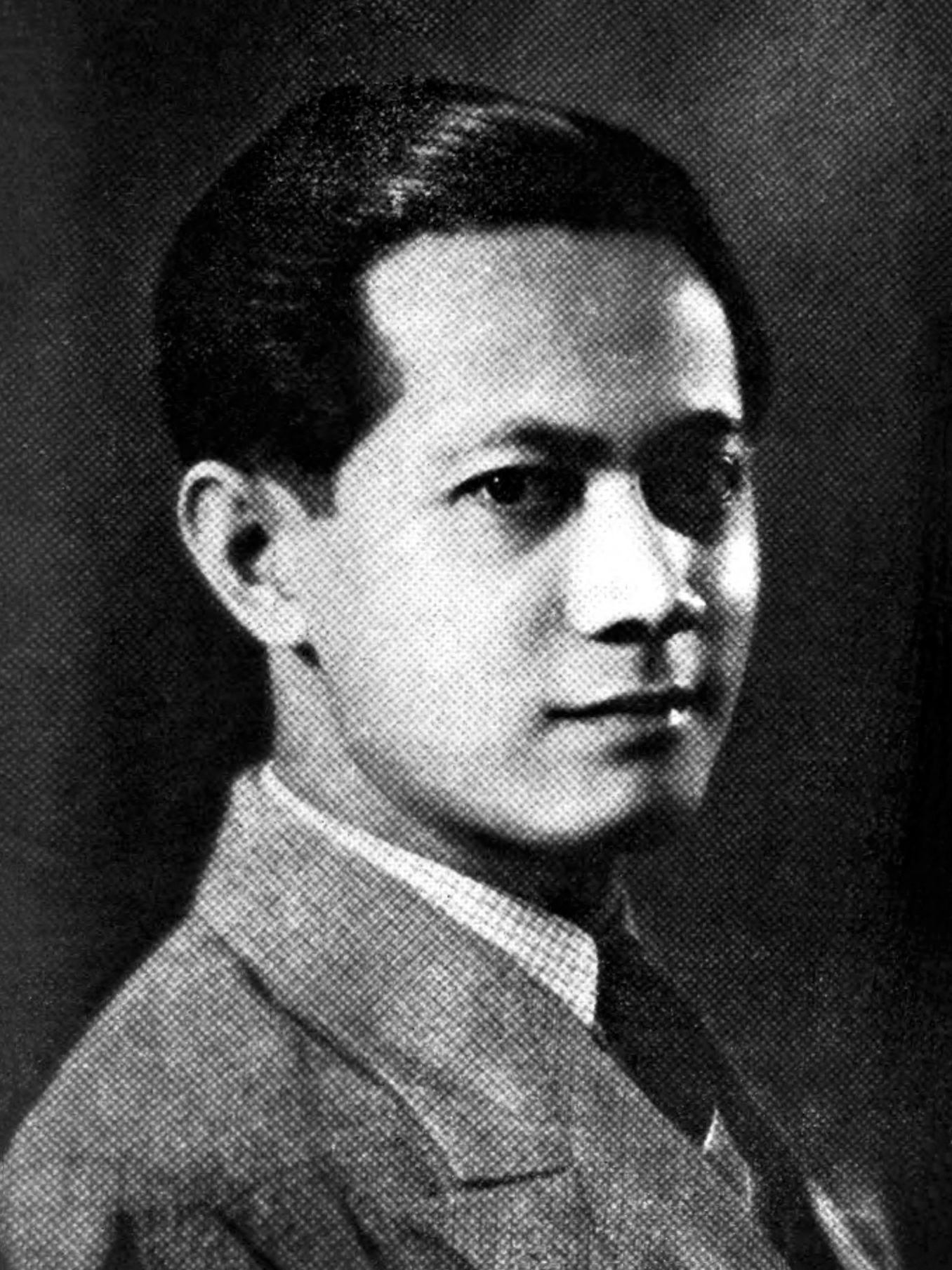
A photograph of Tan from The Commercial & Industrial Manual of the Philippines, 1941

Tan began his professional career as a translator for the Bureau of Agriculture and later worked in the Bureau of Internal Revenue and the Department of Finance. He practiced law in Manila and Leyte and was elected to the Ormoc City Council before the outbreak of World War II. In 1934, he successfully ran for representative of Leyte's 2nd congressional district in the House of Representatives. Tan represented the same district in the Commonwealth National Assembly from 1935 to 1941.

In 1940, Tan, together with Assembly speaker Jose Yulo, witnessed the approval of the new Philippine constitution by U.S. president Franklin Roosevelt.

During the Japanese occupation, Tan was appointed by President Jose P. Laurel as assistant director-general of the ruling KALIBAPI party.

Tan served a new term as representative for Leyte's 2nd district after the House was re-established in 1945, having been elected in 1941.

Tan successfully sought another congressional term in 1957. He was redistricted to Leyte's 4th district in 1961, winning that year's election. In 1962, Tan was the representative who moved for the reorganization of the House leadership, which unseated speaker Daniel Romualdez. He eventually joined the Liberal Party with 30 other congressmen to help elect Cornelio Villareal as speaker in the 5th Congress.

He was reelected in 1965, the only Liberal candidate to win a seat in the four districts in Leyte.

== Personal life ==
Tan was a member of the Knights of Columbus. He was married to his first wife, Lilia Lopez, with whom he had two children. His wife and their children died after the SS Corregidor struck a mine in Manila Bay off Corregidor while en route to Leyte, following the start of the Japanese invasion in December 1941. He later married Patria Macandog, with whom he had at least six children.

Tan died on October 6, 1992.

House of Representatives of the Philippines
Preceded by Daniel Romualdez	Member of the Philippine House of Representatives for Leyte's 4th district 1961–1969	Succeeded by Rodolfo Rivilla
Preceded by Domingo Veloso	Member of the Philippine House of Representatives for Leyte's 2nd district 1957–1961	Succeeded by Primo Villasin
Preceded by Himself (in the Commonwealth National Assembly)	Member of the Philippine House of Representatives for Leyte's 2nd district 1945–1946	Succeeded by Domingo Veloso
Preceded by Himself (in the House of Representatives)	Member of the National Assembly of the Philippines for Leyte's 2nd district 1935–1941	Vacant District dissolved into Leyte's at-large district Title next held by Himself (in the House of Representatives)
Preceded by Pacifico Ybañez	Member of the Philippine House of Representatives for Leyte's 2nd district 1934–1935	Succeeded by Himself (in the Commonwealth National Assembly)
