= Tunga, Leyte =

Municipality in Leyte, Philippines

Tunga
- Municipality
- Municipality of Tunga
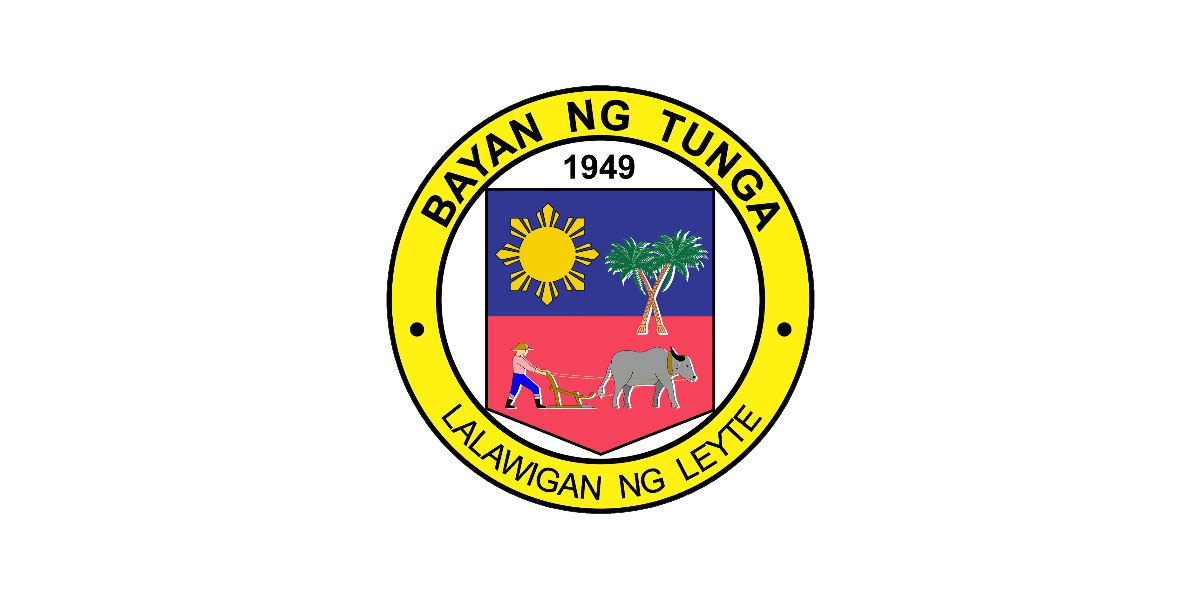
- Flag Seal

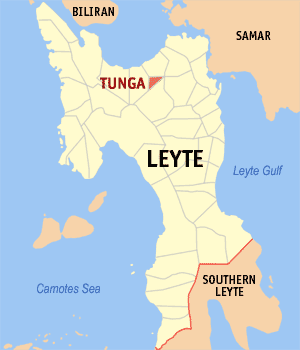
- Map of Leyte with Tunga highlighted
- Interactive map of Tunga
- Location within the Philippines
- Coordinates: 11°15′N 124°45′E
- Country: Philippines
- Region: Eastern Visayas
- Province: Leyte
- District: 2nd district
- Founded: November 15, 1949
- Barangays: 8 (see Barangays)

Government
  - Type: Sangguniang Bayan
  - Mayor: Reinbert C. Costelo
  - Vice Mayor: Egidio G. Baac
  - Representative: Lolita T. Javier
  - Councilors: List: • Martiniano F. Requiez; • Rex S. Ergina; • Egidio G. Baac; • Juanito G. Fallorina; • Ma. Evelyn P. Avila; • Joselito L. Arintoc; • Valero O. Obsequio; • Lemuel G. Ponferrada; DILG Masterlist of Officials
  - Electorate: 7,210 voters (2025)

Area
  - Total: 7.70 km^{2} (2.97 sq mi)
- Elevation: 56.9 m (187 ft)

Population (2024 census)
  - Total: 8,301
  - Density: 1,080/km^{2} (2,790/sq mi)
  - Households: 1,764

Economy
  - Income class: 5th municipal income class
  - Poverty incidence: 25.43% (2023)
  - Revenue: ₱ 75.75 million (2024)
  - Assets: ₱ 193.8 million (2024)
  - Expenditure: ₱ 69.27 million (2024)
  - Liabilities: ₱ 32.83 million (2024)

Service provider
  - Electricity: Leyte 3 Electric Cooperative (LEYECO 3)
- Time zone: UTC+8 (PST)
- ZIP code: 6528
- PSGC: 0803750000
- IDD : area code: +63 (0)53
- Native languages: Waray; Tagalog
- Website: tunga.gov.ph

Tunga (IPA: [tu'ŋaʔ]), officially the Municipality of Tunga (Waray: Bungto han Tunga; Tagalog: Bayan ng Tunga), is a municipality in the province of Leyte, Philippines. According to the 2024 census, it has a population of 8,301 people.

It is the smallest municipality in Leyte, both in population and area.

== History ==
The municipality of Tunga existed as early as 1860 as a barrio of Barugo. At that time, only about fifty families were residing there, most of them coming from the different towns of Barugo, Carigara and Jaro. There are different versions that have been told as to why the place was called Tunga. Due to their stronger credibility, only two of these legends have been selected as the possible ones. One states that before Tunga became a barrio, people from Ormoc, Carigara, Barugo, Jaro and Tacloban engaged in trade with each other and they had to stop by on this place. Some of them even made it their contact point for conducting their business. Through their exchange of ideas and conversations, they concluded that this place was halfway between Ormoc, Tacloban and Carigara and Jaro. Since it had no name at the time, people started calling it Tunga, Waray term for "half". When it became a barrio, the residents, due to their familiarity with the name christened the place Tunga.

During World War II after the American landing in Leyte, Tunga was captured by the American forces coming from Jaro on 1 November 1944.

On March 4, 1948, Pag-Urosa Han Mga Tungan-on, an association that led the campaign to make Tunga an independent municipality, was organized. Its elected officials included Domingo A. Ponferrada, president; Martino Ariza, Blas Uribe and Vicente Catenza, vice presidents; Primitivo Geraldo, secretary; Norberto Quintana, treasurer; Ramón Santillan Sr. and Juan Avila, auditors; and Paulo Cotoner, Magno Buñales and Arsenio Carit, sergeants-at-arms. The organization invited Leyte 5th District Representative Atilano R. Cinco, to join them on the move for an independent municipality of Tunga. Upon Cinco's urge, a consensus committee was created with Martino Ariza as chairperson, with its members being some of the students of Tunga Institute.

Subsequently, President Elpidio Quirino issued Executive Order No. 266 on September 24, 1949, creating the independent municipality of Tunga. However the appointed local officials had to assume their posts a few days after the elections.

On November 15, 1949, Provincial Board Secretary Ricardo Collantes, representing Leyte Governor Catalino Landia, proclaimed the foundation of the Municipality of Tunga before a huge crowd of joyous Tungan-on and distinguished visitors.

The patron saint of Tunga is Saint Anthony of Padua. The Tungan-ons celebrate their town's fiesta annually on the 13th of August.

== Geography ==
=== Barangays ===
Tunga is politically subdivided into 8 barangays. Each barangay consists of puroks and some have sitios.

- Astorga (Barrio Upat)
- Balire
- Banawang
- San Antonio (Poblacion)
- San Pedro (Poblacion)
- San Roque (Poblacion)
- San Vicente (Poblacion)
- Santo Niño (Poblacion)

=== Climate ===
Climate data for Tunga, Leyte
Month	Jan	Feb	Mar	Apr	May	Jun	Jul	Aug	Sep	Oct	Nov	Dec	Year
Mean daily maximum °C (°F)	28 (82)	28 (82)	29 (84)	30 (86)	30 (86)	30 (86)	29 (84)	29 (84)	29 (84)	29 (84)	29 (84)	28 (82)	29 (84)
Mean daily minimum °C (°F)	22 (72)	22 (72)	22 (72)	23 (73)	24 (75)	24 (75)	24 (75)	24 (75)	24 (75)	24 (75)	23 (73)	23 (73)	23 (74)
Average precipitation mm (inches)	73 (2.9)	56 (2.2)	75 (3.0)	71 (2.8)	114 (4.5)	174 (6.9)	172 (6.8)	163 (6.4)	167 (6.6)	161 (6.3)	158 (6.2)	125 (4.9)	1,509 (59.5)
Average rainy days	15.2	12.5	16.2	17.3	23.9	27.3	28.4	26.9	26.9	27.1	23.8	19.3	264.8
Source: Meteoblue

== Demographics ==
Population census of Tunga

Year	Pop.	±% p.a.
1960	5,168	—
1970	3,876	−2.83%
1975	9,413	+19.48%
1980	4,969	−11.99%
1990	5,413	+0.86%
1995	6,530	+3.58%

Year	Pop.	±% p.a.
2000	6,111	−1.41%
2007	6,221	+0.25%
2010	6,516	+1.70%
2015	7,584	+2.93%
2020	7,656	+0.20%
2024	8,301	+1.96%

Source: Philippine Statistics Authority

In the 2024 census, the population of Tunga was 8,301 people, with a density of 1,100 inhabitants per square kilometre or 2,800 inhabitants per square mile.

== Economy ==
Poverty incidence of Tunga (%)

Source: Philippine Statistics Authority

The socio-economic situation in Tunga can be described as poor with little outside investment and few opportunities for most of the municipality's citizens to improve their economic status. Income per capita is very low and the poverty incidence is alarming. The magnitude of families living below the poverty threshold is much too high. The under-employment rate is high and most people hold informal jobs and carry out various activities daily to earn barely a subsistence income for their families. The percent of households without their own dwellings is high.

Elementary education participation is low, reflecting low incomes because families cannot afford to put their children through school and/or children are taken out of school to assist families with income-earning activities. As a result, the simple literacy rate is low.

Crop production indicates very low land productivity with the majority of farmers involved in coconut tree cultivation for copra as their main economic mainstay. Rice cultivation is the second main agricultural activity. Some farmers also raise pigs and chickens to sell to the local meat shop in the local market.

The fish catch, which is mainly Tilapia, in the Tunga River, which flows through the municipality, has decreased since 2005.

== Education ==
There are a total of 4 Elementary Schools and 1 Secondary/High School in Tunga Leyte.

=== Grade School/Elementary Schools ===
- Astorga Elementary School
- Balire Elementary School
- Banawang Elementary School
- Tunga Central School

=== Secondary/High School ===
- Gregorio C. Catenza National High School (Tunga National High School)
