= Leyte's 2nd congressional district =

Legislative district of the Philippines

- Constituency for the House of Representatives of the Philippines
- Boundary of Leyte's 2nd congressional district in Leyte
- Location of Leyte within the Philippines
- Province: Leyte
- Region: Eastern Visayas
- Population: 417,651 (2020)
- Electorate: 295,383 (2022)
- Major settlements: 14 LGUs: Municipalities; Barugo; Burauen; Capoocan; Carigara; Dagami; Dulag; Jaro; Julita; La Paz; MacArthur; Mayorga; Pastrana; Tabontabon; Tunga
- Area: 1,476.72 km^{2} (570.16 sq mi)

Current constituency
- Created: 1907
- Representative: Lolita Javier
- Political party: NPC
- Congressional bloc: Majority

Leyte's 2nd congressional district is one of the five congressional districts of the Philippines in the province of Leyte. It has been represented in the House of Representatives of the Philippines since 1916 and earlier in the Philippine Assembly from 1907 to 1916. The district consists of the central municipalities of Barugo, Burauen, Capoocan, Carigara, Dagami, Dulag, Jaro, Julita, La Paz, MacArthur, Mayorga, Pastrana, Tabontabon and Tunga since its second restoration in 1987. It is currently represented in the 20th Congress by Lolita Javier of the Nationalist People's Coalition (NPC).

Until 1931, it consisted of southern municipalities of undivided Leyte: Bato, Hilongos, Hindang, Inopacan, and Matalom, and present-day Southern Leyte municipalities of Cabalian (now San Juan), Libagon, Liloan, Maasin, Macrohon, Malitbog, Pintuyan, and Sogod. Following the creation of the fifth district, Albuera, Baybay, and Ormoc were added from the first district, while the present-day Southern Leyte municipalities were redistricted to the third district; Kananga was later established out of Ormoc in 1950. Following the creation of Southern Leyte in 1959, these areas were moved to the fourth district, with the central municipalities from the fifth district, such as Alangalang, Barugo, Burauen, Capoocan, Carigara, Dagami, Jaro, Julita, La Paz, Pastrana, Tabontabon, and Tunga, forming the redefined second district from 1961 until its second dissolution in 1972.

== Representation history ==
#	Image	Member	Term of office		Legislature	Party	Electoral history	Constituent LGUs
#	Image	Member	Start	End	Legislature	Party	Electoral history	Constituent LGUs
=== Leyte's 2nd district for the Philippine Assembly ===
District created January 9, 1907.
1		Salvador K. Demeterio	October 16, 1907	October 16, 1909	1st	Nacionalista	Elected in 1907.	1907–1909; Bato, Cabalian, Hilongos, Hindang, Inopacan, Liloan, Maasin, Malitbog, Matalom, Pintuyan, Sogod
2		Francisco Zialcita	October 16, 1909	October 16, 1912	2nd	Liga Popular	Elected in 1909.	1909–1916; Bato, Cabalian, Hilongos, Hindang, Inopacan, Liloan, Maasin, Macrohon, Malitbog, Matalom, Pintuyan, Sogod
3		Dalmacio R. Costas	October 16, 1912	October 16, 1916	3rd	Nacionalista	Elected in 1912.	1909–1916; Bato, Cabalian, Hilongos, Hindang, Inopacan, Liloan, Maasin, Macrohon, Malitbog, Matalom, Pintuyan, Sogod
=== Leyte's 2nd district for the House of Representatives of the Philippine Islands ===
(3)		Dalmacio R. Costas	October 16, 1916	June 3, 1919	4th	Nacionalista	Re-elected in 1916.	1916–1931; Bato, Cabalian, Hilongos, Hindang, Inopacan, Libagon, Liloan, Maasin, Macrohon, Malitbog, Matalom, Pintuyan, Sogod
4		Ciriaco K. Kangleón	June 3, 1919	June 6, 1922	5th	Nacionalista	Elected in 1919.	1916–1931; Bato, Cabalian, Hilongos, Hindang, Inopacan, Libagon, Liloan, Maasin, Macrohon, Malitbog, Matalom, Pintuyan, Sogod
5		Tomás G. Oppus	June 6, 1922	June 2, 1931	6th	Nacionalista; Colectivista	Elected in 1922.	1916–1931; Bato, Cabalian, Hilongos, Hindang, Inopacan, Libagon, Liloan, Maasin, Macrohon, Malitbog, Matalom, Pintuyan, Sogod
5		Tomás G. Oppus	June 6, 1922	June 2, 1931	7th	Nacionalista; Consolidado	Re-elected in 1925.	1916–1931; Bato, Cabalian, Hilongos, Hindang, Inopacan, Libagon, Liloan, Maasin, Macrohon, Malitbog, Matalom, Pintuyan, Sogod
5		Tomás G. Oppus	June 6, 1922	June 2, 1931	8th	Nacionalista; Consolidado	Re-elected in 1928.	1916–1931; Bato, Cabalian, Hilongos, Hindang, Inopacan, Libagon, Liloan, Maasin, Macrohon, Malitbog, Matalom, Pintuyan, Sogod
6		Pacífico Ybáñez	June 2, 1931	June 5, 1934	9th	Nacionalista; Consolidado	Elected in 1931.	1931–1935; Albuera, Bato, Baybay, Hilongos, Hindang, Inopacan, Matalom, Ormoc
7		Dominador Tan	June 5, 1934	September 16, 1935	10th	Nacionalista; Democrático	Elected in 1934.	1931–1935; Albuera, Bato, Baybay, Hilongos, Hindang, Inopacan, Matalom, Ormoc
#	Image	Member	Term of office		National Assembly	Party	Electoral history	Constituent LGUs
#	Image	Member	Start	End	National Assembly	Party	Electoral history	Constituent LGUs
=== Leyte's 2nd district for the National Assembly (Commonwealth of the Philippines) ===
(7)		Dominador Tan	September 16, 1935	December 30, 1941	1st	Nacionalista; Democrático	Re-elected in 1935.	1935–1941; Albuera, Bato, Baybay, Hilongos, Hindang, Inopacan, Matalom, Ormoc
(7)		Dominador Tan	September 16, 1935	December 30, 1941	2nd	Nacionalista	Re-elected in 1938.	1935–1941; Albuera, Bato, Baybay, Hilongos, Hindang, Inopacan, Matalom, Ormoc
District dissolved into the two-seat Leyte's at-large district for the National Assembly (Second Philippine Republic).
#	Image	Member	Term of office		Common wealth Congress	Party	Electoral history	Constituent LGUs
#	Image	Member	Start	End	Common wealth Congress	Party	Electoral history	Constituent LGUs
=== Leyte's 2nd district for the House of Representatives of the Commonwealth of the Philippines ===
District re-created May 24, 1945.
(7)		Dominador Tan	June 11, 1945	May 25, 1946	1st	Nacionalista	Re-elected in 1941.	1945–1946; Albuera, Bato, Baybay, Hilongos, Hindang, Inopacan, Matalom, Ormoc
#	Image	Member	Term of office		Congress	Party	Electoral history	Constituent LGUs
#	Image	Member	Start	End	Congress	Party	Electoral history	Constituent LGUs
=== Leyte's 2nd district for the House of Representatives of the Philippines ===
8		Domingo Veloso	May 25, 1946	December 30, 1957	1st	Liberal	Elected in 1946.	1946–1953; Albuera, Bato, Baybay, Hilongos, Hindang, Inopacan, Matalom, Ormoc
8		Domingo Veloso	May 25, 1946	December 30, 1957	2nd	Liberal	Re-elected in 1949.	1946–1953; Albuera, Bato, Baybay, Hilongos, Hindang, Inopacan, Matalom, Ormoc
8		Domingo Veloso	May 25, 1946	December 30, 1957	3rd	Democratic	Re-elected in 1953.	1953–1961; Albuera, Bato, Baybay, Hilongos, Hindang, Inopacan, Kananga, Matalom, Ormoc
(7)		Dominador Tan	December 30, 1957	December 30, 1961	4th	Nacionalista	Elected in 1957. Redistricted to the 4th district.	1953–1961; Albuera, Bato, Baybay, Hilongos, Hindang, Inopacan, Kananga, Matalom, Ormoc
9		Primo A. Villasin	December 30, 1961	December 30, 1965	5th	Liberal	Elected in 1961.	1961–1972; Alangalang, Barugo, Burauen, Capoocan, Carigara, Dagami, Jaro, Julita, La Paz, Pastrana, Tabontabon, Tunga
10		Salud Vivero Parreño	December 30, 1965	December 27, 1969	6th	Nacionalista	Elected in 1965.	1961–1972; Alangalang, Barugo, Burauen, Capoocan, Carigara, Dagami, Jaro, Julita, La Paz, Pastrana, Tabontabon, Tunga
10		Salud Vivero Parreño	December 30, 1965	December 27, 1969	7th	Nacionalista	Re-elected in 1969. Died before start of term.	1961–1972; Alangalang, Barugo, Burauen, Capoocan, Carigara, Dagami, Jaro, Julita, La Paz, Pastrana, Tabontabon, Tunga
District dissolved into the ten-seat Region VIII's at-large district for the Interim Batasang Pambansa, followed by the five-seat Leyte's at-large district for the Regular Batasang Pambansa.
District re-created February 2, 1987.
11		Manuel L. Horca Jr.	June 30, 1987	June 30, 1992	8th	PDP–Laban	Elected in 1987.	1987–present Barugo, Burauen, Capoocan, Carigara, Dagami, Dulag, Jaro, Julita, La Paz, MacArthur, Mayorga, Pastrana, Tabontabon, Tunga
12		Sergio Apostol	June 30, 1992	June 30, 2001	9th	Lakas	Elected in 1992.	1987–present Barugo, Burauen, Capoocan, Carigara, Dagami, Dulag, Jaro, Julita, La Paz, MacArthur, Mayorga, Pastrana, Tabontabon, Tunga
12		Sergio Apostol	June 30, 1992	June 30, 2001	10th	Lakas	Re-elected in 1995.	1987–present Barugo, Burauen, Capoocan, Carigara, Dagami, Dulag, Jaro, Julita, La Paz, MacArthur, Mayorga, Pastrana, Tabontabon, Tunga
12		Sergio Apostol	June 30, 1992	June 30, 2001	11th	Lakas	Re-elected in 1998.	1987–present Barugo, Burauen, Capoocan, Carigara, Dagami, Dulag, Jaro, Julita, La Paz, MacArthur, Mayorga, Pastrana, Tabontabon, Tunga
13		Trinidad G. Apostol	June 30, 2001	June 30, 2010	12th	Lakas	Elected in 2001.	1987–present Barugo, Burauen, Capoocan, Carigara, Dagami, Dulag, Jaro, Julita, La Paz, MacArthur, Mayorga, Pastrana, Tabontabon, Tunga
13		Trinidad G. Apostol	June 30, 2001	June 30, 2010	13th	Lakas	Re-elected in 2004.	1987–present Barugo, Burauen, Capoocan, Carigara, Dagami, Dulag, Jaro, Julita, La Paz, MacArthur, Mayorga, Pastrana, Tabontabon, Tunga
13		Trinidad G. Apostol	June 30, 2001	June 30, 2010	14th	Lakas	Re-elected in 2007.	1987–present Barugo, Burauen, Capoocan, Carigara, Dagami, Dulag, Jaro, Julita, La Paz, MacArthur, Mayorga, Pastrana, Tabontabon, Tunga
(12)		Sergio Apostol	June 30, 2010	June 30, 2016	15th	Lakas	Elected in 2010.	1987–present Barugo, Burauen, Capoocan, Carigara, Dagami, Dulag, Jaro, Julita, La Paz, MacArthur, Mayorga, Pastrana, Tabontabon, Tunga
(12)		Sergio Apostol	June 30, 2010	June 30, 2016	16th	Liberal	Re-elected in 2013.	1987–present Barugo, Burauen, Capoocan, Carigara, Dagami, Dulag, Jaro, Julita, La Paz, MacArthur, Mayorga, Pastrana, Tabontabon, Tunga
14		Henry Ong	June 30, 2016	June 30, 2019	17th	PDP–Laban	Elected in 2016.	1987–present Barugo, Burauen, Capoocan, Carigara, Dagami, Dulag, Jaro, Julita, La Paz, MacArthur, Mayorga, Pastrana, Tabontabon, Tunga
15		Lolita Javier	June 30, 2019	Incumbent	18th	PFP	Elected in 2019.	1987–present Barugo, Burauen, Capoocan, Carigara, Dagami, Dulag, Jaro, Julita, La Paz, MacArthur, Mayorga, Pastrana, Tabontabon, Tunga
15		Lolita Javier	June 30, 2019	Incumbent	19th	Nacionalista	Re-elected in 2022.	1987–present Barugo, Burauen, Capoocan, Carigara, Dagami, Dulag, Jaro, Julita, La Paz, MacArthur, Mayorga, Pastrana, Tabontabon, Tunga
15		Lolita Javier	June 30, 2019	Incumbent	20th	NPC	Re-elected in 2025.	1987–present Barugo, Burauen, Capoocan, Carigara, Dagami, Dulag, Jaro, Julita, La Paz, MacArthur, Mayorga, Pastrana, Tabontabon, Tunga

== Election results ==
=== 2025 ===
2025 Philippine House of Representatives elections
Party	Candidate	Votes	%
Nacionalista	Lolita Javier	177,875	80.03%
Independent	Alberto Hidalgo	44,387	19.97%
Total votes		222,262	100.00%
Nacionalista hold			

=== 2022 ===
2022 Philippine House of Representatives elections
Party	Candidate	Votes	%
Nacionalista	Lolita Javier	151,617	71.05%
PDP–Laban	Henry Ong	54,343	25.46%
Independent	Alberto Hidalgo	5,215	2.44%
PFP	Dominic Babante	2,229	1.04%
Total votes		213,404	100.00%
Nacionalista hold			

=== 2019 ===
2019 Philippine House of Representatives elections
Party	Candidate	Votes	%
PFP	Lolita Javier	112,989	55.39%
PDP–Laban	Henry Ong (incumbent)	88,995	43.63%
Independent	Alberto Hidalgo	1,509	0.74%
Independent	Nicco Villasin	484	0.24%
Total votes		203,977	100.00%
PFP gain from PDP–Laban			

=== 2016 ===
2016 Philippine House of Representatives elections
Party	Candidate	Votes	%
NPC	Henry Ong	95,534	52.64%
Liberal	Sergio Antonio Apostol	82,768	45.60%
Independent	Alberto Hidalgo	2,249	1.24%
PDP–Laban	Gary Ramos	943	0.52%
Valid ballots		181,494	85.43%
Margin of victory		12,766	7.03%
Invalid or blank votes		30,951	14.57%
Total votes		212,445	100.00%
NPC gain from Liberal			

=== 2013 ===
2013 Philippine House of Representatives elections
Party	Candidate	Votes	%
Liberal	Sergio Apostol	71,018	44.86
Tingog Leytenon	Edgardo Enerlan	34,025	21.49
PDP–Laban	Alberto Hidalgo	9,470	5.98
Margin of victory		36,993	23.37%
Invalid or blank votes		43,809	27.67
Total votes		158,322	100.00
Liberal hold			

=== 2010 ===
2010 Philippine House of Representatives elections
Party	Candidate	Votes	%
Lakas–Kampi	Sergio Apostol	77,561	56.78
PDSP	Rustico Balderian	30,583	22.39
PMP	Ashley Alverio	13,095	9.59
Liberal	Alberto Hidalgo	9,157	6.70
Bangon Pilipinas	Pastro Trimor Jr.	1,988	1.46
Independent	Von Kaiser Soro	1,988	1.46
Independent	Bartolome Lawsin	1,012	0.74
Valid ballots		136,596	75.19
Invalid or blank votes		45,069	24.81
Total votes		181,665	100.00
Lakas–Kampi hold			

== See also ==
- Legislative districts of Leyte
