= Shiro Makino =

Japanese general (1893–1945)

- 牧野 四郎
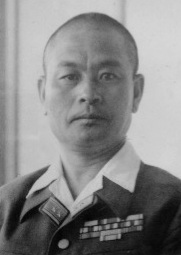
- Born: April 18, 1893
- Died: August 10, 1945 (aged 52)
- Military career
- Allegiance: Empire of Japan
- Branch: Imperial Japanese Army
- Rank: General
- Commands: IJA 16th Division
- Conflicts: World War II; Battle of Leyte

Shiro Makino (牧野 四郎, Makino Shirō; April 18, 1893 – August 10, 1945) was a Japanese general in the Imperial Japanese Army during World War II. Makino commanded the IJA 16th Division, an infantry division, in the Battle of Leyte. With only 620 men of the division surviving, he took responsibility for the annihilation of the division and committed suicide after the battle.
