= Leyte's at-large congressional district =

Legislative district of the Philippines

Leyte's at-large congressional district was the provincewide electoral district for Philippine national legislatures in both the undivided province of Leyte before its 1959 division and the northern three-fourths that retained its name from 1984 to 1986.

Leyte first elected its representatives at-large in the 1943 Philippine legislative election for a seat in the National Assembly of the Second Philippine Republic. Before 1943, the undivided island province which also included Biliran was represented in the national legislatures through its first, second, third, fourth and fifth districts. The undivided province was also earlier represented in the Malolos Congress of the First Philippine Republic in 1898 by appointed delegates from Luzon.

The five districts were restored in Leyte ahead of the 1941 Philippine House of Representatives elections whose elected representatives only began to serve following the dissolution of the Second Republic and the restoration of the Philippine Commonwealth in 1945. An at-large district would not be used in the province until the 1984 Philippine parliamentary election for five seats in the Batasang Pambansa, with a separate representation created for Southern Leyte which it had been entitled to since the 1959 division. It became obsolete following the 1987 reapportionment under a new constitution that restored the five districts in Leyte.

== Representation history ==
#	Term of office		National Assembly	Seat A				Seat B				Seat C				Seat D							
#	Start	End	National Assembly	Image	Member	Party	Electoral history	Image	Member	Party	Electoral history	Image	Member	Party	Electoral history	Image	Member	Party	Electoral history				
=== Leyte's at-large district for the Malolos Congress ===
District created June 18, 1898.
–	September 15, 1898	March 23, 1901	1st		Rafael Guerrero	Nonpartisan	Appointed.		Lucio Navarro	Nonpartisan	Appointed.		Simplicio del Rosario	Nonpartisan	Appointed.		Marciano Zamora	Nonpartisan	Appointed.				
#	Term of office		National Assembly	Seat A				Seat B				Seats eliminated											
#	Start	End	National Assembly	Image	Member	Party	Electoral history	Image	Member	Party	Electoral history	Seats eliminated											
=== Leyte's at-large district for the National Assembly (Second Philippine Republic) ===												Seats eliminated											
District re-created September 7, 1943.												Seats eliminated											
–	September 25, 1943	February 2, 1944	1st		José María Veloso	KALIBAPI	Elected in 1943.		Bernardo Torres	KALIBAPI	Appointed as an ex officio member.	Seats eliminated											
District dissolved into Leyte's 1st, 2nd, 3rd, 4th and 5th districts.												Seats eliminated											
#	Term of office		Batasang Pambansa	Seat A				Seat B				Seat C				Seat D				Seat E			
#	Start	End	Batasang Pambansa	Image	Member	Party	Electoral history	Image	Member	Party	Electoral history	Image	Member	Party	Electoral history	Image	Member	Party	Electoral history	Image	Member	Party	Electoral history
=== Leyte's at-large district for the Regular Batasang Pambansa ===
District re-created February 1, 1984.
–	July 23, 1984	March 25, 1986	2nd		Damian V. Aldaba	KBL	Elected in 1984.		Artemio E. Mate	KBL	Elected in 1984.		Emiliano J. Melgazo	KBL	Elected in 1984.		Benjamin Romualdez	KBL	Elected in 1984. Disqualified and remained as Philippine ambassador to the US.		Alberto S. Veloso	KBL	Elected in 1984.
District dissolved into Leyte's 1st, 2nd, 3rd, 4th and 5th districts.

== See also ==
- Legislative districts of Leyte
