= Domingo Veloso =

Filipino lawyer and politician

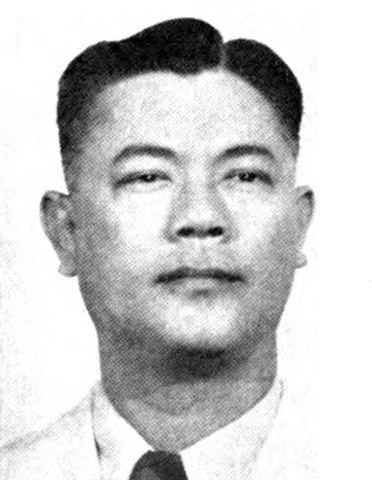
- Veloso's official portrait during the 3rd Congress

Speaker pro tempore of the House of Representatives of the Philippines
- In office December 30, 1949 – December 30, 1953
- Preceded by: Francisco Ortega
- Succeeded by: Daniel Romualdez

Member of the Philippine House of Representatives for Leyte's 2nd district
- In office May 25, 1946 – December 30, 1957
- Preceded by: Dominador Tan
- Succeeded by: Dominador Tan

Member of the 1971 Constitutional Convention for Leyte's 4th district
- In office June 1, 1971 – December 1, 1972

Personal details
- Born: Domingo Costas Veloso; December 14, 1908 Baybay, Leyte, Philippine Islands
- Died: April 21, 1980 (aged 71) Cebu City, Philippines
- Party: Liberal (1946–1953)
- Other political affiliations: Nacionalista–Democratic (1953–1957)
- Relations: Veloso family

Military service
- Allegiance: Philippines
- Branch/service: Philippine Commonwealth Army
- Rank: First lieutenant

Domingo Costas Veloso (December 14, 1908 – April 21, 1980) was a Filipino lawyer, military officer, and politician who represented Leyte's 2nd congressional district in the House of Representatives from 1946 to 1957. He served as speaker pro tempore of the House from 1949 to 1953 during the 2nd Congress.

== Early life and education ==
Veloso was born in Baybay, Leyte, on December 14, 1908. He earned a Bachelor of Laws degree and entered the practice of law after passing the Bar examinations.

== Career ==
Before entering government service, Veloso served in the Reserve Philippine Army as a first lieutenant in the Judge Advocate General's Service and as chief of the propaganda section of the Leyte Area Command during the Japanese occupation in World War II.

In 1946, Veloso was elected to the House of Representatives as the representative of Leyte's 2nd congressional district. He was re-elected to two additional terms, serving until 1957. During his second term, he was elected speaker pro tempore of the House under Speaker Eugenio Perez. He later ran for Leyte's 4th district in 1965 but lost to fellow Liberal Party candidate Dominador Tan.

Veloso was elected as a delegate from Leyte's 4th district to the 1971 Constitutional Convention, where he served as chairperson of the Committee on Legislative Power.

Veloso died on April 21, 1980.

== Electoral history ==
Electoral history of Domingo Veloso
Year	Office	Party	Votes received				Result
Year	Office	Party	Total	%	P.	Swing	Result
1946	Representative (Leyte–2nd)	Liberal	—N/a	—N/a	1st	—N/a	Won
1949	Representative (Leyte–2nd)	Liberal	—N/a	—N/a	1st	—N/a	Won
1953	Representative (Leyte–2nd)	Nacionalista–Democratic	18,121	50.80%	1st	—N/a	Won
1965	Representative (Leyte–4th)	Liberal	5,895	9.83%	3rd	—N/a	Lost
1970	Constitutional Convention Delegate (Leyte–4th)	Nonpartisan	—N/a	—N/a	—N/a	—N/a	Won

House of Representatives of the Philippines
Preceded by Francisco Ortega	Speaker pro tempore of the House of Representatives of the Philippines; December 30, 1949 – December 30, 1953	Succeeded by Daniel Romualdez
Preceded by Dominador Tan	Member of the Philippine House of Representatives for Leyte's 2nd district May 25, 1946 – December 30, 1957	Succeeded by Dominador Tan
