= Pastrana, Leyte =

Municipality in Leyte, Philippines

Pastrana
- Municipality
- Municipality of Pastrana
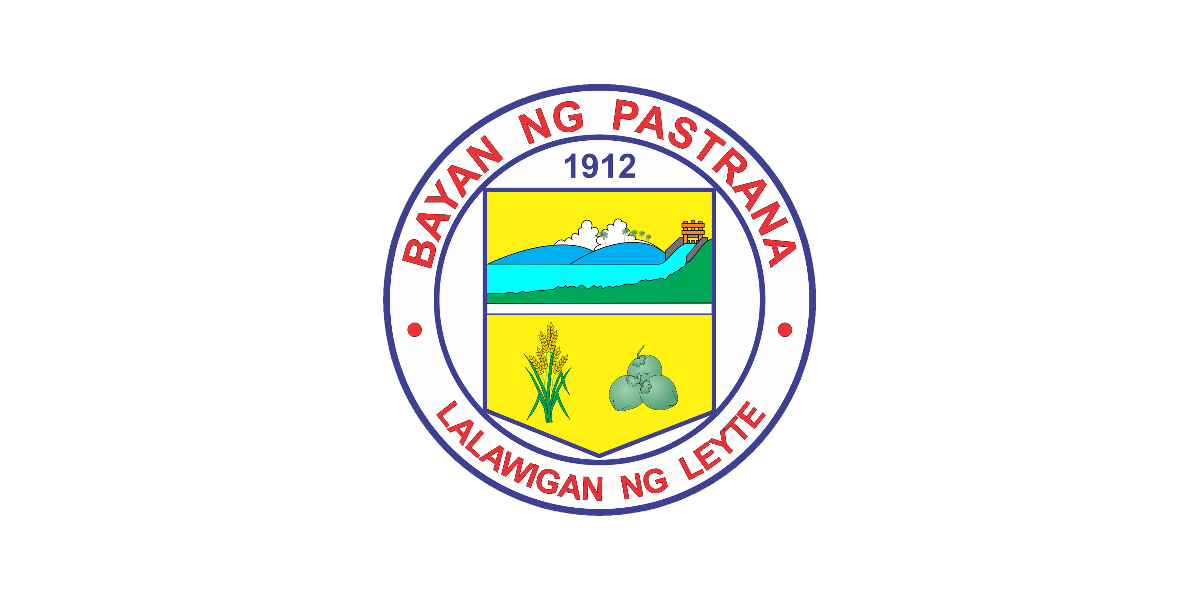
- Flag Seal

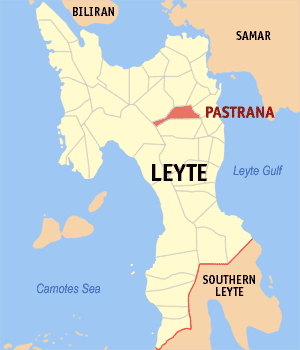
- Map of Leyte with Pastrana highlighted
- Interactive map of Pastrana
- Location within the Philippines
- Coordinates: 11°08′N 124°53′E
- Country: Philippines
- Region: Eastern Visayas
- Province: Leyte
- District: 2nd district
- Barangays: 29 (see Barangays)

Government
  - Type: Sangguniang Bayan
  - Mayor: Maritess Cayaco-Marcos
  - Vice Mayor: Chito Carian Cayaco
  - Representative: Lolita Tañala Javier
  - Councilors: List: • Elvira A. Bohol; • Federico M. Tan; • Rodel M. Tobilla; • Veronica S. Aures; • Chito C. Cayaco; • Alvin N. Opiniano; • Claudette Anne V. Chua; • Arnulfo R. Arellano; DILG Masterlist of Officials
  - Electorate: 15,287 voters (2025)

Area
  - Total: 86.35 km^{2} (33.34 sq mi)
- Elevation: 202 m (663 ft)
- Highest elevation: 1,320 m (4,330 ft)
- Lowest elevation: 0 m (0 ft)

Population (2024 census)
  - Total: 20,327
  - Density: 235.4/km^{2} (609.7/sq mi)
  - Households: 4,967

Economy
  - Income class: 4th municipal income class
  - Poverty incidence: 31.62% (2023)
  - Revenue: ₱ 128.2 million (2024)
  - Assets: ₱ 403.9 million (2024)
  - Expenditure: ₱ 98.91 million (2024)
  - Liabilities: ₱ 66.23 million (2024)

Service provider
  - Electricity: Leyte 3 Electric Cooperative (LEYECO 3)
- Time zone: UTC+8 (PST)
- ZIP code: 6514
- PSGC: 0803741000
- IDD : area code: +63 (0)53
- Native languages: Waray; Tagalog

Pastrana (IPA: [pɐs'trana]), officially the Municipality of Pastrana (Waray: Bungto han Pastrana; Tagalog: Bayan ng Pastrana), is a municipality in the province of Leyte, Philippines. According to the 2024 census, it has a population of 20,327 people.

== History ==
Prior to incorporation as a separate municipality, Pastrana was part of the municipality of Dagami.

Before the coming of the Spaniards, the settlement was called "Pamagpagan" because of the way the native inhabitants left their hair in disarray. In 1891, Captain Wenceslao Nielo, with the aid of a Spanish Franciscan friar by the name of Fr. Eusebio Ibanez, organized the settlement into a town and was transferred from Guinbaya-an to its present site. Father Ibanez blessed it with a holy mass. As a token of gratitude, the inhabitants called the town "Pastrana" in honor of Fr. Ibanez who was a native of Pastrana, Spain.

Shortly afterwards, parochial schools were established. At this time, the unit of local administration was the pueblo which embraced a number of barrios. The first gobernadorcillo was Captain Wenceslao Nielo. He was assisted in the administration of the pueblo by the "Guinhaupan," a group of men equivalent to the present councilors, by the "tenientes" and by the "Cabezas de barangay."

When the Philippine revolution broke out in 1898, the people fled to the mountains and for a time, the local government then headed by Andres Villablanca, was temporarily suspended. It was at this moment in the history of the town that Jorge Capili, a guerrilla leader, burned the whole town. By the year 1901, Gregorio Marquez was appointed municipal president. The Americans who occupied the whole country, stationed a detachment at Dagami. They came once in a while to Pastrana to look after the affairs of the little town. In 1903, the town was reverted into a barrio of Dagami due to inadequate finances.

Pastrana for a time remained a barrio of Dagami. In 1912, Agaton Villablanca worked for the establishment of the barrio to a municipality so that its former status was finally regained. In gratitude, the people appointed Agaton Villablanca president. After five years when the first municipal election was held, Agaton Villablanca retained his leadership of the municipal government.

When the Japanese occupied Pastrana in 1942, the people secretly fled to the mountains. The incumbent mayor also evacuated and his elder brother took his place. The Japanese did not stay long. The guerillas burned down the buildings and for some time there were no Japanese in the town. But in 1943, the Japanese returned, this time for long, for the soldiers constructed a garrison. The Japanese invaders ordered the civilians to live in the town proper. For two long years, the town residents suffered severely under the Japanese oppression.

In 1944 when the American liberation forces drove out the Japanese, Francisco Villablanca, who was the pre-war mayor, automatically resumed his position and under him, the town was restored to its former status as a peaceful community.

At present, Pastrana is fast progressing in the agricultural field because of the biggest gravity irrigation system in eastern Visayas, located at Barrio Tingib, lacing the whole municipality with irrigation canals. A direct road to Palo as well as feeder roads have been constructed. The Binaha-an Dam provides an ideal picnic site with the stately Amandawing mountain in the background.

== Geography ==
Sometimes referred to as the "land of the fairies," Pastrana is an interior town of the province.

Geographically, it is in the southwestern part of Leyte, and about 27 kilometres (17 mi) from Tacloban City. Its rice fields and coconut plantations are the main assets of the place. The climate is cool and the soil fertile.

The water system at Tingib is designed to supply Tacloban and neighboring municipalities.

=== Barangays ===
Pastrana is politically subdivided into 29 barangays. Each barangay consists of puroks and some have sitios.

- Arabunog
- Aringit
- Bahay
- Cabaohan
- Calsadahay
- Cancaraja
- Canino-an
- Capilla
- Colawen
- Dumarag
- Guindapunan
- Halaba
- Jones
- Lanawan
- Lima
- Lourdes
- Macalpi-ay
- Malitbogay
- Manaybanay
- Maricum
- Patong
- District 1 (Poblacion)
- District 2 (Poblacion)
- District 3 (Poblacion)
- District 4 (Poblacion)
- Sapsap
- Socsocon
- Tingib
- Yapad

=== Climate ===
Climate data for Pastrana, Leyte
Month	Jan	Feb	Mar	Apr	May	Jun	Jul	Aug	Sep	Oct	Nov	Dec	Year
Mean daily maximum °C (°F)	28 (82)	28 (82)	29 (84)	30 (86)	30 (86)	29 (84)	29 (84)	29 (84)	29 (84)	29 (84)	29 (84)	28 (82)	29 (84)
Mean daily minimum °C (°F)	22 (72)	22 (72)	22 (72)	23 (73)	24 (75)	25 (77)	25 (77)	25 (77)	25 (77)	24 (75)	24 (75)	23 (73)	24 (75)
Average precipitation mm (inches)	78 (3.1)	57 (2.2)	84 (3.3)	79 (3.1)	118 (4.6)	181 (7.1)	178 (7.0)	169 (6.7)	172 (6.8)	180 (7.1)	174 (6.9)	128 (5.0)	1,598 (62.9)
Average rainy days	16.7	13.8	17.3	18.5	23.2	26.5	27.1	26.0	26.4	27.5	24.6	21.0	268.6
Source: Meteoblue

== Demographics ==
Population census of Pastrana

Year	Pop.	±% p.a.
1903	4,308	—
1918	6,533	+2.81%
1939	8,078	+1.02%
1948	7,787	−0.41%
1960	8,794	+1.02%
1970	9,676	+0.96%
1975	10,746	+2.13%
1980	10,854	+0.20%

Year	Pop.	±% p.a.
1990	12,565	+1.47%
1995	14,442	+2.64%
2000	14,351	−0.14%
2007	16,008	+1.52%
2010	16,649	+1.44%
2015	18,002	+1.50%
2020	19,359	+1.54%
2024	20,327	+1.18%

Source: Philippine Statistics Authority

In the 2024 census, the population of Pastrana, was 20,327 people, with a density of 240 inhabitants per square kilometre or 620 inhabitants per square mile.

== Economy ==
Poverty incidence of Pastrana (%)

Source: Philippine Statistics Authority

== Local Government ==
2025-2028 Pastrana, Leyte Officials
Position	Name	Party
Mayor	Maritess C. Marcos	NPC
Vice Mayor	Chito C. Cayaco	NPC
Councilors	Gerardo S. Carian	NPC
Councilors	Angelina C. Diola	NPC
Councilors	Loida B. Villablanca	NPC
Councilors	Nathan G. Letrodo	NPC
Councilors	Alex C. Sequito	NPC
Councilors	Pio M. Tan	NPC
Councilors	Nicole Marie C. Marcos	NPC
Councilors	Rodel M. Tobilla	Independent
Ex Officio Municipal Council Members
ABC President	TBD	Nonpartisan
SK Federation President	TBD	Nonpartisan
