= Lolita Javier =

Filipino politician

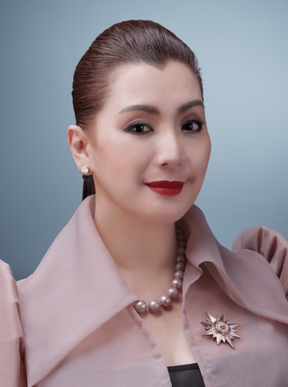
- Official portrait, 2025

Member of the House of Representatives from Leyte's 2nd congressional district
- Incumbent
- Assumed office June 30, 2019
- Preceded by: Henry Ong

Personal details
- Born: Lolita Tierro Tañala; February 20, 1975 (age 51) Jaro, Leyte, Philippines
- Party: NPC (2025–present)
- Other political affiliations: Nacionalista (2021–2025); PFP (2018–2021)
- Spouse: Leonardo Javier Jr.
- Relatives: Danny Javier (brother-in-law)
- Occupation: Politician

Lolita Tañala-Javier (born February 20, 1975) is a Filipino politician serving as the representative of Leyte's 2nd congressional district. She is married to Leonardo Javier Jr., the current vice governor of Leyte and the founder of the Andok's food chain.

== Career ==
Born in 1975, Javier previously worked as a ramp model. She married businessman Leonardo "Sandy" Javier Jr., the founder of Andok's and future vice governor of Leyte. In 2019, she entered politics as candidate for representative of the 2nd district of Leyte under the Partido Federal ng Pilipinas (PFP). She won, defeating one-term congressman Henry Ong of PDP–Laban.

Javier ran for re-election in 2022 as a member of the Nacionalista Party. She defeated Ong in a rematch, this time with a wider margin, while her son Jassie Tañala won as mayor of Jaro, Leyte against former mayor Rolando Celebre.

== Electoral history ==
Electoral history of Lolita Javier
Year	Office	Party	Votes received				Result
Year	Office	Party	Total	%	P.	Swing	Result
2019	Representative (Leyte–2nd)	PFP	112,989	55.39%	1st	—N/a	Won
2022	Representative (Leyte–2nd)	Nacionalista	151,617	71.05%	1st	+15.66	Won
2025	Representative (Leyte–2nd)	Nacionalista	177,875	80.03%	1st	+8.98	Won
