= Julita, Leyte =

Municipality in Leyte, Philippines

Julita
- Municipality
- Municipality of Julita
- Flag Seal

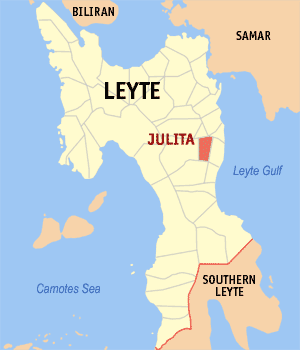
- Map of Leyte with Julita highlighted
- Interactive map of Julita
- Location within the Philippines
- Coordinates: 10°58′23″N 124°57′44″E
- Country: Philippines
- Region: Eastern Visayas
- Province: Leyte
- District: 2nd district
- Barangays: 26 (see Barangays)

Government
  - Type: Sangguniang Bayan
  - Mayor: Irvin R. Dy (NPC)
  - Vice Mayor: Jude Andrei M. Romualdez (Aksyon)
  - Representative: Lolita T. Javier (Nacionalista)
  - Councilors: List: • Felicidad T. Espinosa; • Benjie S. Lagarto; • Romulo G. Donghit Jr.; • Aliana Marie R. Tubi; • Allan T. Novales; • Allan Christian V. Agaba; • Mark Joy E. Macaso; • Enrico E. Duquiatan; DILG Masterlist of Officials
  - Electorate: 11,450 voters (2025)

Area
  - Total: 53.30 km^{2} (20.58 sq mi)
- Elevation: 39 m (128 ft)
- Highest elevation: 570 m (1,870 ft)
- Lowest elevation: 0 m (0 ft)

Population (2024 census)
  - Total: 16,053
  - Density: 301.2/km^{2} (780.1/sq mi)
  - Households: 4,372

Economy
  - Income class: 4th municipal income class
  - Poverty incidence: 26.76% (2023)
  - Revenue: ₱ 128.9 million (2024)
  - Assets: ₱ 412 million (2024)
  - Expenditure: ₱ 114.2 million (2024)
  - Liabilities: ₱ 54.68 million (2024)

Service provider
  - Electricity: Don Orestes Romualdez Electric Coperative (DORELCO)
- Time zone: UTC+8 (PST)
- ZIP code: 6506
- PSGC: 0803725000
- IDD : area code: +63 (0)53
- Native languages: Waray; Tagalog

Julita (IPA: [hu'lɪtɐ]), officially the Municipality of Julita (Waray: Bungto han Julita; Tagalog: Bayan ng Julita), is a municipality in the province of Leyte, Philippines. According to the 2024 census, it has a population of 16,053 people.

Julita is 47 kilometers from Tacloban, the capital city of Eastern Visayas. It is located between the municipalities of Dulag and Burauen.

The municipality of Julita was created through Presidential Executive Order No. 278 in 1949 under President Elpidio Quirino. Making it the second town after La Paz that parted its way to become independent from its maiden town Burauen.

Agriculture is the main industry in the area, especially rice and coconut production. About 70% of the working population is engaged in agriculture. Most live below the poverty line, and many lack basic necessities of life.

== Geography ==
=== Barangays ===
Julita is politically subdivided into 26 barangays. Each barangay consists of puroks and some have sitios.

- Alegria
- Anibong
- Aslum
- Balante
- Bongdo
- Bonifacio
- Bugho
- Calbasag
- Caridad
- Cuya-e
- Dita
- Gitabla
- Hindang
- Inawangan
- Jurao
- Poblacion District I
- Poblacion District II
- Poblacion District III
- Poblacion District IV
- San Andres
- San Pablo
- Santa Cruz
- Santo Niño
- Tagkip
- Tolosahay
- Villa Hermosa

=== Climate ===
Climate data for Julita, Leyte
Month	Jan	Feb	Mar	Apr	May	Jun	Jul	Aug	Sep	Oct	Nov	Dec	Year
Mean daily maximum °C (°F)	28 (82)	28 (82)	29 (84)	30 (86)	30 (86)	30 (86)	29 (84)	29 (84)	29 (84)	29 (84)	29 (84)	28 (82)	29 (84)
Mean daily minimum °C (°F)	22 (72)	22 (72)	22 (72)	23 (73)	25 (77)	25 (77)	25 (77)	25 (77)	25 (77)	24 (75)	24 (75)	23 (73)	24 (75)
Average precipitation mm (inches)	78 (3.1)	57 (2.2)	84 (3.3)	79 (3.1)	118 (4.6)	181 (7.1)	178 (7.0)	169 (6.7)	172 (6.8)	180 (7.1)	174 (6.9)	128 (5.0)	1,598 (62.9)
Average rainy days	16.7	13.8	17.3	18.5	23.2	26.5	27.1	26.0	26.4	27.5	24.6	21.0	268.6
Source: Meteoblue

== Demographics ==
Population census of Julita

Year	Pop.	±% p.a.
1960	9,112	—
1970	9,307	+0.21%
1975	9,445	+0.30%
1980	9,724	+0.58%
1990	9,944	+0.22%
1995	11,671	+3.05%

Year	Pop.	±% p.a.
2000	12,096	+0.77%
2007	12,310	+0.24%
2010	13,307	+2.87%
2015	15,114	+2.45%
2020	15,598	+0.67%
2024	16,053	+0.69%

Source: Philippine Statistics Authority

In the 2024 census, the population of Julita was 16,053 people, with a density of 300 inhabitants per square kilometre or 780 inhabitants per square mile.

== Economy ==
Poverty incidence of Julita (%)

Source: Philippine Statistics Authority

== Government ==
2025-2028 Julita, Leyte Officials
Position	Name	Party
Mayor	Irvin R. Dy	NPC
Vice Mayor	Jude Andrei M. Romualdez	Aksyon
Councilors	Felicidad T. Espinosa	NPC
Councilors	Benjie S. Lagarto	NPC
Councilors	Romulo G. Donghit Jr.	Independent
Councilors	Aliana Marie R. Tubi	NPC
Councilors	Allan T. Novales	Independent
Councilors	Allan Christian V. Agaba	NPC
Councilors	Mark Joy E. Macaso	Independent
Councilors	Enrico E. Duquiatan	Independent
Ex Officio Municipal Council Members
ABC President	TBD	Nonpartisan
SK Federation President	TBD	Nonpartisan
