= Jaro, Leyte =

Municipality in Leyte, Philippines

Jaro
- Municipality
- Municipality of Jaro
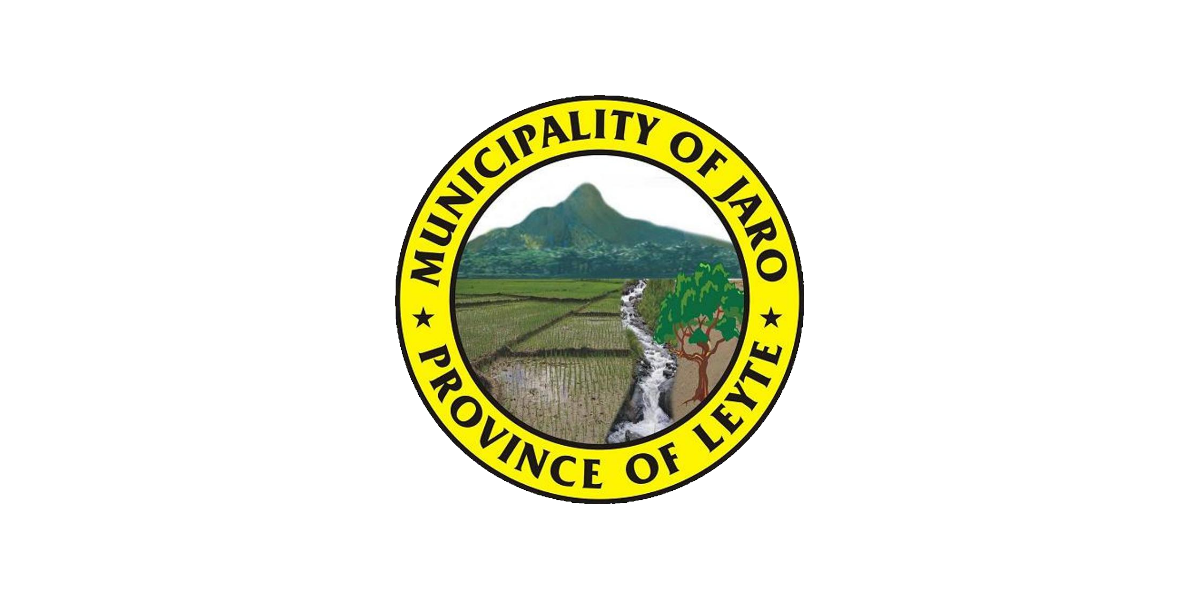
- Flag
- Nickname: Bungto han mga Salugnon
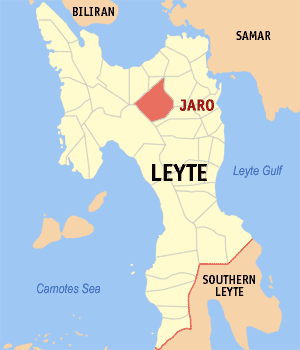
- Map of Leyte with Jaro highlighted
- Interactive map of Jaro
- Location within the Philippines
- Coordinates: 11°11′22″N 124°47′07″E
- Country: Philippines
- Region: Eastern Visayas
- Province: Leyte
- District: 2nd district
- Barangays: 46 (see Barangays)

Government
  - Type: Sangguniang Bayan
  - Mayor: Jassie Lou Tañala (NPC)
  - Vice Mayor: Pedro B. Tañala Jr. (NPC)
  - Representative: Lolita Javier (Nacionalista)
  - Councilors: List: • Rey P. Aure; • Lanulfo M. Borja; • Francisco R. Altres; • Raul A. Macanda; • Benjamin H. Gariando Jr.; • Teofilo Cabello; • Carmencita G. Tañala; • Alma A. Tamayo
  - Electorate: 32,062 voters (2025)

Area
  - Total: 207.19 km^{2} (80.00 sq mi)
- Elevation: 77 m (253 ft)
- Highest elevation: 250 m (820 ft)
- Lowest elevation: 29 m (95 ft)

Population (2024 census)
  - Total: 44,643
  - Density: 215.47/km^{2} (558.06/sq mi)
  - Households: 10,706
- Demonym: Jaron-on

Economy
  - Income class: 1st municipal income class
  - Poverty incidence: 33.45% (2023)
  - Revenue: ₱ 238.2 million (2024)
  - Assets: ₱ 809 million (2024)
  - Expenditure: ₱ 212.6 million (2024)
  - Liabilities: ₱ 151.6 million (2024)

Service provider
  - Electricity: Leyte 3 Electric Cooperative (LEYECO 3)
- Time zone: UTC+8 (PST)
- ZIP code: 6527
- PSGC: 0803723000
- IDD : area code: +63 (0)53
- Native languages: Waray; Tagalog
- Website: www.jaro-leyte.gov.ph

Jaro (IPA: ['haɾo]), officially the Municipality of Jaro (Waray: Bungto han Jaro; Tagalog: Bayan ng Jaro), is a First Income Class municipality in the province of Leyte, Philippines. According to the 2024 census, it has a population of 44,643 people.

== History ==
In the early time of the Spanish regime, the section where the Jaro is situated today was a lush forest enjoying its primitive freedom undisturbed by human beings.

In those days, struggles between Christianity and Mohammedanism took place. Datu Buisan and Sirungan led one of the Moro expeditions. They came to the Visayas leading a fleet of colorful moro vintas razing Christian towns to the ground, killing the inhabitants and taking some as slaves. Christians had to unite against the invaders and this was how Jaro came into being.

There were two Leyteños known far and wide for their skill with the native arms and bravery in wars. These two men were Bonsilao of Ormoc and Sinirungan of Dagami. These two men were so strong that the people concluded that they possessed supernatural powers. This belief was strengthened by the fact that they managed to drive the Moros away. Later, the two men decided to settle in a centrally located place where they could easily give aid to the beleaguered Christians especially the inhabitants of Balugu, Kalgara and the neighboring towns. An ideal place was finally found. This was atop a hill and this same hill is where the parochial church of Jaro is situated. As time went by, the place was consequently cleared and homes were built. Small crooked paths were widened and thus a town was born.

The legendary background of this municipality has been for the most part connected with the surging Cabayongan River, which crisscrosses the town. This river had served the inhabitants in many ways, becoming as it were the flesh and blood of the community. As historical data points out, the municipality of Jaro was once called “Salug,” a proximate location to the Cabayongan River. Its fertile soil and abundant fruit-bearing trees contributed immensely to its early growth and expansion. It became a “visita” because of the periodic baptismal visit regularly made by the priest coming from the town of Barugo. This “visita” became the second name of the municipality of Jaro.

In later years, the village became the centrifuge of people coming from the outlying districts and regions due to a running well found at the foot of the hill where the present church now stands, the water of which was believed to be medicinal because of herbs whose roots were leading to the well. The old folks termed the mixture of the herbs from the hill as “Haro,” a medicinal potent drug supposed to cure all kinds of afflictions and diseases. People from near and far municipalities flocked to this place to be treated.

Thus, ultimately, the word “Haro” became a by-word among the people as seen in the first Murillo-Velarde Map published in 1734 and later on used to denote the name of the place when it became a municipality in 1851. When the Spaniards came, “Haro” was transcribed as “Jaro”.

Notre Dame of Jaro, a Catholic school run by the sisters of the Oblates of Notre Dame, is located in Jaro.

== Geography ==
=== Barangays ===
Jaro is politically subdivided into 46 barangays. Each barangay consists of puroks and some have sitios.

- Alahag
- Anibongon
- Atipolo
- Badiang
- Batug
- Bias-Zabala
- Buenavista
- Bukid
- Burabod
- Buri
- Caglawaan
- Canapu-an
- Canhandugan (formerly San Francisco Javier)
- Crossing Rubas
- Daro
- District I (Poblacion)
- District II (Poblacion)
- District III (Poblacion)
- District IV (Poblacion)
- Hiagsam
- Hibucawan
- Hibunawon (formerly Islabay)
- Kalinawan
- La Paz
- Licod
- Macanip
- Macopa
- Mag-aso
- Malobago
- Olotan
- Palanog (formerly Mooc)
- Pange
- Parasan
- Pitogo
- Sagkahan
- San Agustin
- San Pedro
- San Roque
- Santa Cruz
- Santo Niño
- Sari-Sari
- Tinambacan
- Tuba
- Uguiao
- Villa Conzoilo (Villa Consuelo)
- Villa Paz

=== Climate ===
Climate data for Jaro, Leyte
Month	Jan	Feb	Mar	Apr	May	Jun	Jul	Aug	Sep	Oct	Nov	Dec	Year
Mean daily maximum °C (°F)	28 (82)	28 (82)	29 (84)	30 (86)	30 (86)	29 (84)	29 (84)	29 (84)	29 (84)	29 (84)	28 (82)	28 (82)	29 (84)
Mean daily minimum °C (°F)	22 (72)	21 (70)	22 (72)	23 (73)	24 (75)	24 (75)	24 (75)	24 (75)	24 (75)	24 (75)	23 (73)	22 (72)	23 (74)
Average precipitation mm (inches)	73 (2.9)	56 (2.2)	75 (3.0)	71 (2.8)	114 (4.5)	174 (6.9)	172 (6.8)	163 (6.4)	167 (6.6)	161 (6.3)	158 (6.2)	125 (4.9)	1,509 (59.5)
Average rainy days	15.2	12.5	16.2	17.3	23.9	27.3	28.4	26.9	26.9	27.1	23.8	19.3	264.8
Source: Meteoblue

== Government ==
=== Mayors ===
No.	Mayor	Period
1	Prudencio Fevidal	1946–1947
2	Zoilo Trota	1947–1951
3	Abdon Relevo	1952–1955
(2)	Zoilo Trota	1956–1959
4	Marcelo Cabelin	1960–1963
5	Adriano Villamor	1964–1983
6	Juan Arbas	1983–1986
7	Marietta Porciuncula (OIC)	1987–1988
8	Rufo Ribo	1988–1994
9	Pablito Quiñones	1994–2002
10	Floro Katangkatang	2002–2007
11	Rolando Celebre	2007–2016
12	Zharina Celebre	2016–2019
13	Rodrigo Arbas	2019–2022
14	Jassie Tañala	2022–present

=== Current officials (2025–2028) ===
Position	Name	Party
Mayor	Jassie Lou Tañala	NPC
Vice Mayor	Pedro Lolito B. Tañala Jr.	NPC
Councilors	Francisco R. Altres	NPC
Councilors	Rey P. Aure	NPC
Councilors	Lanulfo M. Borja	NPC
Councilors	Teofilo Cabello	NPC
Councilors	Benjamin H. Gariando Jr.	NPC
Councilors	Raul A. Macanda	NPC
Councilors	Alma A. Tamayo	NPC
Councilors	Carmencita G. Tañala	NPC
Ex Officio Municipal Council Members
ABC President	Zandro T. Morabe	Nonpartisan
SK Federation President	Vianca Mae N. Familar	Nonpartisan

== Demographics ==
Population census of Jaro

Year	Pop.	±% p.a.
1903	11,066	—
1918	17,276	+3.01%
1939	23,914	+1.56%
1948	19,650	−2.16%
1960	32,243	+4.21%
1970	29,599	−0.85%
1975	30,987	+0.92%
1980	29,739	−0.82%

Year	Pop.	±% p.a.
1990	31,727	+0.65%
1995	32,726	+0.58%
2000	37,437	+2.93%
2007	38,797	+0.49%
2010	39,577	+0.73%
2015	43,199	+1.68%
2020	43,758	+0.27%
2024	44,643	+0.48%

Source: Philippine Statistics Authority

In the 2024 census, the population of Jaro was 44,643 people, with a density of 220 inhabitants per square kilometre or 570 inhabitants per square mile.

== Economy ==
Poverty incidence of Jaro (%)

Source: Philippine Statistics Authority

== Education ==
There are a total of 42 elementary schools and 5 high schools in Jaro, Leyte:

=== Elementary Schools ===
- Alahag Elementary School
- Anibongon Elementary School
- Atipolo Elementary School
- Badiang Elementary School
- Batug Elementary School
- Buenavista Elementary School
- Bukid Elementary School
- Burabod Elementary School
- Buri Elementary School
- Caglawaan Elementary School
- Canapu-an Elementary School
- Canhandugan Elementary School
- Daro Elementary School
- Granja Central School
- Hiagsam Elementary School
- Hibucawan Elementary School
- Hibunawon Elementary School
- Jaro I Central School
- La Paz Primary School
- Lorenzo C. Macayan Elementary School
- Licod Elementary School
- Macanip Elementary School
- Macopa Elementary School
- Mag-aso Elementary School
- Malobago Elementary School
- Montejo Mendiola Memorial Elementary School
- Pange Elementary School
- Parasan Elementary School
- Pitogo Elementary School
- Rubas Elementary School
- Sagkahan Elementary School
- San Agustin Elementary School
- San Pedro Primary School
- San Roque Elementary School
- Sari-sari Primary School
- Santa Cruz Elementary School
- Santo Nino Elementary School
- Tinambacan Elementary School
- Tuba Elementary School
- Uguiao Elementary School
- Villa Conzoilo Primary School
- Zabala Elementary School

=== Secondary/High School ===
- Agapito Amado Memorial National High School
- Granja-Kalinawan National High School
- Granja-Kalinawan NHS — Poblacion 1 Annex
- Granja-Kalinawan NHS — Hiagsam Annex
- Granja-Kalinawan NHS — Uguiao Annex
- Teofilo R. Macaso Memorial National High School
- Notre Dame of Jaro, Inc.
