= Fernando Buyser =

Pre-war writer, bishop, and poet in Cebuano

Monsignor Fernando Buyser
- Born: Fernando Buyser y Aquino; May 30, 1879; Merida, Leyte, Captaincy General of the Philippines
- Died: November 16, 1946 (aged 67); Mainit, Surigao, Philippines
- Resting place: Tubod, Surigao del Norte
- Occupations: Poet; writer; folklorist; bishop
- Spouse: Doña Bruna Aranas
- Writing career
- Pen name: List of Pen names: Floripinas; Alibangbang (Butterfly); Buddy; Paring Bayot (Gay Priest)
- Language: Cebuano
- Genres: Romantic poetry, pastoral poetry, nationalistic, mystical
- Aglipayan Bishop
- Church: Philippine Independent Church (Iglesia Filipina Independiente)
- Other post: Chairperson of the IFI Supreme Council of Bishops

Orders
- Ordination: 1905; (Priesthood) by Jose Evangelista
- Consecration: 1930; (Episcopate) by Gregorio Aglipay

Fernando Buyser y Aquino, also known by his pseudonym Floripinas (May 30, 1879 – November 16, 1946), was a Filipino Visayan poet, writer, and bishop of the Philippine Independent Church. He was a prolific writer and best known as the inventor of the Cebuano sonnet form called sonanoy and as a pioneer in the study of Visayan folklore.

== Early life ==
Fernando A. Buyser was born to a wealthy family of Don Gregorio Buyser y Virgeneza and Doña Eugenia Aquino y Gumba on May 30, 1879 in Kalunangan (known previously as Nazaret) in the town of Merida in the province of Leyte. He was the youngest of 10 siblings namely: Pedro, Toribio, Vicente, Marta, Victor, Sergia, Felicidad, Maria, and Esperanza. He grew up in Caridad, which was formerly called Makahila, in the town of Baybay, Leyte.

=== Philippine revolutions ===
Buyser, who was 17 years old, became secretary to the Leyte guerilla force leader, Laureano Kabilin during the Philippine Revolution of 1896. During the Philippine-American War, he served under the commands of Filipino revolutionary leaders Pedro Samson, Pablo Vivira, and Joaquin Flordelis. He also was responsible in organizing the guerilla units in the towns of Inopakan, Hindang, and Hilongos in Leyte.

== Priesthood ==
After the revolutions, Buyser became a schoolteacher in Hibakungan, Hilongos and was engaged in various trades including a stint as an officer in San Rafael II, an inter-island ship. After finishing his studies to be a priest in a seminary of the Philippine Independent Church (IFI), he was ordained by Manila Bishop Jose Evangelista in 1905 and then assigned in the towns of Almeria, Leyte and Placer, Surigao. Later, he married fellow poet Doña Bruna Aranas in Leyte, becoming the first homegrown IFI religious priest to be wed.

In 1930, he was ordained bishop by Gregorio Aglipay and this new role allowed him to travel in Visayas and Mindanao as well as to help in the religious reforms initiated by Aglipay. He became the bishop of the provinces of Cebu, Bohol, Leyte, Samar, Masbate, and Surigao and the head of the Venerable Supreme Council of Bishops of the church.

== Writing ==
He compiled Cebuano traditional oral poetry and old verse forms, which he published in anthologies that were considered seminal in Cebuano literature: Mga Awit sa Kabukiran: Mga Balitaw, Kolilisi, Mga Garay ug mga Balak nga Hinapid (Mountain Songs: Balitaw, Kolilisi, Verses, and Braided Poems), which was completed in 1911, and Mga Awit sa Kabukiran (Mountain Songs) which was completed in 1912.

He wrote over 20 books in various genres, was one of the early writers who wrote short stories, and initiated the study of Visayan folklore through Mga Awit sa Kabukiran and Mga Sugilanong Karaan (Old Stories) in 1913. He also published a newsletter called Gacetta in 1897, and the Aglipayan periodicals Yutang Natawhan (Motherland) in 1904 and Ang Salampati (The Dove) from 1920 to 1924.

== Poetry ==
Buyser, who used Cebuano and Spanish in his writings, wrote prose narratives using the pseudonyms "Alibangbang" (Butterfly), "Buddy", or the provocative "Paring Bayot" (Gay Priest). As a Cebuano poet, he was best known as Floripinas. Ang Suga, the pre-war Cebuano newspaper by Vicente Sotto, published his first poem in 1906. His collections of poems are published in five books:

- Balangaw: Mga Katapusang Tinulo sa Dagang ni Floripinas (Rainbow: Last Drops from the Pen of Floripinas)
- Balangaw: Pungpong sa mga balak ni Floripinas ug Ubang mga magbabalak nga Bisaya kinsang mga sinulat ilang gipahinungod kang Floripinas (Rainbow: Collected poems by Floripinas and Other poets who have dedicated poems to Floripinas)
- Basahon sa mga Balak (Poetry Reader)
- Kasakit ug Kalipay (Sorrow and Joy)
- Kasingkasing sa mga Balak: Pungpong sa mga Balak (Heart of the Poet: Collected Poems)

== Impact ==
He was credited for the invention of sonanoy, a Cebuano poetic form akin to the English sonnet, although alternative etymology was sonata nga mananoy (harmonious melody) due to the non-adherence to the sonnet's poetic structure. The innovation utilized in sonanoy influenced the works of next generations of Cebuano poets. According to critic Marjorie Evasco, "The themes of Buyser's poetry lay very much within the tradition of pastoral and Romantic poetry where nature and the ordinary lives of ordinary people were celebrated. Buyser also wrote about the problems of human emotion and sentiment, but his mode of approach was influenced by the techniques of illustrative metaphor and of argument employed by the poets of the late English Renaissance."

== Death ==
Buyser suffered stroke in 1944 and died in Timamana, Mainit, Surigao, at the age of 67 on November 16, 1946.
