= Baybay =

Component city in Leyte, Philippines

- Component city
- City of Baybay
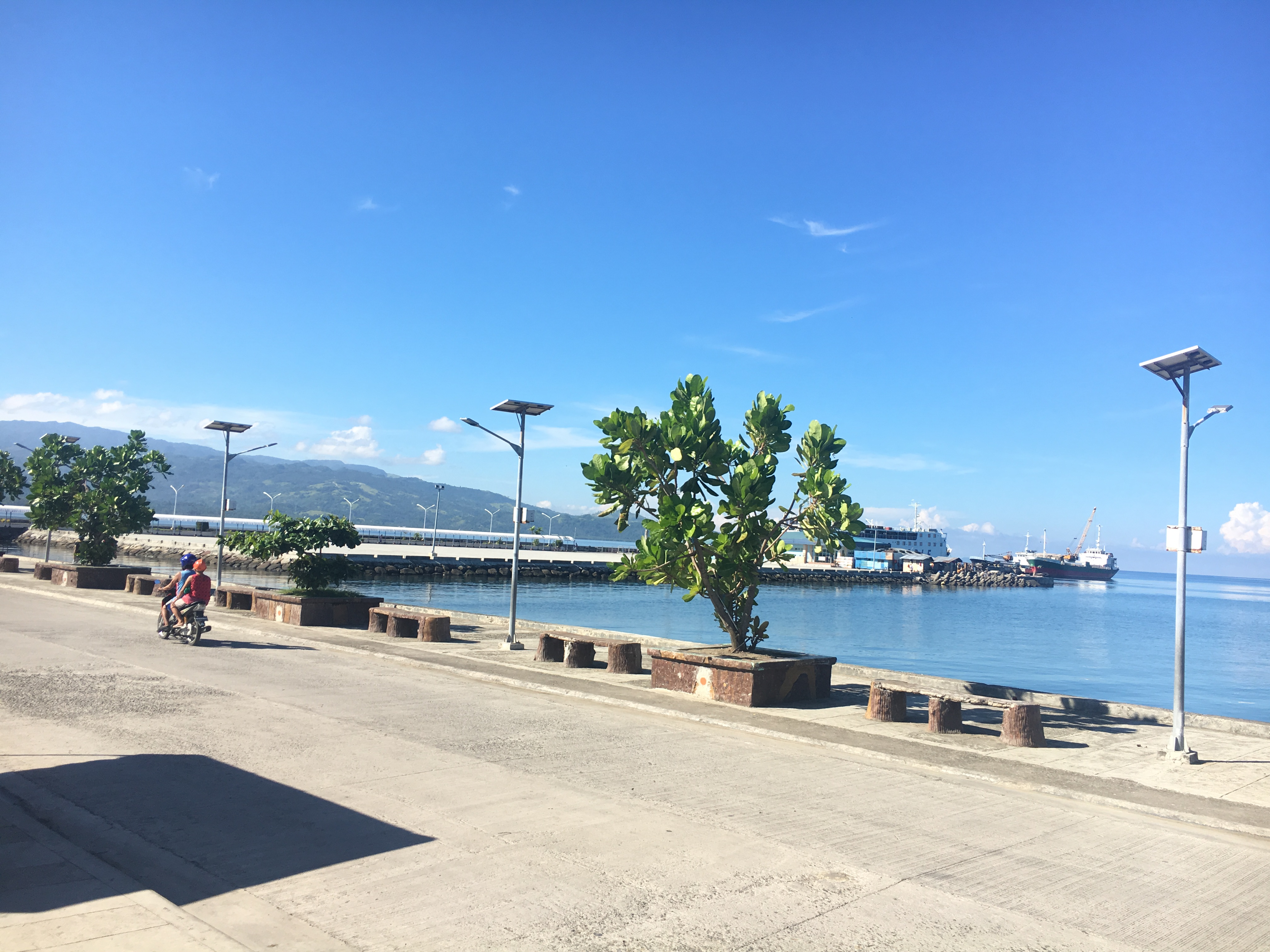
- Port area of Baybay

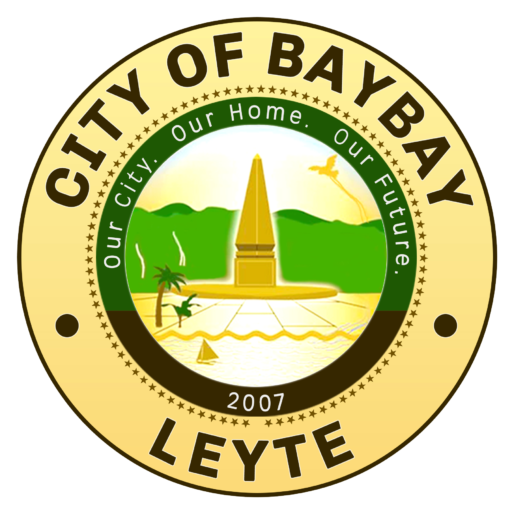
- Flag Seal
- Motto: Our City. Our Home. Our Future.
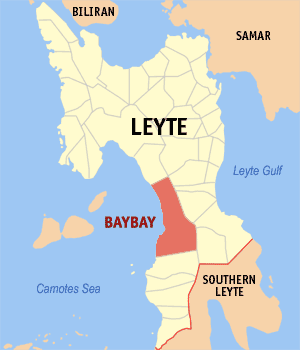
- Map of Leyte with Baybay highlighted
- Interactive map of Baybay
- Location within the Philippines
- Coordinates: 10°41′N 124°48′E
- Country: Philippines
- Region: Eastern Visayas
- Province: Leyte
- District: 5th district
- Founded: 1620
- Chartered: 1910
- Cityhood: June 16, 2007 (Lost cityhood in 2008 and 2010)
- Affirmed Cityhood: February 15, 2011
- Barangays: 92 (see Barangays)

Government
  - Type: Sangguniang Panlungsod
  - Mayor: Jose Carlos L. Cari
  - Vice Mayor: Ernesto M. Butawan
  - Representative: Carl Nicolas C. Cari
  - City Council: List: • Romulo B. Alcala; • Fulton Ike C. Arradaza; • Edgardo R. Ompoy; • Rodulfo S. Palma; • Vicente Victor G. Veloso; • Dominador K. Murillo; • Jorge V. Rebucas; • Filemon F. Avila; • Arturo Elisa O. Astorga; • Jose Rommel A. Peñaranda
  - Electorate: 69,525 voters (2025)

Area
  - Total: 459.30 km^{2} (177.34 sq mi)
- Elevation: 147 m (482 ft)
- Highest elevation: 1,313 m (4,308 ft)
- Lowest elevation: 0 m (0 ft)

Population (2024 census)
  - Total: 114,708
  - Density: 238/km^{2} (620/sq mi)
  - Households: 28,135
- Demonym: Baybayanon

Economy
  - Income class: 1st city income class
  - Poverty incidence: 23.86% (2023)
  - Revenue: ₱ 1,536 million (2024)
  - Assets: ₱ 5,908 million (2024)
  - Expenditure: ₱ 1,437 million (2024)

Service provider
  - Electricity: Leyte 4 Electric Cooperative (LEYECO 4)
- Time zone: UTC+8 (PST)
- ZIP code: 6521
- PSGC: 0803708000
- IDD : area code: +63 (0)53
- Native languages: Baybay; Cebuano; Tagalog
- Website: baybaycity.gov.ph

Baybay (IPA: [baɪ'baɪ]), officially the City of Baybay (Cebuano: Dakbayan sa Baybay; Waray: Syudad han Baybay), is a component city in the province of Leyte, Philippines. In the 2024 census, it has a population of 114,708 people.

With an area of 45,934 hectares (460 km^{2}; 180 sq mi), it is the second largest city in the province after Ormoc. Formerly, Baybay was the biggest town in Leyte in terms of population and second in terms of land area, after Abuyog. The Baybay language, a Visayan language distinct from both Waray and Cebuano, is spoken in the city itself.

Baybay houses a major port on the central west coast of Leyte, where ferries leave for and from Cebu and other islands. It has also the Baybay Public Terminal, serving routes from Tacloban, Ormoc, Maasin, Manila, Davao City, and other towns in Leyte, Southern Leyte, and Samar.

Generally an agricultural city, the common means of livelihood are farming and fishing. Some are engaged in hunting and in forestal activities. The most common crops grown are rice, corn, abaca, root crops, fruits, and vegetables. Various cottage industries can also be found in Baybay such as bamboo and rattan craft, ceramics, dress-making, fiber craft, food preservation, mat weaving, metal craft, and Philippine furniture manufacturing and other related activities.

It is the home of the Visayas State University, one of the leading schools in Southeast Asia on agricultural research, and was called as "Resort University."

== Etymology ==
The city gets its name from "baybay", meaning the flow of the river. The town was then named as Pangasugan, but when Spanish conquistadores asked a native about the name of the place, the native answered in Visayan, Ang suba nagbaybay sa Pangasugan, this is how Baybay got its current name.

== History ==
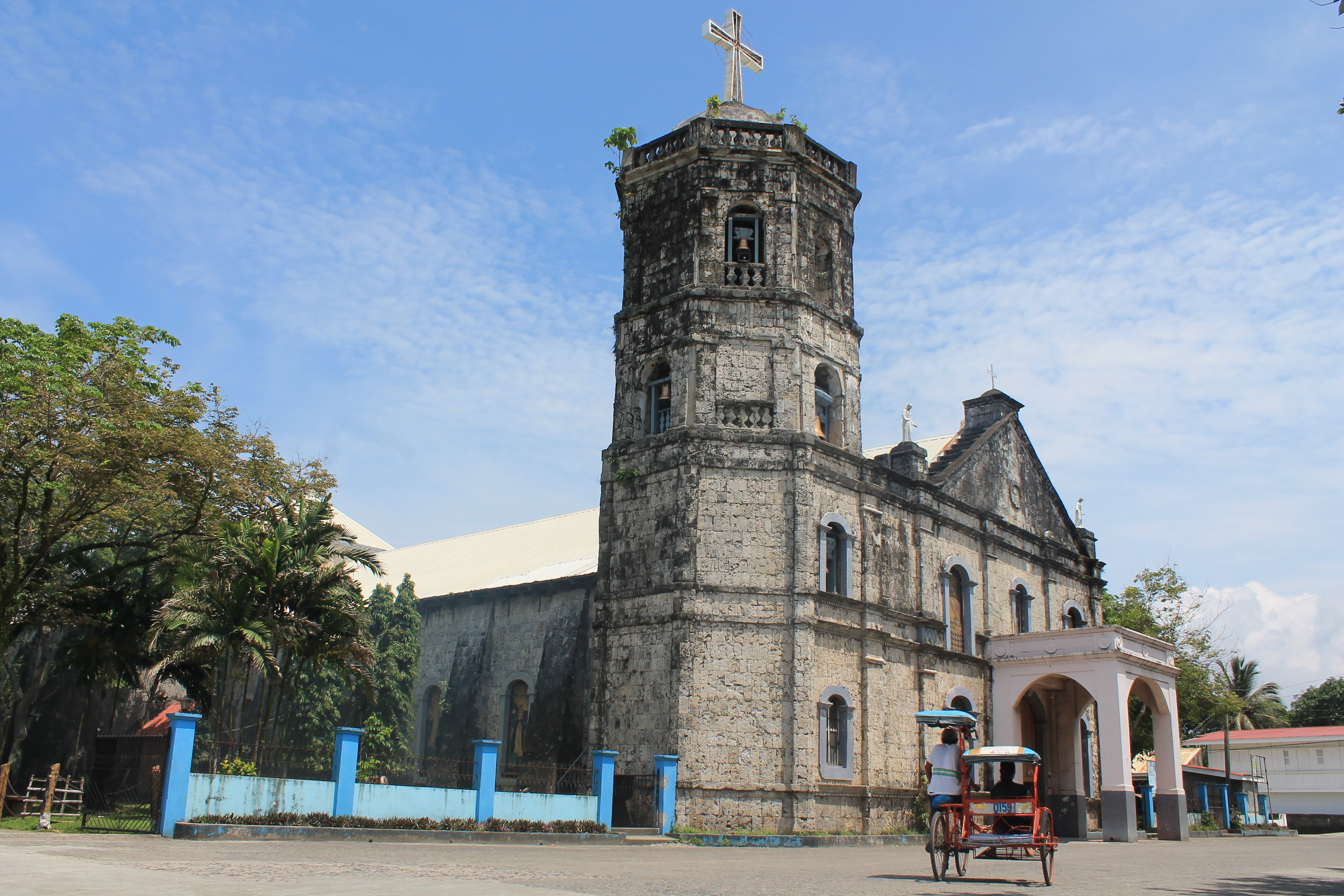
The Immaculate Conception Church in Baybay, Leyte View of Baybay Convent and Church late 1800's to early 1900's

Baybay is believed to be the only settlement on the western coast of Leyte known to the first Spanish conquistadors that came with Magellan, as was Abuyog in the eastern part of the province, and Limasawa and Cabalian in the south.

When the Spanish conquistadors extended their territory, an expeditionary force under Felipe Segundo, evidently looking for a bigger settlement, landed in Pangasugan. When he landed near the river, he pointed to a spot and asked a native in Spanish for the name of the place. Unable to understand Spanish and thinking that Felipe Segundo wanted to ask about the river, he answered in Visayan, " Ang suba nagbaybay sa Pangasugan." This is how Baybay got its name.

Shortly after Raja Tupas submitted to Miguel Lopez de Legazpi and the Spanish Crown, Sugbuhanon, including those from Matan and "Gavi," who refused to comply migrated to Baybay for a brief period of time, and raided Mandam. In response, Legazpi sent two datus to Baybay to seek peace, which failed and several more raids in Mandam were undertaken by Baybayanon in retaliation. Legazpi, in response, sought punishment for them and planned to dispatch his master-of-camp there, but accompanying Sugbuhanon petitioned to delay the venture by a few days to secure food and intended to exercise caution, as many of their kinsmen were in Baybay as well. In the meantime, the master-of-camp and Martin de Goiti were dispatched to the surrounding areas of Baybay, which Goiti previously visited, to secure peaceful alliances. After considerable success, they intended to make way for Baybay, but under Simaquio, the Sugbuhanon guide's suggestion instead landed on the small, deserted villages of Caramacua and Calabazan, and only managed to send back a few Baybayanon to Sugbo. Those who came from Sugbo were given pardons for their treason, unlike those from Matan and Gavi.

In 1620, the Jesuit fathers which belonged to the "residencia" of Carigara, the first and central station of the Society of Jesus in Leyte.

By superior approbation, Baybay was created a parish on September 8, 1835, with the invocation of Our Lady of the Immaculate Conception. However, the town was erected and independent parish on February 27, 1836.

When the Augustinians took over the administration of the parish after the expulsion of the Jesuits, they opened the first school in Baybay. During their time, the first road leading to Palompon was constructed, thus bringing Baybay closer to its neighboring municipalities. The Augustinian fathers then stayed in the town for 75 years - all of which they devoted to uplift the natives in education and in their economic standing.

The first church of Baybay was built in Barrio Punta where it still stands. Punta was one of the seven original barrios of Baybay and is even believed to be the original site of Baybay itself, although there are others who say that it was actually in Kabkab, in the vicinity of Barrio Pangasugan.

The construction of the church, which still stands today, was begun under the engineering administration of Mariano Vasnillio during the term of Fr. Vicente E. Coronado in 1852. The construction was placed on hold for ten years after which the work was resumed under Maestro Proceso, who came from Manila for the purpose of finishing the work. The church was finally finished in 1870 after Capitan Mateo Espinoso, a renowned sculptor and painter, put on the finishing touches.

Baybay suffered a great setback in 1866 when a great fire reduced much of the town to ashes leaving only the chapel of the Holy Cross in a miraculous manner.

The civil administration of the town during the Spanish era was placed in the hands of the gobernadorcillo, assisted by a teniente and the different jueces and cabezas. In 1892, in accordance with the provisions of the Mayura law, the head of the municipal government was given the designation of "Capitan Municipal" and his assistants in office were called "teniente mayor indice" and the "teniente de policia." For the first time, a juez de paz was designated and a detachment of guardias civiles was placed in the town.

As the Spanish ended their rule of the Philippines in 1898, local governmenance was taken over by the First Philippine Republic. An election was held and Don Quirimon Alkuino was elected as the first Filipino president. However, after about four months, Gen. Vicente Lukban nullified the results of the election and ordered another one to be held, with the same results. Lukban ordered that the barrios of Baybay be named after the tenientes, thus Caridad was renamed "Veloso," Plaridel became "Alvarado," Bitanhuan was named "Coronado." San Agustin "Sabando," Punta "Virgineza," Pomponan "Montefolka," Gabas "Bartolini", etc.

Throughout these years, Baybay developed into one of the biggest towns in Leyte.

The port of Baybay was closed in 1899 by the American coast guards. The price of commodities soared and products like copra and hemp accumulated in the docks. The order was lifted, but only after 14 ships, the greatest number to dock in port at one time, had stayed in port for days waiting for the order to leave.

On February 10, 1901, the first Americans arrived in Baybay on the ship "Melliza", their arrival caused great confusion and the people evacuated to the barrios. Only a few officials stayed in the town. The next day, soldiers scoured the countryside convincing the people to return to their homes.

Even while the local government was under Don Quirimon Alkuino, he was under orders to follow the commander of the American attachment, Capt. Gilmore's advice. Eventually, this caused conflicts in the local government, and Filipinos revolted against the Americans.

There were several attempts to attack the American garrison in the town, but all of them failed due to the lack of firepower against the better equipped Americans. Don Guilermo Alkuino and Don Magdaleno Fernandez led the first attack with more than 200 men. The American soldiers fought another battle in Barrio Pomponan that resulted in the death of 30 men and the destruction of the barrio.

A group of rebels from Hilongos under the renowned Francisco Flordelis made an attempt in 1901 but they were driven off in a battle at Barrio Punta.

Filipino nationalist made Baybay one of the areas where they made their last stand against the Americans. Later, the surrender ceremonies were held in the town, but only after numerous conferences between American officers and Filipino pacifists were held to effect the surrender of the resistance leaders. When Capt. Florentino Penaranda surrendered to which he was the last to do so, all his men and officers gathered at the banks of the Pagbanganan River. From there, they marched to the plaza in front of the municipal hall where the American officers were waiting. Before the Filipinos laid down their arms, Penaranda delivered a speech that even today is considered one of the most stirring addresses made in the province. To commemorate the event, a sumptuous banquet was held for the Americans and the Filipino nationalists. The following day, the Filipino soldiers trekked home in their uniforms to start another life of peace and work.

A sect of the Protestant religion entered Baybay for the first time sometime in 1900. They established their own church in the poblacion. In 1902, the Philippine Independent Church established itself in the barrio of Caridad; shortly afterwards, the Seventh Day Adventists came in. At the turn of the century, a provincial high school was founded in Baybay, one of the first high schools in Leyte. The government also established the Baybay National Agricultural School for young farmers of Visayas and Mindanao.

The Japanese forces came to Baybay in 1942, during the Second World War. Shortly after their arrival they appointed Paterno Tan Sr. was the mayor.

In 1944, American planes bombed a ship at anchor in the port of Baybay. The Japanese Imperial Forces left the town on October 19, 1944.

Baybay was used by liberation forces as a base for patrol units in the south and for forces that went north for Ormoc, where a fierce battle was raging.

=== Cityhood ===
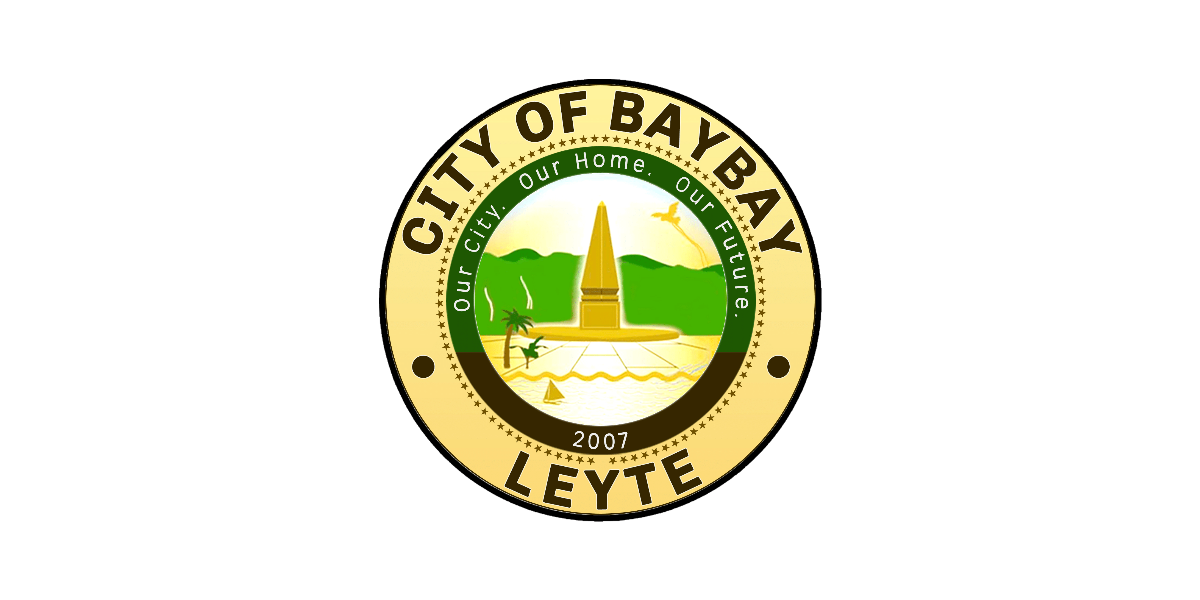
Former flag of Baybay, used until 2026

On June 16, 2007, Baybay became a city in the province of Leyte after ratification of Republic Act 9389.

The Supreme Court declared the cityhood law of Baybay and 15 other cities unconstitutional after a petition filed by the League of Cities of the Philippines in its ruling on November 18, 2008. On December 22, 2009, the cityhood law of Baybay and 15 other municipalities regain its status as cities again after the court reversed its ruling on November 18, 2008. On August 23, 2010, the court reinstated its ruling on November 18, 2008, causing Baybay and 15 cities to become regular municipalities. Finally, on February 15, 2011, Baybay becomes a city again including the 15 municipalities declaring that the conversion to cityhood met all legal requirements.

After six years of legal battle, in its board resolution, the League of Cities of the Philippines acknowledged and recognized the cityhood of Baybay and 15 other cities.

== Geography ==
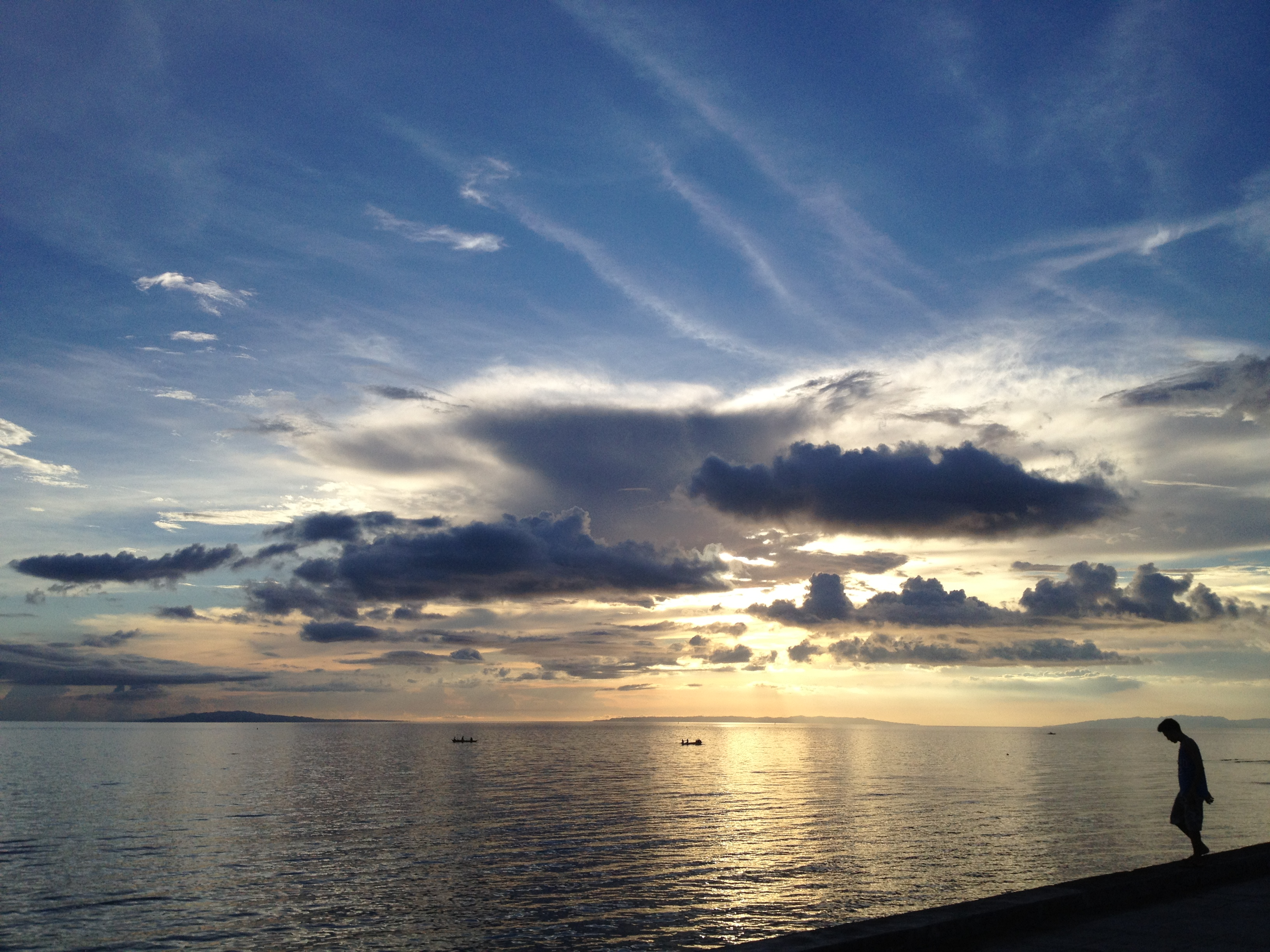
Baybay sunset in baywalk

Baybay is bounded by Camotes Sea to the west, Albuera to the north, Inopacan to the south, Burauen, La Paz and MacArthur to the northeast, Javier to the east, and Abuyog and Mahaplag to the southeast.

The climate is of Coronas Climate type IV, which is generally wet with no particularly discernible seasons. Its topography is generally mountainous in the eastern portion as it slopes down west towards the shore line. Generally an agricultural city, the common means of livelihood are farming and fishing. Some are engaged in hunting and in forestal activities. The most common crops grown are rice, corn, abaca, root crops, fruits, and vegetables. Various cottage industries can also be found in Baybay such as bamboo and rattan craft, ceramics, dress-making, fiber craft, food preservation, mat weaving, metal craft, furniture manufacture and other related activities.

=== Barangays ===
Baybay comprises 92 barangays. Each barangay consists of puroks and some have sitios.

There are 23 barangays which are in the Poblacion, with one barangay jointly located. The remaining 68 are rural barangays.

- Altavista
- Ambacan
- Amguhan
- Ampihanon
- Balao
- Banahao
- Biasong
- Bidlinan
- Bitanhuan
- Bubon
- Buenavista
- Bunga
- Butigan
- Candadam (Sitio Crossing Diversion Road)
- Can-ipa
- Caridad
- Ciabu
- Cogon
- Gaas
- Gabas
- Gacat
- Guadalupe (Utod)
- Gubang
- Hibunawan
- Higulo-an
- Hilapnitan
- Hipusngo
- Igang
- Imelda
- Jaena
- Kabalasan
- Kabatuan
- Kabungaan
- Kagumay
- Kambonggan
- Kansungka
- Kantagnos
- Kilim
- Lintaon
- Maganhan
- Mahayahay
- Mailhi
- Maitum
- Makinhas
- Mapgap
- Marcos
- Maslug
- Matam-is
- Maybog
- Maypatag
- Monterico
- Monteverde
- Palhi
- Pangasugan (Famously known as Visca)
- Pansagan
- Patag
- Plaridel
- Poblacion Zone 1 (Masagana Ric)
- Poblacion Zone 2 (Paulino Avellana)
- Poblacion Zone 3 (Lope Montefolka)
- Poblacion Zone 4 (Domingo Torres)
- Poblacion Zone 5
- Poblacion Zone 6
- Poblacion Zone 7 (Serafin Loreto)
- Poblacion Zone 8
- Poblacion Zone 9 (Eneribito Loreto)
- Poblacion Zone 10 (Juan Galenzoga)
- Poblacion Zone 11 (Don Quirimon Alkuino, Tinago)
- Poblacion Zone 12 (Felomino Mascarinas)
- Poblacion Zone 13
- Poblacion Zone 14
- Poblacion Zone 15
- Poblacion Zone 16 (Godfredo Modina)
- Poblacion Zone 17 (Zacarias Pancito)
- Poblacion Zone 18 (Gregorio Loreto Sr., Canlubag)
- Poblacion Zone 19 (Julian Lacerna)
- Poblacion Zone 20 (San Fausto)
- Poblacion Zone 21 (Alejandro Avellana, Punong)
- Poblacion Zone 22 (Juan Baquerfo, Lawis)
- Poblacion Zone 23 (Saturnino Abique, Taytayan, Albarico, Yopa)
- Pomponan
- Punta
- Saban
- Sapa
- San Agustin
- San Isidro
- San Juan
- Santa Cruz
- Santo Rosario (Cagnonoc) (Located in Poblacion)
- Villa Mag-aso
- Villa Solidaridad
- Zacarito

=== Climate ===
Climate data for Baybay, Leyte
Month	Jan	Feb	Mar	Apr	May	Jun	Jul	Aug	Sep	Oct	Nov	Dec	Year
Mean daily maximum °C (°F)	28 (82)	29 (84)	29 (84)	30 (86)	30 (86)	30 (86)	29 (84)	29 (84)	29 (84)	29 (84)	29 (84)	29 (84)	29 (84)
Mean daily minimum °C (°F)	22 (72)	22 (72)	22 (72)	23 (73)	25 (77)	25 (77)	25 (77)	25 (77)	25 (77)	24 (75)	24 (75)	23 (73)	24 (75)
Average precipitation mm (inches)	78 (3.1)	57 (2.2)	84 (3.3)	79 (3.1)	118 (4.6)	181 (7.1)	178 (7.0)	169 (6.7)	172 (6.8)	180 (7.1)	174 (6.9)	128 (5.0)	1,598 (62.9)
Average rainy days	16.7	13.8	17.3	18.5	23.2	26.5	27.1	26.0	26.4	27.5	24.6	21.0	268.6
Source: Meteoblue

== Demographics ==
Population census of Baybay
Year	Pop.	±% p.a.
1903	22,990	—
1918	36,917	+3.21%
1939	42,526	+0.68%
1948	50,725	+1.98%
1960	51,799	+0.17%
1970	63,782	+2.10%
1975	67,031	+1.00%
1980	74,640	+2.17%
1990	82,281	+0.98%
1995	86,179	+0.87%
2000	95,630	+2.26%
2007	102,526	+0.96%
2010	102,841	+0.11%
2015	109,432	+1.19%
2020	111,848	+0.46%
2024	114,708	+0.61%
Source: Philippine Statistics Authority

According to the 2020 census, Baybay had a population of 111,848 people, with a population density of approximately 243 inhabitants per square kilometer (630 inhabitants per square mile). Roman Catholicism is the predominant religion in the city, with nearly 90% of residents identifying as Roman Catholic, while other Christian denominations and minority religious groups make up the remainder of the population.

The median age of the population was 24.6 years, Based on the 2015 census, the largest age group was those aged 10 to 14 years, comprising over 11% of the total population, while residents aged 80 years and above represented the smallest age group. Baybay also recorded a youth dependency ratio of 52.45 and an old age dependency ratio of 11.05. In 2015, the city had more than 26,000 households, with an average household size of approximately 4.1 persons per household. Population growth in Baybay has remained positive over the decades with a growth rate of 0.46% from 2015 in 2020. Around 15.5% (19,489) of Baybay’s population is urban while 84.5% (106,215) is rural.

=== Language ===
People of Baybay City are mostly Boholano-speaking and Cebuano-speaking Leyteños with some influences from the Waray-Waray language. Baybayanon is the language spoken by inhabitants of the original settlements of Baybay City before mass migration of Cebuanos and Boholanos into the area and widely recognized as predating the surrounding Cebuano communities. It is a more representative language reference name than the so-called "Utodnon" or "Waya-Waya" since it does not refer to a single barangay, but spoken in five barangays, namely Guadalupe (Utod), Gabas, Kilim, Patag and Pangasugan.

It is a living language given an ISO 639-3 language code bvy and has an approximate 10,000 speakers (2009 J. Lobel). It has been listed by Ethnologue as a dialect of Waray-Waray, however, it is distinct from Waray-Waray, and is not mutually intelligible with that language. Furthermore, Baybayanon speakers do not consider themselves or their language to be Waray-Waray. No published works have argued that Baybayanon is a dialect of Waray-Waray. In fact, published works have specifically referred to this as a distinct or separate language. Other languages spoken by few in the city include English, which is used as a second languages, as well as Spanish and Hokkien Chinese, mainly spoken by the remaining people of mestizo and Chinese descent.

== Economy ==
Poverty incidence of Baybay (%)

Source: Philippine Statistics Authority

== Local government ==
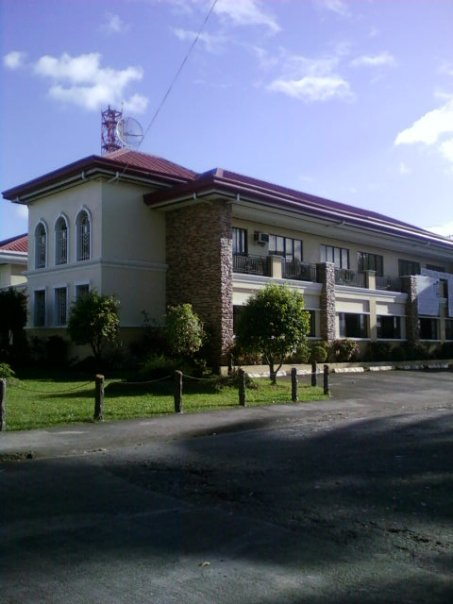
Baybay City Legislative Building and Convention Center.

Executive power is vested in the mayor. The Sangguniang Panlungsod or the city council has the legislative power to create city ordinances. It is a unicameral body composed of ten elected councilors and certain numbers of ex officio and sectoral representatives. It is presided by the vice mayor, the City Mayor and the elected city councilors are elected-at-large every three years. The Regional Trial Court Branch 14 and Municipal Trial Court in Cities are both located at the Baybay Legislative Building and Convention Center.

=== List of mayors ===
Chief Executives of Baybay
Capitan Municipal or Gobernadorcillos (Spanish Regime)
Capitan Bique		Marcelo Galenzoga	
Paulino Avellana		Julian Lacerna	
Pedro Valenzona		Gregorio Loreto	
Bartolome Bartolini		Mariano Prado	
Alejandro Avellana		Eustiquio Galenzoga	
Juan Galenzoga			
Presidentes Municipal
Quirimon V. Alkuino	1899–1903	Domingo Torres	1904–1905
Eriberto A. Loreto	1906–1907	Filemon Mascariñas	1908–1909
Teodoro Prado	1910–1911	Serafin Loreto	1912–1915
Apolinario Tavera	1916–1919	Pedro de Veyra	1920–1923
Lope Montefolka	1924–1927	Pedro de Veyra	1928–1931
Saturnino Abique	1932–1935		
Town Mayors
Serafin Loreto	1935–1939	Juan Baquerfo	1940–1941
Godofredo Modina	1942–1947	Zacarias Pancito	1948–1949
Regino Palermo	1949–1950	Paterno M. Tan	1951–1959
Nello Y. Roa	1960–1963	Eriberto V. Loreto	1964–1979
Jose V. Loreto	1980–1986	Florencio Centino	1986
Marilyn V. de Leon	1986–1987	Rodulfo Torcende	1987
Ma. Cleofe Veloso	1987	Arturo Astorga	1987
Carmen L. Cari	1988–1998	Jose Carlos L. Cari	1998–2007
City Mayors
Michael L. Cari	2007–2010	Carmen L. Cari	2010–2019
Jose Carlos L. Cari	2019–Present		

== Elected Officials ==
2025-2028 Baybay City Officials
Position	Name	Party
Mayor	Jose Carlos L. Cari	NPC
Vice Mayor	Ernesto M. Butawan	NPC
Councilors	Carmen L. Cari	NPC
Councilors	Romulo B. Alcala	NPC
Councilors	Edgardo R. Ompoy	NPC
Councilors	Fulton Ike C. Arradaza	NPC
Councilors	Simoune L. Astorga	NPC
Councilors	Dominic Junie F. Murillo	NPC
Councilors	Jose L. Bacusmo	NPC
Councilors	Ramon Ronald J. Veloso	NPC
Councilors	Jose Rommel A. Peñaranda	NPC
Councilors	Eduardo Marque R. Guinocor	NPC
Ex Officio City Council Members
ABC President	Jules Lucas C. Cari	Nonpartisan
SK Federation President	Kyla Shannen T. Vidal	Nonpartisan

== Culture ==
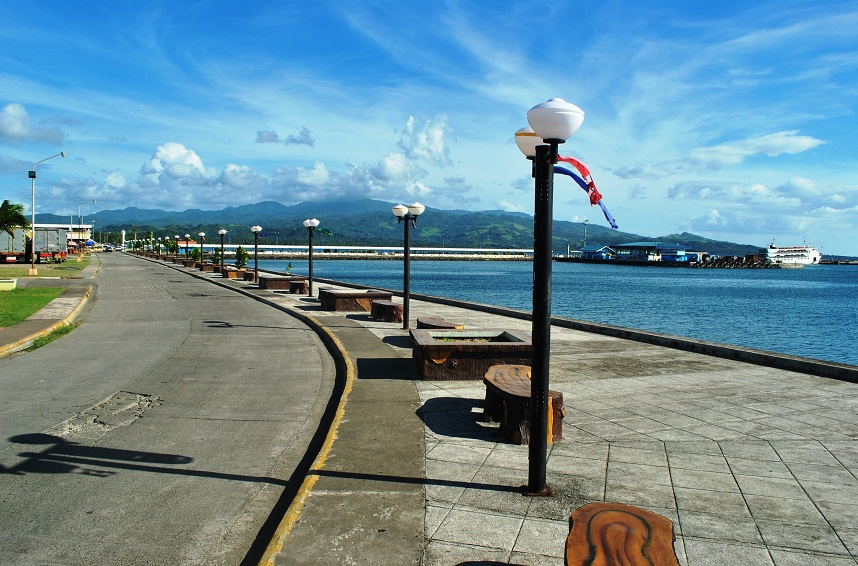
Baybay City Veteran's Park and Baywalk

Baybay is a hub of business and industry for the western coast of Leyte, with a commercial service sector in the city that includes banks, virtual assistance centers, restaurants, cafes, night spots, sports centers, as well as retail and wholesale stores. The city's seaside promenade is the most visited, especially at night-time.

=== Festivals ===
- Binaybayon Festival - is celebrated every 27th day of December in honor of the Patroness of Baybay, Our Lady of Immaculate Conception. It also depicts the rich history of Baybay and shows the main source of livelihood of most Baybayanons like fishing and farming.
- Tigbawanon Festival - is celebrated at Barangay Plaridel every 2nd Saturday of January in honor of Sr. Santo Niño. it showcases the history of Barangay Plaridel and its main source of livelihood which is farming and weaving.
- Halaran Festival - is celebrated at Barangay Santo Rosario every month of October in honor of the Holy Rosary. It showcases the history of Barangay Santo Rosario, it also showcases the main source of livelihood among residents in the place which is fishing, because the barangay resides on the coast.
- Sirong Festival - is celebrated at Barangay Pomponan every 13th day of June in honor of Saint Anthony of Padua. It showcases the history of Barangay Pomponan and its main source of livelihood which is farming.

== Infrastructure ==
=== Healthcare ===
There are five Healthcares located at the city of Baybay.

Name of the Healthcares	Type
Western Leyte Provincial Hospital (WLPH)	Public
Baybay Doctors' Hospital (BDH) Leyte	Private
Baybay Rural Health Unit I	Public
Baybay Rural Health Unit II	Public
Visayas State University Hospital

== Media ==
=== Radio stations ===
There are two radio stations operating in Baybay: Groove FM (DYBK 92.5 FM), located at P&Q Subdivision, Barangay Cogon, Baybay City, Leyte, owned by the 5th Congressman District Leyte, Jose Carlos Cari, and the Radyo Natin Baybay (DYSA 102.9 FM) located at Tres Martires Street, 6521 Baybay, Leyte, one of the radio stations owned by Radyo Natin Network.

=== Cable and satellite television ===
The Pioneer Cable Vision Incorporated or (PCVI) provides 51 channels in total. It has expanded its services in the towns of Inopacan, Hindang, Hilongos, Bato, and Matalom. Other subscribers prefer to use Cignal Digital TV, G Sat, and Sky Direct.

== Education ==
The city is home to various colleges and universities in the country.

=== Tertiary education ===
- Visayas State University (Main Campus)

a zonal agricultural university in the Visayas and one of the country's largest universities in terms of land area. VSU is also one of the premier universities in Southeast Asia in agricultural research. VSU is the only university in the entire Visayas region recognized by the Department of Tourism as a tourist site for its resorts, convention facilities, and most of all its 180‑degree view of Mount Pangasugan and the Camotes Sea. The Philippine Department of Tourism recognises its diverse flora and fauna bounding the mainland and sea from side to side.

- Franciscan College of the Immaculate Conception
- Acedilla Technological Institute Foundation Inc.

=== Secondary ===
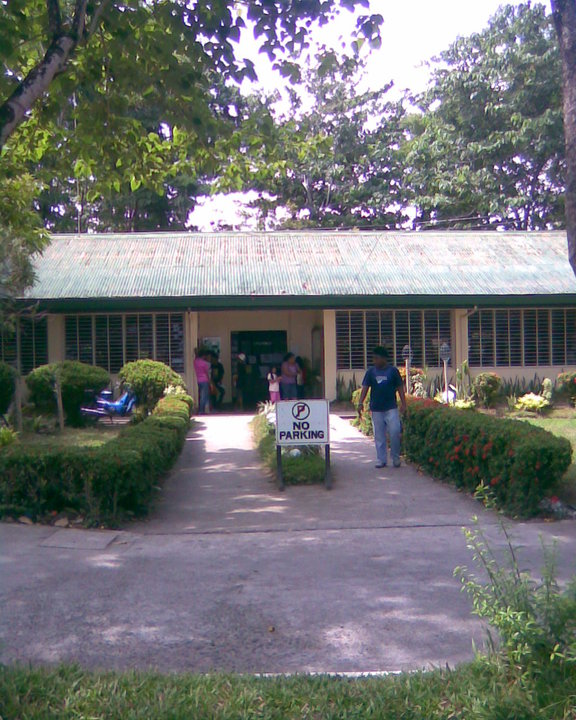
The Baybay National High School Administration Building. Baybay NHS is the biggest high school in the city (in terms of land area and population) and also the oldest high school in the city, founded in 1945.

Public

- Banahao National High School
- Baybay National High School
- Baybay City National Night High School
- Baybay City Senior National High School
- Bitanhuan National High School
- Bunga National High School
- Caridad National High School
- Ciabu National High School
- Plaridel National High School
- Pomponan National High School
- Mailhi National High School
- Makinhas National High School
- Visayas State University Laboratory High School

=== Elementary ===
There are 71 elementary schools in the city, 3 are located in the poblacion and 68 in rural areas.

=== Pre-elementary ===
There are several pre-elementary schools, i.e. kindergartens, as well as day care centers in various barangays.
