= FCIC =

FCIC or F.C.I.C. may refer to:

- Federal Crop Insurance Corporation
- Federal Citizen Information Center
- Fellow of the Chemical Institute of Canada
- Financial Crisis Inquiry Commission
- Franciscan College of the Immaculate Conception, in the Philippines
