= Merida, Leyte =

Municipality in Leyte, Philippines

Merida
- Municipality
- Municipality of Merida
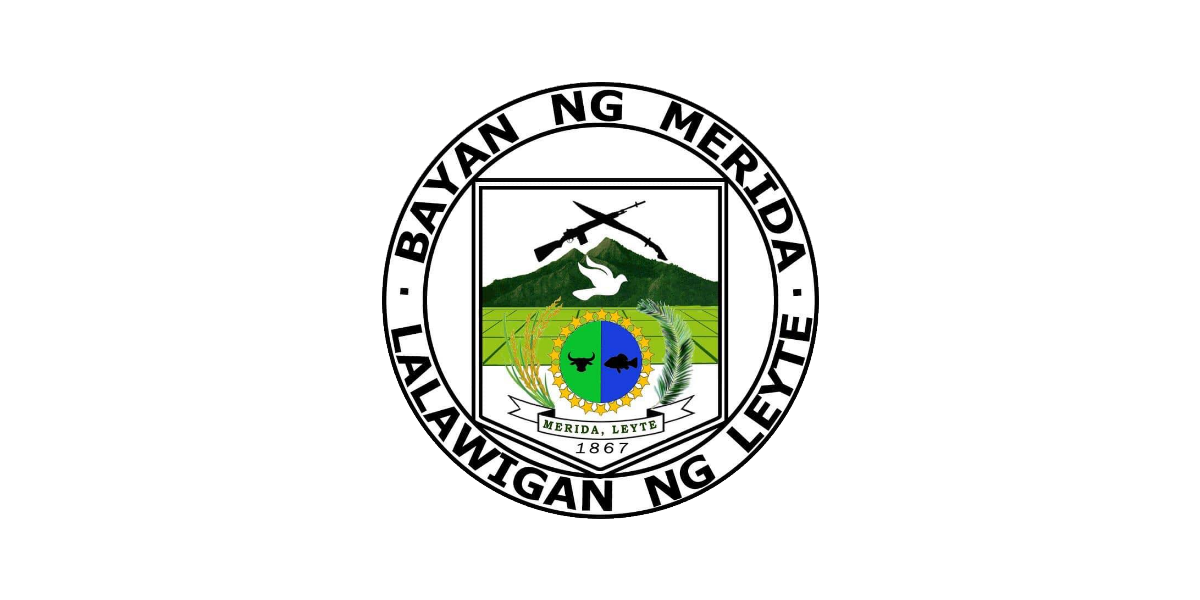
- Flag
- Nickname: Land of Merry And Dashing People
- Anthem: Merida, Garbo Ko Ikaw (English: Merida, I'm Proud Of You)
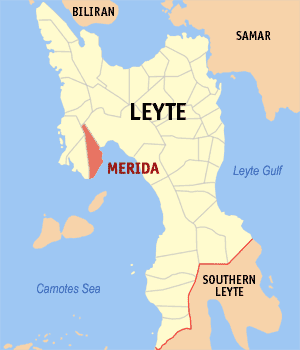
- Map of Leyte with Merida highlighted
- Interactive map of Merida
- Location within the Philippines
- Coordinates: 10°54′35″N 124°32′15″E
- Country: Philippines
- Region: Eastern Visayas
- Province: Leyte
- District: 4th district
- Named for: Mérida, Spain
- Barangays: 22 (see Barangays)

Government
  - Type: Sangguniang Bayan
  - Mayor: Rolando M. Villasencio
  - Vice Mayor: Rodrigo M. Wenceslao
  - Representative: Richard I. Gomez
  - Councilors: List: • Joel A. Marson; • Jesus Antonio R. Martinez; • Chenil C. Calderon; • Stephanie M. Miralles; • Nenfa C. Oyao; • Emarito A. Luzares; • Camilo L. Dejon; • Felipe H. Perez; DILG Masterlist of Officials
  - Electorate: 22,709 voters (2025)

Area
  - Total: 95.21 km^{2} (36.76 sq mi)
- Elevation: 94 m (308 ft)
- Highest elevation: 1,204 m (3,950 ft)
- Lowest elevation: 0 m (0 ft)

Population (2024 census)
  - Total: 32,373
  - Density: 340.0/km^{2} (880.6/sq mi)
  - Households: 8,523
- Demonym: Meridanon

Economy
  - Income class: 3rd municipal income class
  - Poverty incidence: 25.44% (2023)
  - Revenue: ₱ 190.5 million (2024)
  - Assets: ₱ 880.4 million (2024)
  - Expenditure: ₱ 185.2 million (2024)
  - Liabilities: ₱ 301.3 million (2024)

Service provider
  - Electricity: Leyte 5 Electric Cooperative (LEYECO 5)
- Time zone: UTC+8 (PST)
- ZIP code: 6540
- PSGC: 0803736000
- IDD : area code: +63 (0)53
- Native languages: Cebuano; Tagalog

Merida (IPA: [me'ridɐ]), officially the Municipality of Merida (Cebuano: Lungsod sa Merida; Waray: Bungto han Merida; Tagalog: Bayan ng Merida), is a municipality in the province of Leyte, Philippines. According to the 2024 census, it has a population of 32,373 people.

== History ==
Located east of Ormoc City, facing the Camotes Islands and Camotes Sea, Merida is nestled at the Westside of Ormoc City. Patronage to San Isidro Labrador, patron saint of farmers, peasants, labourers, rural communities, and Madrid, is sustained by the descendants of original settlers from the Spanish colonisation of the Philippines. The local economy and populace is largely reliant on agriculture and fishing.

The town was formerly situated in a place now known as Betaug. It was then called ‘Siapun after a river near the settlement. The town used to be a barrio of Ormoc. In 1860, however, the barrio was organized as a town and was promulgated in 1867 by Domingo Fernandez, the District Governor of the Province of Leyte. The first Spanish overseer nostalgically named it Merida after his native city in Spain which, like their own, lies along the bank of a river in the river Guardiana

The first leader of the town government was German Justo, succeeded by Blas Bohol, and then Leonardo Macion and Teodoro Cabiling commonly called Captain Doro. Other town notables were Rufino Santiago, Alejo Ugsad, Nicolas Gumba, Ramon Lamoste Inong, Teodoro Laurel, Cipriano Macion, Antonio Francisco, Semon Sangan and Romualdo Boholst, all who served as Governadorcillo during the Spanish time.

Merida was formally included in the parish of Ormoc, and only became independent parish in 1918. The following were the Parish Priests of Merida during the Spanish time: Fr. Ramon Abarca, Fr. Eduardo Alarcon, Fr. Lino Codilla and Fr. Diego Paras. Along the coast, Merida lies between the City of Ormoc and the progressive town of Isabel, 17 kilometers to the south. Concrete roads and bridges link Merida with adjacent towns and city direct to the capital city of Tacloban. It may be noted that Isabel, formerly named “Quiot” was made municipality by the Spaniards in 1850 which lasted 52 years and was merged into the town of Merida by virtue of Act No. 954 of the Philippine Commission. However, through the help of Ex-Senator Carlos S. Tan and Pres. Manuel A. Roxas, it was restored as a municipality by virtue of Rep. Act No. 191 of 1947, of the congress of the Philippines and Proc. No. 49, and named “Isabel” after the wife of the Senator. The newly appointed officials headed by Galicano Ruiz were inducted to office by the late Deputy Gov. Cipriano Macion of Merida.

== Geography ==
=== Barangays ===
Merida is politically subdivided into 22 barangays. Each barangay consists of puroks and some have sitios.

- Benabaye
- Cabaliwan
- Calunangan
- Calunasan
- Cambalong
- Can-unzo
- Canbantug
- Casilda
- Lamanoc
- Libas
- Libjo
- Lundag
- Macario
- Mahalit
- Mahayag
- Masumbang
- Mat-e
- Poblacion
- Puerto Bello
- San Isidro
- San Jose
- Tubod

=== Climate ===
Climate data for Merida, Leyte
Month	Jan	Feb	Mar	Apr	May	Jun	Jul	Aug	Sep	Oct	Nov	Dec	Year
Mean daily maximum °C (°F)	28 (82)	29 (84)	29 (84)	30 (86)	30 (86)	30 (86)	29 (84)	29 (84)	29 (84)	29 (84)	29 (84)	29 (84)	29 (84)
Mean daily minimum °C (°F)	22 (72)	22 (72)	22 (72)	23 (73)	25 (77)	25 (77)	25 (77)	25 (77)	25 (77)	24 (75)	24 (75)	23 (73)	24 (75)
Average precipitation mm (inches)	78 (3.1)	57 (2.2)	84 (3.3)	79 (3.1)	118 (4.6)	181 (7.1)	178 (7.0)	169 (6.7)	172 (6.8)	180 (7.1)	174 (6.9)	128 (5.0)	1,598 (62.9)
Average rainy days	16.7	13.8	17.3	18.5	23.2	26.5	27.1	26.0	26.4	27.5	24.6	21.0	268.6
Source: Meteoblue

== Demographics ==
Population census of Merida

Year	Pop.	±% p.a.
1903	8,705	—
1918	13,480	+2.96%
1939	26,794	+3.33%
1948	14,977	−6.26%
1960	16,065	+0.59%
1970	16,877	+0.49%
1975	18,027	+1.33%
1980	18,838	+0.88%

Year	Pop.	±% p.a.
1990	22,345	+1.72%
1995	23,822	+1.21%
2000	25,326	+1.32%
2007	26,285	+0.51%
2010	27,224	+1.29%
2015	29,863	+1.78%
2020	31,574	+1.18%
2024	32,373	+0.60%

Source: Philippine Statistics Authority

In the 2024 census, the population of Merida was 32,373 people, with a density of 340 inhabitants per square kilometre or 880 inhabitants per square mile.

== Economy ==
Poverty incidence of Merida (%)

Source: Philippine Statistics Authority

== Education ==
The town has five high schools including the Libas National High School and Merida Vocational School which has annexes in various barangays: MVS Calunangan, MVS Puerto Bello, MVS Minesite. The main campus is located in Greenheights District just a few meters away from the Municipal Hall. Year 2018 when these annexes of MVS became independent and therefore named as Calunangan National High School, Puertobello National High School and Minesite National High School.

=== Merida Vocational School ===
Merida Vocational School is known for its skills development program which opens a variety of vocational courses such as the following:

- Drafting Technology
- Cosmetology
- Culinary Arts
- Garments
- SMAW Welding
- Furniture and Cabinet Making
- Building Construction
- Automotive Servicing
- Building-Wiring Installation

Calunangan National High School

Calunangan National High School is known to produce graduates who are academically inclined. It offers Senior High School aligned with Academic Track and Strand in General Academics.

Facebook link: https://www.facebook.com/calunangannhs303409?mibextid=ZbWKwL

== Notable personalities ==
- John Riel Casimero – [professional boxing world champion
- Fernando Buyser – prolific Cebuano writer, poet, and bishop
