= Cuatro Islas =

Group of islands in the Philippines

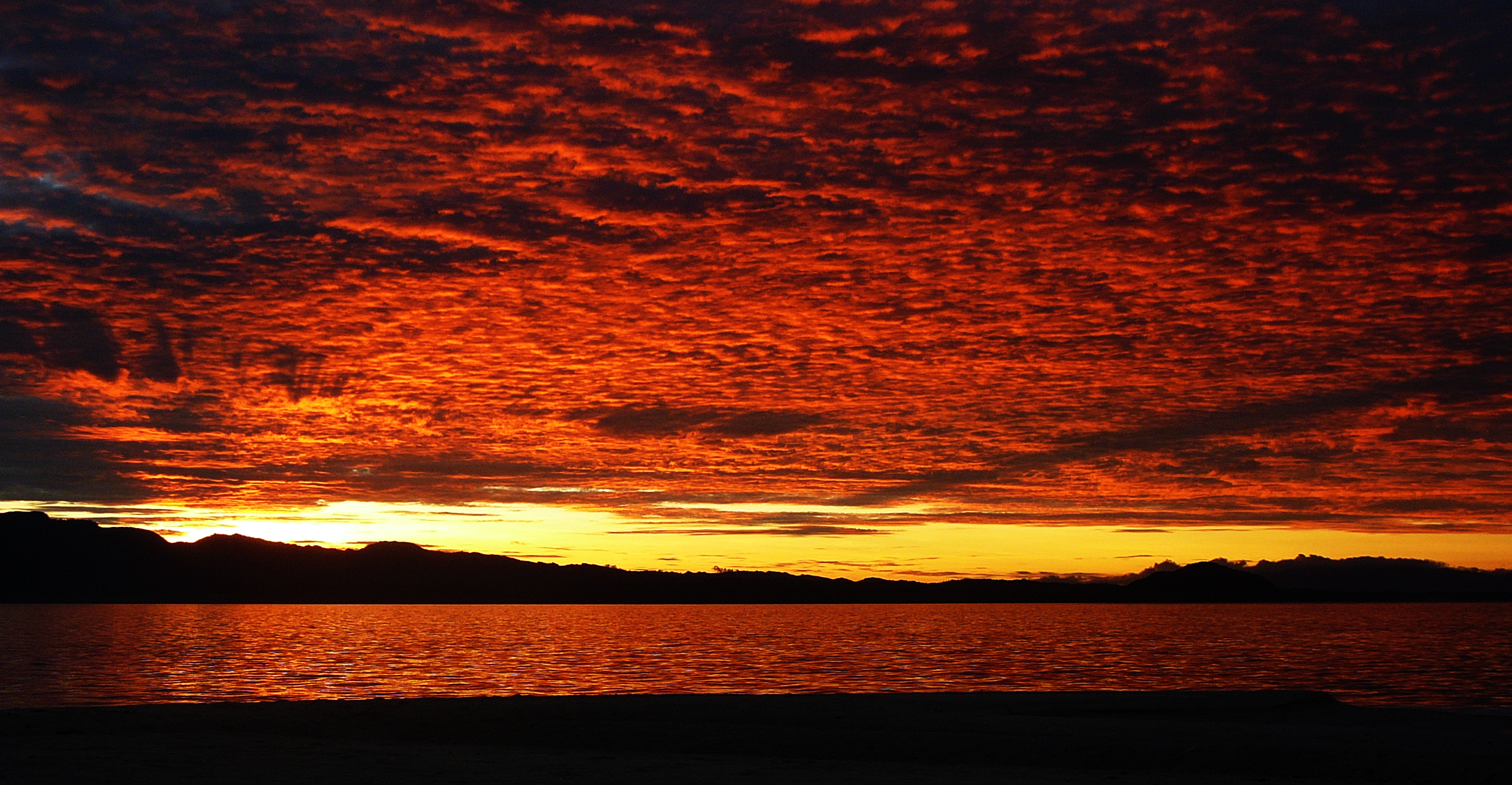
- Sunset at Cuatro Islas

- Location within Philippines

Geography
- Coordinates: 10°31′33″N 124°39′18″E
- Adjacent to: Camotes Sea
- Major islands: Apid; Digyo; Himokilan; Mahaba

Administration
- Philippines
- Region: Eastern Visayas
- Province: Leyte
- Municipalities: Hindang; Inopacan

Cuatro Islas (Spanish, meaning "Four Islands") is a group of islands belonging to the municipalities of Inopacan and Hindang, in the province of Leyte, Philippines. The group of islands consists of Apid, Digyo and Mahaba, which belong to Inopacan, while Himokilan belongs to Hindang.

== Tourism ==
The islands are drawing a good number of local and foreign tourists to their pristine beaches and coral reefs. While the islands are protected by the combination of overfishing, and poorly enforced fishing regulations, unmanaged solid waste (especially plastics) have put the islands and their associated marine ecosystems under pressure. With improved protection (especially expansion of the sanctuary areas) and infrastructure, the islands ecosystems health can recover.

The islands hold great potential to become a recreational diving destination, as the marine ecosystems' health improves and proper infrastructure is established.

== See also ==
- List of protected areas of the Philippines
