= 2016 Hilongos bombings =

Terrorist bombing in Leyte, Philippines

- Part of the Moro conflict
- Location: Hilongos, Leyte, Philippines
- Date: December 28, 2016; 21:00 (PST)
- Attack type: Bombing
- Weapon: Improvised explosive device
- Deaths: 0
- Injuries: 35

The 2016 Hilongos bombings occurred in Hilongos, Leyte, on December 28, 2016, at 9:00 p.m. (UTC +8), injuring 27 people.

== Explosion ==
The explosion occurred at the town plaza of Hilongos, near the town hall. Prior to the explosion, a boxing event during the town's festival was in progress. According to several reports, two improvised explosive devices (IEDs) exploded during the match. The first explosion happened somewhere near a tent before the announcement of the winner of the match. After few seconds, another IED was exploded. One of the explosions was reportedly near a water pump at Rizal Plaza.

According to Leyte Governor Dominic Petilla, in a Philippine Daily Inquirer report, 27 people were confirmed injured, mostly crowdgoers who watched the boxing match. Two people were in critical condition. The victims were brought to the Hilongos District Hospital and the Seventh Day Adventist Hospital to be given medical treatment.

== Perpetrators ==
No individual or group has yet claimed responsibility for the attack. President Rodrigo Duterte said on the same day of the blast, that the explosion was caused by rival drug syndicates involved in a turf war adding that Moros were also among the perpetrators. Duterte also stated that the attack could not be done by the New People's Army which had a ceasefire with the government at that time and reasoned that the communist group "has no record of throwing grenades at innocent people". The Armed Forces of the Philippines later said on December 29, that the bombing in Leyte was made by the Maute Group.

It was speculated that the bombings were a retaliation to the arrest of an alleged drug trafficker and financier of the Maute Group in a drug bust operation conducted in the same town about two months earlier, on October 22, 2016.

Philippine National Police chief Director General Ronald dela Rosa, also stated on December 29, that the bombs had "signature of the BIFF".

== See also ==
- 2016 Davao City bombing
