= Inopacan =

Municipality in Leyte, Philippines

- Municipality
- Municipality of Inopacan
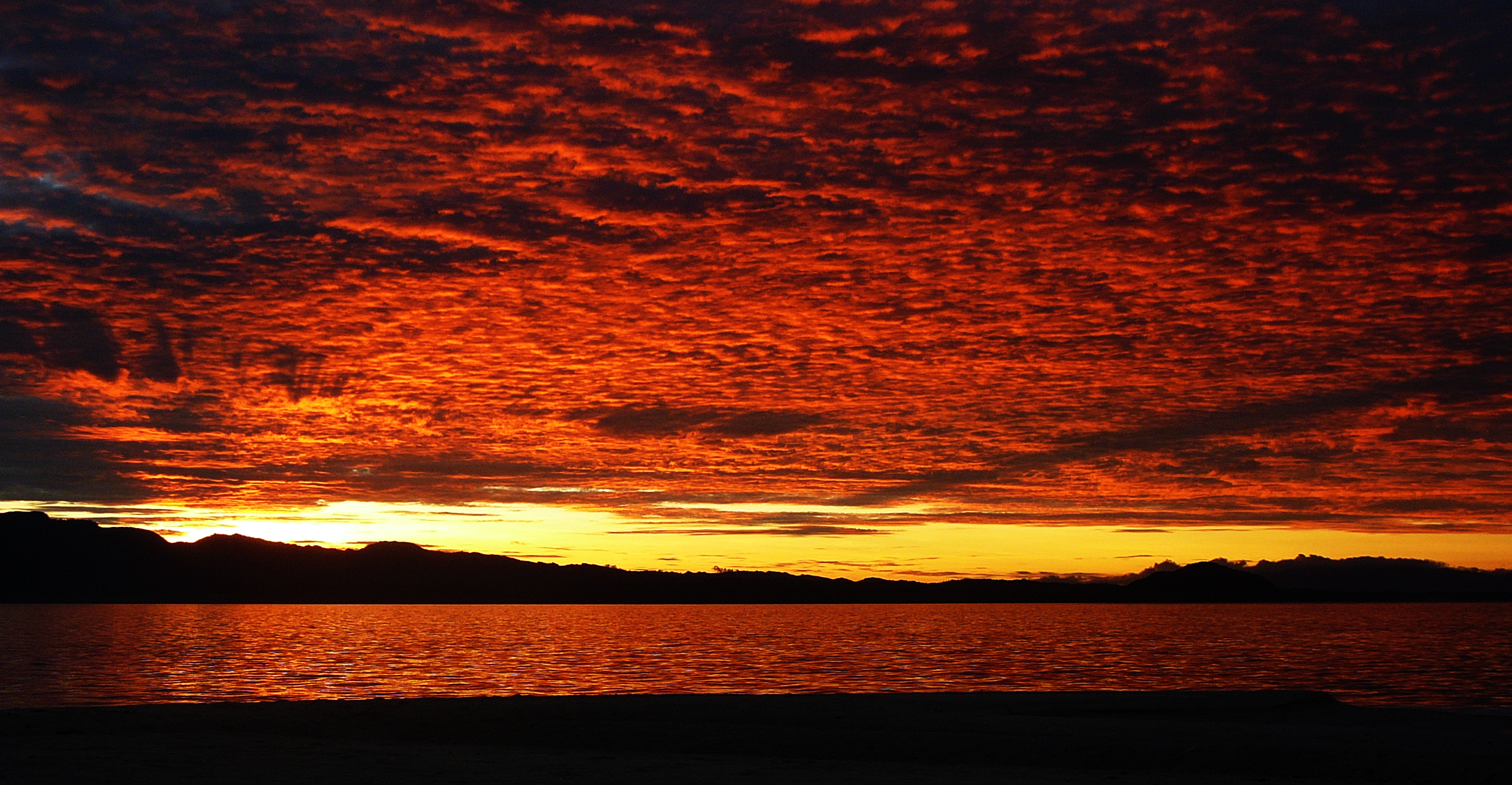
- Sunset at Cuatro Islas

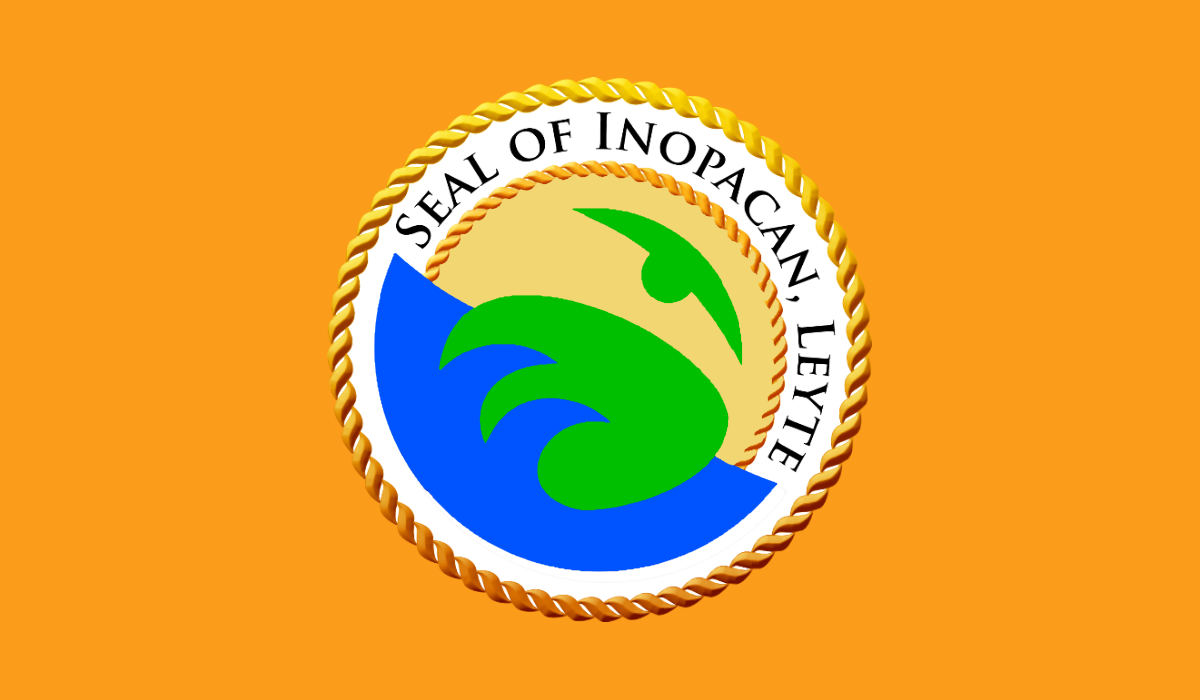
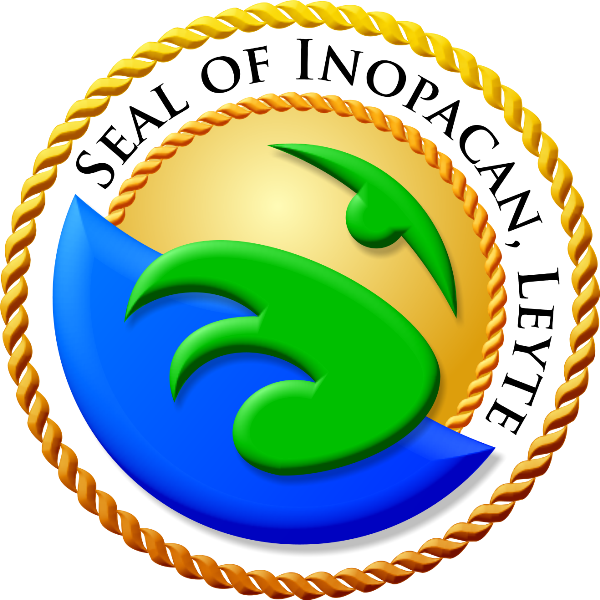
- Flag Seal
- Interactive map of Inopacan
- Location within the Philippines
- Coordinates: 10°30′N 124°45′E
- Country: Philippines
- Region: Eastern Visayas
- Province: Leyte
- District: 5th district
- Barangays: 20 (see Barangays)

Government
  - Type: Sangguniang Bayan
  - Mayor: Azucena P. Mirambel (LDP)
  - Vice Mayor: Sanders C. Lumarda (NPC)
  - Representative: Carl Nicolas C. Cari
  - Councilors: List: • Rowena K. Madrazo (LDP); • Sheila C. Lloren (LDP); • Fernando B. Rulete (NPC); • Lourdes B. Villas (LDP); • Edna L. Ceniza (LDP); • Andrew B. Dedal (NPC); • Edmund D. Bayhonan (NPC); • Teotimo G. Lapasa (NPC); DILG Masterlist of Officials
  - Electorate: 17,840 voters (2025)

Area
  - Total: 94.62 km^{2} (36.53 sq mi)
- Elevation: 7.0 m (23.0 ft)
- Highest elevation: 1,143 m (3,750 ft)
- Lowest elevation: 0 m (0 ft)

Population (2024 census)
  - Total: 21,629
  - Density: 228.6/km^{2} (592.0/sq mi)
  - Households: 5,613

Economy
  - Income class: 4th municipal income class
  - Poverty incidence: 24.75% (2023)
  - Revenue: ₱ 139.2 million (2024)
  - Assets: ₱ 425.3 million (2024)
  - Expenditure: ₱ 152.6 million (2024)
  - Liabilities: ₱ 80.05 million (2024)

Service provider
  - Electricity: Leyte 4 Electric Cooperative (LEYECO 4)
- Time zone: UTC+8 (PST)
- ZIP code: 6522
- PSGC: 0803721000
- IDD : area code: +63 (0)53
- Native languages: Cebuano; Tagalog
- Website: www.inopacan-leyte.gov.ph

Inopacan (IPA: [ɪno'pakɐn]), officially the Municipality of Inopacan (Cebuano: Lungsod sa Inopacan; Waray: Bungto han Inopacan; Tagalog: Bayan ng Inopacan), is a municipality in the province of Leyte, Philippines. According to the 2024 census, it has a population of 21,629 people.

== Etymology ==
The name of the town is a namesake of a legendary winged hero named by the natives as “Inong pak-an”, according to old folks. But history tells that Inopacan is a new name of Canamocan which was a pre-Spanish settlement according to Lee W. Vance in his book, Tracing our Ancestor and the analytical understanding of the written manuscripts of the Jesuit missionaries in Leyte. However, it remains unaccepted despite that Canamocan was mentioned as now 'Inopacan' by some authors like Atty. Francisco Tantuico of the history of Baybay, Locsin on Ormoc's History, and Eduardo Makabenta Sr. on Carigara's history.

== History ==
Much of the documents that could be a good source for learning about the history of Inopacan were destroyed when the town hall as well as the parish church and its convent were leveled into rubbles as the Japanese war planes bombed these buildings during the World War II. But based on the account of Inopacnon elders and records from neighboring towns, Inopacan was once a barangay of Hindang. with Fernando Polistico (a Boholano) as the first appointed Capitan del Barrio, and was succeeded by Francisco Espinoza, and lastly by Agustín Kudéra before Inopacan became a town on December 6, 1892.

== Geography ==
In the south, Inopacan borders with the town of Hindang and Camotes Sea in the west.

Apid and Mahaba Islands, part of the Cuatro Islas, are within the administrative jurisdiction of the municipality of Inopacan.

=== Barangays ===
Inopacan is politically subdivided into 20 barangays. Each barangay consists of puroks and some have sitios.

- Apid
- Cabulisan
- Caminto
- Can-angay
- Caulisihan
- Conalum
- De los Santos (Mahilum)
- Esperanza
- Guadalupe
- Guinsanga-an
- Hinabay
- Jubasan
- Linao
- Macagoco
- Maljo
- Marao
- Poblacion
- Tahud
- Taotaon
- Tinago

=== Climate ===
Climate data for Inopacan, Leyte
Month	Jan	Feb	Mar	Apr	May	Jun	Jul	Aug	Sep	Oct	Nov	Dec	Year
Mean daily maximum °C (°F)	28 (82)	29 (84)	29 (84)	30 (86)	30 (86)	30 (86)	29 (84)	29 (84)	29 (84)	29 (84)	29 (84)	29 (84)	29 (84)
Mean daily minimum °C (°F)	22 (72)	22 (72)	22 (72)	23 (73)	25 (77)	25 (77)	25 (77)	25 (77)	25 (77)	24 (75)	24 (75)	23 (73)	24 (75)
Average precipitation mm (inches)	78 (3.1)	57 (2.2)	84 (3.3)	79 (3.1)	118 (4.6)	181 (7.1)	178 (7.0)	169 (6.7)	172 (6.8)	180 (7.1)	174 (6.9)	128 (5.0)	1,598 (62.9)
Average rainy days	16.7	13.8	17.3	18.5	23.2	26.5	27.1	26.0	26.4	27.5	24.6	21.0	268.6
Source: Meteoblue (modeled/calculated data, not measured locally)

== Demographics ==
Population census of Inopacan

Year	Pop.	±% p.a.
1903	5,512	—
1918	8,125	+2.62%
1939	10,223	+1.10%
1948	11,005	+0.82%
1960	12,218	+0.88%
1970	14,352	+1.62%
1975	15,510	+1.57%
1980	15,878	+0.47%

Year	Pop.	±% p.a.
1990	16,894	+0.62%
1995	18,864	+2.09%
2000	18,680	−0.21%
2007	19,276	+0.43%
2010	19,904	+1.17%
2015	20,550	+0.61%
2020	21,389	+0.85%
2024	21,629	+0.27%

Source: Philippine Statistics Authority

In the 2024 census, the population of Inopacan was 21,629 people, with a density of 230 inhabitants per square kilometre or 600 inhabitants per square mile.

== Economy ==
Poverty incidence of Inopacan (%)

Source: Philippine Statistics Authority

== Elected Officials ==
2025-2028 Inopacan, Leyte Officials
Position	Name	Party
Mayor	Azucena P. Mirambel	LDP
Vice Mayor	Sanders C. Lumarda	NPC
Councilors	Rowena K. Madrazo	LDP
Councilors	Sheila C. Lloren	LDP
Councilors	Fernando B. Rulete	NPC
Councilors	Lourdes B. Villas	LDP
Councilors	Edna L. Ceniza	LDP
Councilors	Andrew B. Dedal	NPC
Councilors	Edmund D. Bayhonan	LDP
Councilors	Teotimo G. Lapasa	LDP
Ex Officio Municipal Council Members
ABC President	Panfila I. Alonzo	Nonpartisan
SK Federation President	Nathaniel Dave M. Katigbe	Nonpartisan
