= Franciscan College of the Immaculate Conception =

Roman Catholic college in Leyte, Philippines

- Former name: Immaculate Conception College (ICC)
- Type: Private, Catholic basic and higher education institution
- Established: July 22, 1947; 79 years ago
- Religious affiliation: Roman Catholic (Sisters of St. Francis of Perpetual Adoration)
- Academic affiliations: PAASCU
- President: Sister M. Andrea Tomanda, OSF, DM
- Location: Baybay, Leyte, Philippines; 10°40′38″N 124°48′21″E
- Campus: Urban
- Colors: Blue and White
- Website: fcic.edu.ph
- Location in the Visayas Location in the Philippines

The Franciscan College of the Immaculate Conception (FCIC) is a private, Catholic basic and higher education institution run by the Sisters of St. Francis of Perpetual Adoration in Baybay, Leyte, Philippines. It is dedicated to the Immaculate Conception of Mary, who is believed ro have been born without the stain ("macula" in Latin) of Original Sin.

The school offers basic (K-12) education and undergraduate courses. It is accredited by the Philippine Accrediting Association of Schools, Colleges and Universities.)

== History ==
=== Beginning ===
In May 1947, the late Bishop Miguel Mascariñas, D.D., Bishop of Palo, the Parish Priest of Baybay, Fr. Flaviano Daffon and a group of Baybayanons - Dr. Jose Silao, Sr., Mr. Amado Masecampo, Atty. Jovencio Borneo, Ex-Mayor Apolinario Tavera and several others convened at the Parish Convent decided to establish a Catholic School to be administered by a religious order. While waiting for the availability of a religious group, the school was run by lay people and classes were conducted in a rented house of Segundo Borneo at A. Bonifacio St. Thus, the Immaculate Conception College (ICC) was born on July 22, 1947, with the following Board of Trustees and Incorporators who are now all deceased:

- Chairman - Hon. Bernardo Torres
- Vice-chairman - Dr. Jose Silao, Sr.
- Treasurer - Fr. Flaviano Daffon
- Secretary - Mr. Amado Masecampo
- Auditor - Ex-Mayor Apolinario Tavera
- Member - Fr. Alfredo Rosales
- Member - Engr. Florencio Coloma
- Incorporator - Mr. Efigenio Mascariñas
- Incorporator - Atty, Glicerio Eballar

=== Administration ===
MBernardo Torres served as the First School Director until 1945 when he retired following his election as governor of Leyte. The school leadership was then passed on to Father Esteban Justimbante, the Parish Priest of Baybay. In 1956, the Franciscan fathers of the province of St. John the Baptist, Cincinnati, Ohio, U.S.A., arrived in the Philippines through the invitation of Bishop Lino Gonzaga, D.D., the bishop of Palo. The Franciscan Fathers assumed the administration of the school with Fr. Brice Mulroy, OFM, serving as director from 1956 to 1961 and from 1963 to 1970; Father Vianney Brinkman, OFm, was the director from 1961 to 1963. Fr. Elwin Harrongton, OFM, 1962–1963 and Fr. Brian Irving, OFM, 1968–1969, were acting directors. Other Franciscan friars have rendered years of service in FCIC. They are the following: bro, Richard Kloster (Bursar), Fr. Madian Schneider (Chaplain), Bro. Cletus Reider (Maintenance Supervisor) and Fr. Patrick MacAuley (Religious Supervisor and Chaplain).

The following have also served FCIC as lay administrators:

- Lilia Modina - High School Principal (1956–1963), Dean of Commerce & Secretarial Dept. (1964–1969), Registrar (1963–1987)
- Alicia Tan - Dean of college (1963–1964), Dean of Liberal Arts (1964–1969)
- Eugenio Alvarado, Jr. - Registrar (1950–1954), Dean of Education (1964–1967)
- Lourdes Salas - Dean of college (1969–1974)
- Evelyn Baldevia - Elementary Principal (1969–1970).

To reinforce the school teaching staff, the Sisters of St. Francis of Perpetual Adoration, Mishawaka, Indiana, U.S., were invited to the Philippines to help in the Education Industry. The four pioneering sisters who came on October 11, 1962, were: Sister Denise Stolinski, OSF (High School Principal), Sister Mary Paul Pfautsch, OSF (Guidance Counselor), Sister M. Annette Crone, OSF (Medical and Dental Clinic Supervisor) and Sister M. Mark Orgon, OSF (Grade School Principal). Two other American sisters joined the staff in the later years, namely; Sister M. Joseph Ann Vogel, OSF, who arrived in 1969 and has been a Guidance Counselor, College Teacher & Piano Teacher and Sister M. Dianne Zimmer, OSF, who served as College Dean from 1974 to 1976.

With the vision of providing good education and the commitment to serve Baybay in the education apostolate, the Sisters of St. Francis of Perpetual Adoration purchased FCIC from the Franciscan fathers in 1970, but the turn-over was the following year. Thus, January 1, 1971, marked a new era in the educational life of the Franciscan College of the Immaculate Conception (FCIC) as well as in the history of the OSF sisters, whose convent and formation house are located some meters from the school. The directorship of the school was assumed by Sister Mary Paul Pfautsch, OSF.

As the Filipinization of schools in the Philippines became an urgent national issue in 1976, the leadership of the school was transferred to qualified Filipino Administrators. The school directorship was held by the following sisters:

- Sister M. Grace Gerong, OSF - 1976 - 1984
- Sister M. Catherine Dean, OSF - 1984 - 1989
- Sister M. Rose Otic, OSF - 1989 - 1991
- Sister M. Teresita Lopez, OSF - 1991 - 1995
- Sister M. Veronica Tulipas, OSF - 1995 - 2004

In school year 2004 - 2005, the organizational set-up of the school was changed such that a President heads the school. In the same school year, Sister M. Adrianne Siano, OSF, was installed as the first School President of FCIC. On April 13, 2009, Sister M. Teresita Lopez, OSF assumed the position as president. In the school year 2013 - 2014, the organizational set up was returned to directorship and Sister M. Teresita Lopez, OSF was retained as head of the school. Starting the Academic Year 2014 - 2015, Sister M. Grace Gerong, OSF held the said position.

=== Facilities ===
The typhoon "Amy" destroyed the original building of ICC. When the Franciscan Fathers assumed ownership, a new site was purchased along Andrés Bonifacio Street. New buildings were constructed on the seven-hectare school area: a three-story main building, the shop and the canteen. Cardinal Rufino J. Santos blessed them on February 22, 1961. Simultaneously, the school was renamed Franciscan College of the Immaculate Conception.

The college gymnasium was completed in the year 1967. The music building graced the campus in 1972 and the Chaplain's residence in 1977. The Grade School building was completed on September 30, 1981. Additional buildings have been added to extend better and new services to the school populace - the Bonzel Health and Nutrition Center together with the Non-Formal Education Building in 1994 and the Learning Resource Center in 1995. The latest structure was blessed by Archbishop Gian Vincenzo Moreni, Apostolic Nuncio of the Philippines, during his pastoral visit on July 27, 1995. The construction of a separate school Chapel and the Covered walks from the comfort rooms to the main gate were completed in 1996 and 1998 respectively. The most recent was the completion of the Alumni Center in 2016.

== College ==
At college level, the following courses are offered;

=== College of Midwifery ===
- BS in Midwifery (CHED)

=== College of Teacher Education ===
- Bachelor of Elementary Education (BEEd)
- Bachelor of Secondary Education (BSEd) with majors in: English Language, Filipino Language, Guidance, Mathematics, Biology and Values Education

=== College of Business Management and Administration ===
- Bachelor of Science in Business Administration (BSBA) with majors in: Financial Management, Management and Human Resource Development
- Bachelor of Science in Hospitality Management
- Bachelor of Science in Office Administration

=== College of Information Technology ===
- Bachelor of Science in Information Technology
- Associate in Computer Technology (2 Years)

=== College of Criminal Justice ===
- Bachelor of Science in Criminology

== Other programs ==
The Graduate School offers a Master of Arts degree in education, with majors in education technology, English language, Filipino language and natural science.

There is also a NFE/NTE program service, offering school-based courses in sewing, tailoring, food preparation, pastoral/catechetical and home arts. It also offers community-based courses in functional literacy, Com. Livelihood, mat making (by Extension Program), cosmetology and hair science, and mobile clinic (Handog Puso).

== See also ==
- List of colleges and universities in the Philippines
