= Hindang =

Municipality in Leyte, Philippines

- Municipality
- Municipality of Hindang
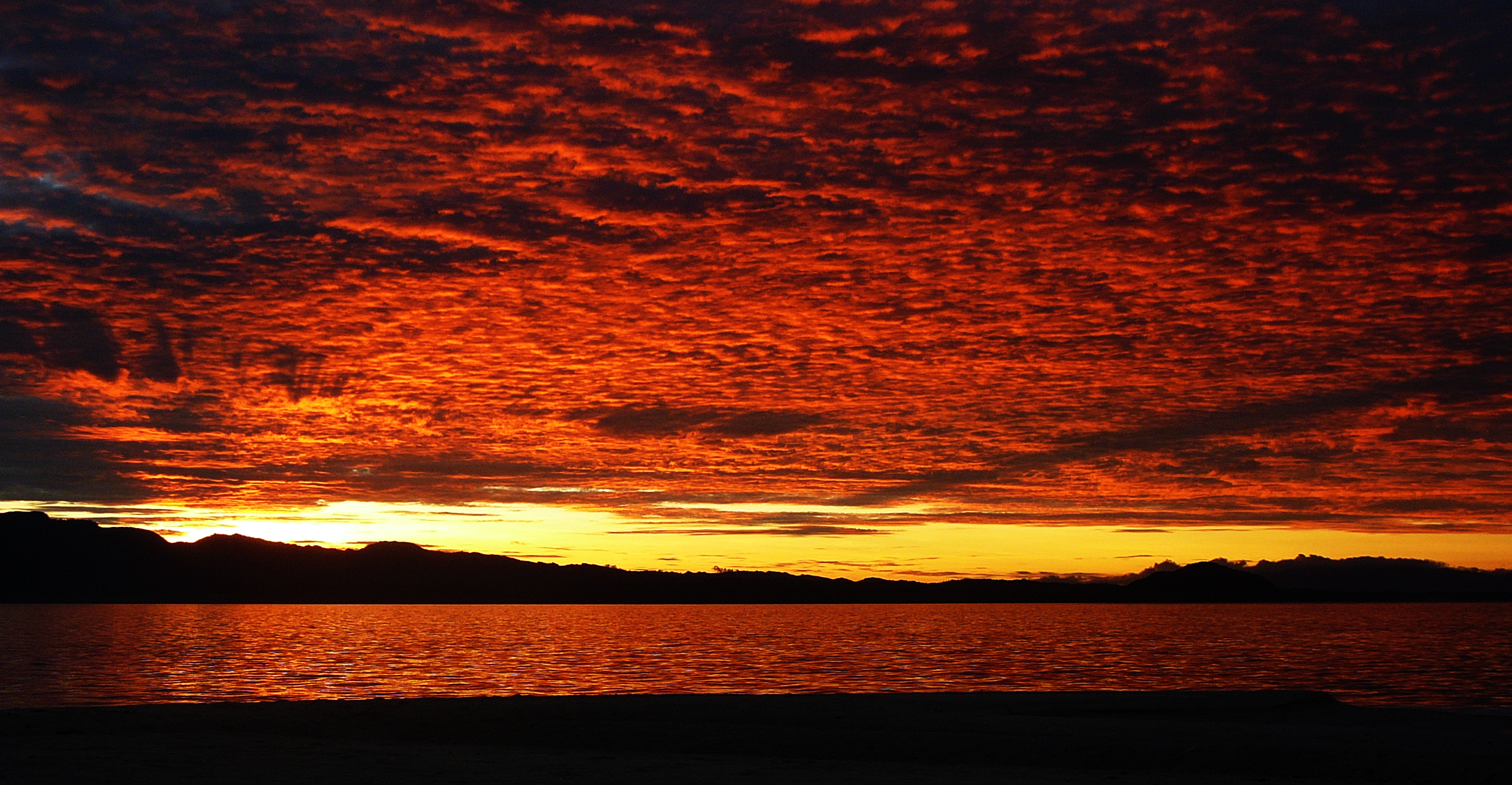
- Sunset at Cuatro Islas

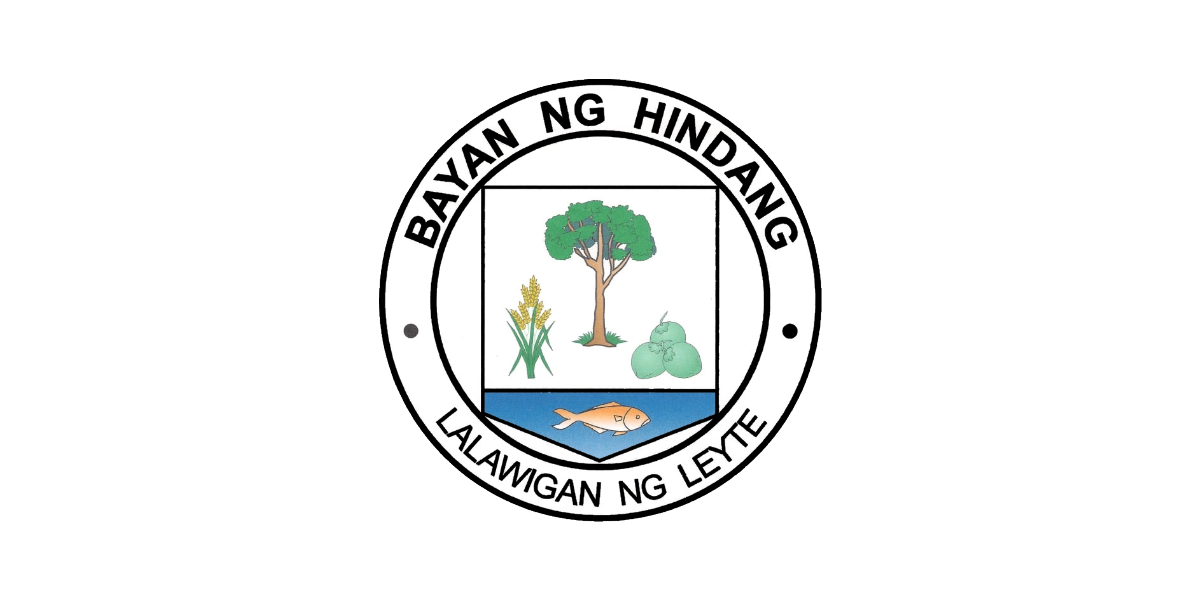
- Flag

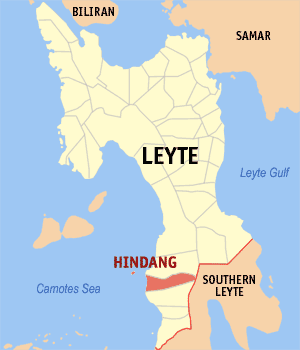
- Map of Leyte with Hindang highlighted
- Interactive map of Hindang
- Location within the Philippines
- Coordinates: 10°26′02″N 124°43′40″E
- Country: Philippines
- Region: Eastern Visayas
- Province: Leyte
- District: 5th district
- Barangays: 20 (see Barangays)

Government
  - Type: Sangguniang Bayan
  - Mayor: Elpidio B. Cabal Jr.
  - Vice Mayor: Jun A. Cabal
  - Representative: Carl Nicolas C. Cari
  - Councilors: List: • Clotilde P. Abenoja; • Teodulo A. Clavejo; • Salvador E. Bañez Jr.; • Leonida A. Cavite; • Jose Napoleon D. Montero; • Soriano B. Delalamon; • Mikhael Anne Gelo D. Aboyme; • Sean Ryan Mark C. Cabal; DILG Masterlist of Officials
  - Electorate: 14,590 voters (2025)

Area
  - Total: 50.04 km^{2} (19.32 sq mi)
- Elevation: 4.7 m (15 ft)
- Highest elevation: 202 m (663 ft)
- Lowest elevation: 0 m (0 ft)

Population (2024 census)
  - Total: 21,520
  - Density: 430.1/km^{2} (1,114/sq mi)
  - Households: 5,290

Economy
  - Income class: 4th municipal income class
  - Poverty incidence: 26.77% (2023)
  - Revenue: ₱ 124.6 million (2024)
  - Assets: ₱ 417.7 million (2024)
  - Expenditure: ₱ 105.7 million (2024)
  - Liabilities: ₱ 59.3 million (2024)

Service provider
  - Electricity: Leyte 4 Electric Cooperative (LEYECO 4)
- Time zone: UTC+8 (PST)
- ZIP code: 6523
- PSGC: 0803720000
- IDD : area code: +63 (0)53
- Native languages: Cebuano; Tagalog

Hindang (IPA: [hɪn'daŋ]), officially the Municipality of Hindang (Cebuano: Lungsod sa Hindang; Waray: Bungto han Hindang; Tagalog: Bayan ng Hindang), is a municipality in the province of Leyte, Philippines. According to the 2024 census, it has a population of 21,520 people.

In the north, it borders the town of Inopacan and Hilongos in the south. Himokilan is a part of Cuatro Islas (The Four Islands), in which the other three (3) remaining islands are under the administrative jurisdiction of the municipality of Hindang.

== Geography ==
=== Barangays ===
Hindang is politically subdivided into 20 barangays. Each barangay consists of puroks and some have sitios.

In 1957, the sitios of Canhaayon, Capudlosan, Himokilan, Anolon, Mahilum, Baldoza, and Tagbibi were converted into barrios.

- Anahaw
- Anolon
- Baldoza
- Bontoc
- Bulacan
- Canha-ayon
- Capudlosan
- Himacugo
- Doos Del Norte
- Doos Del Sur
- Himokilan Island
- Katipunan
- Maasin
- Mabagon
- Mahilum
- Poblacion 1
- Poblacion 2
- San Vicente
- Tabok
- Tagbibi

=== Climate ===
Climate data for Hindang, Leyte
Month	Jan	Feb	Mar	Apr	May	Jun	Jul	Aug	Sep	Oct	Nov	Dec	Year
Mean daily maximum °C (°F)	28 (82)	29 (84)	29 (84)	30 (86)	30 (86)	30 (86)	29 (84)	29 (84)	29 (84)	29 (84)	29 (84)	29 (84)	29 (84)
Mean daily minimum °C (°F)	22 (72)	22 (72)	22 (72)	23 (73)	25 (77)	25 (77)	25 (77)	25 (77)	25 (77)	24 (75)	24 (75)	23 (73)	24 (75)
Average precipitation mm (inches)	78 (3.1)	57 (2.2)	84 (3.3)	79 (3.1)	118 (4.6)	181 (7.1)	178 (7.0)	169 (6.7)	172 (6.8)	180 (7.1)	174 (6.9)	128 (5.0)	1,598 (62.9)
Average rainy days	16.7	13.8	17.3	18.5	23.2	26.5	27.1	26.0	26.4	27.5	24.6	21.0	268.6
Source: Meteoblue

- Bagyong Bading

== Demographics ==
Population census of Hindang

Year	Pop.	±% p.a.
1903	6,662	—
1918	8,834	+1.90%
1939	8,795	−0.02%
1948	10,003	+1.44%
1960	10,490	+0.40%
1970	12,445	+1.72%
1975	14,088	+2.52%
1980	16,163	+2.79%

Year	Pop.	±% p.a.
1990	16,272	+0.07%
1995	16,567	+0.34%
2000	18,493	+2.39%
2007	19,927	+1.04%
2010	20,179	+0.46%
2015	20,924	+0.69%
2020	20,849	−0.08%
2024	21,520	+0.76%

Source: Philippine Statistics Authority

In the 2024 census, the population of Hindang was 21,520 people, with a density of 430 inhabitants per square kilometre or 1,100 inhabitants per square mile.

== Economy ==
Poverty incidence of Hindang (%)

Source: Philippine Statistics Authority

== Local Government ==
2025-2028 Hindang, Leyte Officials
Position	Name	Party
Mayor	Elpidio B. Cabal Jr.	NPC
Vice Mayor	Jun A. Cabal	NPC
Councilors	Clotilde P. Abenoja	Independent
Councilors	Teodulo A. Clavejo	NPC
Councilors	Salvador E. Bañez Jr.	Independent
Councilors	Leonida A. Cavite	NPC
Councilors	Jose Napoleon D. Montero	NPC
Councilors	Soriano B. Delalamon	NPC
Councilors	Mikhael Anne Gelo D. Aboyme	NPC
Councilors	Sean Ryan Mark C. Cabal	NPC
Ex Officio Municipal Council Members
ABC President	TBD	Nonpartisan
SK Federation President	TBD	Nonpartisan

== History ==
The official name of the municipality has always been Hindang since the town's establishment in 1860. Legend has it that the name was derived from a very large tree named "Indang" which used to stand in the northern part of the town. It was told that the tree was "enchanted" because there were stones of fairies or beautiful damsels with long flowing hair basking under it on moonlit nights. There was also a ghostly tale about a man who committed suicide by hanging himself from one of its branches. When his body was discovered, the place became haunted by a voice in agony, a long silence then mournful weeping followed by a remorseful sigh.

The founders of the town were Rev. Fr. Bales, the parish priest at that time, Mission Alejandro, a prominent citizen, and the capitanes Damos Bañez, Irong Ballener, and Beo Abddies.

Like other coastal towns, Hindang suffered very much from Moro depredations. However, despite the heavy lootings, the town managed to recover each time and was able to rebuild what the pirates carried off or destroyed.

The townsfolk of Hindang are essentially musical-minded and even during the Spanish times, they used to hold frequent band concerts. Dramas portraying the rivalry between the Moros and the Christians for supremacy were often depicted. "Pastores" and "Tombolas" were held especially during the Christmas season. Horse races were held during Sundays and these were sources of entertainment for the Spanish residents who were not averse to making bets on their favorites.

More public schools were established during the American regime. The government offices that used to be held by Americans were slowly being opened to deserving Filipinos. At the outbreak of the First World War, many Hindang residents volunteered for service. They were sent to Manila for training before finally being shipped to the fronts.

In 1911, a long drought and one of the most destructive typhoons to hit the province caused near famine to the impoverished population. Some of the leaders during this period who helped put Hindang back on the road to recovery were Don Miguel Abamo, Don Leon Fernandez, Marciano Rodriguez, and Estanislao Picson. Capitan Nemesio Delalamon was the last of the presidentes during this period.

Numerous townsfolk of Hindang suffered physical torture during the Japanese occupation from 1942 to 1944. Two guerrilla factions were fighting for supremacy. Only the timely mediation of Colonel Kangleon prevented the guerrilla groups from destroying each other. Unified by the Colonel, the group helped destroy the hold of the Japanese on the town. The long sufferings from the Japanese occupation finally came to an end when the Americans came to liberate the country in October 1944.

On July 4, 1946, the granting of independence to the Philippines led to the initiation of government projects like irrigation systems, schoolhouses, and a public market.

== Education ==
- Saint Michael College of Hindang Leyte (1948)
