= Hilongos =

Municipality in Leyte, Philippines

- Municipality
- Municipality of Hilongos
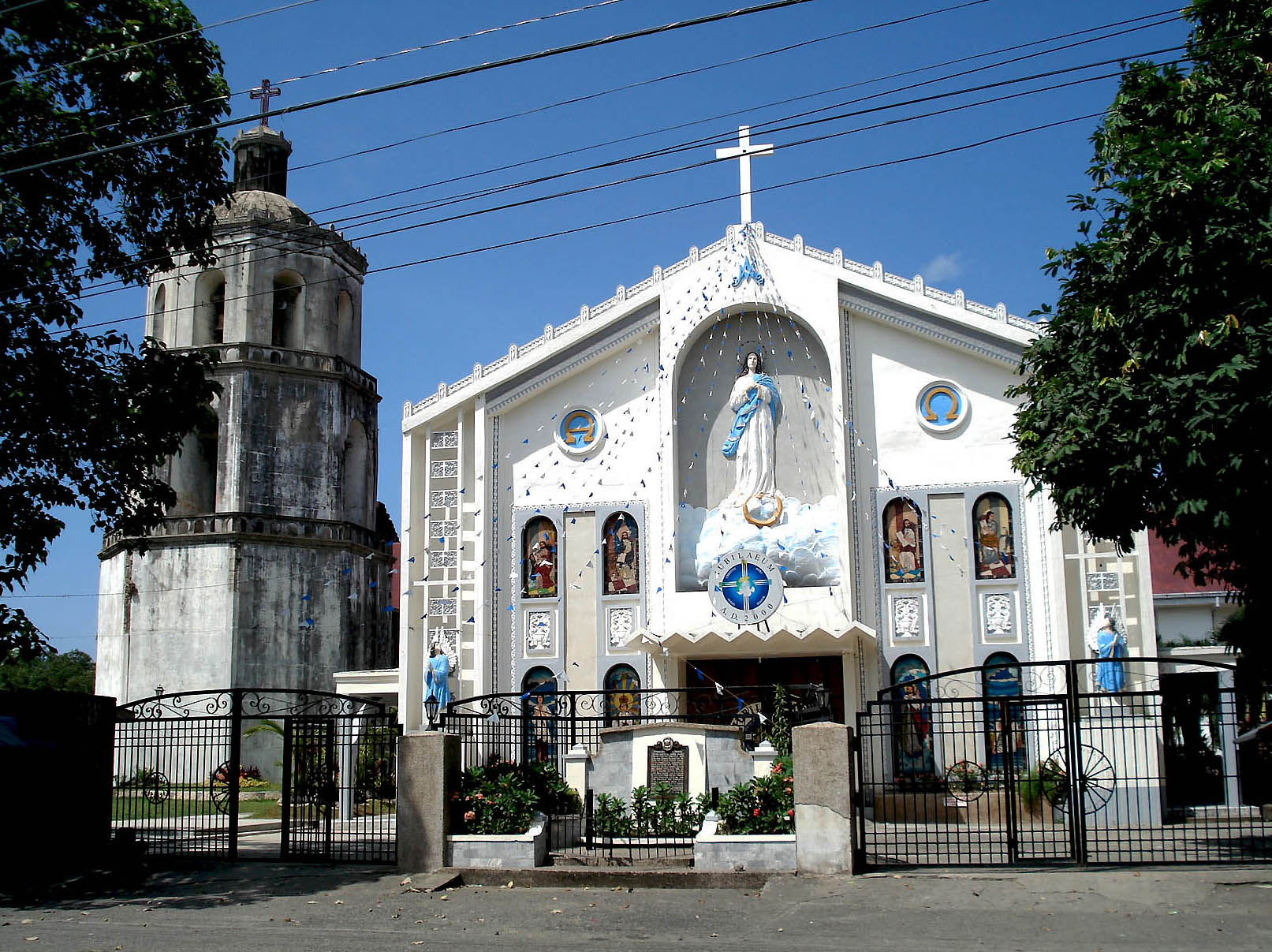
- Immaculate Conception Parish Church

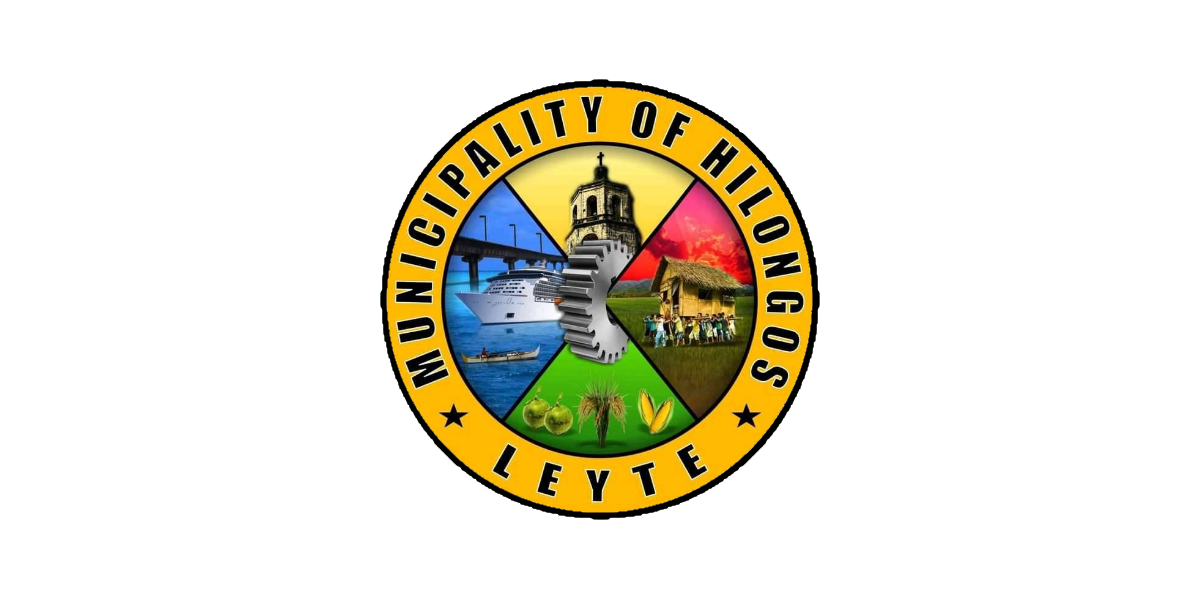
- Flag Seal
- Interactive map of Hilongos
- Location within the Philippines
- Coordinates: 10°22′N 124°45′E
- Country: Philippines
- Region: Eastern Visayas
- Province: Leyte
- District: 5th district
- Founded: 1590 (Pueblo de los Hilongos)
- Barangays: 51 (see Barangays)

Government
  - Type: Sangguniang Bayan
  - Mayor: Manuel R. Villahermosa
  - Vice Mayor: Albert R. Villahermosa
  - Representative: Carl Nicolas C. Cari
  - Councilors: List: • Manuel R. Villahermosa; • Josenilo M. Reoma; • Cristuto F. Ong; • Carmelito M. Zarate; • Joseph F. Fulache; • Bernadeth M. Nerves; • Francisco M. Ortega; • Edwin F. Faller; DILG Masterlist of Officials
  - Electorate: 44,655 voters (2025)

Area
  - Total: 192.92 km^{2} (74.49 sq mi)
- Elevation: 88 m (289 ft)
- Highest elevation: 1,133 m (3,717 ft)
- Lowest elevation: 0 m (0 ft)

Population (2024 census)
  - Total: 66,774
  - Density: 346.12/km^{2} (896.45/sq mi)
  - Households: 15,918

Economy
  - Income class: 1st municipal income class
  - Poverty incidence: 28.49% (2023)
  - Revenue: ₱ 310 million (2024)
  - Assets: ₱ 1,192 million (2024)
  - Expenditure: ₱ 338.3 million (2024)
  - Liabilities: ₱ 106.6 million (2024)

Service provider
  - Electricity: Leyte 4 Electric Cooperative (LEYECO 4)
- Time zone: UTC+8 (PST)
- ZIP code: 6524
- PSGC: 0803719000
- IDD : area code: +63 (0)53
- Native languages: Cebuano; Tagalog

Hilongos (IPA: [hɪ'lɔŋos]), officially the Municipality of Hilongos (Cebuano: Lungsod sa Hilongos; Waray: Bungto han Hilongos; Tagalog: Bayan ng Hilongos), is a First Income Class municipality in the province of Leyte, Philippines. According to the 2024 census, it has a population of 66,774 people.

Hilongos is situated in the southwestern part of Leyte. Hilongos is also a center for government, religion, shipping, rice production, commerce, banking, finance, telecommunications, health services, education, sports and socio-cultural activities.

The Port of Hilongos is one of the biggest and busiest in Eastern Visayas (Region 8), known for being the main port where travelers go in and out of Leyte due to its strategic location on the island. Hilongos Port caters day and night trips to and from the city and is the primary choice for travelers especially from the southern parts of Leyte. Hilongos also has an airport, but is mostly restricted to general aviation use. Hilongos has two public markets and two teo transport terminals. The municipality is composed of 51 barangays with vast coastal plains used in the production of rice.

== History ==
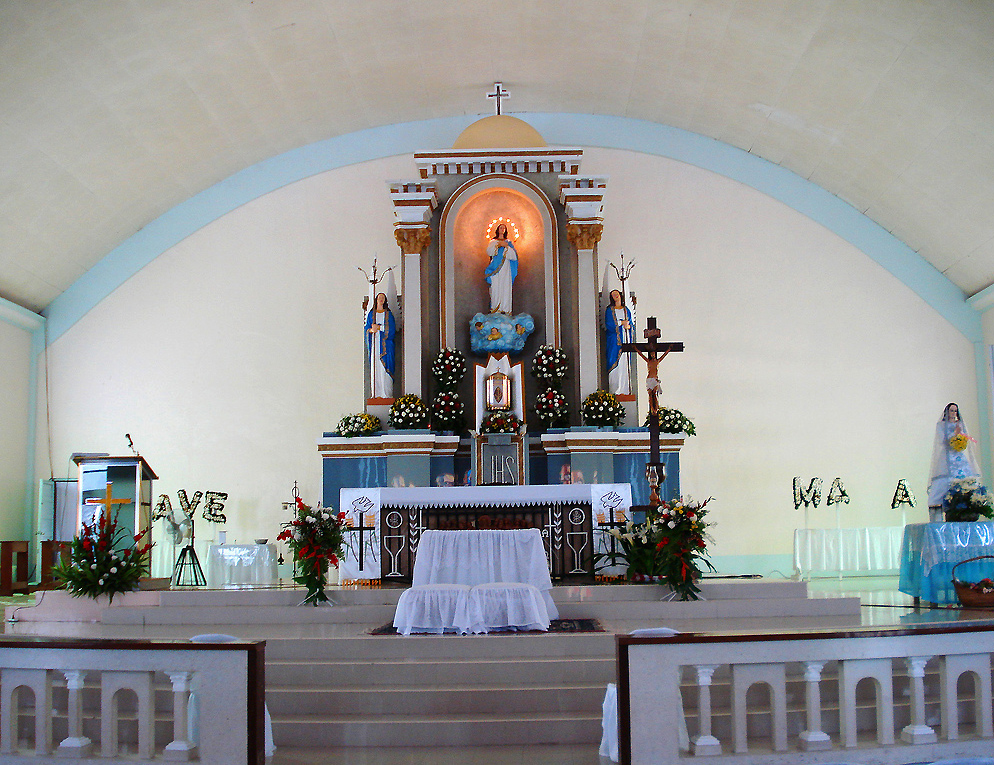
Church Sanctuary

Legend has it that in the 12th century, Amahawin, an Ilonggo from Iloilo, conquered neighboring barangays on Leyte's western shore and extended his territory to the present-day areas of Inopacan, Hindang, Bato, and Matalom. He formed a settlement and named it Hilongos, because its inhabitants were Ilonggos.

In 1710, the Jesuits established a residence there. It is not known when Hilongos became a parish, some sources say it happened approximately from before 1737 to 1754.

In 1768, the Jesuits ceded Hilongos to the Augustinians. In 1774–79, the Augustinians established schools in Hilongos. In 1784, Palompon, a Hilongos visita, became an independent parish.

In 1862, Manicar led a revolt against the Spanish at barrio Santa Margarita.

In 1873, Leovio Magia led a revolt. Unlike the towns of eastern Leyte, which were ceded to the Franciscans in 1843, the towns along Leyte's western coast gradually fell to the seculars.

In late 1992, an unrecognized municipal government established by the New People's Army in Barangay San Antonio, Hilongos collapsed upon being taken over by the Philippine National Police (PNP).

On December 28, 2016, a bomb attack occurred during the town festivities. The explosion occurred in Barangay Central Poblacion were a boxing match was being held. At least 34 people residents were injured and brought to the Hilongos District Hospital and other nearby hospitals. Officials said an IED was used in the attack. No suspects were identified, but officials accused the BIFF and Maute Group of orchestrating the attacks.

== Geography ==
Hilongos shares borders with the municipalities of Hindang to the north, Mahaplag to the northeast, Sogod (Southern Leyte) and Bontoc (Southern Leyte) to the east, Bato to the south and to the west lies the Camotes Sea.

=== Barangays ===
Hilongos is politically subdivided into 51 barangays. Each barangay consists of puroks and some have sitios.

- Agutayan
- Atabay
- Baas
- Bagong Lipunan (BLISS)
- Bagumbayan
- Baliw
- Bantigue
- Bon-ot
- Bung-aw
- Cacao
- Campina
- Cantandog 1
- Cantandog 2
- Concepcion (Makinhas)
- Hampangan
- Himo-aw
- Hitudpan
- Imelda Marcos (Pong-on)
- Kang-iras
- Kanghaas
- Lamak
- Libertad
- Liberty
- Lunang
- Magnangoy
- Manaul
- Marangog
- Matapay
- Naval
- Owak
- Pa-a
- Central Poblacion
- Eastern Poblacion
- Western Poblacion
- Pontod
- Proteccion
- San Agustin
- San Antonio
- San Isidro
- San Juan
- San Roque (Taganas)
- Santa Cruz
- Santa Margarita
- Santo Niño
- Tabunok
- Tagnate
- Talisay
- Kanghaas
- Tambis
- Tejero
- Tuguipa
- Utanan

=== Climate ===
Climate data for Hilongos, Leyte
Month	Jan	Feb	Mar	Apr	May	Jun	Jul	Aug	Sep	Oct	Nov	Dec	Year
Mean daily maximum °C (°F)	28 (82)	29 (84)	29 (84)	30 (86)	30 (86)	30 (86)	29 (84)	29 (84)	29 (84)	29 (84)	29 (84)	29 (84)	29 (84)
Mean daily minimum °C (°F)	22 (72)	22 (72)	22 (72)	23 (73)	25 (77)	25 (77)	25 (77)	25 (77)	25 (77)	24 (75)	24 (75)	23 (73)	24 (75)
Average precipitation mm (inches)	78 (3.1)	57 (2.2)	84 (3.3)	79 (3.1)	118 (4.6)	181 (7.1)	178 (7.0)	169 (6.7)	172 (6.8)	180 (7.1)	174 (6.9)	128 (5.0)	1,598 (62.9)
Average rainy days	16.7	13.8	17.3	18.5	23.2	26.5	27.1	26.0	26.4	27.5	24.6	21.0	268.6
Source: Meteoblue

== Economy ==
Poverty incidence of Hilongos (%)

Source: Philippine Statistics Authority

== Demographics ==
Population census of Hilongos

Year	Pop.	±% p.a.
1903	12,478	—
1918	19,758	+3.11%
1939	25,920	+1.30%
1948	27,310	+0.58%
1960	27,472	+0.05%
1970	34,625	+2.34%
1975	38,530	+2.17%
1980	43,744	+2.57%

Year	Pop.	±% p.a.
1990	48,617	+1.06%
1995	50,744	+0.81%
2000	51,462	+0.30%
2007	53,911	+0.64%
2010	56,803	+1.92%
2015	63,431	+2.12%
2020	64,514	+0.36%
2024	66,774	+0.83%

Source: Philippine Statistics Authority

In the 2024 census, the population of Hilongos was 66,774 people, with a density of 350 inhabitants per square kilometre or 910 inhabitants per square mile.

== Culture ==
=== Heritage sites ===
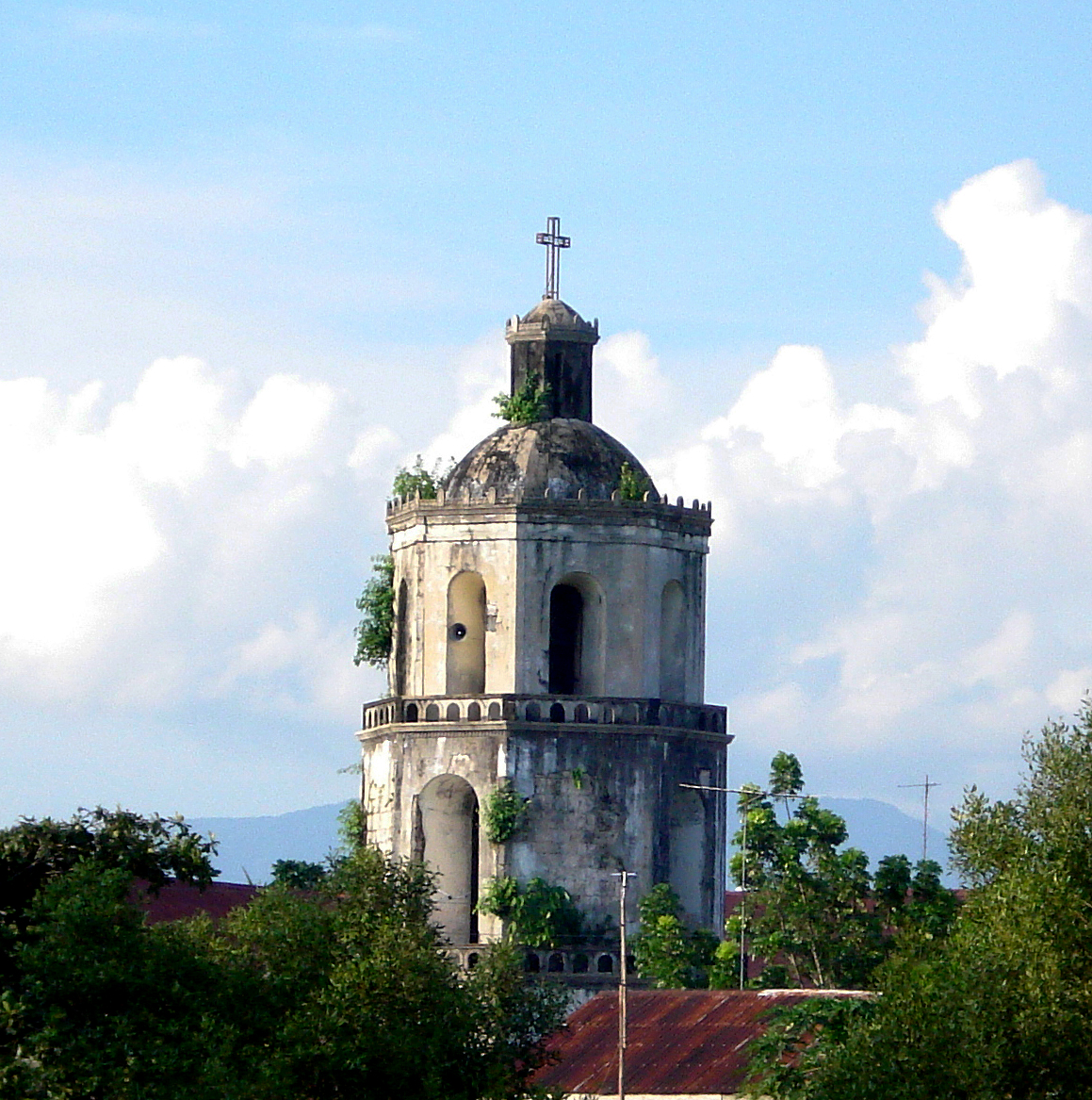
Church Bell Tower

Church complex—The present church's bell tower is attributed to Don Leonardo Celis-Díaz, a native of Cebu. The building of the church fabric itself is disputed.

The church complex underwent major renovations over the centuries. The original church, now incorporated as a transept, was a single-nave structure whose main door was also the gate to a bastioned fortification. Some bastions and walls of that fortification still remain. The main nave of the church is a modern construction, and the bell tower commissioned by Fr. Celis-Diaz is an independent multi story structure.

The church interior is completely new compared to the interior which may have been completed in the 19th century. The interior guards many of the church's antiques including silver vessels from the 18th century.

== Transportation ==
=== Shipping ===
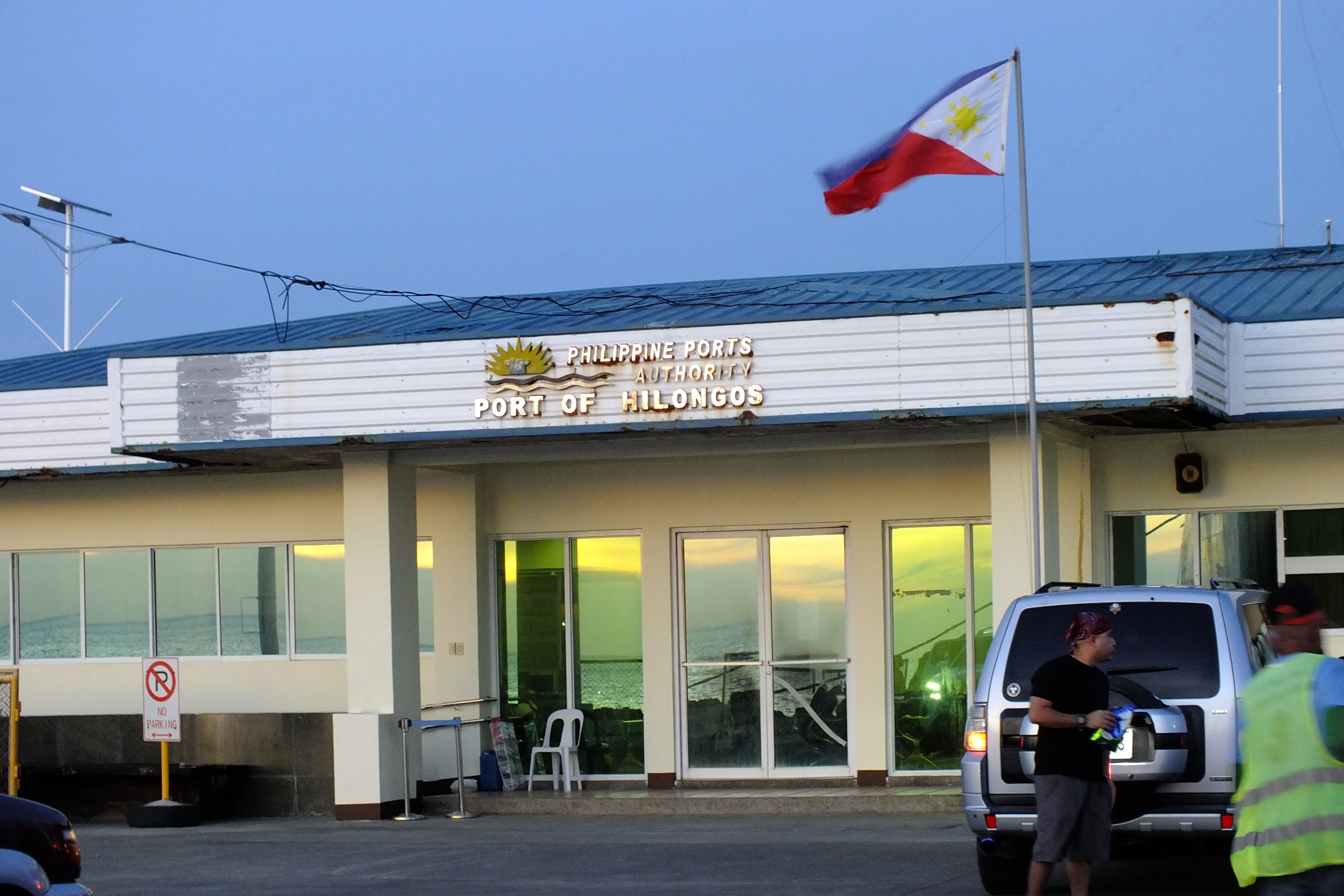
Port of Hilongos

- Roble Shipping Inc.: Ro-Ro/Passenger/Cargo service, day & night trips to Cebu City and vice versa
- Gabisan Shipping Lines Inc.: Ro-Ro/Passenger/Cargo service, day & night trips to Cebu City and vice versa
- Peñafrancia/Santa Clara Shipping Corporation: Ro-Ro/Passenger/Cargo service, daily trips to Ubay, Bohol and vice versa
- Seacat (Grand Ferries): Fastcraft to Cebu City and vice versa
- Leopards Motorboat Service: daily trips to Ubay, Bohol and vice versa
- Also, a number of cargo vessels are making calls at the port of Hilongos for cement, copra and other cargoes/products

=== Land ===
- Main Type of Transportation: Bus/Mini-Bus/Van/Jeep/Multicab
- Routes: Hilongos-Colon/Talamban (vice versa), Hilongos-Tacloban (vice versa), Hilongos-Ormoc/Baybay (vice versa), Hilongos-Maasin (vice versa), Hilongos-Sogod (vice versa), Hilongos-Davao (vice versa)
- Other Types of Land Transport Facilities: Electronic Tricycles (RACAL), Sidecars (Tricycles), "Trisikad/Padyak" (locally known as "Pot-pot") and also "Habal-habal" (specialized motorcycles that are used as the mode of transport for the mountainous parts of Interior Hilongos).

=== Air ===
Hilongos Airport
Type of Airport	Emergency
Location	Hilongos, Leyte
Total Area	17 hectares (42 acres)
Distance from Town Center	1 kilometre (3,280 ft)
Airport Apron	2,400 m^{2} (25,830 sq ft) MAC (Macadam)
Airport Runway	1,000 m × 30 m (3,280 ft × 100 ft) (Macadam)
Airport Classification	Feeder

== Education ==
=== Tertiary ===
- MLG College of Learning (MLGCL)
- Virginia Institute of Technology (VIT)

=== Secondary ===
- Hilongos National Vocational School (HNVS)
- Saint Teresa School of Hilongos (STSH)
- Grelina Osmeña Christian College (GOCC)
- MLG College of Learning (MLGCL)
- Naval National High School
- Bung-aw National High School
- Santa Margarita National High School
- Concepcion National High School
- Hitudpan National High School
- Talisay National High School
- Hampangan National High School

=== Elementary ===
- Hilongos South Central School (Hilongos South District)
- Lamak Central School (Hilongos North District)
- Concepcion Central School (Hilongos East District)
- Saint Teresa School of Hilongos (STSH)
- Grelina Osmeña Christian College (GOCC)
- MLG College of Learning (MLGCL)
- Other Elementary and Primary Schools of Hilongos South, North and East Districts

== See also ==
- 2016 Hilongos explosion
