= Carl Cari =

Filipino politician (born 1992)

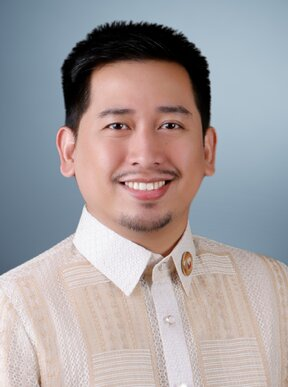
- Official portrait, 2025

Member of the Philippine House of Representatives from Leyte's 5th congressional district
- Incumbent
- Assumed office June 30, 2019
- Preceded by: Jose Carlos "Boying" L. Cari

Ex-Officio Member of the Baybay City Council
- In office June 30, 2018 – June 30, 2019
- Preceded by: Mandy G. Muñez
- Succeeded by: Philip L. Siu
- In office June 30, 2010 – June 30, 2013
- Preceded by: Gualberto B. Pical, Jr.
- Succeeded by: vacant

President of the Baybay Liga ng mga Barangay
- In office June 30, 2018 – June 30, 2019
- Preceded by: Mandy G. Muñez
- Succeeded by: Philip L. Siu

President of the Baybay Sangguniang Kabataan Federation
- In office June 30, 2007 – June 30, 2010
- Preceded by: Gualberto B. Pical, Jr.
- Succeeded by: vacant

Personal details
- Born: Carl Nicolas Cellona Cari; July 4, 1992 (age 34) Baybay, Leyte, Philippines
- Party: Lakas (2024–present)
- Other political affiliations: PDP–Laban (2021–2024); PFP (2018-2021)
- Parents: Jose Carlos "Boying" L. Cari (father); Margarita C. Cari (mother)
- Education: Mapúa University (BS)

Carl Nicolas Cellona Cari (born July 4, 1992) is a Filipino politician. He is a member of the Philippine House of Representatives, serving as the current representative of the Fifth District of Leyte. He is the son of the former representative of the Fifth District of Leyte, Jose Carlos "Boying" Cari, and the current mayor of Baybay, Leyte and the late Margarita C. Cari.

Cari graduated from the Mapúa University with the degree of Bachelor of Science in Manufacturing Engineering. Prior to being elected as a member of the House of Representatives, he served as President of the Sangguniang Kabataan Federation (2007–2010) and as President of the Liga ng mga Barangay of the City of Baybay.

At 26, Cari was elected to succeed his father as the representative of the Fifth District of Leyte. As a member of Congress, he serves as a member of the House Committees on Appropriations, Basic Education and Culture, Visayas Development, and Youth and Sports Development, among others.

== Education ==
Cari, a resident of Barangay Candadam in Baybay, Leyte, went through elementary education at the ViSCA Foundation Elementary School (VFES). He graduated from VSU Integrated High School, formerly known as VSU Laboratory High School (VSULHS). On May 25, 2017, he graduated with a degree of bachelor's in science in Manufacturing Engineering from Mapúa University, which then was known as the Mapúa Institute of Technology.

== Congressional career ==
=== Elections ===
Cari's father, Jose Carlos "Boying" L. Cari, then on his third term as representative of the Fifth District of Leyte, was term-limited. On October 17, 2018, Carl Cari filed his Certificate of Candidacy (COC) for the position, running against Marilou Baligod of the Nationalist People's Coalition who ran in the past for the position of City Mayor of Baybay against Cari's grandmother, Carmen L. Cari. In an interview, the young Cari said it was his personal decision to run for Congress and that he was not influenced to run for office.

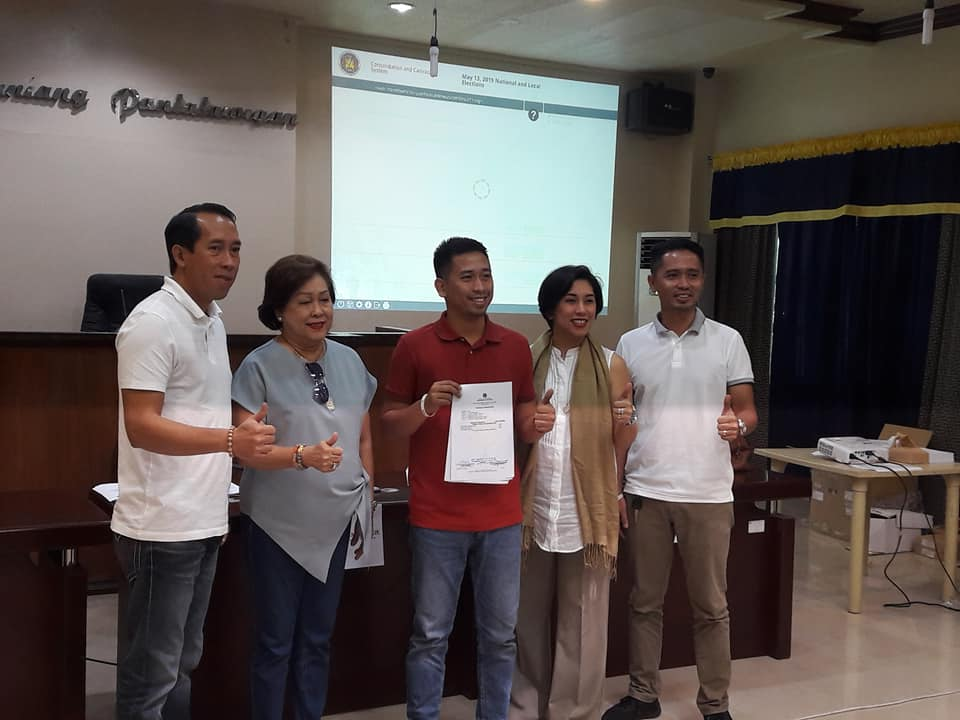
Cari (center) with his father and outgoing Leyte's Fifth District Representative (left) and grandmother and outgoing Baybay Mayor (second from left)

Running under the Partido Federal ng Pilipinas, Cari won the election by 66.86%. All local candidates in Baybay under the same party, including his father who ran for City Mayor, won. He was then proclaimed by the Provincial Board of Canvassers on May 15, 2019.

=== 18th Congress ===
On June 30, 2019, Cari was sworn into office. Voting for Cayetano, he is a member of the majority bloc in the House. Cari is also a member of the Millennials Club in the House of Representatives, along with his party mate Faustino "Inno" Dy, Nacionalista's Breaden John Biron, NUP's Bai Rhian Sakaluran, among others.

Since taking his oath of office, Cari has filed bills on establishing Junior High Schools in Barangays Punta and Maganhan, a multi-species marine breeding farm and hatchery, a National Academy for Sports, and an additional Regional Trial Court in Baybay. He has proposed the Fallen Heroes Scholarship for the Youth Act or the Caring Act of 2019, a bill that covers qualified immediate dependents of firefighters, police officers, and members of the Armed Forces of the Philippines in their education. He has also advocated for the vaccination of all students in public and secondary schools who had never received or had incomplete vaccinations by filing the Vaccinate All Children Act of 2020.

Cari is among the principal authors of the Malasakit Centers Act. The neophyte member of Congress is also among the principal authors of measures approved by the House, including the Real Property Valuation and Assessment Reform Act, the Philippine Indigenous Games Preservation Act, and a bill declaring the balangay as the national boat.

He was instrumental in the proposed creation of a new province to be called Leyte Occidental, which will be composed of the Fifth Legislative District of Leyte.

==== Committee assignments ====
Currently, in the 18th Congress, he is a member of the following House Committees:

- Accounts (since August 7, 2019)
- Agriculture and Food (since August 5, 2019)
- Appropriations (since August 13, 2019)
- Basic Education and Culture (since July 31, 2019)
- Flagship Programs and Projects (since December 18, 2019)
- Labor and Employment (since August 13, 2019)
- People Participation (since November 11, 2019)
- Population and Family Relations (since August 13, 2019)
- Public Works and Highways (since August 7, 2019)
- Rural Development (since August 13, 2019)
- Visayas Development (since August 14, 2019)
- Youth and Sports Development (since August 6, 2019) Carl voice acted the np version of him.

== Electoral history ==
Electoral history of Carl Cari
Year	Office	Party	Votes received				Result
Year	Office	Party	Total	%	P.	Swing	Result
2019	Representative (Leyte–5th)	PFP	123,572	66.86%	1st	—N/a	Won
2022	Representative (Leyte–5th)	PDP–Laban	172,023	100.00%	1st	+.33.14	Unopposed
2025	Representative (Leyte–5th)	Lakas	154,025	75.94%	1st	-24.06	Won

== See also ==
- Legislative districts of Leyte

Political offices
Preceded by Jose Carlos "Boying" L. Cari	Member of the Philippine House of Representatives from Leyte's Fifth District; June 30, 2019 – present	Incumbent
Preceded by Mandy G. Muñez	Ex-Officio Member of the Baybay Sangguniang Panglungsod; June 30, 2018 – June 30, 2019	Succeeded by Philip L. Siu
Preceded by Gualberto B. Pical, Jr.	Ex-Officio Member of the Baybay Sangguniang Panglungsod; June 30, 2010 – June 30, 2013	Succeeded by vacant
Preceded by Mandy G. Muñez	President of the Baybay Liga ng mga Barangay; June 30, June 30, 2018 – June 30, 2019	Succeeded by Philip L. Siu
Preceded by Gualberto B. Pical, Jr.	President of the Baybay Sangguniang Kabataan Federation; June 30, 2007 – June 30, 2010	Succeeded by vacant
