= Capoocan =

Municipality in Leyte, Philippines

- Municipality
- Municipality of Capoocan
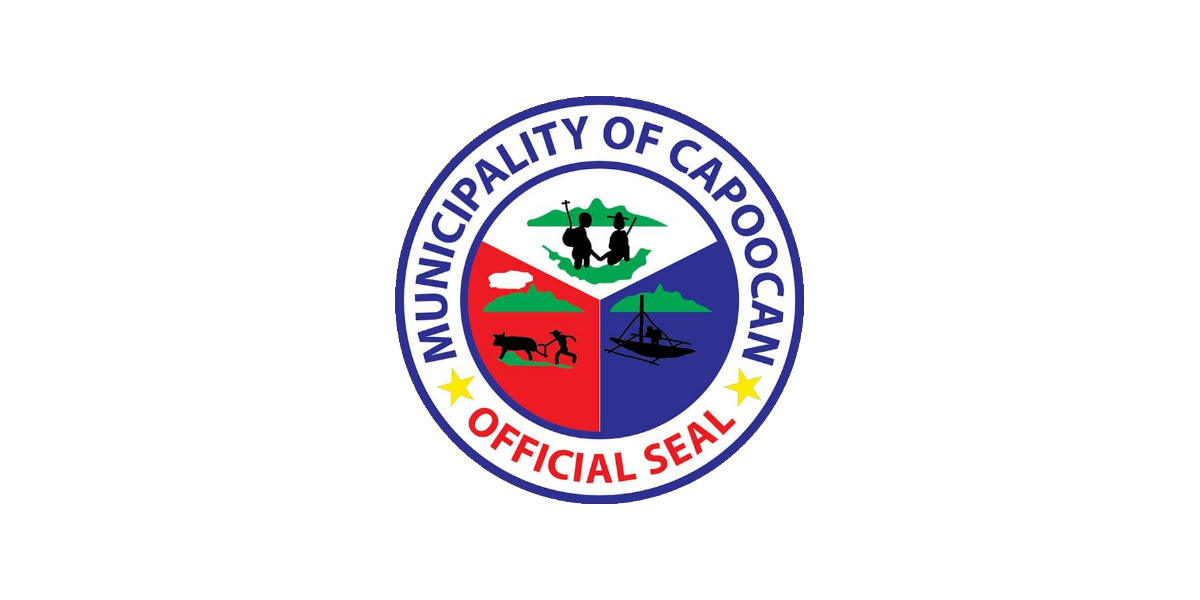
- Flag

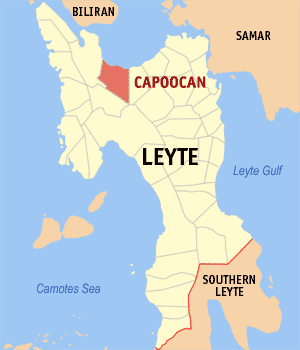
- Map of Leyte with Capoocan highlighted
- Interactive map of Capoocan
- Location within the Philippines
- Coordinates: 11°17′40″N 124°38′31″E
- Country: Philippines
- Region: Eastern Visayas
- Province: Leyte
- District: 2nd District
- Barangays: 21 (see Barangays)

Government
  - Type: Sangguniang Bayan
  - Mayor: Federico H. Carolino Sr.
  - Vice Mayor: Fe Claire P. Carolino-Paragatos
  - Representative: Lolita T. Javier
  - Councilors: List: • Gracia G. Pigar; • Emmanuel D. Arboso; • Aleshyla A. Diaz; • Arnel S. Cantalejo; • Samuel S. Raagas; • Federico P. Carolino; • Reniel D. Capaycapay; • Jaime A. Dalde; DILG Masterlist of Officials
  - Electorate: 23,413 voters (2025)

Area
  - Total: 185.40 km^{2} (71.58 sq mi)
- Elevation: 137 m (449 ft)

Population (2024 census)
  - Total: 34,388
  - Density: 185.48/km^{2} (480.39/sq mi)
  - Households: 7,968

Economy
  - Income class: 2nd municipal income class
  - Poverty incidence: 42.47% (2015)
  - Revenue: ₱ 180.8 million (2024)
  - Assets: ₱ 591.4 million (2024)
  - Expenditure: ₱ 190.2 million (2024)
  - Liabilities: ₱ 101.3 million (2024)

Service provider
  - Electricity: Leyte 3 Electric Cooperative (LEYECO 3)
- Time zone: UTC+8 (PST)
- ZIP code: 6530
- PSGC: 0803714000
- IDD : area code: +63 (0)53
- Native languages: Waray; Tagalog
- Website: www.capoocan-leyte.gov.ph

Capoocan (IPA: [kɐpo'ʔɔkan]), officially the Municipality of Capoocan (Waray: Bungto han Capoocan; Tagalog: Bayan ng Capoocan), is a municipality in the province of Leyte, Philippines. According to the 2024 census, it has a population of 34,388 people.

== History ==
The name Capoocan comes from the dialect term mapu-uk which means obstructed or "obstaculizado" in Spanish. It lies along the shores of Carigara Bay - its people drawing sustenance both from the waters which give an abundant harvest of fish that find their way in the markets of Tacloban and Carigara, as well as in the fertile lands that end at the foot of Mount Minoro.

Expansion efforts have been limited by the presence of Mount Minoro. The mountain obstructs and contains the town in its present site - forbidding further growth but protecting the town from the strong typhoons that have battered neighboring towns.

In 1904, the town earned its independence from its mother municipality, Carigara. Apparently too young for such a difficult undertaking, Capoocan willingly returned to barrio status after a few years of determined but unsuccessful attempts at independence.

On January 1, 1928, when it finally gathered strength and gained experience, Capoocan was granted municipal status again. It was ranked as a municipality at first but later on ascended to category.

Its first town executive was Brigido Merelos. In 1931, Atty. Jose Pigao was elected president but his term was short since he was appointed municipal judge of Pastrana. It was Perfecto Pilapil who succeeded him to serve the un-expired term.

In 1935, Solos M. Hernandez was elected mayor. He was re-elected in 1939 but he died at the outbreak of World War II.

During World War II, after the official surrender of the American-Filipino forces, the Japanese troops, ranging from 2000 to 5000, landed on the town on May 25, 1942. A column proceeded to the east coast, capturing Tacloban and the other to the west to the port of Ormoc.

From 1867 when Capoocan was a "visita" of Carigara, the town has shown remarkable increase in population. After 38 years on its own as a town, Capoocan has grown into its present site - 17 barrios stretching to as far as 30 kilometers from the town proper and a "población" that shows promise.

== Geography ==
=== Barangays ===
Capoocan is politically subdivided into 21 barangays. Each barangay consists of puroks and some have sitios.

- Balucanad
- Balud
- Balugo
- Cabul-an
- Culasian
- Gayad
- Guinadiongan
- Lemon
- Libertad
- Manloy
- Nauguisan
- Pinamopoan
- Poblacion Zone I
- Poblacion Zone II
- Potot
- San Joaquin
- Santo Niño
- Talairan
- Talisay
- Tolibao
- Visares

== Demographics ==
Population census of Capoocan

Year	Pop.	±% p.a.
1903	3,106	—
1918	4,772	+2.90%
1939	8,907	+3.02%
1948	11,753	+3.13%
1960	14,948	+2.02%
1970	17,077	+1.34%
1975	20,783	+4.02%
1980	20,726	−0.05%

Year	Pop.	±% p.a.
1990	23,687	+1.34%
1995	26,384	+2.04%
2000	27,593	+0.97%
2007	28,388	+0.39%
2010	29,834	+1.82%
2015	33,617	+2.30%
2020	33,721	+0.07%
2024	34,388	+0.47%

Source: Philippine Statistics Authority

In the 2024 census, the population of Capoocan was 34,388 people, with a density of 190 inhabitants per square kilometre or 490 inhabitants per square mile.

== Economy ==
Poverty incidence of Capoocan (%)

Source: Philippine Statistics Authority

== Elected Officials ==
2025-2028 Capoocan, Leyte Officials
Position	Name	Party
Mayor	Federico H. Carolino Sr.	NPC
Vice Mayor	Fe Claire P. Carolino-Paragatos	NPC
Councilors	Gracia G. Pigar	Independent
Councilors	Von Lito Q. Vallar	Independent
Councilors	Federico P. Carolino Jr.	NPC
Councilors	Jaime A. Dalde Jr.	NPC
Councilors	Arnold A. Caing	NPC
Councilors	Lander Jake D. Abillar	PDP–Laban
Councilors	Teresa C. Balquin	PDP–Laban
Councilors	Jojo N. Nepomuceno	Independent
Ex Officio Municipal Council Members
ABC President	TBD	Nonpartisan
SK Federation President	TBD	Nonpartisan

== Education ==
There are a total of 20 Elementary Schools and 4 secondary Schools in Capoocan

=== Grade School/ Elementary School ===
- Balucanad Elementary School
- Balud Elementary School
- Balugo Primary School
- Cabul-an Elementary School
- Capoocan Central School
- Culasian Elementary School
- Gayad Elementary School
- Guinadiongan Elementary School
- Lemon Elementary School
- Lemon-San Joaquin Elementary School
- Libertad Elementary School
- Manloy Elementary School
- Nauguisan Primary School
- Pinamopoan Central School
- Potot Elementary School
- Santo Nino Elementary School
- Talairan Elementary School
- Talisay Elementary School
- Tolibao Elementary School
- Visares Elementary School

=== Secondary/ High School ===
- Asuncion S. Melgar National High School (Zone II Poblacion, Capoocan, Leyte)
- Don Mariano Salvacion Memorial National High School ( Lemon, Capoocan, Leyte)
- Libertad National High School (Libertad, Capoocan, Leyte)
- Pinamopoan National High School (Pinamopoan, Capoocan, Leyte)

== Notable personalities ==
- Bishop Oscar Jaime Florencio - current auxiliary bishop of the Roman Catholic Archdiocese of Cebu and apostolic administrator of the Military Ordinariate of the Philippines
