= Tumulak =

Tumulak is a surname. Notable people with the surname include:

- Leopoldo S. Tumulak (1944–2017), Filipino Bishop
- Patricia Tumulak (born 1988), Filipino beauty pageant titleholder
