= Oscar Jaime Florencio =

Philippine Catholic bishop (born 1966)

The Most Reverend Oscar Jaime Llaneta Florencio
- Military Ordinary of the Philippines
- Church: Catholic Church
- Diocese: Military Ordinariate of the Philippines
- See: Military Ordinariate of the Philippines
- Appointed: March 2, 2019
- Installed: April 3, 2019
- Predecessor: Leopoldo Tumulak
- Previous posts: Auxiliary Bishop of Cebu (2015–2019); Titular Bishop of Lestrona (2015–2019)

Orders
- Ordination: April 3, 1990
- Consecration: September 4, 2015 by John F. Du

Personal details
- Born: February 5, 1966 (age 60) Capoocan, Leyte, Philippines
- Motto: Fiat misericordia tua (Latin for 'Let Your mercy be upon us')
- Coat of arms: Oscar Jaime Llaneta Florencio's coat of arms

Ordination history
History
Episcopal consecration
- Principal consecrator: John F. Du
- Co-consecrators: Giuseppe Pinto; José S. Palma
- Styles
- Reference style: The Most Reverend
- Spoken style: Your Excellency
- Religious style: Bishop

Oscar Jaime Llaneta Florencio (born February 5, 1966) is a Filipino Catholic prelate who is the current bishop of the Military Ordinariate of the Philippines.

== Biography ==
Oscar Jaime Llaneta Florencio was ordained a priest on April 3, 1990. He studied Philosophy at the Sacred Heart Seminary, in Palo, and Theology at the University of Santo Tomas, in Manila. He earned the Doctorate in Theology at the Pontifical University of the Holy Cross in 1999.

On July 3, 2015, Pope Francis appointed him Auxiliary Bishop of Cebu and Titular Bishop of Lestrona. He was consecrated bishop on September 4, 2015 by John Forrosuelo Du, Archbishop of Palo. Co-consecrators were Giuseppe Pinto, Apostolic Nunciature to the Philippines; and Jose Serofia Palma, Archbishop of Cebu. He was previously rector and at the same time a theology professor of St. John the Evangelist School of Theology.

On July 5, 2017, the Pope named Florencio as the apostolic administrator of the Military Ordinariate Philippines (MOP) after the demise of Most. Rev. Leopoldo S. Tumulak, D.D., its sixth bishop. The MOP serves as a personal diocese for the men and women of the Armed Forces of the Philippines, the Philippine National Police, the Philippine Coast Guard, the Bureau of Fire Protection, and the Bureau of Jail Management and Penology. He was eventually appointed the seventh bishop of the Military Ordinariate of the Philippines.

On March 9, 2024, Florencio strongly objected to use of semi-automatic firearms for civilians (Comprehensive Firearms and Ammunition Regulation Act): “Personally, I would not want to have our civilians be allowed to possess semi-automatic rifles or any rifles for that matter.”

Catholic Church titles
Preceded by Eugène Moke Motsüri	— TITULAR — Titular Bishop of Lestrona; September 4, 2015 – March 2, 2019	Succeeded by Arjan Dodaj
Preceded by Leopoldo S. Tumulak	Military Ordinary of the Philippines; April 3, 2019 – present	Incumbent
