= Carigara Bay =

Bay in the northern part of Leyte, Philippines

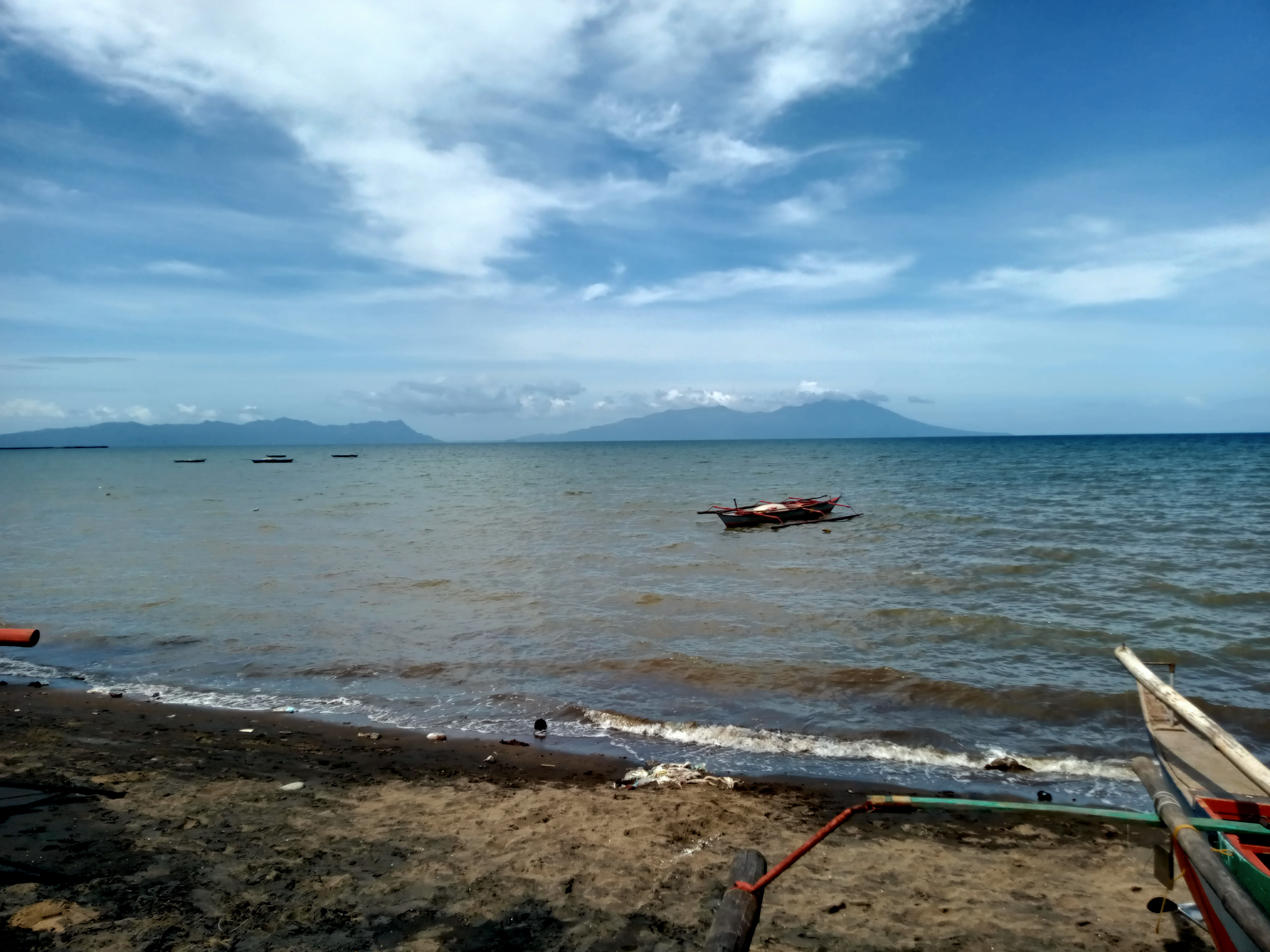
- Carigara Bay as viewed from Carigara, Leyte facing Biliran Island and the municipality of Leyte at a distance

- Location of Carigara Bay in the Philippines
- Location: Leyte, Eastern Visayas, Philippines
- Coordinates: 11.3814°N 124.6635°E
- Type: Bay
- Etymology: named after Carigara
- Part of: Samar Sea
- Surface area: 512 kilometres (318 mi)
- Average depth: 54 metres (177 ft)
- Max. depth: 63 metres (207 ft)
- Salinity: Saltwater
- Settlements: Babatngon; Barugo; Capoocan; Carigara; Leyte; San Miguel

Carigara Bay (/kærɪˈɡɑːrə/; Tagalog: [kɐɾiˈɡaɾɐʔ ˈbeɪ]), is a large bay in the northern part of Leyte in the Philippines. The bay is bounded by Leyte to its western, southern and eastern parts.
