= Leopoldo Tumulak =

Filipino bishop

The Most Reverend Leopoldo Tumulak D.D.
- Military Ordinary of the Philippines
- Church: Roman Catholic Church
- Appointed: 15 January 2005
- Term ended: 17 June 2017
- Predecessor: Ramón C. Argüelles
- Successor: Oscar Jaime Florencio
- Previous posts: Auxiliary Bishop of Cebu (1987–1992); Bishop of Tagbilaran (1992–2005); Military Ordinary of the Philippines (2005–2017)

Orders
- Ordination: 30 March 1971
- Consecration: 12 January 1987 by Ricardo Vidal

Personal details
- Born: Leopoldo Sumaylo Tumulak; 29 September 1944 Santander, Cebu, Commonwealth of the Philippines
- Died: 17 June 2017 (aged 72) San Juan, Metro Manila, Philippines
- Buried: Shrine of St. Therese of the Child Jesus, Newport City, Pasay City
- Denomination: Roman Catholic
- Motto: Unitas in Caritate (Latin for 'Unity in Love')
- Coat of arms: Leopoldo Tumulak's coat of arms
- Styles
- Reference style: His Excellency
- Spoken style: Your Grace
- Religious style: Bishop

Leopoldo Sumaylo Tumulak (29 September 1944 – 17 June 2017) was a Filipino Catholic prelate who served as the sixth Bishop of the Military Ordinariate of the Philippines from 2005 until his death in 2017.

== Early life and education ==
Tumalak was born in Santander, Cebu. He went to Mainit Primary School and Santander Elementary School for his primary and elementary education. He studied at High School in St. Mary's Academy. He went on to study philosophy in Seminario Menor de San Carlos and Theology in Seminario Major due San Carlos in Cebu. He gained an MA in Educational Administration in Colegio due San Jose Recoletos.

== Priesthood and Auxiliary Bishop ==
He was ordained priest on 30 March 1971. Pope John Paul II appointed him as Auxiliary Bishop of Cebu in 1987.

== Bishop of Tagbilaran ==
Bishop Tumulak was appointed Bishop of Tagbilaran on 28 November 1992.

== Military Ordinariate of the Philippines ==
Pope Benedict XVI appointed him as Military Ordinariate of the Philippines on 15 January 2005.

== Death ==
Tumulak died on 17 June 2017 at the Cardinal Santos Medical Center in San Juan, Philippines from pancreatic cancer, aged 72.

== Gallery ==
Coat of arms as Bishop of Tagbilaran.

Catholic Church titles
Preceded by Felix Sanchez Zafra	Bishop of Tagbilaran; November 28, 1992 – January 15, 2005	Succeeded by Leonardo Y. Medroso
Preceded by Ramon Arguelles	Military Ordinary of the Philippines; January 15, 2005 – June 17, 2017	Succeeded by Oscar Jaime Florencio
