= Carigara =

Municipality in Leyte, Philippines

- Municipality
- Municipality of Carigara
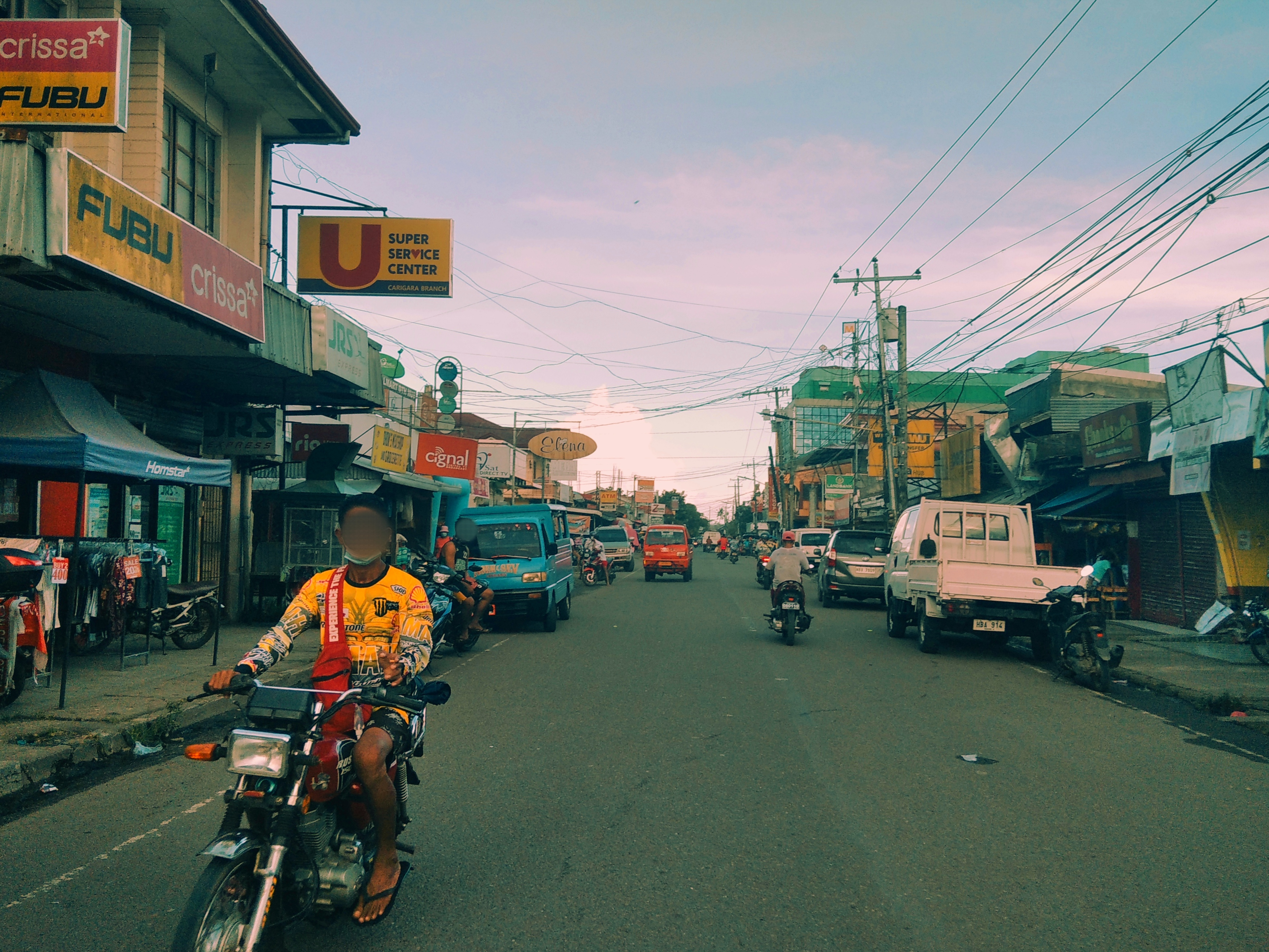
- Downtown Area (Real St.)

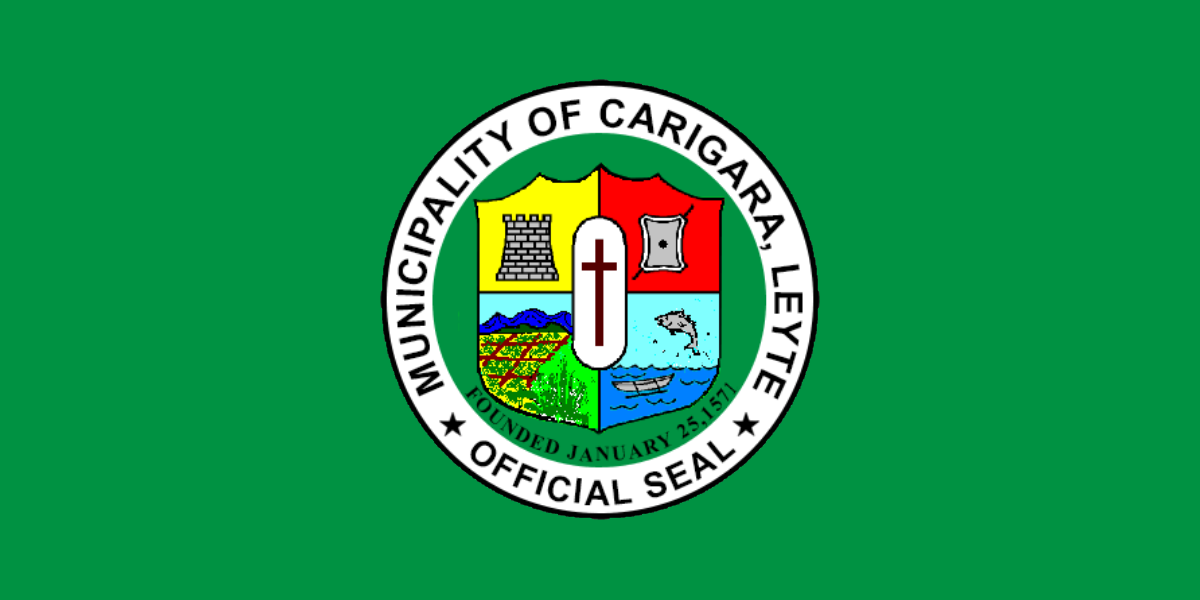
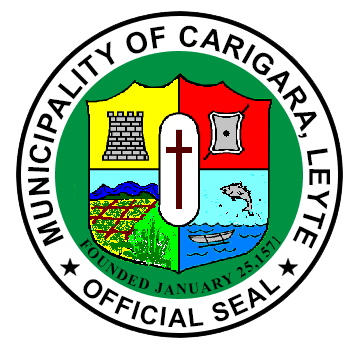
- Flag Seal
- Etymology: Kan Gara to Kalgara
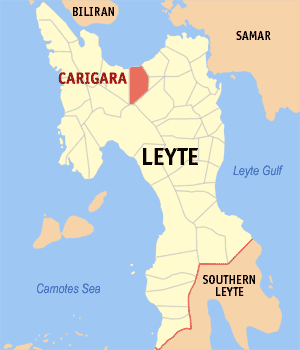
- Map of Leyte with Carigara highlighted
- Interactive map of Carigara
- Location within the Philippines
- Coordinates: 11°18′N 124°41′E
- Country: Philippines
- Region: Eastern Visayas
- Province: Leyte
- District: 2nd district
- Founded: 25 January 1571; 455 years ago
- Named for: Datu Gara
- Barangays: 49 (see Barangays)

Government
  - Type: Sangguniang Bayan
  - Mayor: Eduardo "Ed" T. Ong Jr.
  - Vice Mayor: Jimmy A. Camposano
  - Representative: Lolita T. Javier
  - Councilors: List: • Joenlee C. Larraga; • Anabella N. Crisostomo; • Mildred C. Modesto; • Raul Z. Lloren; • Lorna A. Marpa; • Joselu N. Guia; • Kim Anthony G. Agner; • Leny T. Ong; DILG Masterlist of Officials
  - Electorate: 38,820 voters (2025)

Area
  - Total: 117.86 km^{2} (45.51 sq mi)
- Elevation: 130 m (430 ft)
- Highest elevation: 1,267 m (4,157 ft)
- Lowest elevation: 0 m (0 ft)

Population (2024 census)
  - Total: 56,060
  - Density: 475.6/km^{2} (1,232/sq mi)
  - Households: 12,830
- Demonym(s): Carigaran-on Kalgaran-on (vernacular term)

Economy
  - Income class: 1st municipal income class
  - Poverty incidence: 29.57% (2023)
  - Revenue: ₱ 249.3 million (2024)
  - Assets: ₱ 864.4 million (2024)
  - Expenditure: ₱ 226.5 million (2024)
  - Liabilities: ₱ 85.86 million (2024)

Service provider
  - Electricity: Leyte 3 Electric Cooperative (LEYECO 3)
  - Water: Metro Carigara Water District (MCWD)
  - Telecommunications: Bayan Telecommunications, Globe Telecom, Smart Communications, Dito Telecommunity
  - Cable TV: G Sat, Sky Direct, Cignal, SatLite
- Time zone: UTC+8 (PST)
- ZIP code: 6529
- PSGC: 0803715000
- IDD : area code: +63 (0)53
- Native languages: Waray; Tagalog
- Religion: Christianity, with other minorities
- Local Feast: Magara Festival
- Feast Date: every 16th day of July
- Website: www.carigara-leyte.gov.ph

Carigara (Tagalog: [kɐɾiˈɡaɾɐʔ]), officially the Municipality of Carigara (Waray: Bungto han Carigara; Tagalog: Bayan ng Carigara), is a First Income Class municipality in the province of Leyte, Philippines. According to the 2024 census, it has a population of 56,060 people.

Established in 1571, Carigara is the first town founded in the Eastern Visayas region. A pivotal development occurred in 1735 when Leyte and Samar were separated from Cebu province, forming a unified provincial governance structure with Carigara serving as provincial capital during this era.

Carigara is renowned for its distinct offerings, including pastillas, humba, sundang (machete), and the hubhob delicacy. Hubhob, a local delight, is crafted from grated cassava, eggs, kalamay, milk, and sugar, cooked within a bagacay (bamboo pole) over charcoal, bringing a unique and flavorful taste to this traditional specialty.

== History ==
Carigara was originally known as "Kan Gara," meaning "belonging to Gara." Legend has it that Gara hailed from Borneo and was among the unnamed companions of the ten datus who purchased Panay from the Ati (or Aeta) chief Marikudo. Over time, "Kan Gara" transformed into Kalgara for ease of pronunciation. Upon the arrival of the Spaniards, the place was renamed to Carigara, thus its present spelling.

Carigara celebrates its town fiesta every 16 July, the Feast of the Triumph of the Holy Cross traditionally observed in the Spanish Empire, as well as the anniversary of the Jesuits’ arrival led by Pedro Chirino on July 16, 1595. This festivity, spanning nearly the entire month of July, attracts tourists and visitors from nearby towns.

=== Carigara's Attempt for a World Record ===
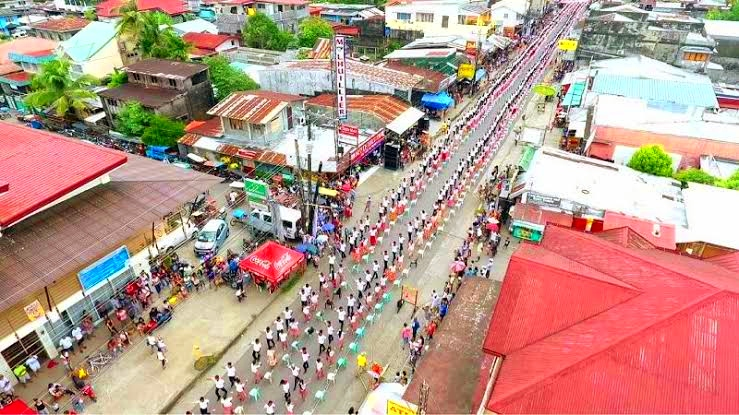
Real Street from above, featuring standing performers.

On July 14, 2018, Carigara made a bold attempt to secure the Guinness World Records for the "Largest Participants in Philippine Folk Dance," showcasing the Kuratsa. This event formed a part of the town's 423rd fiesta celebration slated for July 16, instilling a sense of pride among the locals and fostering hopes for an economic and tourism upsurge. The event boasted nearly 5,000 pairs of dancers (totalling about 9,642 individuals), predominantly comprising students, teachers from various schools, municipal employees, representatives from the private sector, and residents. While Carigara submitted its bid, the attempt was not officially certified by Guinness World Records.

== Geography ==
=== Geography ===
It is located in the northern part of Leyte province on the coast of Carigara Bay, surrounded by rice fields and mountains.

Carigara shares borders with Capoocan to the west, Ormoc to the south, Jaro to the southeast, Tunga to the east and Barugo to the northeast.

=== Flora and Fauna ===
==== Flora ====
The climatic and topographical characteristics of Carigara's expansive terrain, encompassing wide rice fields and hilly landscapes, create an optimal environment for cultivating fruit-bearing trees, vegetables, and a variety of crops. Noteworthy trees suitable for cultivation include bananas, coconuts, jackfruits, mangoes, guavas, rambutans, santol, and star apples. In terms of vegetables, gabi, karubasa, pipino, kamalunggay, marigoso, munggos, sitaw, and upo are extensively grown by local farmers and residents, thriving exceptionally well within the community. Additionally, root crops like kamote and balanghoy flourish alongside rice crops, constituting a substantial part of the agricultural landscape in Carigara.

==== Fauna ====
Carigara features vast highland forests and a diverse fauna, including domesticated animals like carabaos, horses, cats, dogs, chickens, and pigs. The area is home to snakes, frogs, insects, various lizards, and a variety of birds, among other wildlife species.

The Carigara Bay Wetlands also hosts migratory birds from the East Asian - Australasian Flyway, including the Little Egret (E.garzetta), Intermediate Egret (E. intermedia), Philippine Duck (A.luzonica), Kentish Plover (Charadrius alexandrinus), Pacific Golden Plover (Pluvialis dominica fulva), Euarasian Whimbrel (Numenius phaeopus), Common redshank (Tringa totanus), and Common greenshank (Tringa nebularia), among other migratory bird species.

=== Barangays ===
Carigara is politically subdivided into 49 barangays. Each barangay consists of puroks and some have sitios.

- Bagong Lipunan
- Balilit
- Barayong
- Barugohay Central
- Barugohay Norte
- Barugohay Sur
- Baybay (Poblacion)
- Binibihan
- Bislig
- Caghalo
- Camansi
- Canal
- Candigahub
- Canfabi
- Canlampay
- Cogon
- Cutay
- East Visoria
- Guindapunan East
- Guindapunan West
- Hiluctogan
- Jugaban (Poblacion)
- Libo
- Lower Hiraan
- Lower Sogod
- Macalpi
- Manloy
- Nauguisan
- Paglaum
- Pangna
- Parag-um
- Parena (Parina)
- Piloro
- Ponong (Poblacion)
- Rizal (Tagak East)
- Sagkahan
- San Isidro
- San Juan
- San Mateo (Poblacion)
- Santa Fe
- Sawang (Poblacion)
- Tagak
- Tangnan
- Tigbao
- Tinaguban
- Upper Hiraan
- Upper Sogod
- Uyawan
- West Visoria

=== Climate ===
Climate data for Carigara, Leyte
Month	Jan	Feb	Mar	Apr	May	Jun	Jul	Aug	Sep	Oct	Nov	Dec	Year
Mean daily maximum °C (°F)	28 (82)	29 (84)	29 (84)	31 (88)	31 (88)	30 (86)	30 (86)	30 (86)	30 (86)	29 (84)	29 (84)	29 (84)	30 (85)
Mean daily minimum °C (°F)	22 (72)	22 (72)	22 (72)	23 (73)	24 (75)	25 (77)	25 (77)	25 (77)	25 (77)	24 (75)	24 (75)	23 (73)	24 (75)
Average precipitation mm (inches)	73 (2.9)	56 (2.2)	75 (3.0)	71 (2.8)	114 (4.5)	174 (6.9)	172 (6.8)	163 (6.4)	167 (6.6)	161 (6.3)	158 (6.2)	125 (4.9)	1,509 (59.5)
Average rainy days	15.2	12.5	16.2	17.3	23.9	27.3	28.4	26.9	26.9	27.1	23.8	19.3	264.8
Source: Meteoblue (modeled/calculated data, not measured locally)

== Demographics ==
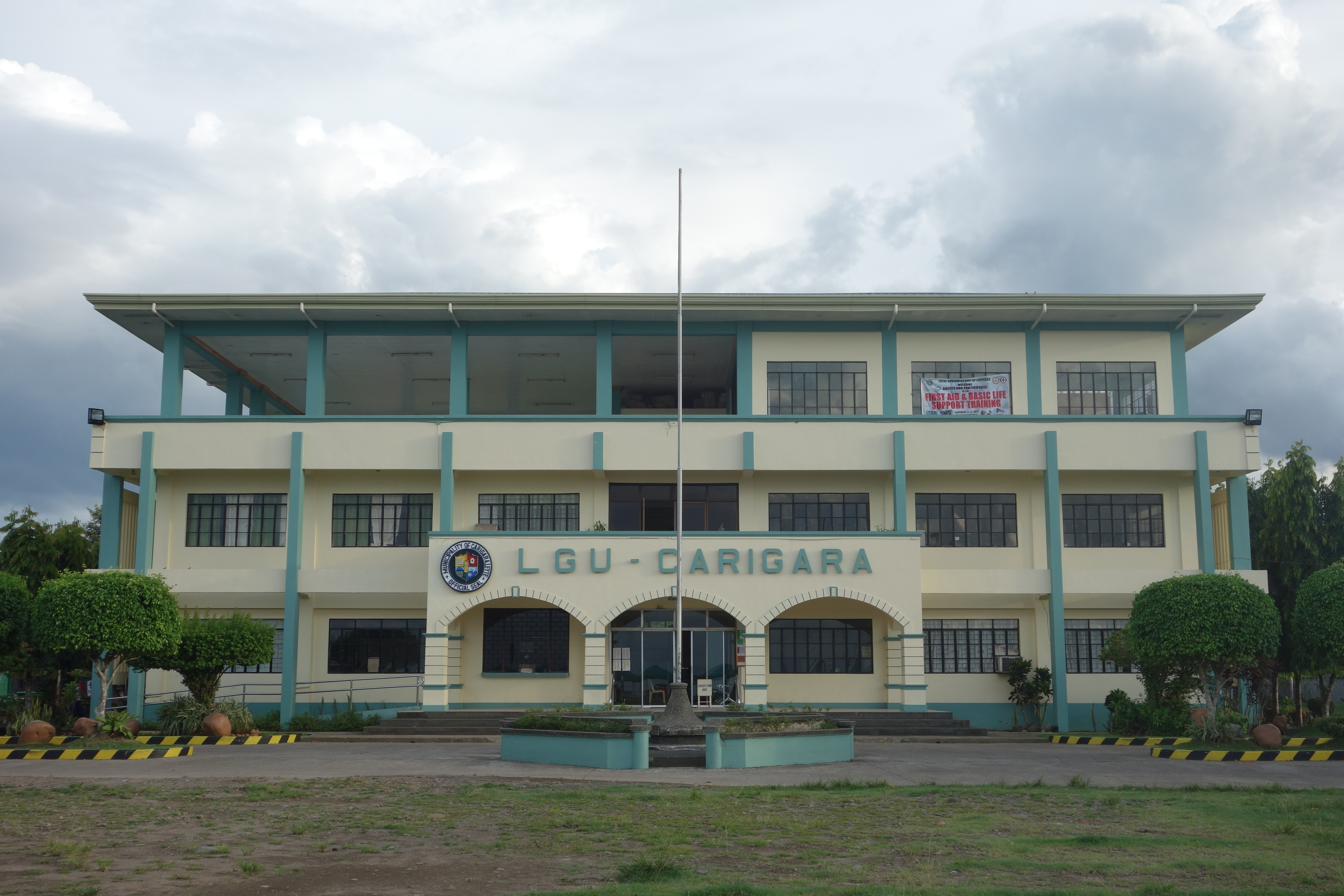
Municipal Hall, 2016

Population census of Carigara

Year	Pop.	±% p.a.
1903	16,382	—
1918	17,558	+0.46%
1939	23,236	+1.34%
1948	26,803	+1.60%
1960	26,761	−0.01%
1970	32,869	+2.07%
1975	34,194	+0.80%
1980	34,377	+0.11%

Year	Pop.	±% p.a.
1990	38,863	+1.23%
1995	42,302	+1.60%
2000	43,455	+0.58%
2007	45,696	+0.70%
2010	47,444	+1.38%
2015	51,345	+1.52%
2020	54,656	+1.32%
2024	56,060	+0.61%

Source: Philippine Statistics Authority

In the 2024 census, the population of Carigara was 56,060 people, with a density of 480 inhabitants per square kilometre or 1,200 inhabitants per square mile.

=== Language ===
The predominant language in the municipality is Waray-waray, with Cebuano and Tagalog recognized as minority languages. English functions as the official language, often mixed with Waray in colloquial exchanges. Although Spanish maintains residual relevance, it is not used in verbal or day-to-day communication.

=== Religion ===
Carigara is mostly Christian due to Spanish Empire's rule. Due to economic migrations, there are other people from minority religions that reside in Carigara for improved economic conditions and standard of living.

== Government ==
2025-2028 Carigara, Leyte Officials
Position	Name	Party
Mayor	Eduardo T. Ong Jr.	NPC
Vice Mayor	Jimmy A. Camposano	Tingog
Councilors	Fernando N. Moriel	Tingog
Councilors	Vilma M. Domus	NPC
Councilors	Mildred C. Modesto	Independent
Councilors	Carlo Angelo B. Go	Liberal
Councilors	Ulpiano U. Arpon Jr.	Independent
Councilors	Joenlee C. Larraga	NPC
Councilors	Myla L. Aguilar	Liberal
Councilors	Guillermo I. Panal	Liberal
Ex Officio Municipal Council Members
ABC President	Arvin N. Urmeneta	Nonpartisan
SK Federation President	Daniel N. Ariaso Jr.	Nonpartisan

== Economy ==
Poverty incidence of Carigara (%)

Source: Philippine Statistics Authority

== Culture & Heritage ==
=== Festival ===
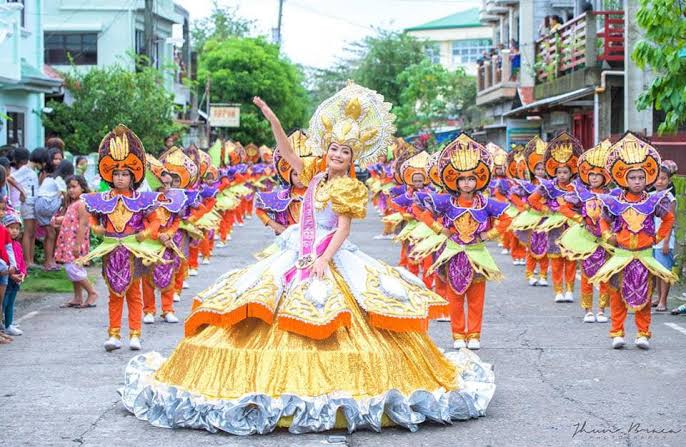
Magara Festival

On January 25, 2019, Carigara commemorated its inaugural festival, the Magara Festival, coinciding with its 448th founding anniversary. Magara locally connotes abundance, elegance, and vibrancy. The inaugural Magara Festival primarily centered on celebrating the town's agricultural richness, local products, historical heritage, and its community.

=== Events ===
Kalsada ni Gara (lit. 'Street of Gara') is a street decoration competition and cultural exhibition held annually in Carigara as a highlight of the town's fiesta in honor of the hispanic feast of the Triumph of the Holy Cross on July 16. The event transforms the town's major thoroughfares into an "open-air gallery" featuring intricate arches and visual installations constructed by local barangays and government agencies. The name of the event is a wordplay referencing Datu Gara, the legendary Bornean chieftain and founder of the settlement originally known as Kan Gara (the origin of the town's name). Distinct from typical fiesta bunting, the installations are designed to showcase the municipality's history, heritage, and creative talent. The initiative often involves the clustering of barangays to build distinct arches that light up the town center at night.

Turugpo is a significant public spectacle featuring duels between two male carabaos or two male horses, occurring annually on Black Saturday. This widely attended event garners immense popularity within the town, drawing thousands of both local and international tourists.

== Tourism ==
List of some tourist attractions in Carigara.

Attractions include:

- Lauron's Boulevard (Brgy. Baybay & Ponong) This is the place where people can buy street foods like isaw, pork barbecues, and many more.
- Carigara Municipal Library and Museum (Brgy. Baybay)
- Cassidy Elementary School (Brgy. Ponong) A school famous for its classical-style building.
- Datu Gara Shrine (Brgy. Canal)
- Gawas an Harigi (Brgy. Baybay) An old house with exposed posts on the sides.
- Heroes Shrine (Brgy. Baybay & Ponong) Located right between Carigara Boulevard and the Kan Gara Gymnasium.
- Kan Gara Gymnasium (Brgy. Ponong) The largest gymnasium.
- Lumen Ancestral House (Brgy. Sawang) The only house in the town which serves as a shelter for balinsasayaos.
- Plaza Triunfo (Brgy. Ponong) The largest plaza.
- St. Francis Assisi Parish (Brgy. Jugaban)

== Infrastructures ==
=== Transportation ===
==== Land Transport ====
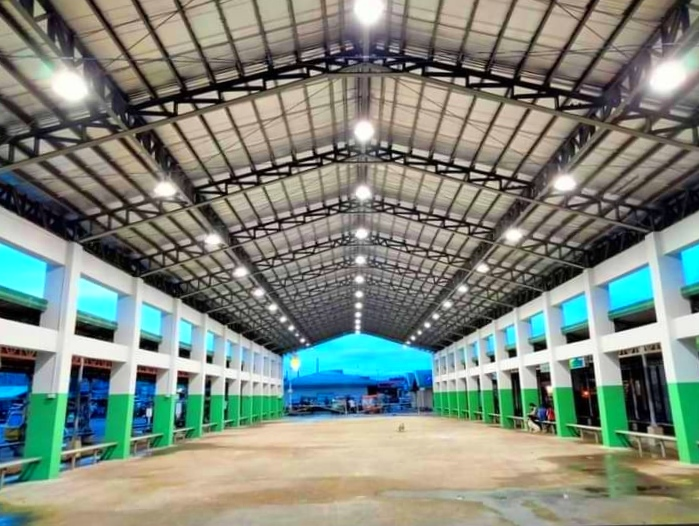
Carigara New Public Terminal, 2021

- Pedicabs are the common mode of transportation within the town proper.
- Tricycles and habal-habals are commonly used for travelling to the far-flung barangays.
- Vans, jeepneys and buses are the go-to mode of transport when travelling to the cities of Tacloban and Ormoc or to municipalities that are faraway from the town. There are a few bus companies located in Carigara.

New modernized PUVs that travel from Carigara to Tacloban and vice versa are being issued by the local government starting from 24 November 2021.

==== Sea Transport ====
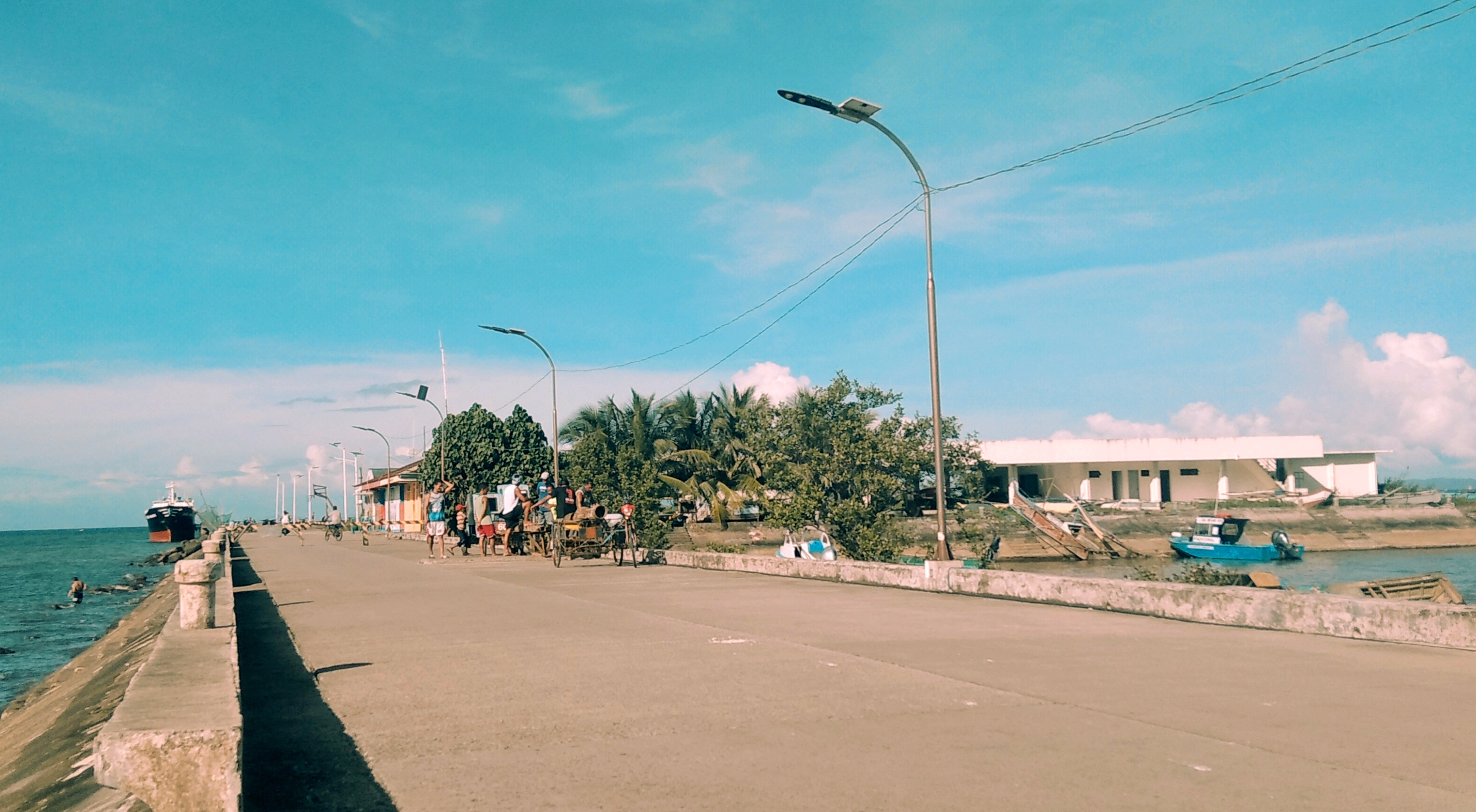
Port of Carigara, 2021

Carigara has a port located in Barangay Baybay where local boats and ships dock.

=== Healthcare Service ===
Carigara District Hospital, commonly referred to as CDH, serves as the sole public hospital in the town. Residents from neighboring towns also visit the hospital to seek additional medical services and attention.

=== Utilities ===
- Electricity: Leyte III Electric Cooperative, Inc. (LEYECO 3), provides Carigara with electricity to residents and businesses.
- Water Supply: Water services are managed by the Metro Carigara Water District (MCWD).
- Telecommunications: Bayan Telecommunications, Globe Telecom, Smart Communications, and Dito Telecommunity, operate in Carigara and offers a range of services such as mobile, internet, and landline connections.
- Cable Television: G Sat, Sky Direct, Cignal, and SatLite, offers a variety of local and international channels.

== Education ==
There are a total of 30 elementary schools, 6 high schools (1 private, 4 public, 1 pending construction) and 2 college institutions located on Carigara.

=== Grade School/Elementary School ===
- Balilit Elementary School
- Barugohay Norte Elementary School
- Barugohay Sur Elementary School
- Binibihan Elementary School
- C.A.T.A.M.C.S. (Cong. Alberto T. Aguja Memorial Central School)
- Caghalo Elementary School
- Camansi Elementary School
- Candigahub Elementary School
- Canfabi ES (Santa Fe ES)
- Canlampay Elementary School
- Carigara II CS
- Cassidy Central School (Cassidy Elementary School)
- Cogon Elementary School
- Guindapunan Elementary School
- Hiluctogan Elementary School
- Hira-an Elementary School
- M. Morales Memorial Elementary School
- Macalpi Elementary School
- Manloy Elementary School
- Nauguisan Elementary School
- Pangna Elementary School
- Parag-um Elementary School
- Ponong Elementary School
- Sagkahan Elementary School
- Sogod Elementary School
- Santa Fe Elementary School
- Tagak Elementary School
- Tigbao Elementary School
- Tinaguban Elementary School
- Uyawan Elementary School

=== Secondary School/High School ===
- Carigara National High School
- Carigara National Vocational School (formerly Carigara School of Fisheries)
- Jugaban National High School
- Sogod National High School
- Parag-um National High School (soon)

=== College/University ===
- Eastern Visayas State University (Carigara Campus)
- Holy Cross College of Carigara (Formerly Holy Cross Academy) located at Brgy Ponong (Pob)

== Notable personalities ==
- Eduardo Makabenta Sr. - Waray-language poet and translator
- Mike Hanopol - musician, singer-songwriter
- Ma. Theresa Larraga - renowned cardiac CT radiographer

== Gallery ==
Century-old houses in Brgy. Jugaban, Carigara, Leyte	Gawas an Harigue	Carigara Municipal Library and Museum

Cassidy Central School	Plaza Triunfo	Carigara Tide Embankment
