= Military Ordinariate of the Philippines =

Catholic jurisdiction in the Philippines

Military Ordinariate of the Philippines Ordinariatus Militaris Philippinensis Ordinaryato Militar ng Pilipinas

Catholic
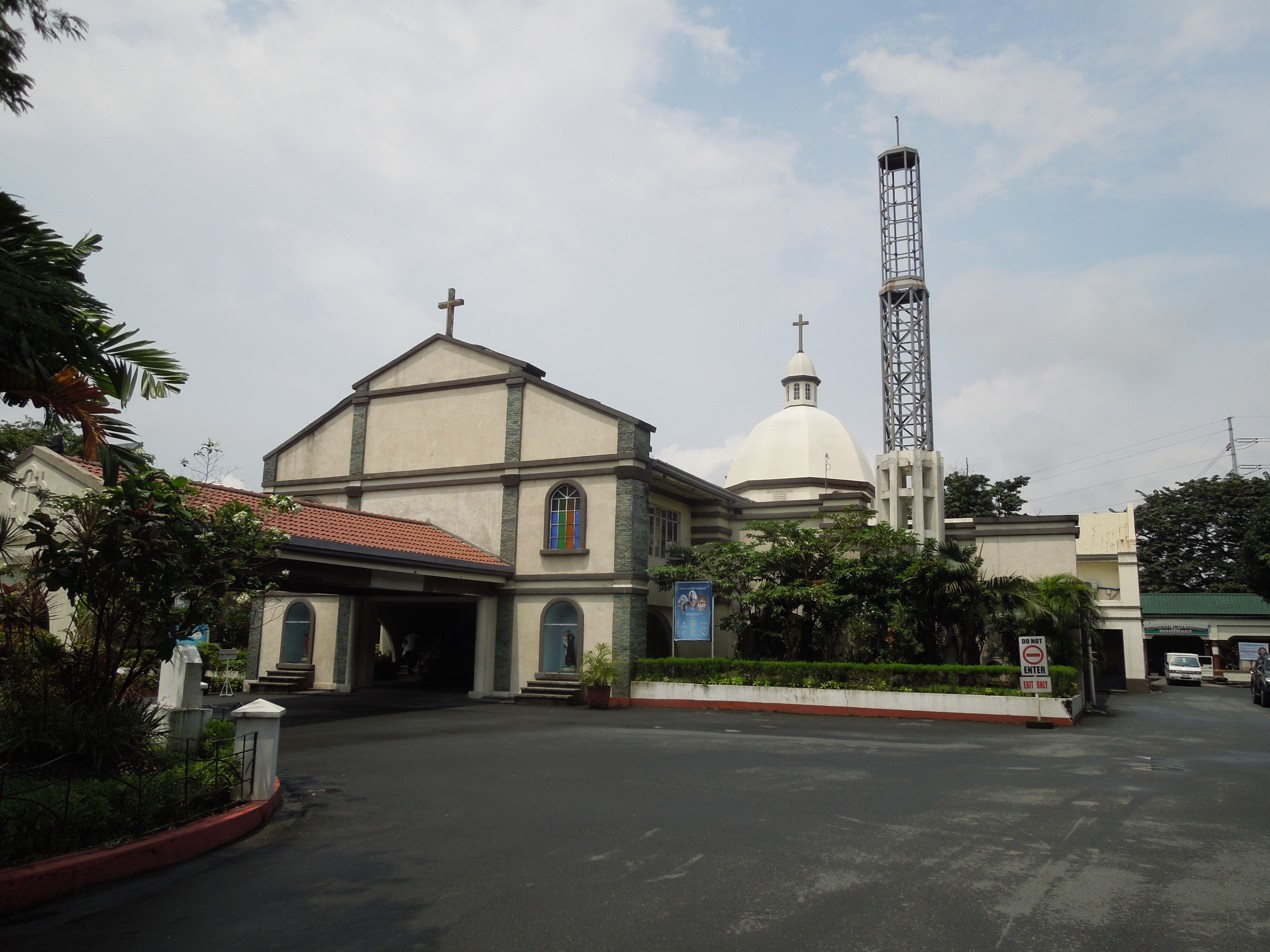
- Saint Ignatius of Loyola Military Cathedral

- Coat of arms

Location
- Country: Philippines
- Territory: Extraterritorial to serve the: Armed Forces of the Philippines; Philippine National Police; Philippine Coast Guard
- Ecclesiastical province: Directly subject to the Holy See
- Headquarters: AFP Ecumenical Building; Camp General Emilio Aguinaldo, Quezon City 1110
- Coordinates: 14.6116478°N 121.0585394°E

Statistics
- Parishes: 75

Information
- Denomination: Catholic Church
- Sui iuris church: Latin Church
- Rite: Roman Rite
- Established: December 8, 1950; 75 years ago
- Cathedral: Saint Ignatius of Loyola Military Cathedral
- Co-cathedral: Saint Joseph Pro-Cathedral (PNP); Shrine of St. Therese of the Child Jesus (diocesan)
- Patron saint: Immaculate Conception; Ignatius of Loyola; John of Capistrano
- Secular priests: 145
- Language: Filipino, Native Philippine regional languages, and English

Current leadership
- Pope: Leo XIV
- Ordinary: Oscar Jaime L. Florencio
- Vicar General: Msgr. Gilbert Q. Sones
- Bishops emeritus: Ramón C. Argüelles

Website
- www.militaryordinariateofthephilippines.com
- All current statistics are based from updated data taken by Catholic-Hierarchy.org.

The Military Ordinariate of the Philippines is a Latin Church ecclesiastical jurisdiction or military ordinariate of the Catholic Church in the Philippines serving the Armed Forces of the Philippines, the Philippine National Police, and the Philippine Coast Guard.

It has jurisdiction over all military, police, and coast guard personnel, their dependents, and civilian human resources of all branches of the armed forces. Its titular patron is the Immaculate Conception, with Ignatius of Loyola and John of Capistrano as secondary patrons.

== History ==
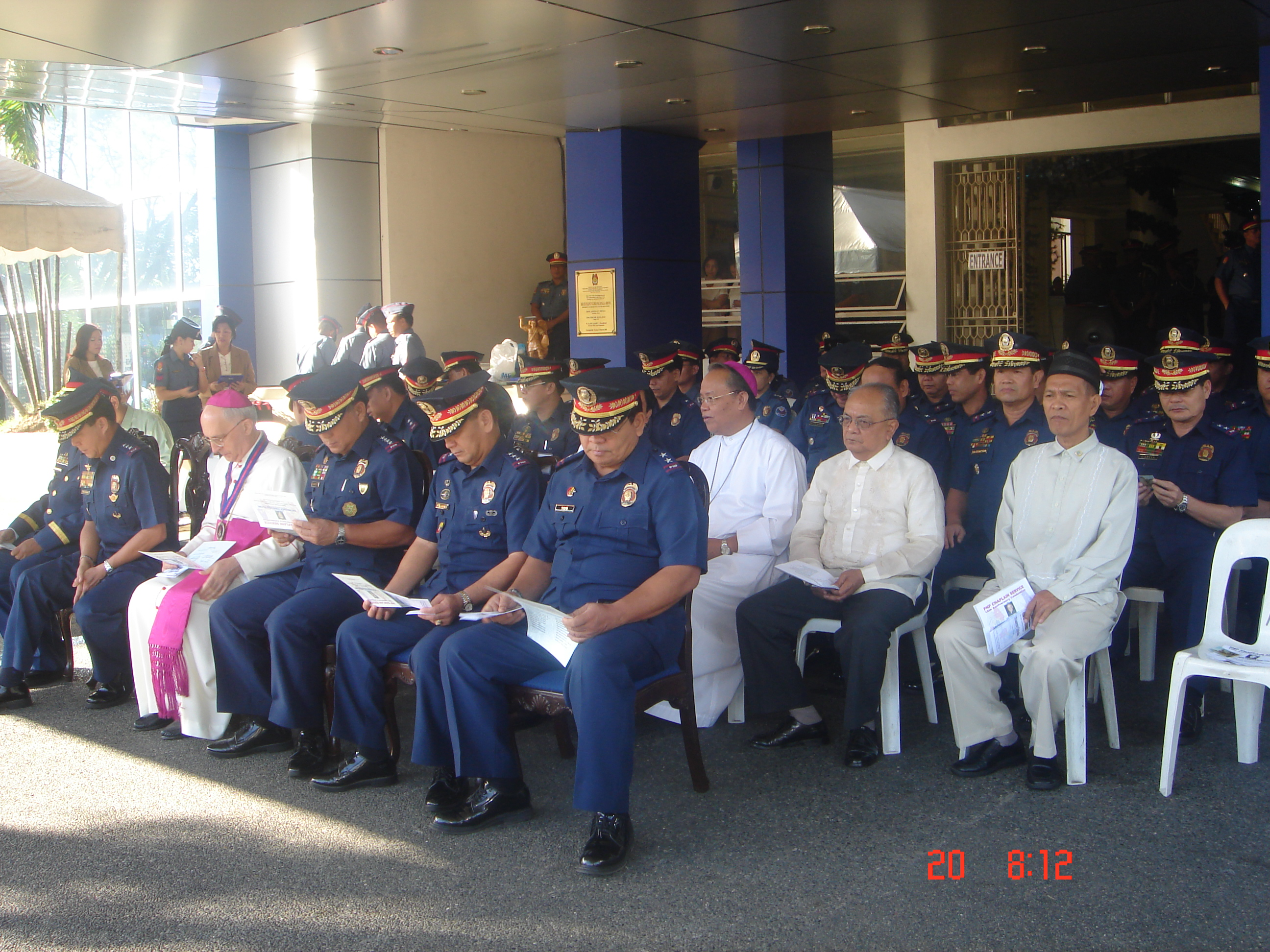
Philippine National Police top brass and then Military Ordinary Leopoldo Tumulak welcomed then Apostolic Nuncio Fernando Filoni (now Grand Master of the Order of the Holy Sepulchre), during his visit to the PNP National Headquarters in 2007.

The Military Ordinariate of the Philippines was initially erected as a military vicariate on December 8, 1950, as per decree by Pope Pius XII via the consistoriat decree Ad consulendum. It was accepted by the Philippine government in a diplomatic agreement, which took effect through the exchange of Notes Verbal in 1952 between then-Foreign Secretary Joaquin Elizalde and then-Apostolic Nuncio Egidio Vagnozzi. Rufino J. Santos, then the Auxiliary Bishop of Manila, took possession of the vicariate and became the first military vicar in Philippine history.

On April 12, 1986, Pope John Paul II promulgated the apostolic constitution Spirituale militum curæ, which took effect on July 21, 1986. This papal document was unique, as it began a new structure for all military vicariates all over the world, elevating these to the level of ordinariates, thus giving them the same status as territorial dioceses.

The ordinariate has its own curia and it exercises its pastoral ministry through chaplains assigned to the different branches of services of Filipino uniformed men and women, including the Bureau of Jail Management and Penology and the Bureau of Fire Protection. The exact number of faithful under said jurisdiction is classified information, but it is approximately 90% of personnel serving the military and police. The mostly-diocesan clergy of the ordinariate carry officers' ranks and are assigned to different command posts nationwide, regardless of service branch.

== Jurisdiction ==
The jurisdiction of the Military Ordinariate is described by the following:

- Personal – The jurisdiction of the military ordinary is personal over all subjects of the military ordinariate. It is exercised independently of geographical territory as a ministry for the faithful determined by personal circumstances.
- Ordinary – That is, attached by law to the office itself.
- Proper – This jurisdiction is exercised by the military ordinary in his own name.
- Cumulative – It is not exclusive. It is exercised within those territories that are subject to local ordinaries and, therefore, it does not preempt their authority nor the authority of the local parish priests. Insofar as the subjects of the military ordinariate are concerned, they are at the same time, in a cumulative manner, subjects of the local ordinary and the pastor of the place where they reside. In permanent military, police, or coastguard installations, camps, bases, forts, and in places reserved for the personnel of these Philippine government's uniformed forces, the jurisdiction is primarily and principally exercised by the military ordinary.

=== Subjects ===
- All Catholic chaplains in active military, police, or coast guard service.
- All civilian Catholic priests, diocesan or religious, who are properly and officially appointed as Volunteer Chaplains in the service of the Military Ordinariate.
- All Catholic laity in active military, police, or coast guard service.
- All Catholic civilian human resources and non-uniformed personnel, their spouses, and children, residing either inside or outside any military, police, or coast guard installation.
- All families of Catholic laity in active military, police, or coast guard service, namely: the spouses, children, servants, and those who habitually live in the same house, whether inside or outside any military, police, or coast guard installation.
- All Catholics living within any military, police, or coast guard installation, or in homes reserved by the government for military, police, or coast guard personnel and their families.
- All Catholics living or working in military hospitals, hospices for the elderly, or similar institutions.
- All Catholics, whether or not members of a religious institute, who permanently carry out a task committed them by the military ordinary or with his consent.

=== Territorial possessions ===
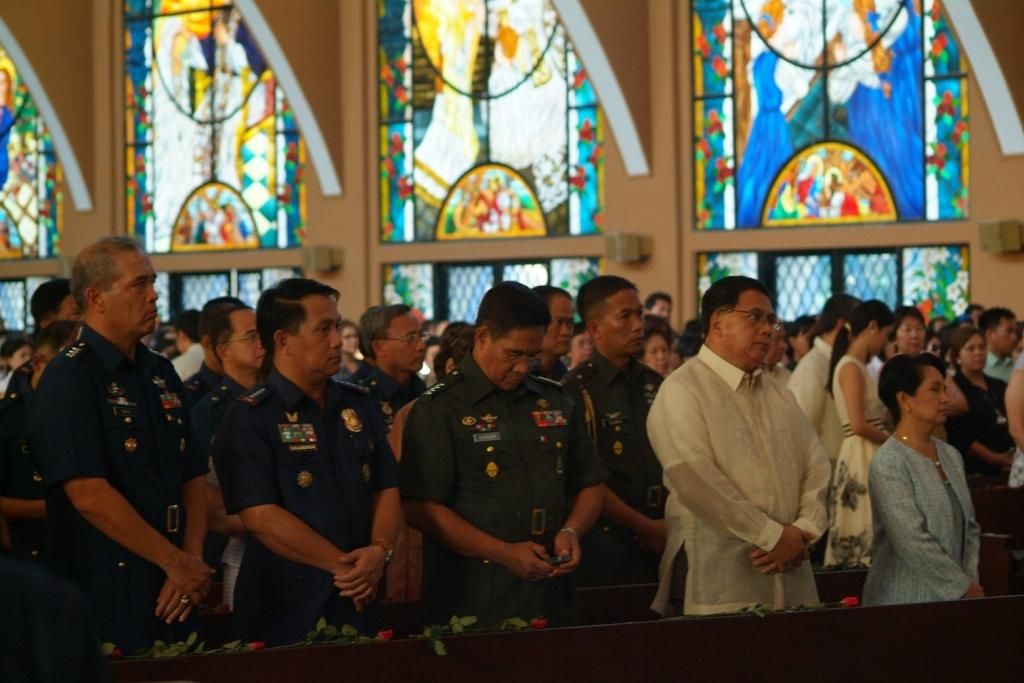
President Gloria Macapagal Arroyo (far right, in powder blue) and the military top brass at the consecration service of the Ordinariate's Shrine of St Thérèse, Doctor of the Church.

Though not bound to any particular geographical area, the military ordinariate has several buildings under its jurisdiction, almost all of which are within military or police instalments. The ordinariate's principal church is the Saint Ignatius Military Cathedral in Camp General Emilio Aguinaldo in Quezon City, while its pro-cathedral for the Police is the Saint Joseph Pro-Cathedral in Camp Rafael Crame (across Camp Aguinaldo on the other side of EDSA).

The ordinariate also runs the Shrine of St. Therese of the Child Jesus, located near Villamor Air Base in Pasay.

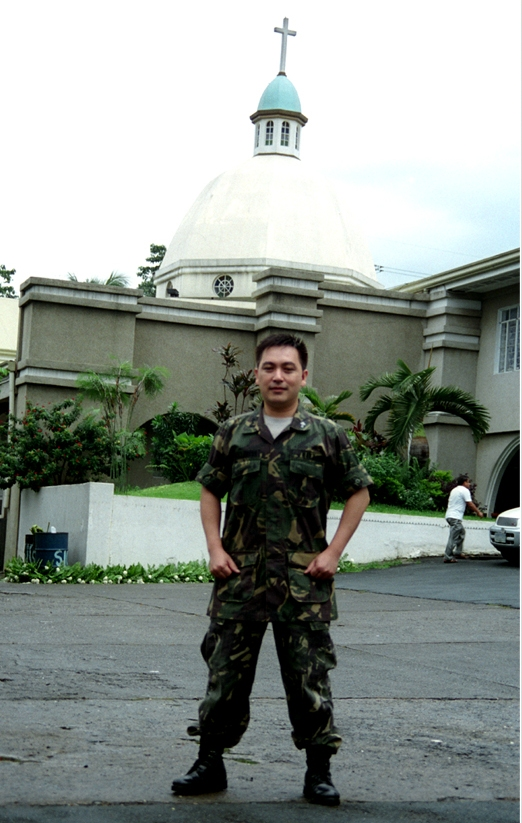
A Chaplain of the Armed Forces standing in front of St Ignatius Military Cathedral.

== Chaplains ==
Priests who wish join the Chaplain Services of the Armed Forces, the National Police, and the Coast Guard are required to fulfil the standard requirements of both the service branch they are entering and the church. The endorsement of the military ordinary is amongst the most important of the ecclesiastical requirements; the ordinary submits the names of applicants for a "call to active duty" (CAD). He gives to chaplains and civilian priests working for the services the canonical faculties to exercise their spiritual ministry among subjects of the military ordinariate.

Chaplains in active duty are given the initial rank of Captain or its equivalent in other branches of the services. They enjoy the prerogatives and privileges of the rest of the officers belonging to the same grade or rank in the service.

Chaplains in active service who are not incardinated into the military ordinariate may be subject to recall by the bishop of their respective diocese of origin, even without cause. On the other hand, the ordinary may also withdraw his endorsement for cause. The chaplain whose endorsement has thus been withdrawn is to report to their diocesan bishop or religious Superior as soon as possible. Chaplains whose tour of active service is terminated are to return to their respective dioceses or religious orders, or as otherwise advised or directed by their original bishop or Superior.

=== Military Ordinary ===
The military ordinary must be a Filipino-born member of the nation's Catholic Church hierarchy, and is appointed by the Holy See after consultation with government. The pope freely nominates the military ordinary– normally a bishop– or institutes or confirms the candidate legitimately chosen according to the canon law. He belongs by right to the Catholic Bishops' Conference of the Philippines and is subject to the Congregation for Bishops.

| Ordinary | | Period in Office | Titular See | Coat of Arms |
|---|---|---|---|---|
| 1. | Rufino J. Santos† (1908–1973) | December 21, 1950 – September 3, 1973 (23 years, 226 days) | Barca | |
| 2. | Mariano G. Gaviola† (1922–1998) | March 2, 1974 – April 13, 1981 (7 years, 42 days) | Girba | |
| 3. | Pedro G. Magugat, M.S.C.† (1925–1990) | December 9, 1981 – April 22, 1985 (3 years, 134 days) | Scilium | |
| 4. | Severino M. Pelayo† (1934–1995) | December 19, 1985 – February 26, 1995 (9 years, 69 days) | Bilta | |
| 5. | Ramón C. Arguelles (1944–) | August 25, 1995 – May 14, 2004 (8 years, 263 days) | Ros Cré | |
| 6. | Leopoldo S. Tumulak† (1944–2017) | January 15, 2005 – June 17, 2017 (12 years, 153 days) | Lesvi | |
| 7. | Oscar Jaime L. Florencio (1966–) | March 2, 2019 – present (7 years, 262 days) | Lestrona | |

== See also ==
- Catholic Church in the Philippines
