= Shrine of St. Therese of the Child Jesus =

Roman Catholic church in Pasay, Philippines

Shrine of Saint Therese of the Child Jesus
- Santuario de Santa Teresa del Niño Jesús (Spanish)
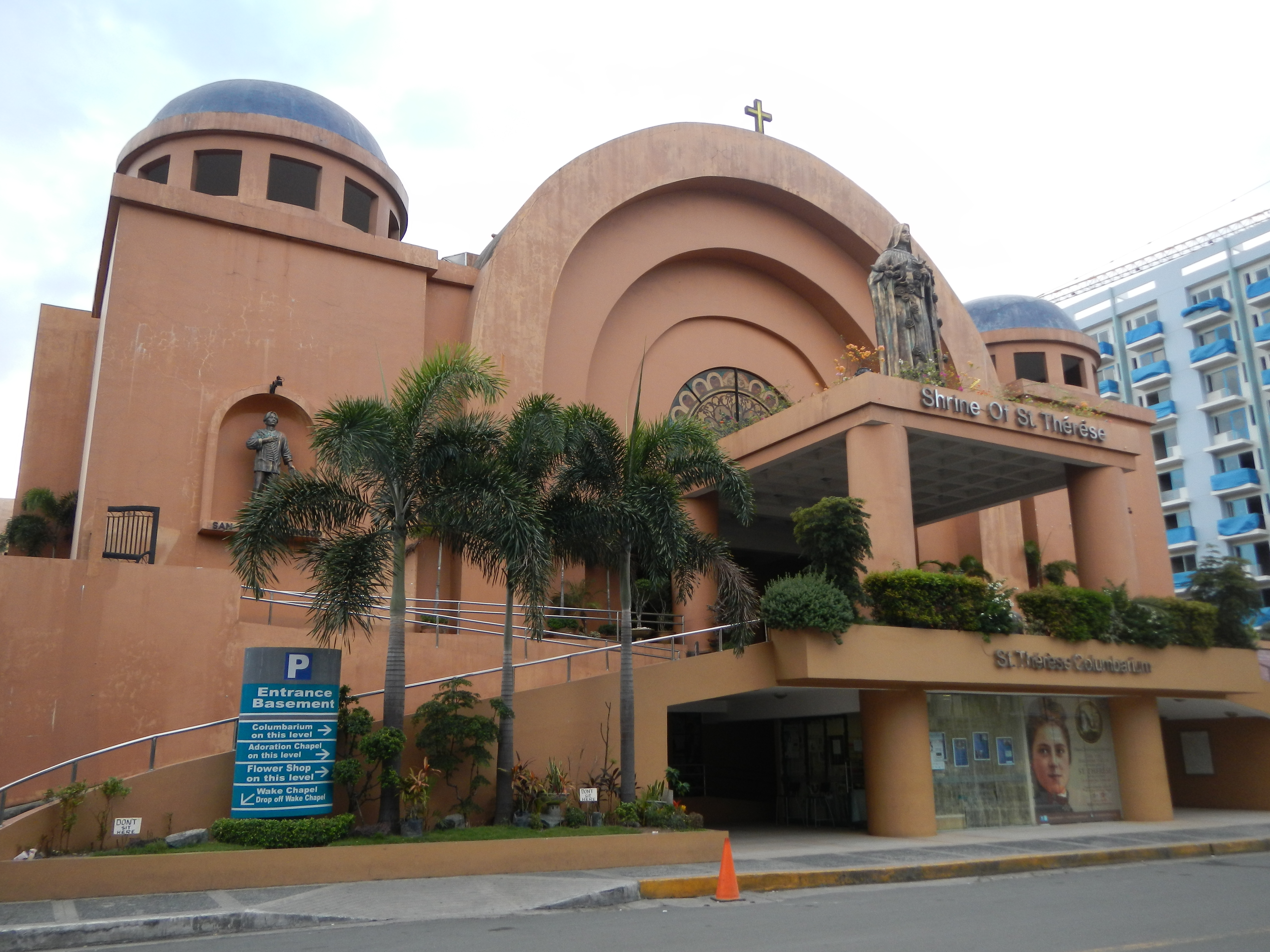
- Church façade in 2013
- Shrine of Saint Therese of the Child Jesus
- 14°31′17″N 121°00′58″E
- Location: Pasay
- Country: Philippines
- Denomination: Roman Catholic

History
- Status: Diocesan shrine
- Founded: c. 1970
- Dedication: Thérèse de Lisieux
- Consecrated: May 17, 2007; 19 years ago

Architecture
- Functional status: Active
- Architectural type: Cruciform church
- Style: Classical Contemporary
- Groundbreaking: 1947; 79 years ago
- Completed: 1983; 43 years ago

Specifications
- Capacity: 1,800
- Length: 84.8 m (278 ft)
- Width: 54.5 m (179 ft)
- Height: 35 m (115 ft)
- Materials: Reinforced concrete

Administration
- Diocese: Military Ordinariate of the Philippines

The Shrine of St. Thérèse of the Child Jesus is a Roman Catholic church located in Pasay, Philippines, across the main entrance of Ninoy Aquino International Airport Terminal 3. Dedicated to Saint Thérèse de Lisieux, the church is classified as a diocesan shrine governed by the Military Ordinariate of the Philippines. It is called a "Center of Devotion" to the saint in the country and in Asia.

== History ==
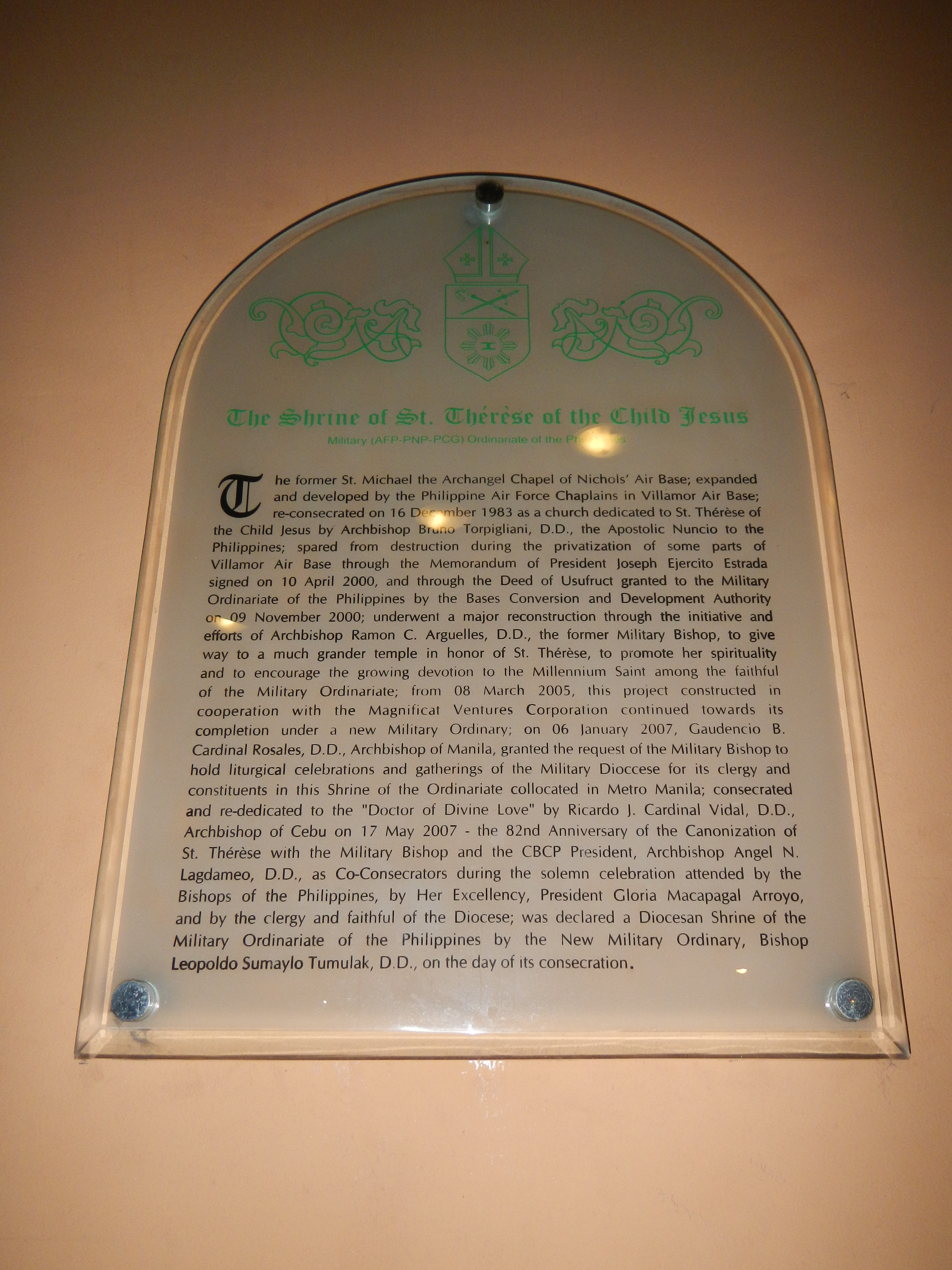
Church historical plaque

The shrine began in 1947 as a makeshift chapel in Nichols Air Base (now Villamor Air Base) constructed by José Alberto, the first military chaplain assigned to the Philippine Air Force. Originally dedicated to Michael the Archangel, it was expanded several times to meet the spiritual needs of the increasing numbers of Philippine Air Force servicemen. After undergoing major renovations in the 1980s, it was consecrated on December 16, 1983, and dedicated to Saint Thérèse of the Child Jesus by Archbishop Bruno Torpigliani, then-Apostolic Nuncio to the Philippines.

The shrine was spared destruction during privatization of some parts of Villamor Air Base under President Joseph Estrada, in a memorandum signed on April 10, 2000, and by the deed of usufruct granted to the Military Ordinariate of the Philippines by the Bases Conversion and Development Authority on November 9, 2000, during the chairmanship of Rogelio L. Singson. After the visit of the pilgrim relics of Thérèse in 2000, the shrine again underwent a major reconstruction initiated by the reigning Ordinary, Archbishop Ramon C. Arguelles, to promote the saint's spirituality and to encourage devotion to the "Millennium Saint" amongst servicemen. From March 8, 2005, this project continued towards its completion under a new ordinary, Leopoldo S. Tumulak.

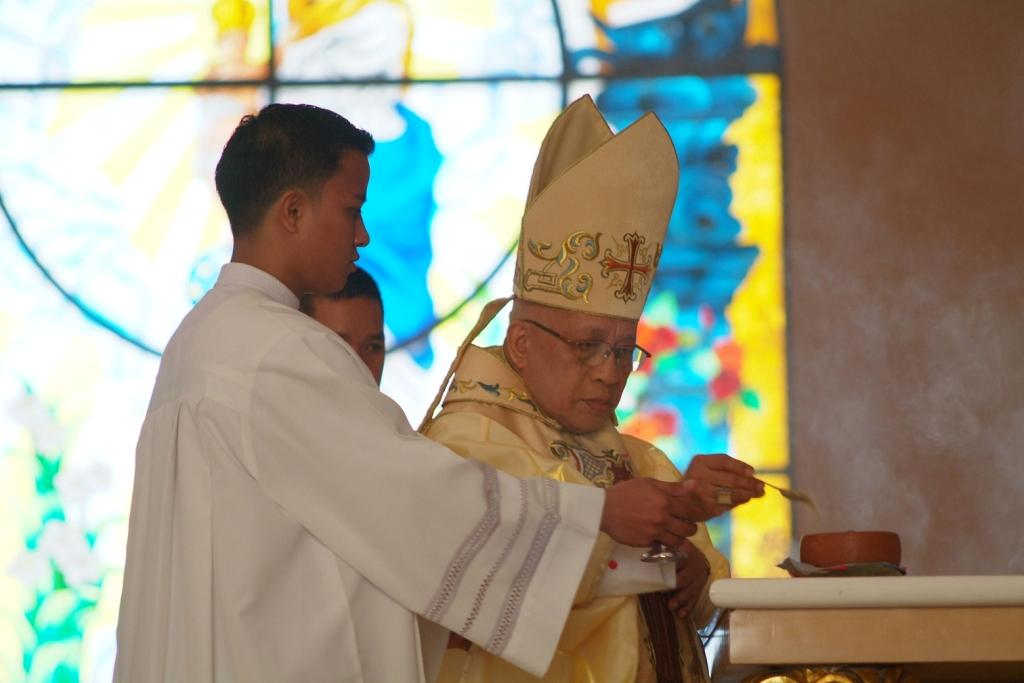
Cardinal Ricardo Vidal consecrating the altar of the Shrine

On January 6, 2007, Cardinal Gaudencio Rosales, Archbishop of Manila, approved the request of Bishop Tumulak to hold liturgical services for the Military Ordinariate in the shrine, which was collocated within the territory of the Archdiocese of Manila. The newly refurbished shrine was consecrated and rededicated to Saint Thérèse on May 17, 2007. The presider at the consecration service was Cardinal Ricardo Vidal, Archbishop of Cebu, while among the other co-celebrating bishops was Catholic Bishops' Conference of the Philippines President, Archbishop Ángel Lagdameo. Also on that day-the 82nd anniversary of the canonisation of Thérèse de Lisieux–the church was declared a diocesan shrine of the Ordinariate by Bishop Tumulak. Present at the service were President Gloria Macapagal Arroyo, who unveiled the historical marker; high officials of the Department of National Defense; and the top brass of the Armed Forces, Police and other uniformed services under the canonical jurisdiction of the Military Ordinariate.

== Gallery ==
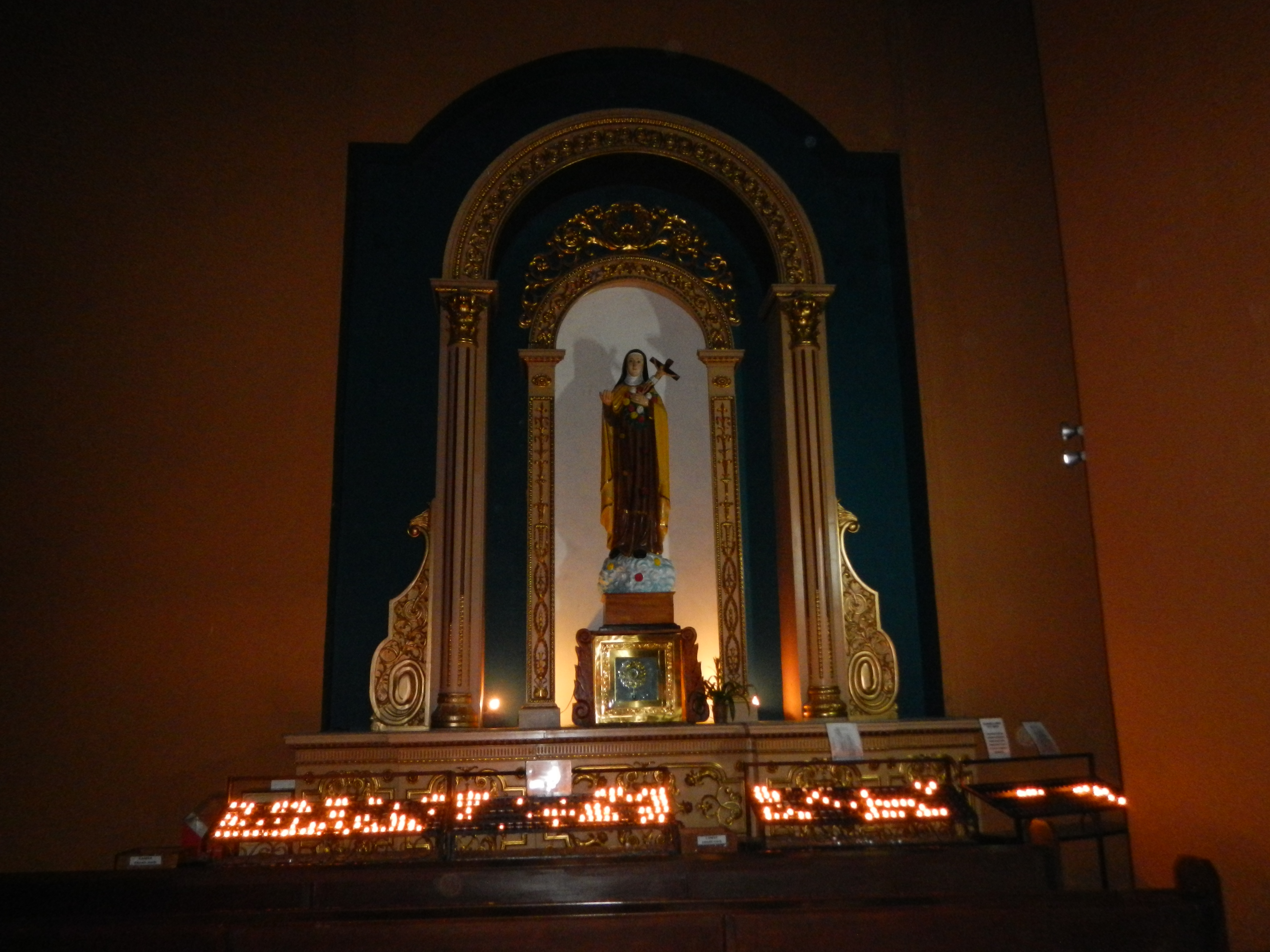
Saint Therese statue

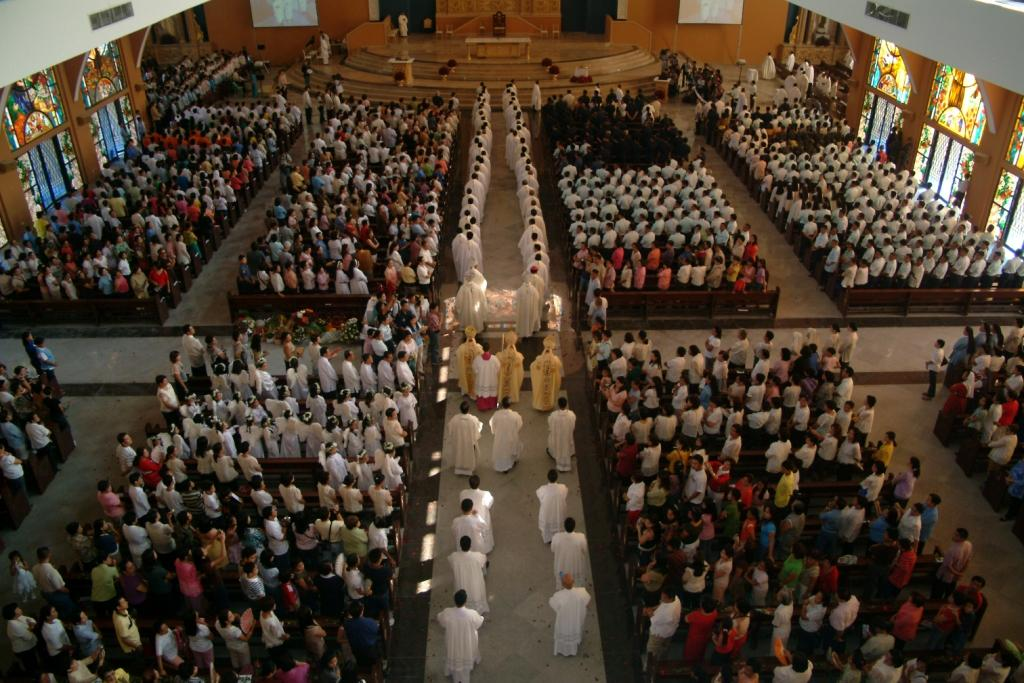
The processional down the Shrine's aisle

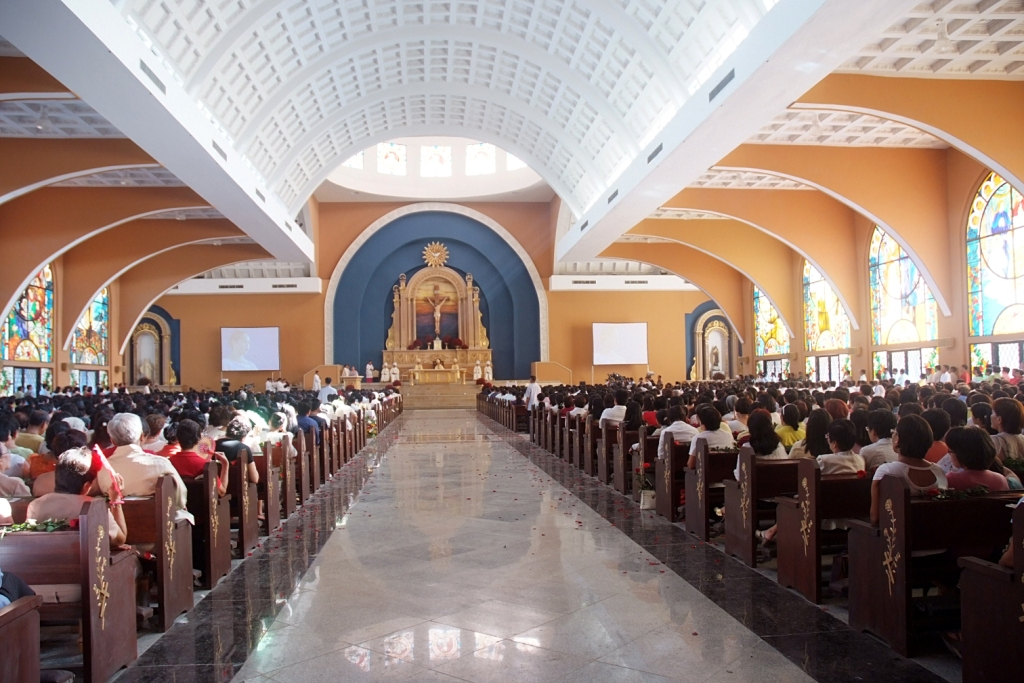
View of the Shrine's nave towards the high altar

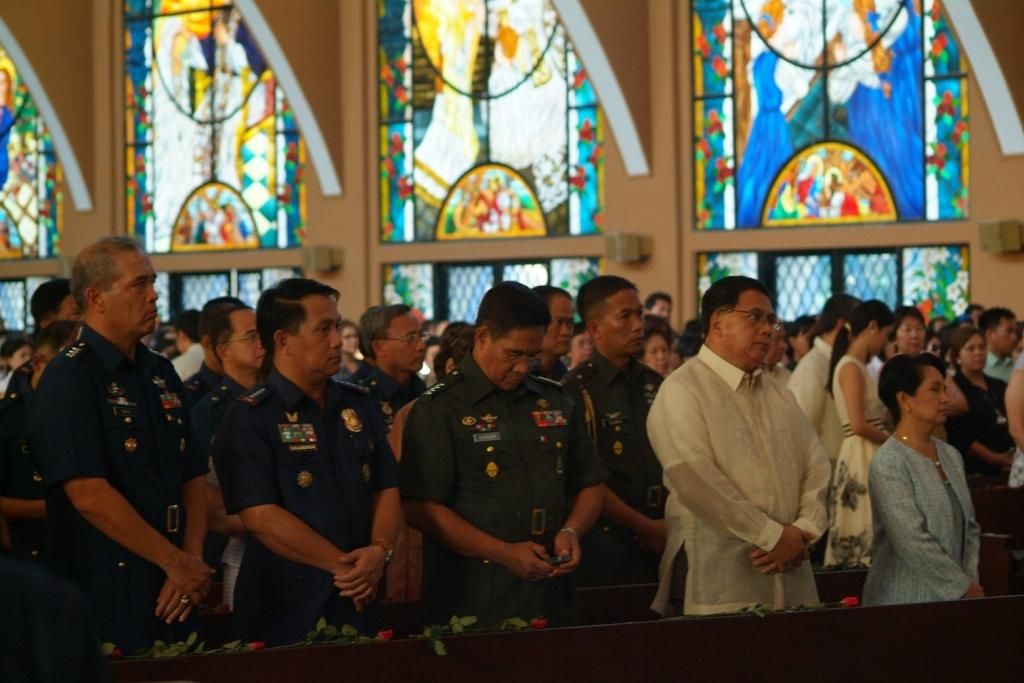
Top civilian and military officials attending the Shrine's inauguration

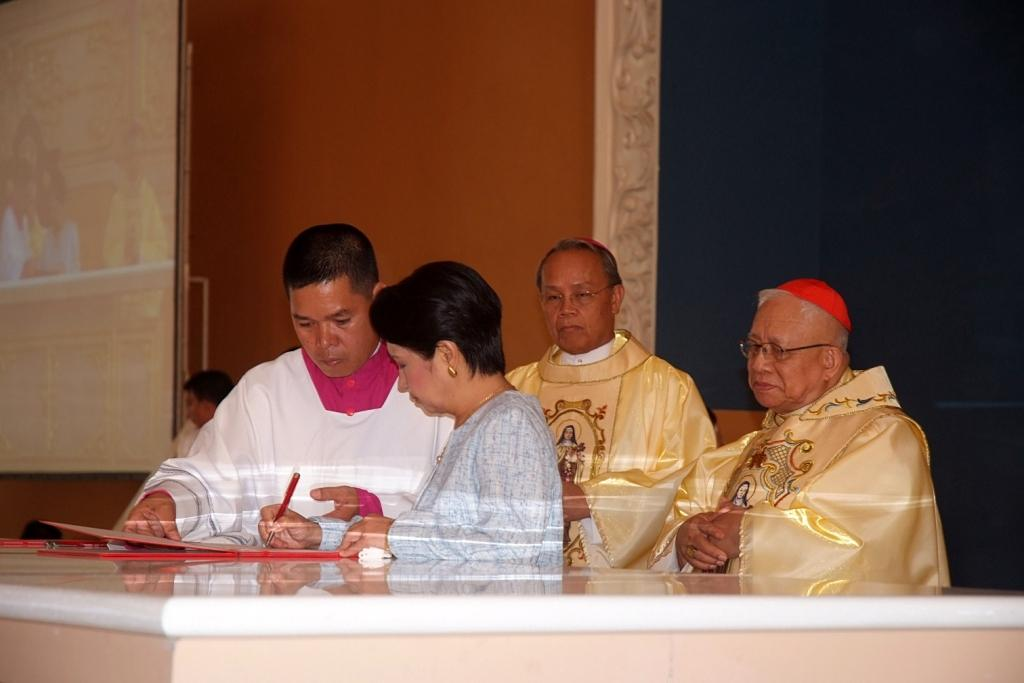
President Macapagal-Arroyo signing a document witnessing the consecration

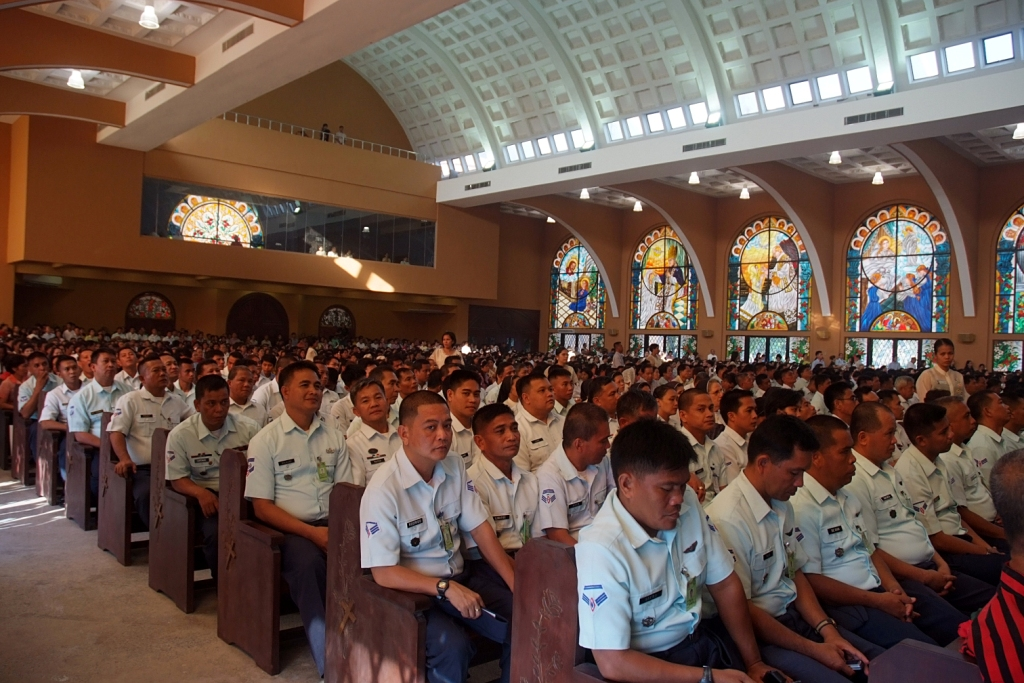
Air Force personnel attending the Shrine's consecration

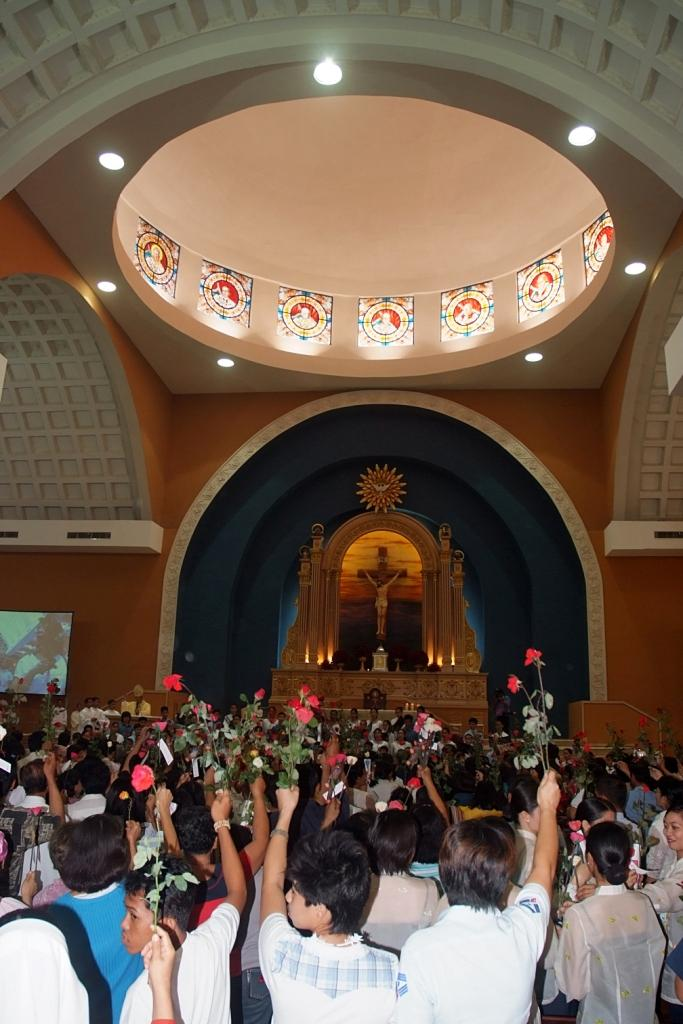
Devotees of St Thérèse hold up roses to be blessed. The flower is symbolic of the saint's intercession.

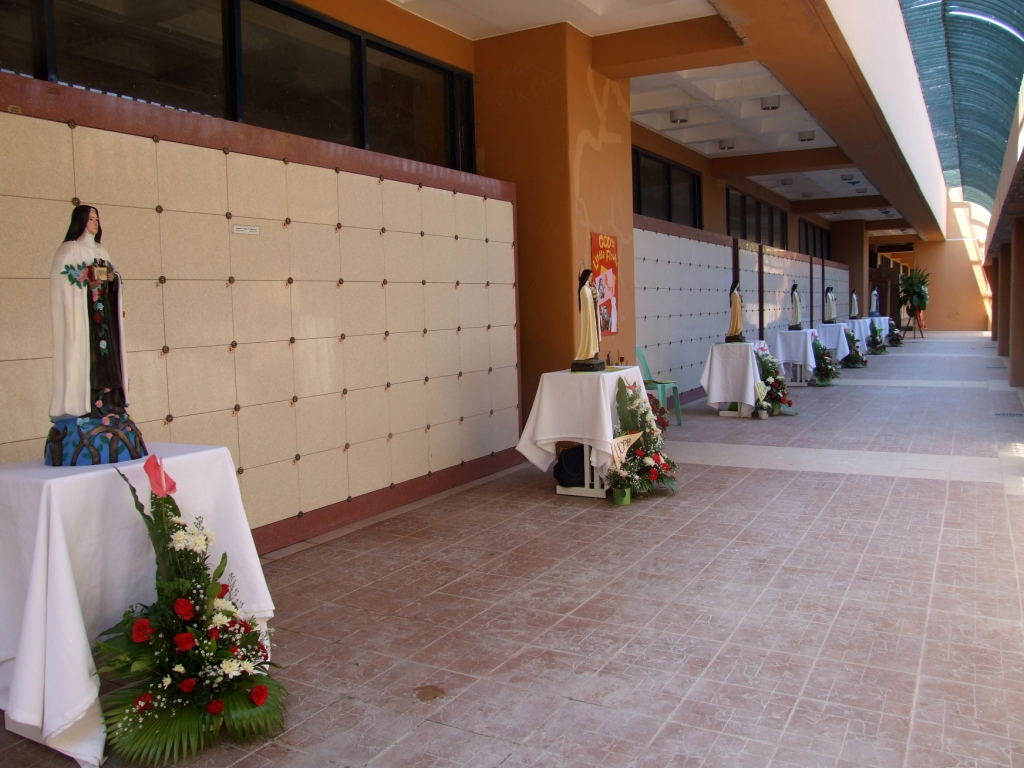
Columbarium located at an outer level of the church, lined with statues of St Thérèse
