= Narciso Bravo Jr. =

Filipino politician

Member of the Philippine House of Representatives from Masbate's 1st District
- In office June 30, 2019 – June 30, 2022
- Preceded by: Maria Vida Espinosa-Bravo
- Succeeded by: Richard Kho
- In office June 30, 2004 – June 30, 2013
- Preceded by: Vida Versoza-Espinosa
- Succeeded by: Maria Vida Espinosa-Bravo

Mayor of San Fernando, Masbate
- In office June 30, 2013 – June 30, 2016
- Preceded by: Maria Vida Espinosa-Bravo
- Succeeded by: Byron Angelo E. Bravo

Member of the Provincial Board of Masbate
- In office June 30, 1995 – June 30, 2004

Personal details
- Born: January 15, 1964 (age 62) Cataingan, Masbate, Philippines
- Party: NUP (2012–present)
- Other political affiliations: Lakas–Kampi (2007–2012); KAMPI (before 2007)
- Spouse: Maria Vida Espinosa-Bravo
- Children: Vincent Martin; Byron Angelo; Ma. Viatriz; Ma. Victoria
- Profession: Civil engineer

Narciso "Bong" Recio Bravo Jr. (born January 15, 1964) is a Filipino politician, who represents the 1st congressional district of the province of Masbate. The district is composed of the municipalities of Batuan, Claveria, Monreal, San Fernando, San Jacinto and San Pascual. He was elected in 2013 as the new mayor of San Fernando, Masbate.

== Early life and education ==
Bong Bravo was born on January 15, 1964, in Cataingan, Masbate. His parents are Narciso G. Bravo, a former RTC judge, and Amparo Recio-Bravo, a teacher. He took up civil engineering at Aquinas University of Legazpi City and graduated in 1986 and passed the PRC licensure examination on the same year.

== Political career ==
Narciso "Bong" Bravo, Jr. is a native of the Province of Masbate in Bicol Region, Philippines. The inevitable course of his political career came in upon the assassination of his father-in-law, the late Rep. Tito R. Espinosa in 1995. He was elected as one of the Provincial Board Members in 1995 and finished the term in 2004. In 2004, upon completion of her mother-in-law, Rep. Vida Espinosa's term in Congress, he took over and completed the three-term stint in 2013. Thereafter, he was elected Municipal Mayor of San Fernando in Ticao Island from 2013 to 2016. He regained his congressional seat in 2019 for his 4th term, and while on this spot, he was also elected by the lower house as the Chair of the Committee on Public Order and Safety, which is one of the most powerful committees of the House of Representatives as this ensures safety and security of the nation, as a whole.

=== Congress ===
While serving in the lower chamber Bravo served different committee membership including the vice-chair of the powerful committee on appropriations. He is a member and the current Secretary General of the National Unity Party (NUP).

- July 30, 2019 - elected CHAIR of the Committee on Public Order and Safety, House of Representatives
- July 3, 2020 - Sponsored the enacted Republic Act 11479, otherwise known as "The Anti- Terrorism Act of 2020"
- Sponsored, co-authored RA 11549, otherwise known as "An Act Lowering the Minimum Height Requirement for the Applicants of the Philippine National Police (PNP), Bureau of Fire Protection (BFP), Bureau of Jail Management and Penology (BJMP), and Bureau of Corrections (BUCOR), was signed May 26, 2021
- To date :

-- Two (2) Legislative measures enacted into law—acted on sixty five (65) House Bills—drafted nine (9) Substitute Bills—prepared ten (10) Committee Reports of which four (4) were filed

== Personal life ==
He is married to Maria Vida Espinosa who is the daughter of two former representatives (Tito Espinosa and Vida Versoza-Espinosa). They have 4 children.
