= Ticao =

Ticao can refer to:

- Ticao Island, Masbate province, Philippines
- Ticao Pass, the strait that separates Ticao Island from the Bicol Peninsula in the Philippines
- Carlos Augusto Bertoldi, known as Ticão, a Brazilian footballer
