= Bongsanglay Natural Park =

Protected area in the Philippines

- Bongsalay Natural Park
- IUCN category III (natural monument or feature)
- Location within Philippines
- Location: Masbate, Philippines
- Nearest city: Masbate City
- Coordinates: 12°23′9″N 123°46′58″E
- Area: 244.72 hectares (604.7 acres)
- Established: December 29, 1981 (Forest reserve); May 31, 2000 (Natural park)
- Governing body: Department of Environment and Natural Resources

Bongsanglay Natural Park (also spelled Bongsalay and Bujong Sanglay) is a protected area of mangrove forests and swamps on Ticao Island in the Bicol Region of the Philippines. It is located in the municipality of Batuan in the island province of Masbate covering an area of 244.72 hectares (604.7 acres). The protected area was established on 29 December 1981 when the area "from Panciscan Point in Bitos Bay up to Bano Sanlay" in Batuan was declared a Mangrove Swamp Forest Reserve under Proclamation No. 2152 signed by President Ferdinand Marcos. In 2000, when President Joseph Estrada signed Proclamation No. 319, Bongsanglay was reclassified as a natural park pursuant to the National Integrated Protected Areas System (NIPAS) Act.

== Description ==
Bongsanglay Natural Park is the only remaining primary growth mangrove forest in the Bicol Region as all the other regional mangroves have been replanted. It is located in the barangay of Royroy near the southern tip of Ticao Island by the Biton Bay facing the Ticao Pass and Samar Sea marine corridor. A small fishing community can be found not far from the mangroves. There is also a 1,000-meter canopy walk that traverses the park for patrolling and for ecotourism purposes.

== Wildlife ==
The park hosts 36 species of mangroves dominated by the Rhizophora spp. and which also include Avicennia species of which the oldest is more than 125 years old. It also supports 68 avifauna species, including mangrove heron, Pacific reef heron, little egret, wandering whistling duck, white-collared kingfisher, Pacific swallow, common emerald dove, zebra dove, amethyst brown dove, common cuckoo, river kingfisher, pied triller, grey wagtail, grey-tailed tattler and the endemic Philippine duck. In addition, 3 species of amphibians and 11 species of reptiles have also been observed in the park.

== See also ==
- List of natural parks of the Philippines
