= Masbate's 1st congressional district =

Legislative district of the Philippines

- Constituency for the House of Representatives of the Philippines
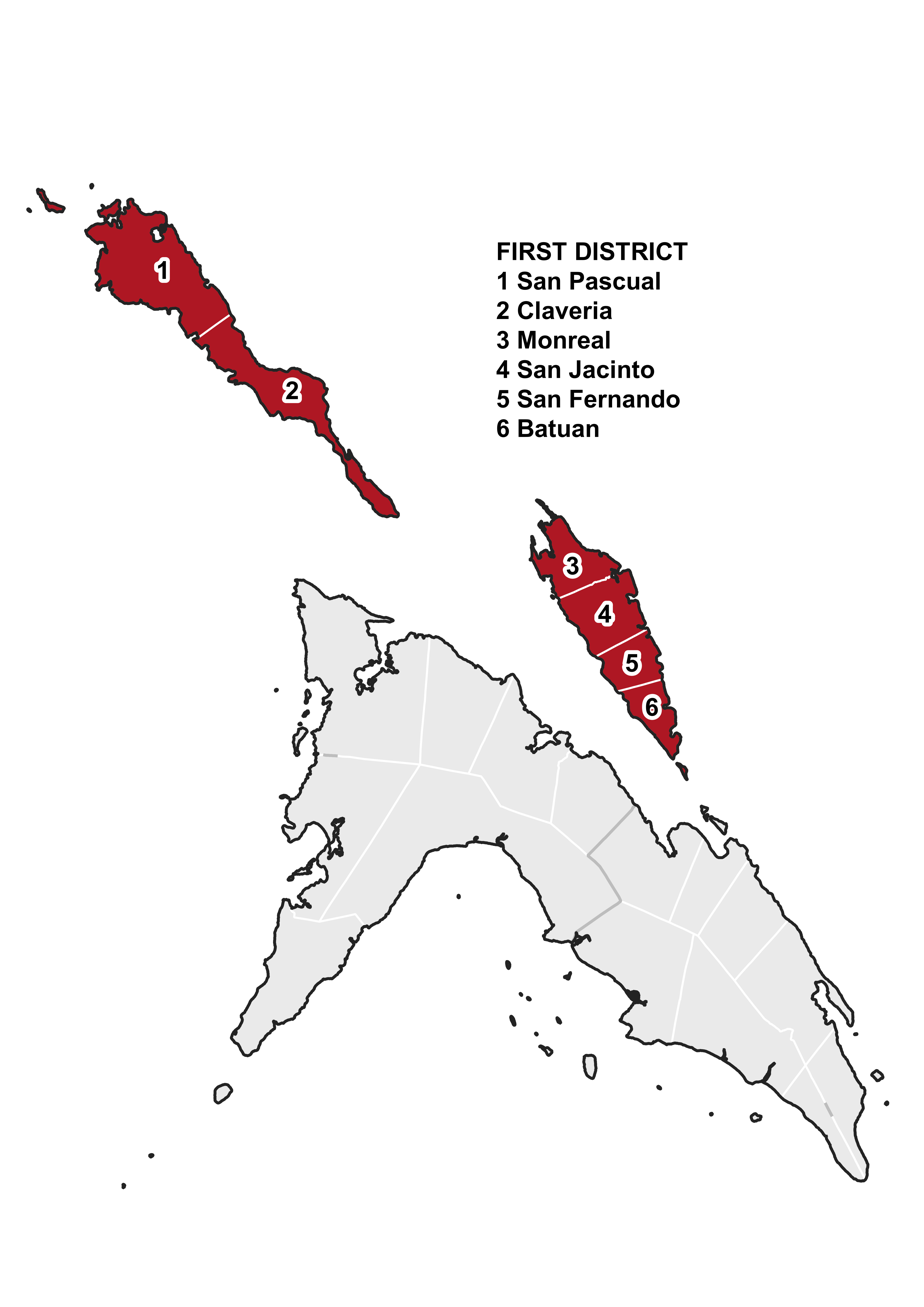

- Location of Masbate within the Philippines
- Province: Masbate
- Region: Bicol Region
- Population: 177,651 (2020)
- Electorate: 122,539 (2022)
- Major settlements: 6 LGUs: Municipalities; Batuan; Claveria; Monreal; San Fernando; San Jacinto; San Pascual
- Area: 814.48 km^{2} (314.47 sq mi)

Current constituency
- Created: 1987
- Representative: Antonio T. Kho
- Political party: Lakas
- Congressional bloc: Majority

Masbate's 1st congressional district is one of the three congressional districts of the Philippines in the province of Masbate. It has been represented in the House of Representatives since 1987. The district consists of six municipalities in the Burias and Ticao islands of northern Masbate, namely: Claveria and San Pascual in Burias island and Batuan, Monreal, San Fernando and San Jacinto in Ticao island. It is currently represented in the 20th Congress by Antonio T. Kho of the Lakas–CMD.

== Representation history ==
#	Image	Member	Term of office		Congress	Party	Electoral history	Constituent LGUs
#	Image	Member	Start	End	Congress	Party	Electoral history	Constituent LGUs
=== Masbate's 1st district for the House of Representatives of the Philippines ===
District created February 2, 1987.
1		Tito Espinosa	June 30, 1987	February 28, 1995	8th	Independent	Elected in 1987.	1987–present Batuan, Claveria, Monreal, San Fernando, San Jacinto, San Pascual
1		Tito Espinosa	June 30, 1987	February 28, 1995	9th	Lakas	Re-elected in 1992. Died in office.	1987–present Batuan, Claveria, Monreal, San Fernando, San Jacinto, San Pascual
2		Vida Verzosa Espinosa	June 30, 1995	June 30, 2004	10th	Lakas	Elected in 1995.	1987–present Batuan, Claveria, Monreal, San Fernando, San Jacinto, San Pascual
2		Vida Verzosa Espinosa	June 30, 1995	June 30, 2004	11th	Lakas	Re-elected in 1998.	1987–present Batuan, Claveria, Monreal, San Fernando, San Jacinto, San Pascual
2		Vida Verzosa Espinosa	June 30, 1995	June 30, 2004	12th	Lakas	Re-elected in 2001.	1987–present Batuan, Claveria, Monreal, San Fernando, San Jacinto, San Pascual
3		Narciso Bravo Jr.	June 30, 2004	June 30, 2013	13th	KAMPI	Elected in 2004.	1987–present Batuan, Claveria, Monreal, San Fernando, San Jacinto, San Pascual
3		Narciso Bravo Jr.	June 30, 2004	June 30, 2013	14th	Lakas	Re-elected in 2007.	1987–present Batuan, Claveria, Monreal, San Fernando, San Jacinto, San Pascual
3		Narciso Bravo Jr.	June 30, 2004	June 30, 2013	15th	NUP	Re-elected in 2010.	1987–present Batuan, Claveria, Monreal, San Fernando, San Jacinto, San Pascual
4		Ma. Vida Espinosa Bravo	June 30, 2013	June 30, 2019	16th	NUP	Elected in 2013.	1987–present Batuan, Claveria, Monreal, San Fernando, San Jacinto, San Pascual
4		Ma. Vida Espinosa Bravo	June 30, 2013	June 30, 2019	17th	NUP	Re-elected in 2016.	1987–present Batuan, Claveria, Monreal, San Fernando, San Jacinto, San Pascual
(3)		Narciso Bravo Jr.	June 30, 2019	June 30, 2022	18th	NUP	Elected in 2019.	1987–present Batuan, Claveria, Monreal, San Fernando, San Jacinto, San Pascual
5		Ricardo T. Kho	June 30, 2022	June 30, 2025	19th	PDP–Laban	Elected in 2022.	1987–present Batuan, Claveria, Monreal, San Fernando, San Jacinto, San Pascual
5		Ricardo T. Kho	June 30, 2022	June 30, 2025	19th	Lakas	Elected in 2022.	1987–present Batuan, Claveria, Monreal, San Fernando, San Jacinto, San Pascual
6		Antonio T. Kho	June 30, 2025	Present	20th	Lakas	Elected in 2025.	1987–present Batuan, Claveria, Monreal, San Fernando, San Jacinto, San Pascual

== Election results ==
=== 2025 ===
Candidate	Party	Votes	%
Antonio Kho	Lakas–CMD	70,214	100.00
Total		70,214	100.00
Valid votes		70,214	67.04
Invalid/blank votes		34,518	32.96
Total votes		104,732	100.00
Registered voters/turnout		128,429	81.55
Lakas–CMD hold			
Source: Commission on Elections

=== 2022 ===
Candidate	Party	Votes	%
Richard Kho	PDP–Laban	57,770	59.34
Marvi Bravo	National Unity Party	39,591	40.66
Total		97,361	100.00
Total votes		105,702	–
Registered voters/turnout		122,539	86.26
PDP–Laban gain from National Unity Party			
Source: Commission on Elections

=== 2016 ===
2016 Philippine House of Representatives elections
Party	Candidate	Votes	%
NUP	Ma. Vida Espinosa-Bravo	46,026	
Nacionalista	Ciceron Altarejos	12,947	
Invalid or blank votes		20,279	
Total votes		79,252	
NUP hold			

=== 2013 ===
2013 Philippine House of Representatives elections
Party	Candidate	Votes	%
NUP	Maria Vida Bravo	27,201	53.50
Liberal	Ricardo Butalid, Jr.	16,823	33.09
Margin of victory		10,378	20.41%
Invalid or blank votes		6,820	13.41
Total votes		50,844	100.00
NUP hold			

=== 2010 ===
Candidate	Party	Votes	%
Narciso Bravo Jr. (incumbent)	Lakas–Kampi–CMD	44,732	60.45
Karla Bunan	Pwersa ng Masang Pilipino	29,266	39.55
Total		73,998	100.00
Valid votes		73,998	95.14
Invalid/blank votes		3,778	4.86
Total votes		77,776	100.00
Lakas–Kampi–CMD hold			
Source: Commission on Elections

== See also ==
- Legislative districts of Masbate
