= Monreal Stones =

Archaeological artifact from the Philippines

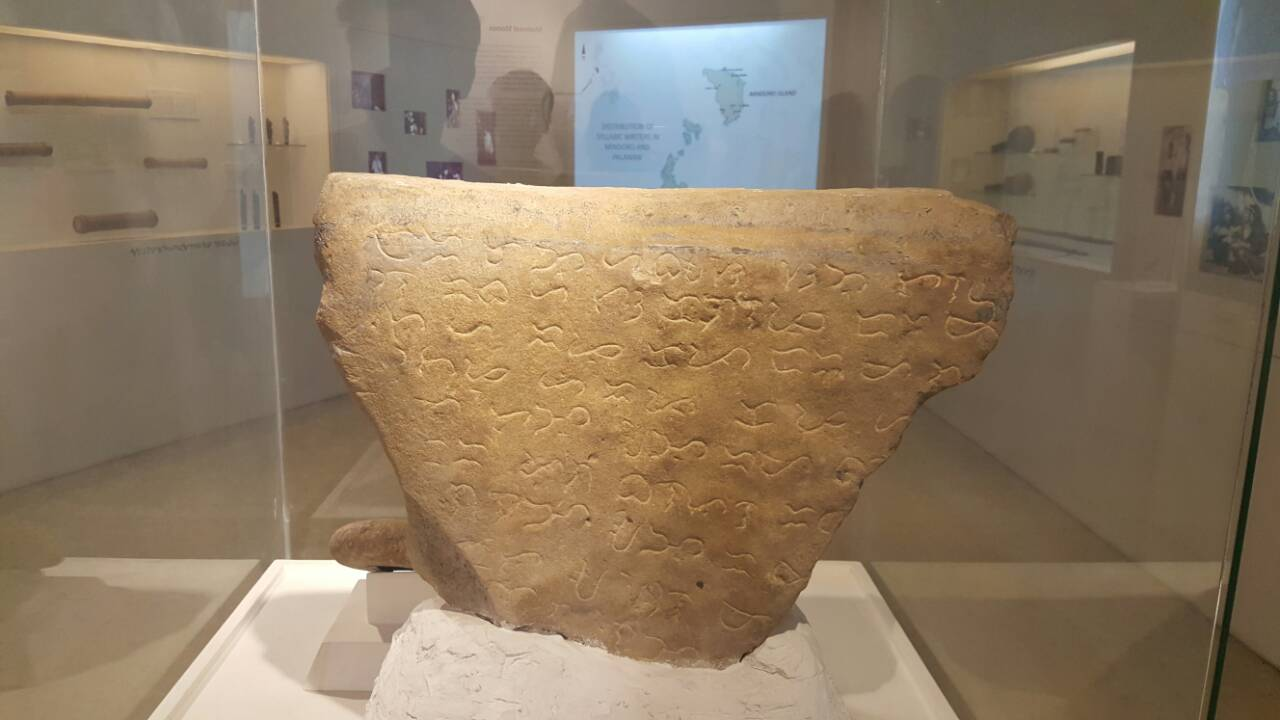
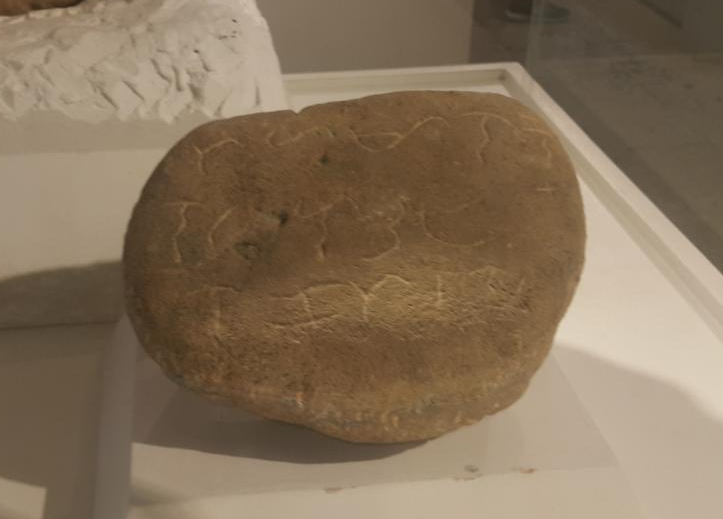
- The Monreal Stones displayed at the Baybayin section of the National Museum of Anthropology
- Material: limestone
- Created: 17th century CE (inscriptions)
- Discovered: 15 March 2011; Monreal, Ticao Island, Masbate, Philippines
- Discovered by: Virgie Almodal
- Present location: National Museum of the Philippines
- Culture: Filipino

The Monreal Stones (Filipino: Mga Batong Monreal), also referred to as the Ticao stones, are two limestone tablets that contain Badlit (Surat Bisaya/Sulat Bisaya) characters, Epigraphic analysis indicates that the language carved on the Monreal Stones is an archaic form of the Visayan language.

Found by pupils of Rizal Elementary School on Ticao Island in Monreal, Masbate, who had scraped the mud off their shoes and slippers on an irregular-shaped limestone tablet before entering their classroom, these are now housed in a section of the National Museum of Anthropology. The large, triangular stone weighs 30 kg (66 lb), is 11 cm (4.3 in) thick, 54 cm (21 in) long and 44 cm (17 in) wide. The smaller stone is oval-shaped and is 6 cm (2.4 in) thick, 20 cm (7.9 in) long and 18 cm (7.1 in) wide. The National Museum held a Baybayin conference to present the Monreal Stones to the public on 13 December 2013.

The dating and authenticity of the stones are still under discussion, however initial examination has revealed that the inscriptions could not have been made earlier than the 17th century due to the usage of the Baybayin vowel deleter introduced in 1621 by the Spanish friars.

== See also ==
- Laguna Copperplate Inscription
- Butuan Ivory Seal
- Suyat
- History of the Philippines (900-1521)
- Archaeology of the Philippines
