= San Fernando, Masbate =

Municipality in Masbate, Philippines

San Fernando Tabunan
- Municipality
- Municipality of San Fernando
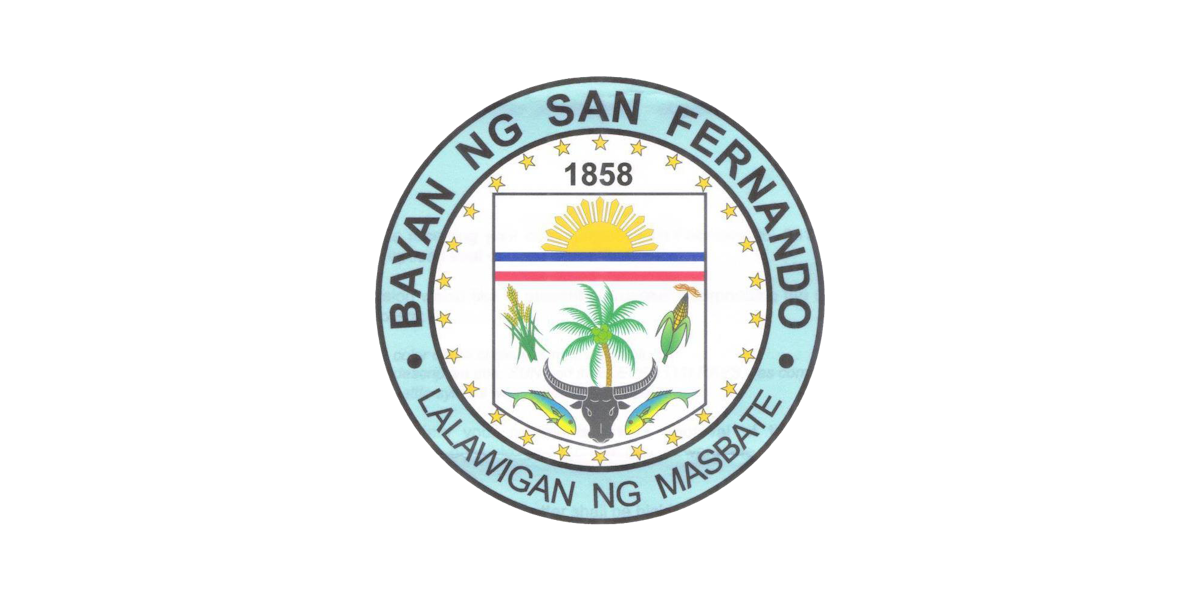
- Flag

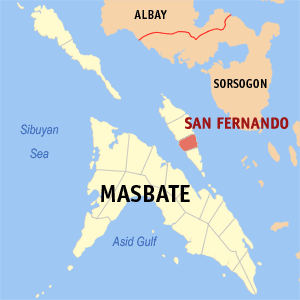
- Map of Masbate with San Fernando highlighted
- Interactive map of San Fernando
- Location within the Philippines
- Coordinates: 12°29′09″N 123°45′46″E
- Country: Philippines
- Region: Bicol Region
- Province: Masbate
- District: 1st district
- Barangays: 26 (see Barangays)

Government
  - Type: Sangguniang Bayan
  - Mayor: Maria Vida E. Bravo
  - Vice Mayor: Fernando V. Moguies
  - Representative: Narciso R. Bravo Jr.
  - Municipal Council: Members: Piedad B. Capariño; Alistair Edward A. Lozano; Rex M. Clemente; Loneto N. Centura; Rene C. Alindogan; Romeo L. Espejon; Belinda C. Abapo; Victor V. Mogueis
  - Electorate: 16,767 voters (2025)

Area
  - Total: 77.50 km^{2} (29.92 sq mi)
- Elevation: 36 m (118 ft)
- Highest elevation: 256 m (840 ft)
- Lowest elevation: 0 m (0 ft)

Population (2024 census)
  - Total: 22,006
  - Density: 283.9/km^{2} (735.4/sq mi)
  - Households: 5,521

Economy
  - Income class: 4th municipal income class
  - Poverty incidence: 16.9% (2023)
  - Revenue: ₱ 126.1 million (2024)
  - Assets: ₱ 574.5 million (2024)
  - Expenditure: ₱ 115 million (2024)
  - Liabilities: ₱ 58.18 million (2024)

Service provider
  - Electricity: Ticao Island Electric Cooperative (TISELCO)
- Time zone: UTC+8 (PST)
- ZIP code: 5416
- PSGC: 0504118000
- IDD : area code: +63 (0)56
- Native languages: Masbateño; Tagalog
- Website: www.sanfernando-masbate.gov.ph

San Fernando, officially the Municipality of San Fernando, is a municipality in the province of Masbate, Philippines. According to the 2024 census, it has a population of 22,006 people.

It is located on Ticao Island. The economy of the town is based on fishing, farming, and other trades.

== History ==
In 1951, the barrios of Batuan, Burgos, Gibraltar, Costa Rica, Panisihan, and Matabao were separated from San Fernando to form the town of Batuan.

== Geography ==
=== Barangays ===
San Fernando is politically subdivided into 26 barangays. Each barangay consists of puroks and some have sitios.

- Altavista
- Benitinan
- Buenasuerte
- Buenavista
- Buenos Aires
- Buyo
- Cañelas
- Corbada
- Daplian
- Del Rosario
- Ipil
- Lahong
- Lumbia
- Magkaipit
- Minio
- Pinamoghaan
- Poblacion (District 1) Baybaydagat
- Poblacion (District 2) Silangan
- Poblacion (District 3) Magsasaka
- Poblacion (District 4) Bayanihan
- Progreso
- Resurreccion/Looc
- Salvacion
- Sowa
- Talisay
- Valparaiso

=== Climate ===
Climate data for San Fernando, Masbate
Month	Jan	Feb	Mar	Apr	May	Jun	Jul	Aug	Sep	Oct	Nov	Dec	Year
Mean daily maximum °C (°F)	29 (84)	29 (84)	31 (88)	32 (90)	32 (90)	31 (88)	30 (86)	30 (86)	30 (86)	30 (86)	29 (84)	29 (84)	30 (86)
Mean daily minimum °C (°F)	23 (73)	22 (72)	23 (73)	23 (73)	25 (77)	25 (77)	24 (75)	25 (77)	24 (75)	24 (75)	24 (75)	23 (73)	24 (75)
Average precipitation mm (inches)	39 (1.5)	34 (1.3)	42 (1.7)	36 (1.4)	73 (2.9)	109 (4.3)	118 (4.6)	108 (4.3)	129 (5.1)	136 (5.4)	112 (4.4)	89 (3.5)	1,025 (40.4)
Average rainy days	12.6	9.7	12.0	13.0	20.5	25.3	26.2	24.8	25.2	25.9	21.9	17.9	235
Source: Meteoblue

== Demographics ==
Population census of San Fernando

Year	Pop.	±% p.a.
1903	5,338	—
1918	7,862	+2.61%
1939	14,663	+3.01%
1948	17,417	+1.93%
1960	13,221	−2.27%
1970	17,494	+2.84%
1975	18,041	+0.62%
1980	18,766	+0.79%

Year	Pop.	±% p.a.
1990	16,904	−1.04%
1995	18,722	+1.93%
2000	19,179	+0.52%
2007	19,565	+0.28%
2010	21,309	+3.16%
2015	23,057	+1.51%
2020	21,600	−1.36%
2024	22,006	+0.45%

Source: Philippine Statistics Authority

In the 2024 census, the population of San Fernando was 22,006 people, with a density of 280 inhabitants per square kilometre or 730 inhabitants per square mile.

== Economy ==
Poverty incidence of San Fernando (%)

Source: Philippine Statistics Authority

== Archaeological and Ecological Landscape and Seascape of Ticao ==
The municipality is part of Ticao Island, which is known as an archaeological landscape, possessing thousands of pre-colonial artifacts such as the Baybayin-inscribed Rizal Stone, Ticao gold spike teeth, Burial jars of varying designs and sizes, jade beads, human face rock statues, and the Ticao petrographs. Much of the homes in Ticao Island use these archaeological finds to design their interiors. The island is also an ecological frontier for the conservation of manta rays. The island also possesses a 'rare subspecies' of Visayan warty pig, that is almost near extinction.

== Education ==
The San Fernando Schools District Office governs all educational institutions within the municipality. It oversees the management and operations of all private and public, from primary to secondary schools.

=== Primary and elementary schools ===
- Altavista Elementary School
- Benitinan Elementary School
- Blue Angel Learning Center
- Buenasuerte Elementary School
- Buenos Aires Elementary School
- Buyo Elementary School
- Cabug Elementary School
- Canelas Elementary School
- Corbada Elementary School
- Daplian Elementary School
- Ipil Elementary School
- Lahong Elementary School
- Lumbia Primary School
- Magkaipit Elementary School
- Minio Elementary School
- P. Basas Elementary School
- Progreso Elementary School
- Resurrecion Elementary School
- Salvacion Elementary School
- San Fernando Central School
- San Fernando East Elementary School
- Sowa Elementary School
- Talisay Elementary School
- Valparaiso Elementary School

=== Secondary schools ===
- Andres Clemente Jr. National High School
- Buenavista Integrated School
- Buyo National High School
- Ipil National High School
