= Claveria =

Claveria is the name of three municipalities in the Philippines named after Narciso Clavería, the Spanish Governor-General of the country from 1844 to 1849.

- Claveria, Cagayan
- Claveria, Masbate
- Claveria, Misamis Oriental
