= Kalbario–Patapat Natural Park =

- IUCN category II (national park)
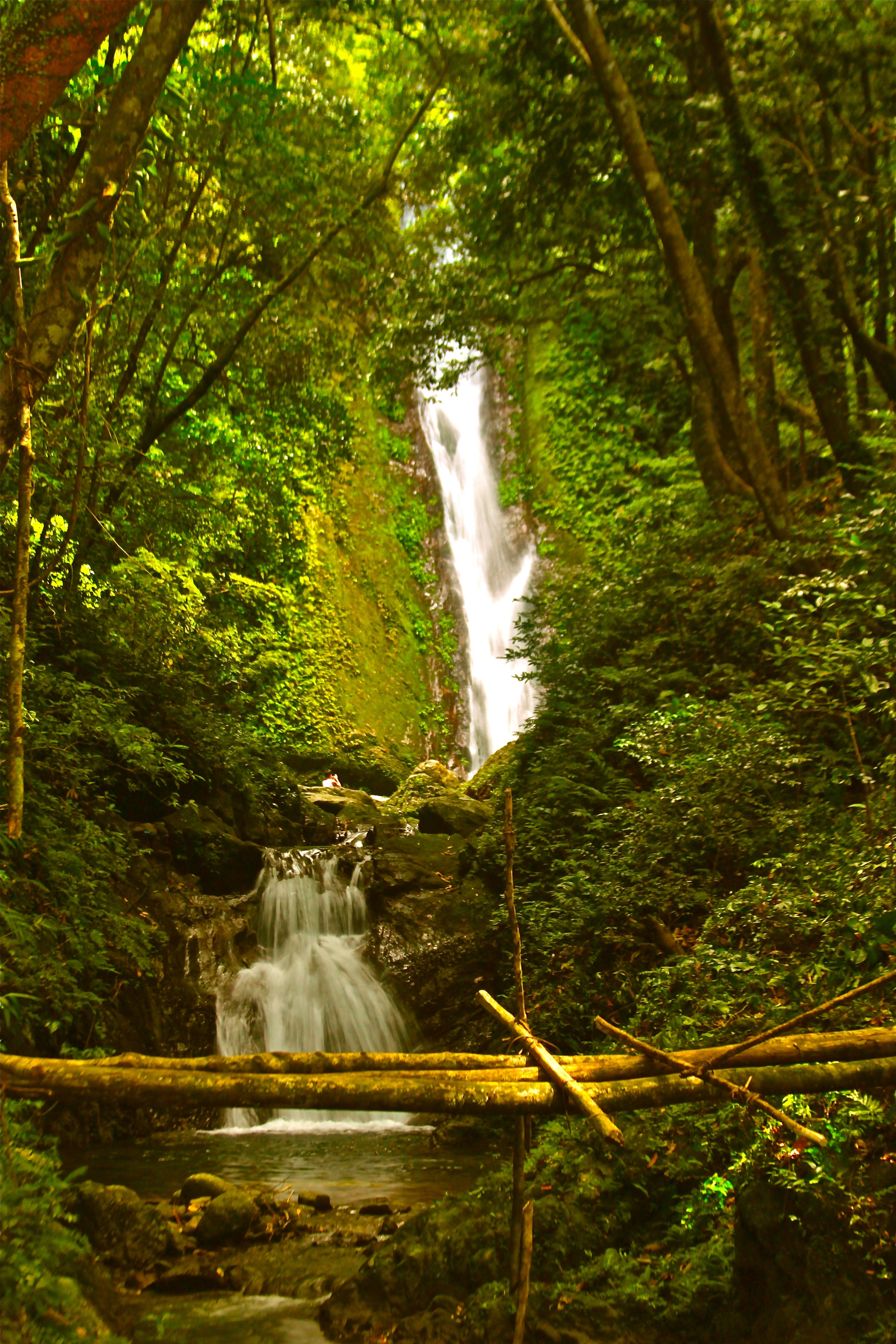
- Kabigan Falls at the Kalbario-Patapat Natural Park

- Location within Luzon Location within Philippines
- Location: Ilocos Norte, Philippines
- Nearest city: Laoag
- Coordinates: 18°31′57″N 120°54′50″E
- Area: 3,800 ha (15 sq mi)
- Established: April 20, 2007
- Governing body: Department of Environment and Natural Resources

The Kalbario–Patapat Natural Park is a protected area in the Philippines, located on the Patapat Mountains in the municipalities of Pagudpud and Adams in northern Ilocos Norte province.

== Protected area ==
The natural park was established on April 20, 2007, by Proclamation no. 1275 encompassing 3,800 hectares (9,400 acres) with a buffer zone of 1,937 hectares (4,790 acres). The park was created under the National Integrated Protected Areas System (NIPAS) of the Department of Environment and Natural Resources.

== Patapat Viaduct ==
In the northern section of the park is the Patapat Viaduct, a 7-kilometre (4.3 mi) highway and part of the Pan-Philippine Highway, allowing travel along the sheer cliffs of the northern coastal mountains of Ilocos Norte overlooking the coast of Pasaleng Bay. Part of the viaduct is an elevated highway between the cliffs and shore constructed to solve the problems of landslides during heavy rains causing accidents or closures.

== See also ==
- List of natural parks of the Philippines
- List of protected areas of the Philippines
