= Burias Pass =

Strait in the Philippines

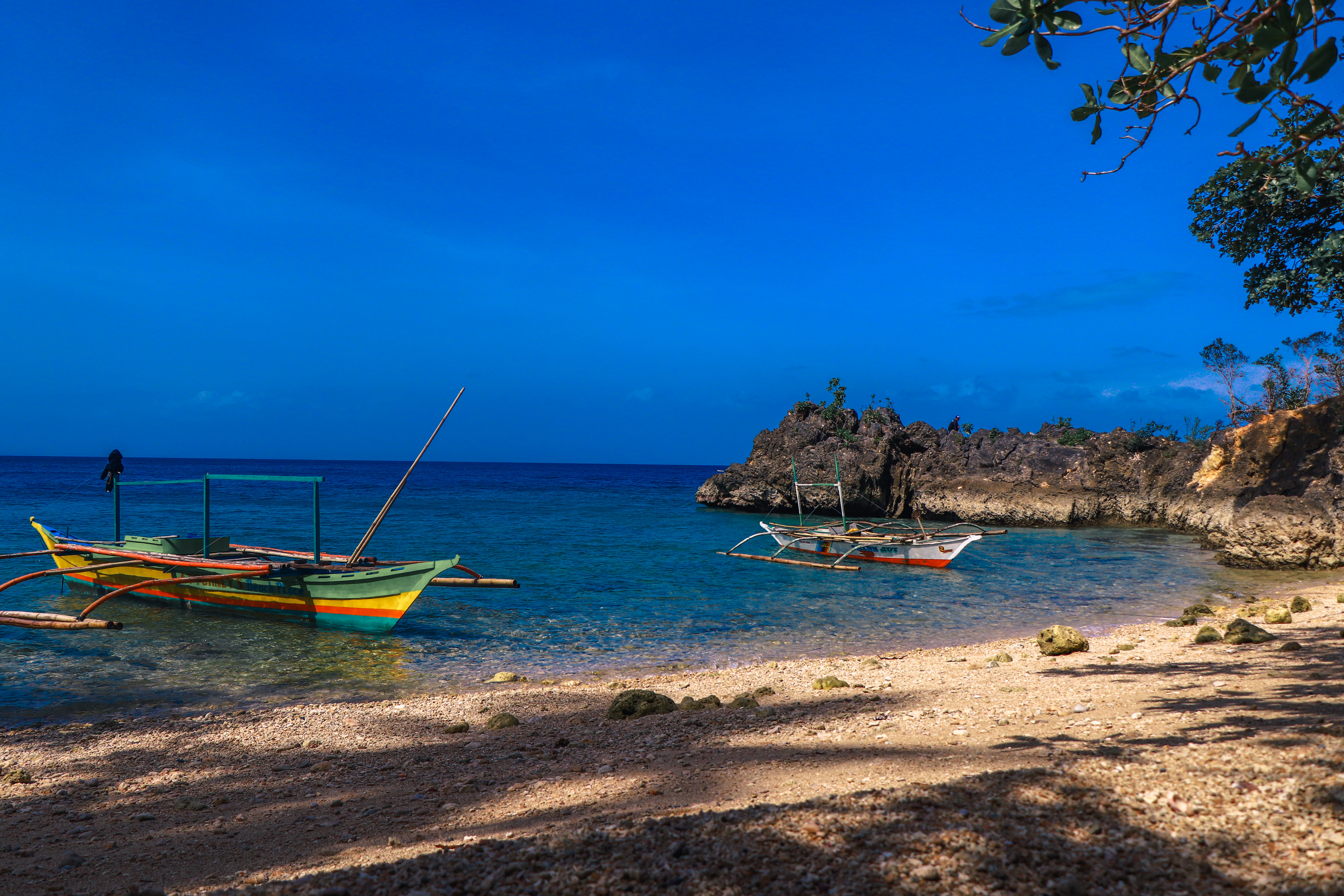
- Burias Pass as seen from Libon, Albay

- Location within the Philippines Burias Pass (Philippines)
- Location: Bicol Peninsula; Burias Island
- Coordinates: 12°57′N 123°18′E
- Type: strait
- Etymology: Burias Island

Burias Pass is the strait that separates Burias Island from the Bicol Peninsula in the Philippines. It connects Ragay Gulf on the north with the Ticao Pass and the Samar Sea on the south. It is considered a very important biodiversity area of the country.

Along with the Ticao Pass, the waters of the Burias Pass are proposed to become a Marine Protected Area. The pass has plankton-rich waters and constant current, and is home to a large marine diversity. Species found there include whale sharks, thresher sharks, hammerhead sharks, tiger sharks, manta rays, dugong, various species of sea turtles, coral reefs, and the globally rare megamouth shark, but the pass also suffers from massive overfishing and poaching, as well as destructive blast fishing.
