= List of natural parks of the Philippines =

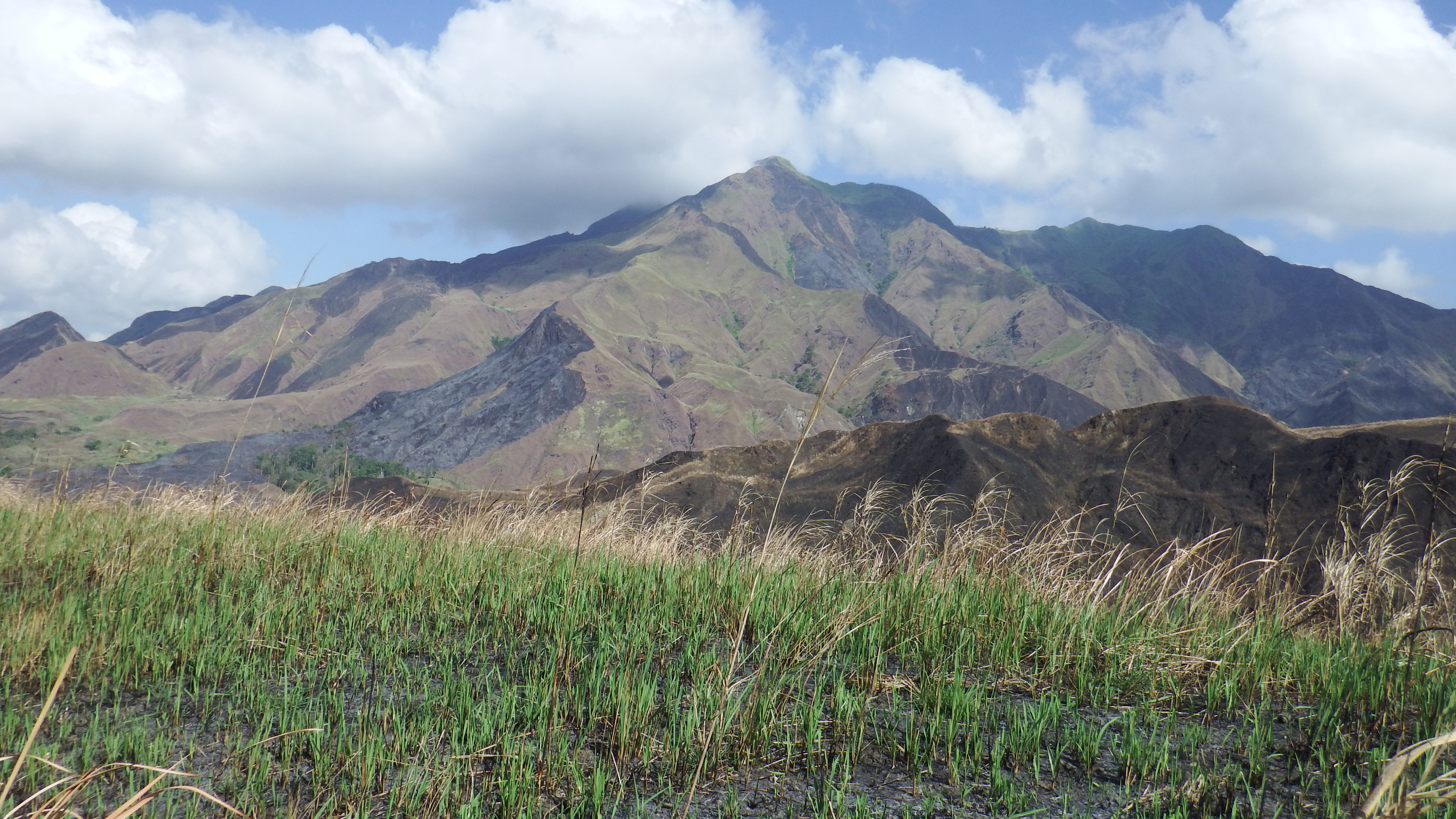
Mount Iglit, part of the Mounts Iglit–Baco Natural Park

In the Philippines, Natural Parks as defined by law are relatively large areas not materially altered by human activity. The extraction of natural resources is not allowed in these areas and they are maintained to protect outstanding natural and scenic areas of national or international significance for scientific, educational, and recreational use.

== Natural parks ==
World Heritage Site or part of a World Heritage Site.
Further information: List of World Heritage Sites in the Philippines

Name	Area	Established	Location		Coordinates
Name	Area	Established	Provinces	Island Group	Coordinates
Kalbario-Patapat Natural Park	3,903.19 ha (9,645.0 acres)	April 20, 2007	Ilocos Norte	Luzon	18°31′57″N 120°54′50″E
Tumauini Watershed Natural Park	6,509.38 ha (16,085.0 acres)	April 20, 2007	Isabela	Luzon	17°18′N 122°00′E
Bataan Natural Park	20,004.17 ha (49,431.4 acres)	April 20, 2007	Bataan	Luzon	14°39′N 120°36′E
Apo Reef Natural Park	15,799.23 ha (39,040.7 acres)	April 20, 2007	Occidental Mindoro	Mindoro	12°42′N 120°24′E
Mounts Iglit–Baco Natural Park	106,655.62 ha (263,551.8 acres)	April 20, 2007	Occidental Mindoro Oriental Mindoro	Mindoro	12°54′N 121°13′E
Mount Guiting-Guiting Natural Park	15,799.23 ha (39,040.7 acres)	April 20, 2007	Romblon	Sibuyan	12°25′N 122°30′E
Bicol Natural Park	5,466.35 ha (13,507.6 acres)	April 20, 2007	Camarines Sur	Luzon	13°55′32″N 122°58′17″E
Mount Isarog Natural Park	10,090.89 ha (24,935.1 acres)	April 20, 2007	Camarines Sur	Luzon	13°39′33″N 123°22′24″E
Catanduanes Natural Park	48,924.09 ha (120,894.1 acres)	April 20, 2007	Catanduanes	Catanduanes	13°48′N 122°24′E
Bongsanglay Natural Park	518.90 ha (1,282.2 acres)	April 20, 2007	Masbate	Masbate	12°23′9″N 123°46′58″E
Bulusan Volcano Natural Park	3,641.47 ha (8,998.3 acres)	April 20, 2007	Sorsogon	Luzon	12°46′12″N 124°0′0″E
Northwest Panay Peninsula Natural Park	12,009.29 ha (29,675.6 acres)	April 20, 2007	Aklan Antique	Panay	11°40′25″N 121°59′55″E
Sibalom Natural Park	6,778.44 ha (16,749.9 acres)	April 20, 2007	Antique	Panay	18°31′57″N 120°54′50″E
Northern Negros Natural Park	70,826.16 ha (175,015.3 acres)	April 20, 2007	Negros Occidental	Negros	10°38′00″N 123°13′00″E
Balinsasayao Twin Lakes Natural Park	8,016.05 ha (19,808.1 acres)	April 20, 2007	Negros Oriental	Negros	9°21′16″N 123°10′46″E
Lake Danao Natural Park	8,016.05 ha (19,808.1 acres)	April 20, 2007	Leyte	Leyte	11°06′N 124°42′E
Mahagnao Volcano Natural Park	340.82 ha (842.2 acres)	April 20, 2007	Leyte	Leyte	10°52′26″N 124°51′35″E
Samar Island Natural Park	335,105.57 ha (828,063.9 acres)	April 20, 2007	Samar Eastern Samar Northern Samar	Samar	12°2′10″N 125°12′40″E
Pasonanca Natural Park	12,102.08 ha (29,904.9 acres)	April 20, 2007	Zamboanga City	Mindanao	7°4′16″N 122°4′32″E
Mount Kalatungan Range Natural Park	22,225.11 ha (54,919.4 acres)	April 20, 2007	Bukidnon	Mindanao	7°54′N 124°48′E
Mount Inayawan Range Natural Park	4,236.19 ha (10,467.9 acres)	April 20, 2007	Lanao del Norte	Mindanao	7°49′10″N 123°55′34″E
Mount Balatukan Range Natural Park	8,437.86 ha (20,850.4 acres)	April 20, 2007	Misamis Oriental	Mindanao	8°48′N 124°54′E
Mount Apo Natural Park	54,974.47 ha (135,844.9 acres)	February 3, 2004	Cotabato	Mindanao	6°59′15″N 125°16′15″E
Mayon Volcano Natural Park	5,775.7 ha (14,272 acres)	November 21, 2000	Albay	Luzon	13°15′24″N 123°41′6″E

== Gallery ==
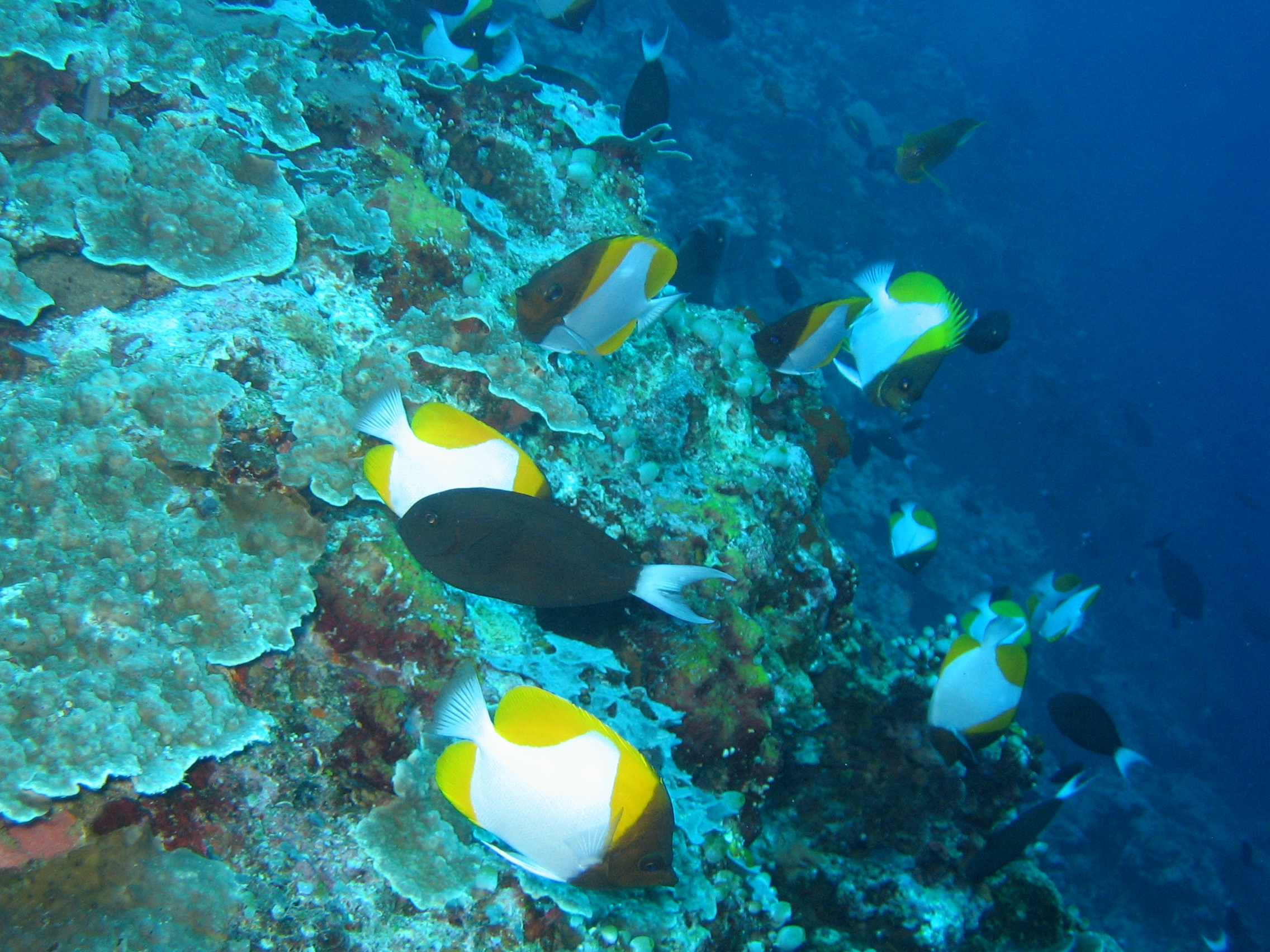
Apo Reef Natural Park

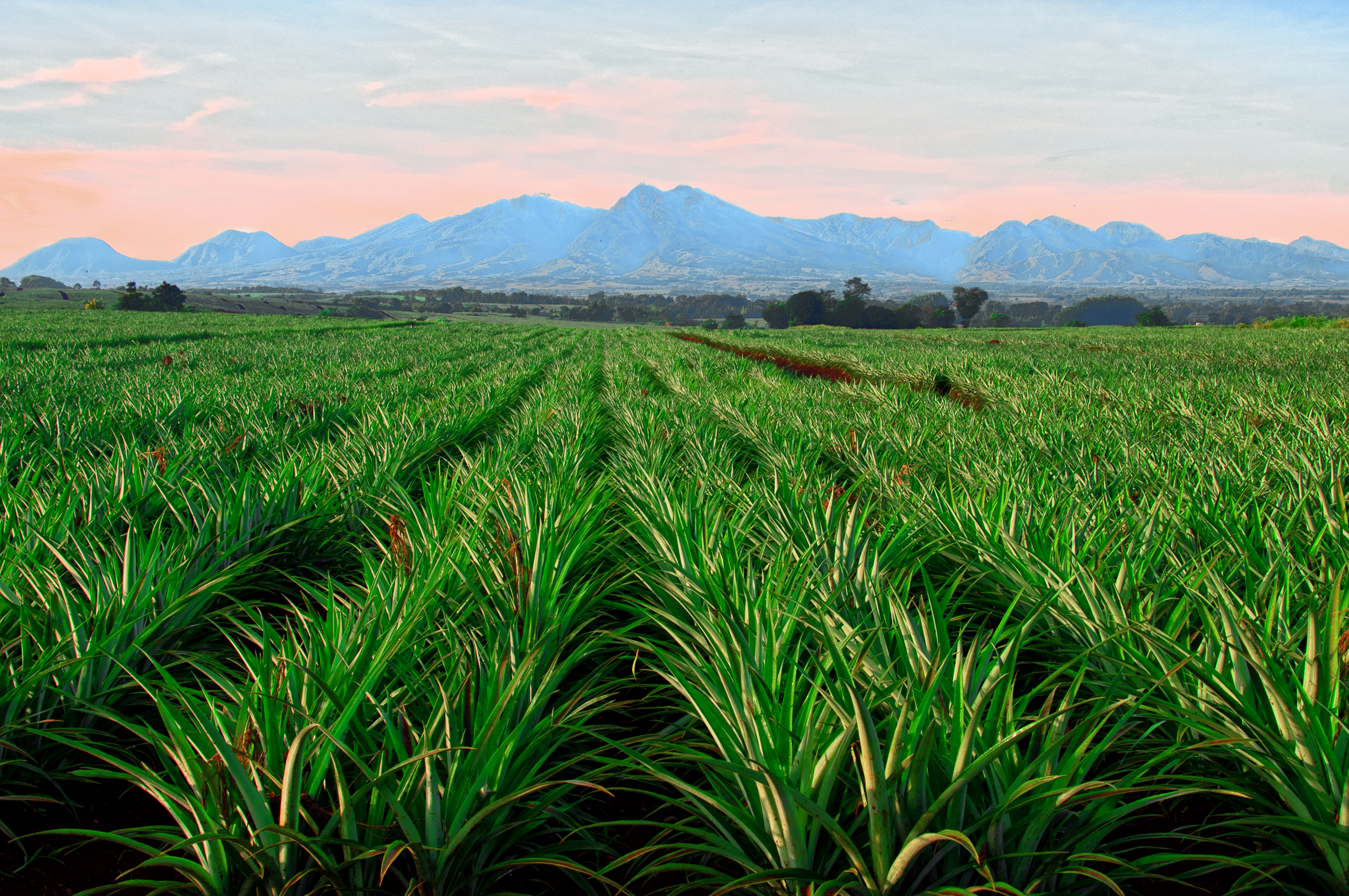
Mount Kitanglad Range Natural Park

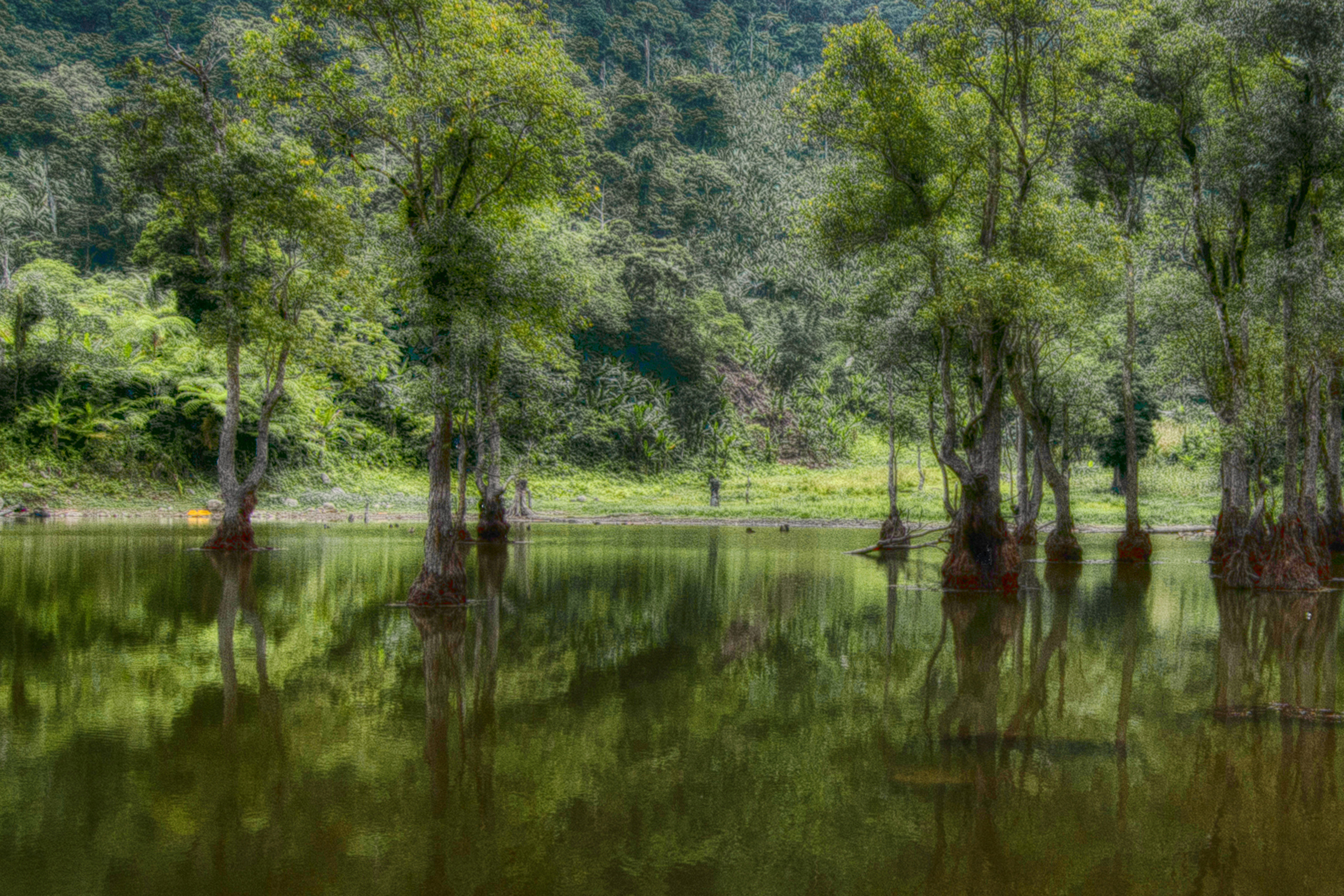
Balinsasayao Twin Lakes Natural Park

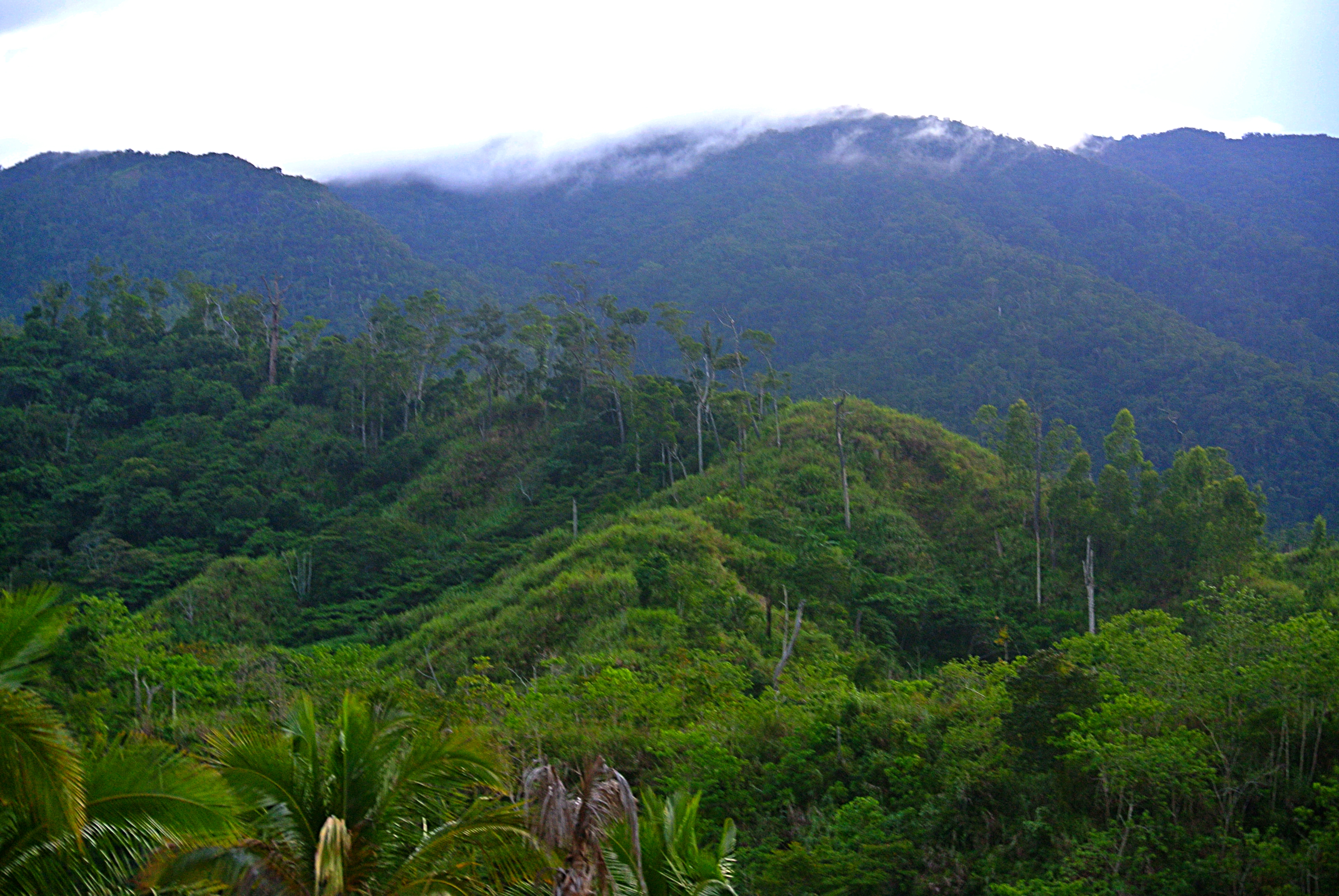
Northern Sierra Madre Natural Park

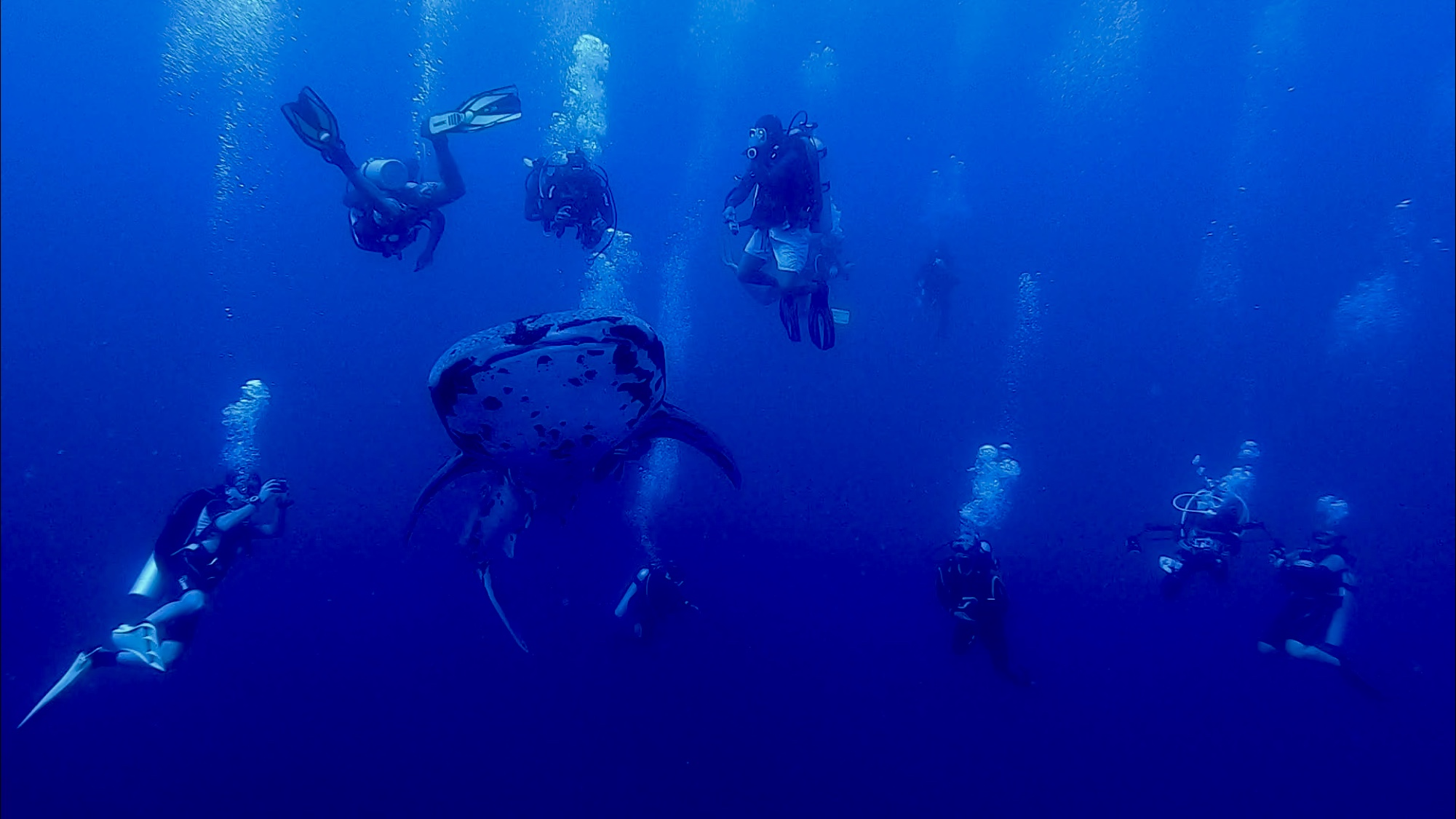
Tubbataha Reef Natural Park

== See also ==
- List of protected areas of the Philippines
- Environment of the Philippines
- List of botanical gardens and arboretums in the Philippines
