= San Miguel Island (Masbate) =

Filipino island

Coordinates: 12.714°N 123.595°E

San Miguel Island is an island under the jurisdiction of the Philippine province of Masbate. The island has a lighthouse mounted atop a concrete tower. San Miguel Island is located "just off the northern tip" of Ticao Island.

== See also ==
- List of islands of the Philippines
