= Tito Espinosa =

Member of the Philippine House of Representatives (1943–1995)

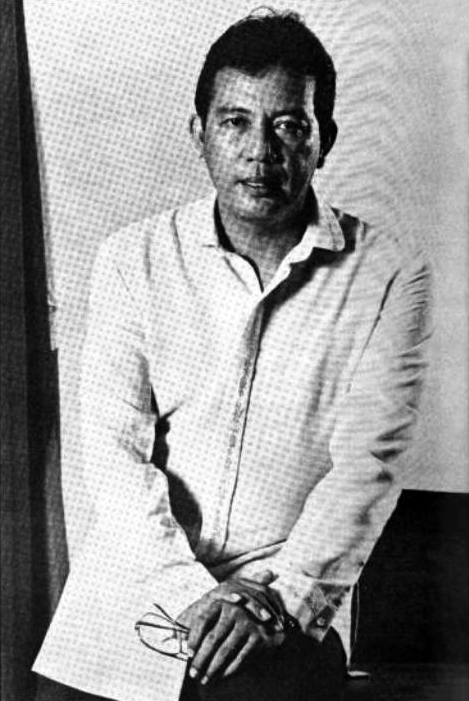
- Espinosa official portrait during the 8th Congress.

Member of the Philippine House of Representatives from Masbate
- In office June 30, 1987 – February 28, 1995
- Preceded by: District created
- Succeeded by: Vida Verzosa Espinosa
- Constituency: 1st district

Personal details
- Born: Tito de la Rosa Espinosa; January 16, 1943
- Died: February 28, 1995 (aged 52) Quezon City, Philippines
- Party: Lakas (1992–1995)
- Other political affiliations: Independent (1987–1992)
- Profession: Politician

Tito de la Rosa Espinosa (January 16, 1943 – February 28, 1995) was a Filipino politician who served as Member of the Philippine House of Representatives from Masbate's 1st district from 1987, until his assassination on February 28, 1995, in the Batasang Pambansa Complex.
