= Burias (island) =

Island in the Philippines

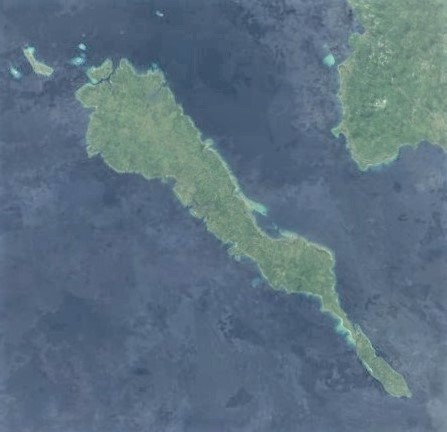
- Burias island satellite image captured by Sentinel-2 in 2016

- Location within Philippines

Geography
- Coordinates: 12°52′53″N 123°12′27″E
- Adjacent to: Burias Pass; Ragay Gulf; Sibuyan Sea
- Highest elevation: 1,093 ft (333.1 m)
- Highest point: Mount Engañoso

Administration
- Philippines
- Region: Bicol Region
- Province: Masbate
- Municipality: Claveria; San Pascual

Demographics
- Population: 85,374 (2024)
- Ethnic groups: Masbateño; Bicolano

Additional information

Burias Island is one of the three major islands of Masbate province in the Philippines. It is separated from the Bicol Peninsula by the Burias Pass. The other two major islands are Ticao Island and Masbate Island. The island has two municipalities, Claveria and San Pascual.
