= Monreal, Masbate =

Municipality in Masbate, Philippines

Monreal
- Municipality
- Municipality of Monreal
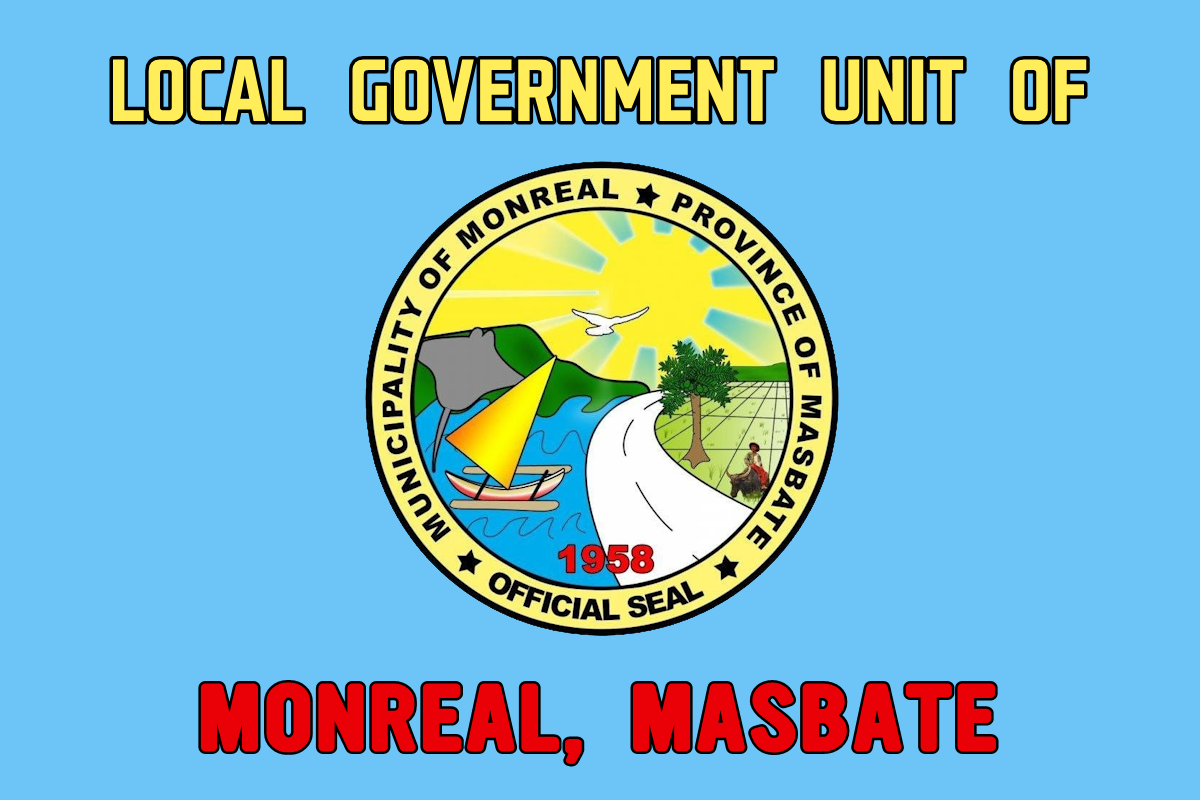
- Flag

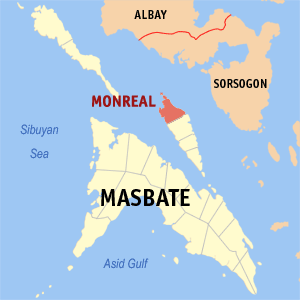
- Map of Masbate with Monreal highlighted
- Interactive map of Monreal
- Location within the Philippines
- Coordinates: 12°38′38″N 123°39′53″E
- Country: Philippines
- Region: Bicol Region
- Province: Masbate
- District: 1st district
- Barangays: 11 (see Barangays)

Government
  - Type: Sangguniang Bayan
  - Mayor: Glenda L. Villahermosa
  - Vice Mayor: Pal Duano
  - Representative: Richard Kho
  - Municipal Council: Members: Marvin B. Deinla; Intsika A. Escorel; Ruel E. Espares; Dan U. Gebilaguin; Elvie S. Huarde; Tato G. Mergais; Vicky R. Saturnino; Freddie T. Yusi
  - Electorate: 19,627 voters (2025)

Area
  - Total: 128.67 km^{2} (49.68 sq mi)
- Elevation: 67 m (220 ft)
- Highest elevation: 331 m (1,086 ft)
- Lowest elevation: 0 m (0 ft)

Population (2024 census)
  - Total: 25,843
  - Density: 200.85/km^{2} (520.19/sq mi)
  - Households: 5,502

Economy
  - Income class: 3rd municipal income class
  - Poverty incidence: 27.54% (2023)
  - Revenue: ₱ 14.41 million (2024)
  - Assets: ₱ 284 million (2024)
  - Expenditure: ₱ 146.9 million (2024)
  - Liabilities: ₱ 79.01 million (2024)

Service provider
  - Electricity: Ticao Island Electric Cooperative (TISELCO)
- Time zone: UTC+8 (PST)
- ZIP code: 5418
- PSGC: 0504114000
- IDD : area code: +63 (0)56
- Native languages: Masbateño; Tagalog

Monreal, officially the Municipality of Monreal, is a municipality in the province of Masbate, Philippines. According to the 2024 census, it has a population of 25,843 people.

It is located on the northern part of Ticao Island. The town is known as the location where the Monreal Stones are found. These are two limestone tablets inscribed with ancient syllabic script, believed to be one of the earliest forms of writing in the country, called baybayin.

== Geography ==
=== Barangays ===
Monreal is politically subdivided into 11 barangays. Each barangay consists of puroks and some have sitios.

- Cantorna
- Famosa
- MacArthur
- Maglambong
- Morocborocan
- Poblacion
- Guinhadap
- Real
- Rizal
- Santo Niño
- Togoron

=== Climate ===
Climate data for Monreal, Masbate
Month	Jan	Feb	Mar	Apr	May	Jun	Jul	Aug	Sep	Oct	Nov	Dec	Year
Mean daily maximum °C (°F)	27 (81)	28 (82)	29 (84)	31 (88)	31 (88)	30 (86)	29 (84)	30 (86)	29 (84)	29 (84)	29 (84)	28 (82)	29 (84)
Mean daily minimum °C (°F)	22 (72)	21 (70)	22 (72)	23 (73)	24 (75)	25 (77)	25 (77)	25 (77)	25 (77)	24 (75)	23 (73)	23 (73)	24 (74)
Average precipitation mm (inches)	65 (2.6)	44 (1.7)	42 (1.7)	39 (1.5)	87 (3.4)	150 (5.9)	184 (7.2)	153 (6.0)	163 (6.4)	154 (6.1)	127 (5.0)	100 (3.9)	1,308 (51.4)
Average rainy days	13.9	9.2	11.1	12.5	19.6	24.3	26.5	25.0	25.5	24.4	19.4	15.1	226.5
Source: Meteoblue

== Demographics ==
Population census of Monreal
Year	Pop.	±% p.a.
1990	18,796	—
1995	18,775	−0.02%
2000	19,832	+1.18%
2007	21,693	+1.24%
2010	25,366	+5.86%
2015	26,614	+0.92%
2020	25,164	−1.17%
2024	25,843	+0.64%
Source: Philippine Statistics Authority

In the 2024 census, the population of Monreal was 25,843 people, with a density of 200 inhabitants per square kilometre or 520 inhabitants per square mile.

== Economy ==
Poverty incidence of Monreal (%)

Source: Philippine Statistics Authority

Monreal's local economy is based on fishing. A local conservation effort to protect the environment lead to the development of tourism industry in the municipality. The Halea Island Retreat and Nature Park is the number one attraction for tourists both local and foreign, creating employment opportunities for the local folks and generating revenues for the local government in terms of taxes.

== Archaeological and Ecological Landscape and Seascape of Ticao ==
The municipality is part of Ticao island, which is known as an archaeological landscape, possessing thousands of pre-colonial artifacts such as the Baybayin-inscribed Rizal Stone, Ticao gold spike teeth, burial jars of varying designs and sizes, jade beads, human face rock statues, and the Ticao petrographs. Much of the homes in Ticao island use these archaeological finds to design their interiors. The island is also an ecological frontier for the conservation of manta rays. The island also possesses a 'rare subspecies' of Visayan warty pig that is almost near extinction.

== Education ==
The Monreal Schools District Office governs all educational institutions within the municipality. It oversees the management and operations of all private and public, from primary to secondary schools.

=== Primary and elementary schools ===
- Cantorna Elementary School
- Cogon Elementary School
- Dalakit Elementary School
- Famosa Elementary School
- Flor Mores Elementary School
- Guinhadap Elementary School
- Lapu-Lapu Elementary School
- Macarthur Elementary School
- Maglambong Elementary School
- Monreal Central School
- Morocborocan Elementary School
- Real Elementary School
- Sto Niño Elementary School
- Togoron Elementary School

=== Secondary schools ===
- Cogon High School
- Don Benito Maristela Memorial High School
- Gerardo C. Cardiño Sr. High School
- Liceo de San Francisco Mission School
- Magsaysay Memorial Academy
- Monreal National High School
- Real Institute Incorporated
- Rizal Integrated School
