= San Pascual, Masbate =

Municipality in Masbate, Philippines

San Pascual
- Municipality
- Municipality of San Pascual
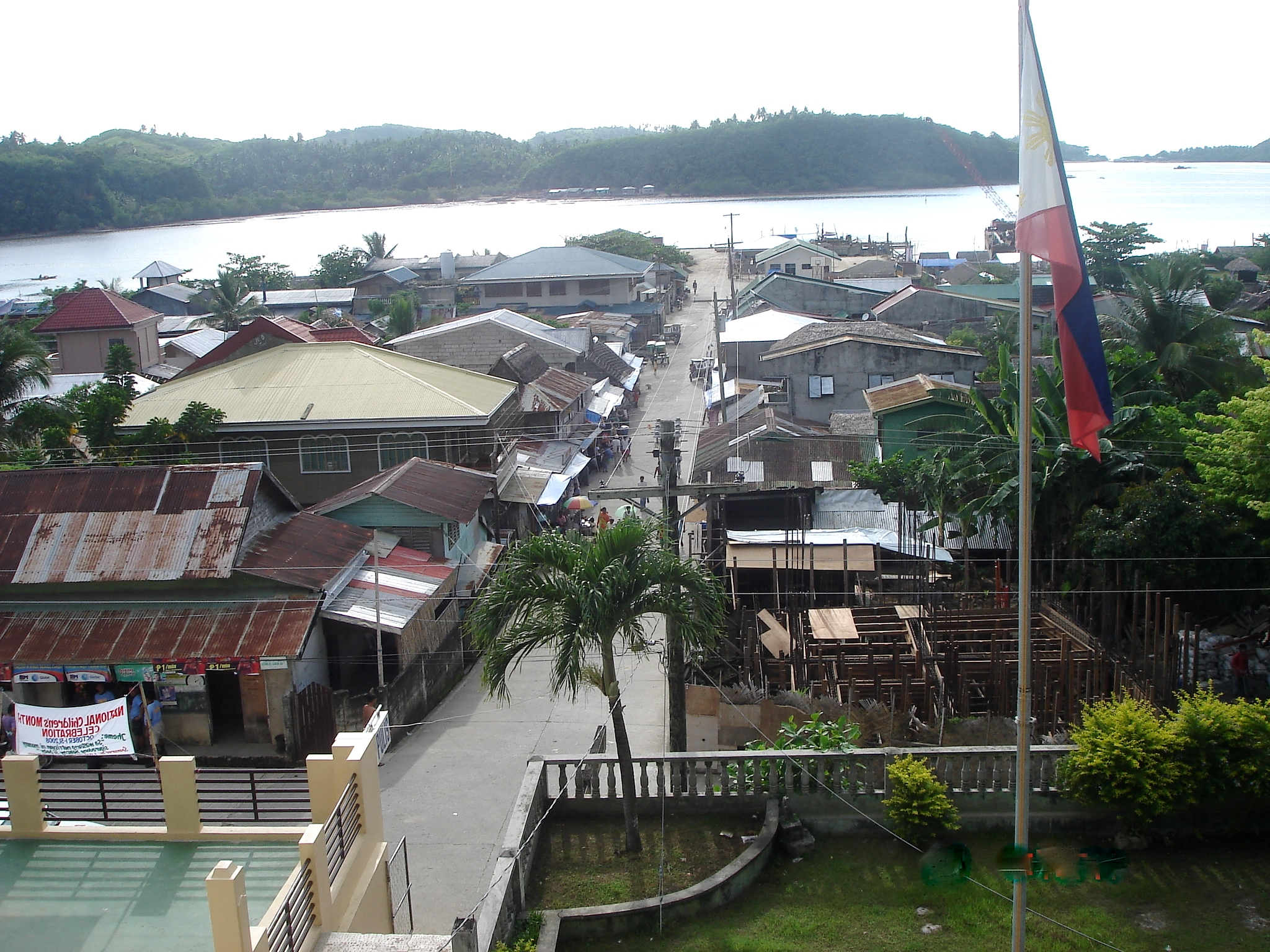
- Downtown area

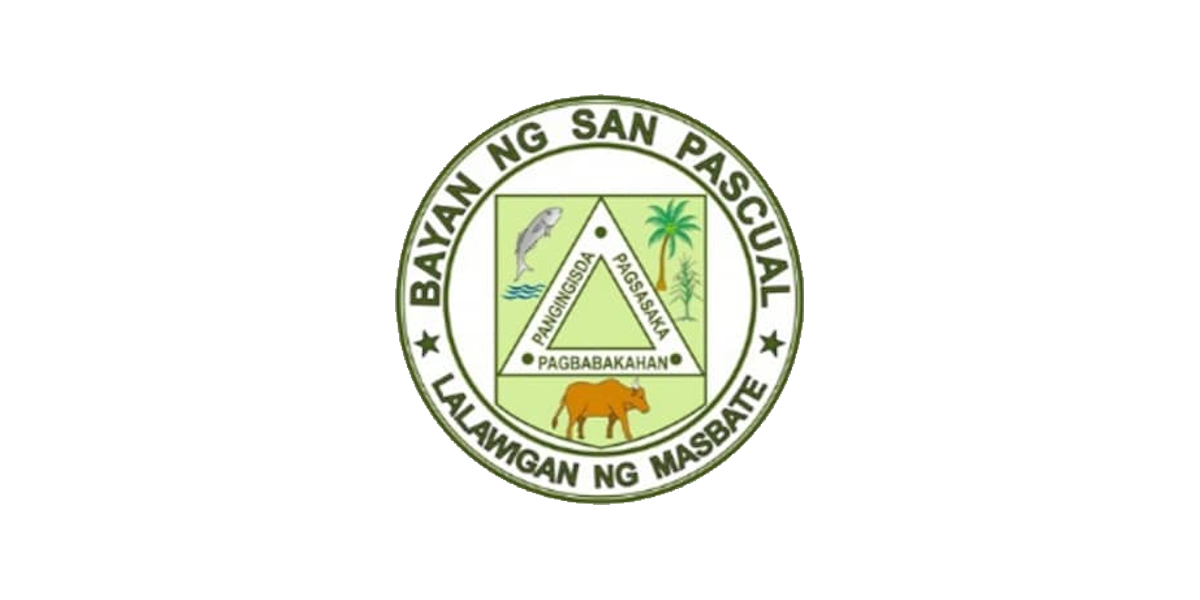
- Flag

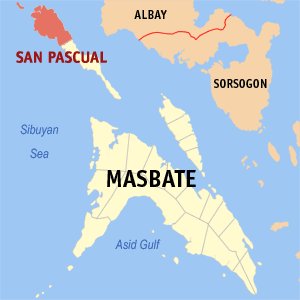
- Map of Masbate with San Pascual highlighted
- Interactive map of San Pascual
- Location within the Philippines
- Coordinates: 13°07′43″N 122°58′39″E
- Country: Philippines
- Region: Bicol Region
- Province: Masbate
- District: 1st district
- Barangays: 22 (see Barangays)

Government
  - Type: Sangguniang Bayan
  - Mayor: Niño Maximino A. Lazaro
  - Vice Mayor: Haira L. Rivera
  - Representative: Narciso R. Bravo Jr.
  - Municipal Council: Members: Pascual R. Placencia; Gonzales M. Villapañe; Manilou G. Hermosa; Leticia A. Lete; Marlon S. Fuentes; Lelleniza R. Sinagpulo; Alvin B. Fontelar; Erlinda J. Evangelista
  - Electorate: 32,674 voters (2025)

Area
  - Total: 246.65 km^{2} (95.23 sq mi)
- Elevation: 47.5 m (156 ft)
- Highest elevation: 414 m (1,358 ft)
- Lowest elevation: 0 m (0 ft)

Population (2024 census)
  - Total: 44,641
  - Density: 180.99/km^{2} (468.76/sq mi)
  - Households: 10,102

Economy
  - Income class: 1st municipal income class
  - Poverty incidence: 25.99% (2023)
  - Revenue: ₱ 249.9 million (2024)
  - Assets: ₱ 848.9 million (2024)
  - Expenditure: ₱ 79.89 million (2024)
  - Liabilities: ₱ 222.8 million (2024)

Service provider
  - Electricity: Masbate Electric Cooperative (MASELCO)
- Time zone: UTC+8 (PST)
- ZIP code: 5420
- PSGC: 0504120000
- IDD : area code: +63 (0)56
- Native languages: Central Bikol; Tagalog
- Website: www.sanpascual-masbate.gov.ph

San Pascual, officially the Municipality of San Pascual, is a municipality in the province of Masbate, Philippines. According to the 2024 census, it has a population of 44,641 people.

In addition to the northern part of Burias Island, the islands of Busing, Templo (or Iniwaran,) and another six small unpopulated islands belong to the municipality.

== Geography ==
=== Barangays ===
San Pascual is politically subdivided into 22 barangays. Each barangay consists of puroks and some have sitios.

- Boca Chica
- Bolod (Poblacion)
- Busing
- Dangcalan
- Halabangbaybay
- Iniwaran
- Ki-Buaya (Rizal)
- Ki-Romero (Roxas)
- Malaking Ilog
- Laurente
- Mabini
- Mabuhay
- Mapanique
- Nazareno
- Pinamasingan
- Quintina
- San Jose
- Terraplin
- Santa Cruz
- San Rafael
- Makahoy
- Cueva

=== Climate ===
Climate data for San Pascual, Masbate
Month	Jan	Feb	Mar	Apr	May	Jun	Jul	Aug	Sep	Oct	Nov	Dec	Year
Mean daily maximum °C (°F)	27 (81)	28 (82)	29 (84)	31 (88)	31 (88)	31 (88)	30 (86)	29 (84)	29 (84)	29 (84)	29 (84)	28 (82)	29 (85)
Mean daily minimum °C (°F)	22 (72)	22 (72)	22 (72)	24 (75)	24 (75)	25 (77)	25 (77)	25 (77)	25 (77)	24 (75)	24 (75)	23 (73)	24 (75)
Average precipitation mm (inches)	55 (2.2)	36 (1.4)	45 (1.8)	42 (1.7)	114 (4.5)	184 (7.2)	245 (9.6)	224 (8.8)	238 (9.4)	171 (6.7)	130 (5.1)	94 (3.7)	1,578 (62.1)
Average rainy days	13.0	9.5	11.8	12.7	21.3	25.3	28.3	26.5	26.4	24.2	19.9	16.1	235
Source: Meteoblue

== Demographics ==
Population census of San Pascual

Year	Pop.	±% p.a.
1903	976	—
1918	1,988	+4.86%
1939	4,734	+4.22%
1948	6,960	+4.38%
1960	6,633	−0.40%
1970	25,297	+14.31%
1975	35,426	+6.99%
1980	38,630	+1.75%

Year	Pop.	±% p.a.
1990	33,396	−1.45%
1995	34,705	+0.72%
2000	37,868	+1.89%
2007	41,736	+1.35%
2010	44,753	+2.57%
2015	46,674	+0.80%
2020	44,449	−1.02%
2024	44,641	+0.10%

Source: Philippine Statistics Authority

In the 2024 census, the population of San Pascual was 44,641 people, with a density of 180 inhabitants per square kilometre or 470 inhabitants per square mile.

== Economy ==
Poverty incidence of San Pascual (%)

Source: Philippine Statistics Authority

== Tourism ==
One of the popular tourist destinations in the municipality of San Pascual is the Sombrero Island with its pure white sand beach.

== Education ==
There are two schools district offices which govern all educational institutions within the municipality. They oversee the management and operations of all private and public, from primary to secondary schools. These are the:

- San Pascual North Schools District
- San Pascual South Schools District

=== Primary and elementary schools ===
- Abner Buro Elementary School
- Acacia Elementary School
- Bayanihan Elementary School
- Boca Chica Elementary School
- Busing Integrated School
- Cueva Elementary School
- Dancalan Elementary School
- Donato Dela Pena Elementary School
- Dr.Antero M. Nazareno Elementary School
- Florentino D. Peñalosa Elementary School
- Gemino Elementary School
- Gregorio T. Vilar Elementary School
- Halabangbaybay Elementary School
- Iniwaran Elementary School
- Juanito G. Alburo Elementary School
- Laurente Elementary School
- Lukban Elementary School
- Luksohon Elementary School
- Mabuhay Elementary School
- Mapanique Elementary School
- Nazareno Elementary School
- Palanas Elementary School
- Paral Elementary School
- Patrocenio G. Dela Torre Elementary School
- Pedro S. Lazaro Elementary School
- Quintina Elementary School
- Ramona Elementary School
- Rizal Elementary School
- San Pascual Central School
- San Pedro Elementary School
- San Rafael Elementary School
- San Rafael SDA Multigrade School
- Segundina L. Rivera Elementary School
- Sta. Cruz Elementary School
- Sulficio Elliot Elementary School
- Tuburan Elementary School

=== Secondary schools ===
- Adelina P. Laurio National High School
- Amado E. Lazaro High School
- Halabangbaybay National High School
- Labangco High School
- Mabuhay Integrated School
- Maximino S. Lazaro Integrated School
- Palanas National High School
- Patrocinio Dela Torre National High School
- Roxas Integrated High School
- San Pascual National High School
- San Pascual Polytechnic College
- San Pedro National High School
- Vicente D. Alburo High School

== Gallery ==
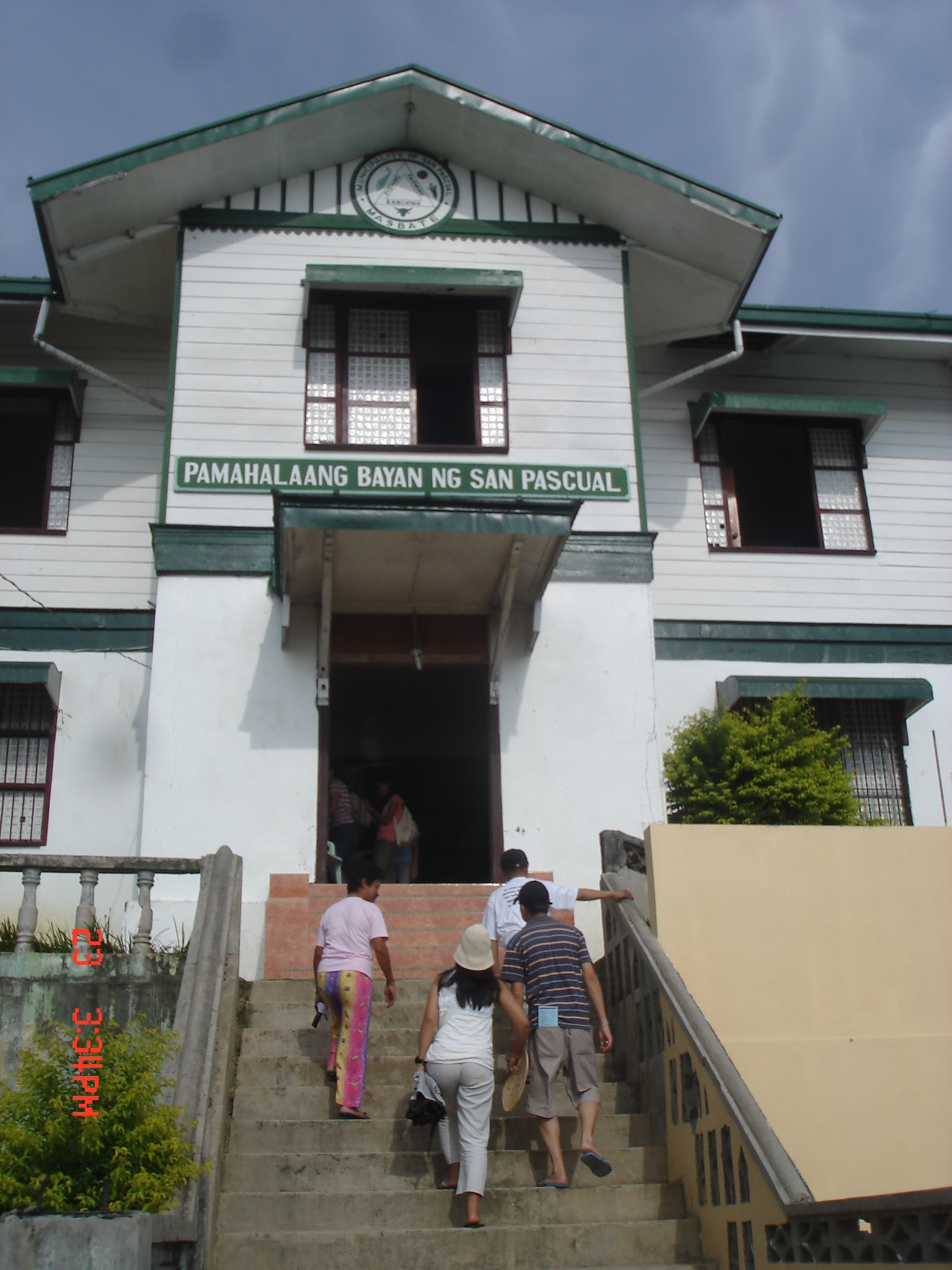
Municipal Hall

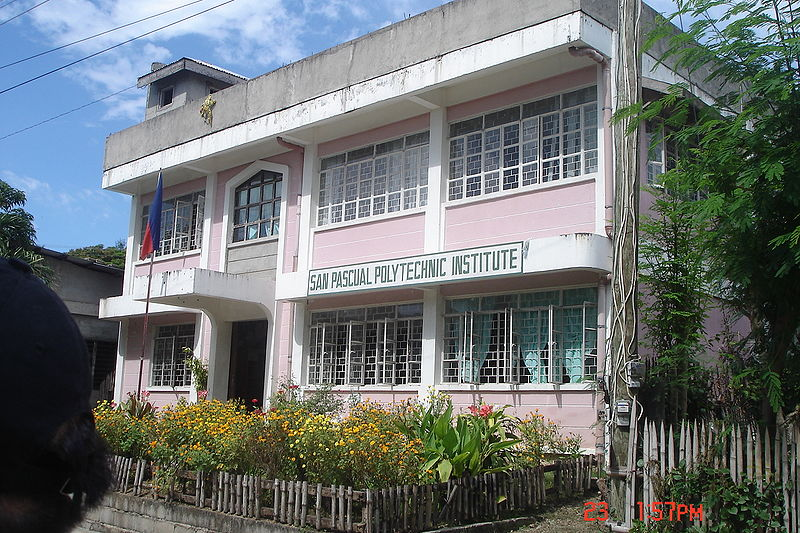
San Pascual Polytechnic Institute

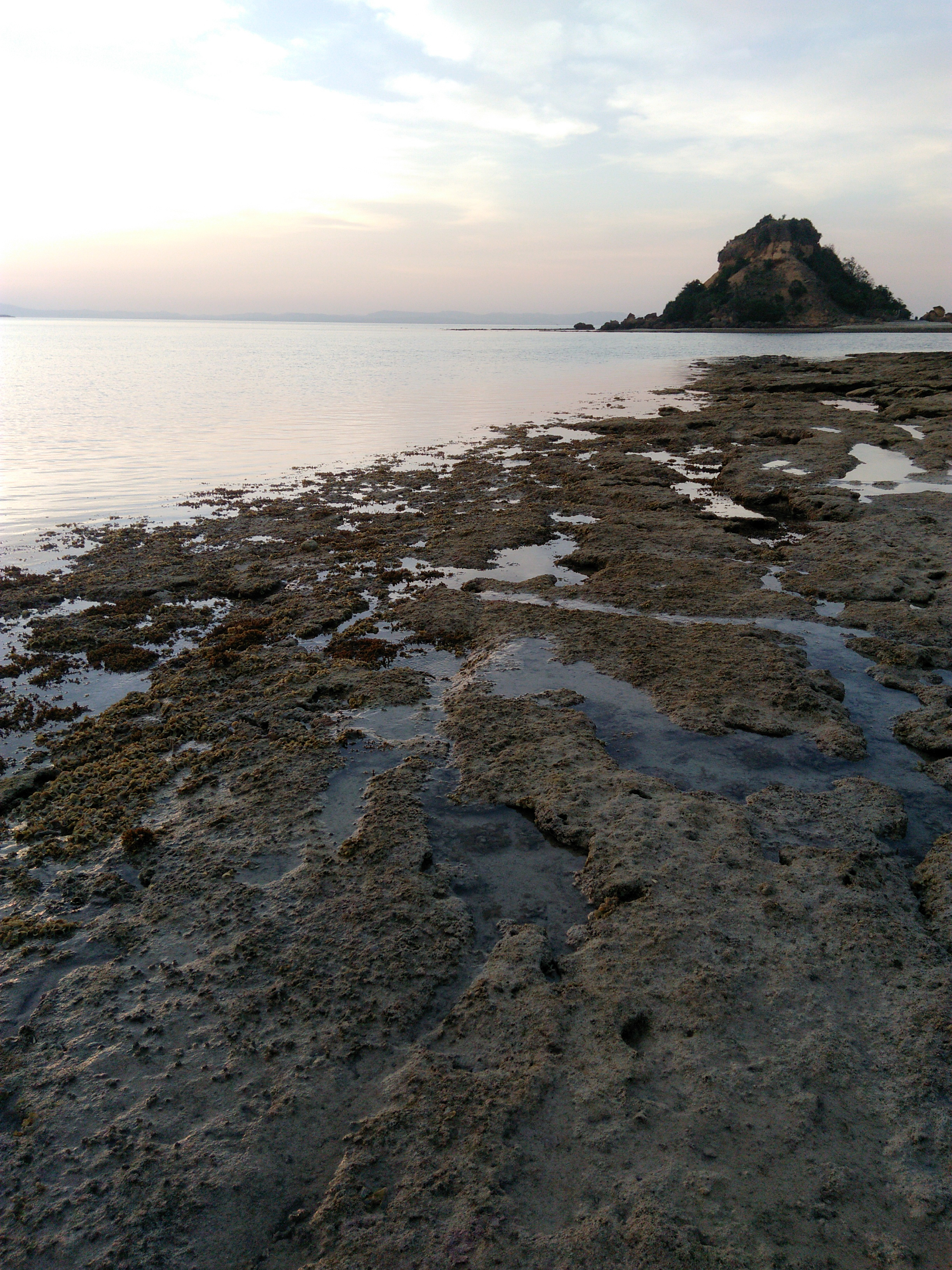
Sombrero Island
