= San Jacinto, Masbate =

Municipality in Masbate, Philippines

San Jacinto Ticao
- Municipality
- Municipality of San Jacinto
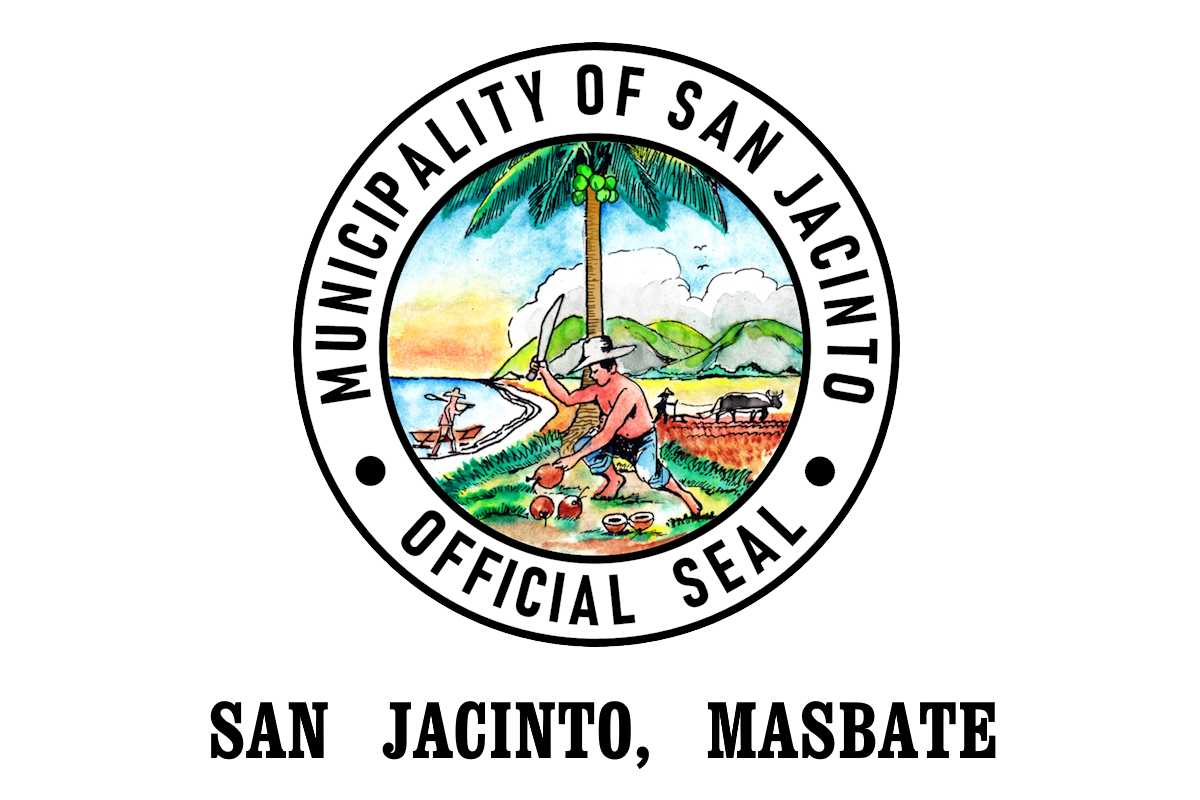
- Flag Seal

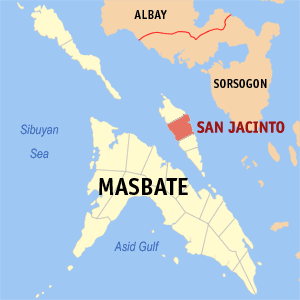
- Map of Masbate with San Jacinto highlighted
- Interactive map of San Jacinto
- Location within the Philippines
- Coordinates: 12°34′06″N 123°44′01″E
- Country: Philippines
- Region: Bicol Region
- Province: Masbate
- District: 1st district
- Barangays: 21 (see Barangays)

Government
  - Type: Sangguniang Bayan
  - Mayor: Francisco P. Altarejos
  - Vice Mayor: Leny Arcenas
  - Representative: Richard Kho
  - Municipal Council: Members: Ma. Chinel A. Delavin; Franz Cezar Y. Altarejos; Letty D. Bartolata; Richard D. Adiaton; Norman B. Meteoro; Benito R. Omilgo, Jr.; Tara Anne S. Real; Reynard A. Altiche
  - Electorate: 22,005 voters (2025)

Area
  - Total: 122.40 km^{2} (47.26 sq mi)
- Elevation: 34 m (112 ft)
- Highest elevation: 332 m (1,089 ft)
- Lowest elevation: 0 m (0 ft)

Population (2024 census)
  - Total: 29,458
  - Density: 240.67/km^{2} (623.33/sq mi)
  - Households: 7,474

Economy
  - Income class: 3rd municipal income class
  - Poverty incidence: 19.2% (2023)
  - Revenue: ₱ 169.2 million (2024)
  - Assets: ₱ 787.7 million (2024)
  - Expenditure: ₱ 161.2 million (2024)
  - Liabilities: ₱ 196 million (2024)

Service provider
  - Electricity: Ticao Island Electric Cooperative (TISELCO)
- Time zone: UTC+8 (PST)
- ZIP code: 5417
- PSGC: 0504119000
- IDD : area code: +63 (0)56
- Native languages: Masbateño; Tagalog
- Website: https://sjmasbate.gov.ph

San Jacinto, officially the Municipality of San Jacinto, is a municipality in the province of Masbate, Philippines. According to the 2024 census, it has a population of 29,458 people.

It is the commercial capital of Ticao Island.

== Geography ==
=== Barangays ===
San Jacinto is politically subdivided into 21 barangays. Each barangay consists of puroks and some have sitios.

- Almiñe
- Bagacay
- Bagahanglad
- Bartolabac
- Burgos
- Calipat-An
- Danao
- Dorong-an Daplian
- Interior
- Jagna-an
- Luna
- Mabini
- Piña
- District I (Poblacion)
- District II (Poblacion)
- District III (Poblacion)
- District IV (Poblacion)
- Roosevelt
- San Isidro
- Sta. Rosa
- Washington

=== Climate ===
Climate data for San Jacinto, Masbate
Month	Jan	Feb	Mar	Apr	May	Jun	Jul	Aug	Sep	Oct	Nov	Dec	Year
Mean daily maximum °C (°F)	27 (81)	28 (82)	29 (84)	31 (88)	31 (88)	30 (86)	29 (84)	30 (86)	29 (84)	29 (84)	29 (84)	28 (82)	29 (84)
Mean daily minimum °C (°F)	22 (72)	21 (70)	22 (72)	23 (73)	24 (75)	25 (77)	25 (77)	25 (77)	25 (77)	24 (75)	23 (73)	23 (73)	24 (74)
Average precipitation mm (inches)	65 (2.6)	44 (1.7)	42 (1.7)	39 (1.5)	87 (3.4)	150 (5.9)	184 (7.2)	153 (6.0)	163 (6.4)	154 (6.1)	127 (5.0)	100 (3.9)	1,308 (51.4)
Average rainy days	13.9	9.2	11.1	12.5	19.6	24.3	26.5	25.0	25.5	24.4	19.4	15.1	226.5
Source: Meteoblue

== Demographics ==
Population census of San Jacinto

Year	Pop.	±% p.a.
1903	4,845	—
1918	8,142	+3.52%
1939	15,134	+3.00%
1948	20,208	+3.26%
1960	17,330	−1.27%
1970	21,660	+2.25%
1975	22,765	+1.00%
1980	26,389	+3.00%

Year	Pop.	±% p.a.
1990	23,068	−1.34%
1995	24,048	+0.78%
2000	24,780	+0.64%
2007	26,508	+0.93%
2010	27,974	+1.98%
2015	30,372	+1.58%
2020	29,686	−0.48%
2024	29,458	−0.18%

Source: Philippine Statistics Authority

In the 2024 census, the population of San Jacinto was 29,458 people, with a density of 240 inhabitants per square kilometre or 620 inhabitants per square mile.

== Economy ==
Poverty incidence of San Jacinto (%)

Source: Philippine Statistics Authority

== Archaeological and ecological landscape and seascape of Ticao ==
The municipality is part of Ticao island, which is known as an archaeological landscape, possessing thousands of pre-colonial artifacts such as the Baybayin-inscribed Rizal Stone, Ticao gold spike teeth, Burial jars of varying designs and sizes, jade beads, human face rock statues, and the Ticao petrographs. Much of the homes in Ticao island use these archaeological finds to design their interiors. The island is also an ecological frontier for the conservation of manta rays. The island also possesses a 'rare subspecies' of Visayan warty pig, that is almost near extinction.

== Education ==
The San Jacinto Schools District Office governs all educational institutions within the municipality. It oversees the management and operations of all private and public, from primary to secondary schools.

=== Primary and elementary schools ===
- Almiñe Elementary School
- Anita P. Altarejos Elementary School
- Bagacay Elementary School
- Bagahanglad Elementary School
- Bartolabac Elementary School
- Burgos Elementary School
- Calipat-an Elementary School
- Danao Elementary School
- Dapli-an Elementary School
- Guiwanon Elementary School
- Happy Victory School
- Interior Elementary School
- Jagna-an Elementary School
- Leonardo Barrun Elementary School
- Liceo de San Jacinto Foundation
- Luna Elementary School
- Mabini Elementary School
- Piña Elementary School
- Roosevelt Elementary School
- San Isidro Elementary School
- San Jacinto Central School
- Tacdugan Elementary School
- Tutuban Elementary School
- Washington Elementary School

=== Secondary schools ===
- Bagahanglad National High School
- Bartolabac Integrated School
- Emilio Lee-Llacer Sr. High School
- San Jacinto National High School
