= Claveria, Masbate =

Municipality in Masbate, Philippines

Claveria
- Municipality
- Municipality of Claveria
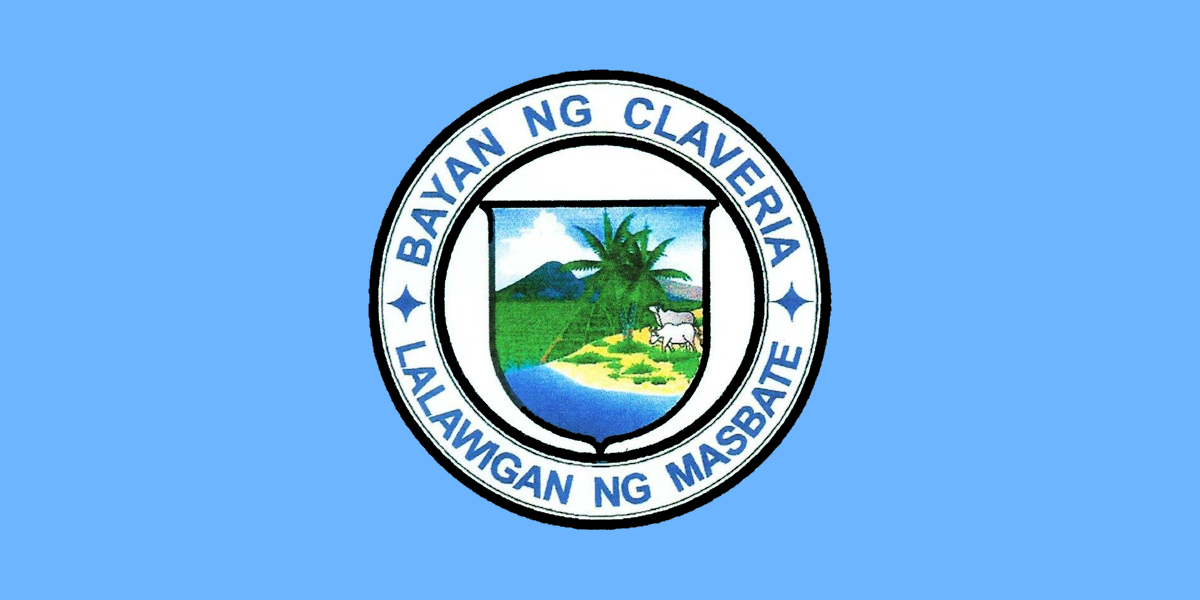
- Flag

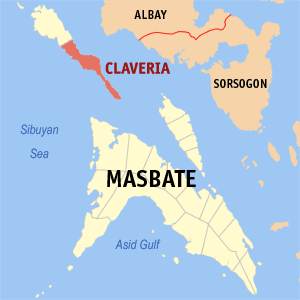
- Map of Masbate with Claveria highlighted
- Interactive map of Claveria
- Location within the Philippines
- Coordinates: 12°54′13″N 123°14′45″E
- Country: Philippines
- Region: Bicol Region
- Province: Masbate
- District: 1st district
- Founded: September 5, 1959
- Named for: Narciso Clavería y Zaldúa
- Barangays: 22 (see Barangays)

Government
  - Type: Sangguniang Bayan
  - Mayor: Karen M. Ballesteros
  - Vice Mayor: Vicente R. Sabaulan
  - Representative: Narciso Manuel R. Bravo Jr.
  - Municipal Council: Members: Karen M. Ballesteros; Oscar N. Albao; Cliff A. del Rosario; Narcisa L. Bentor; Arrjay G. Desamparado; Gladys M. Mahinay; Alfredo A. Mandal; Paulino B. Sandigan
  - Electorate: 26,425 voters (2025)

Area
  - Total: 182.98 km^{2} (70.65 sq mi)
- Elevation: 41 m (135 ft)
- Highest elevation: 425 m (1,394 ft)
- Lowest elevation: 0 m (0 ft)

Population (2024 census)
  - Total: 40,733
  - Density: 222.61/km^{2} (576.55/sq mi)
  - Households: 9,688

Economy
  - Income class: 1st municipal income class
  - Poverty incidence: 22.88% (2023)
  - Revenue: ₱ 210.4 million (2024)
  - Assets: ₱ 819.7 million (2024)
  - Expenditure: ₱ 147.9 million (2024)
  - Liabilities: ₱ 149.8 million (2024)

Service provider
  - Electricity: Masbate Electric Cooperative (MASELCO)
- Time zone: UTC+8 (PST)
- ZIP code: 5419
- PSGC: 0504107000
- IDD : area code: +63 (0)56
- Native languages: Masbateño; Tagalog

Claveria, officially the Municipality of Claveria (Masbatenyo: Banwa san Claveria; West Albay Bikol: Banwaan nin Claveria), is a municipality in the province of Masbate, Philippines. According to the 2024 census, it has a population of 40,733 people. Ranked 592nd among 1,488 municipalities in the Philippines.

It is located on the southern portion of Burias Island, 352 kilometers southeast of the nation's capital of Manila.

== Etymology ==
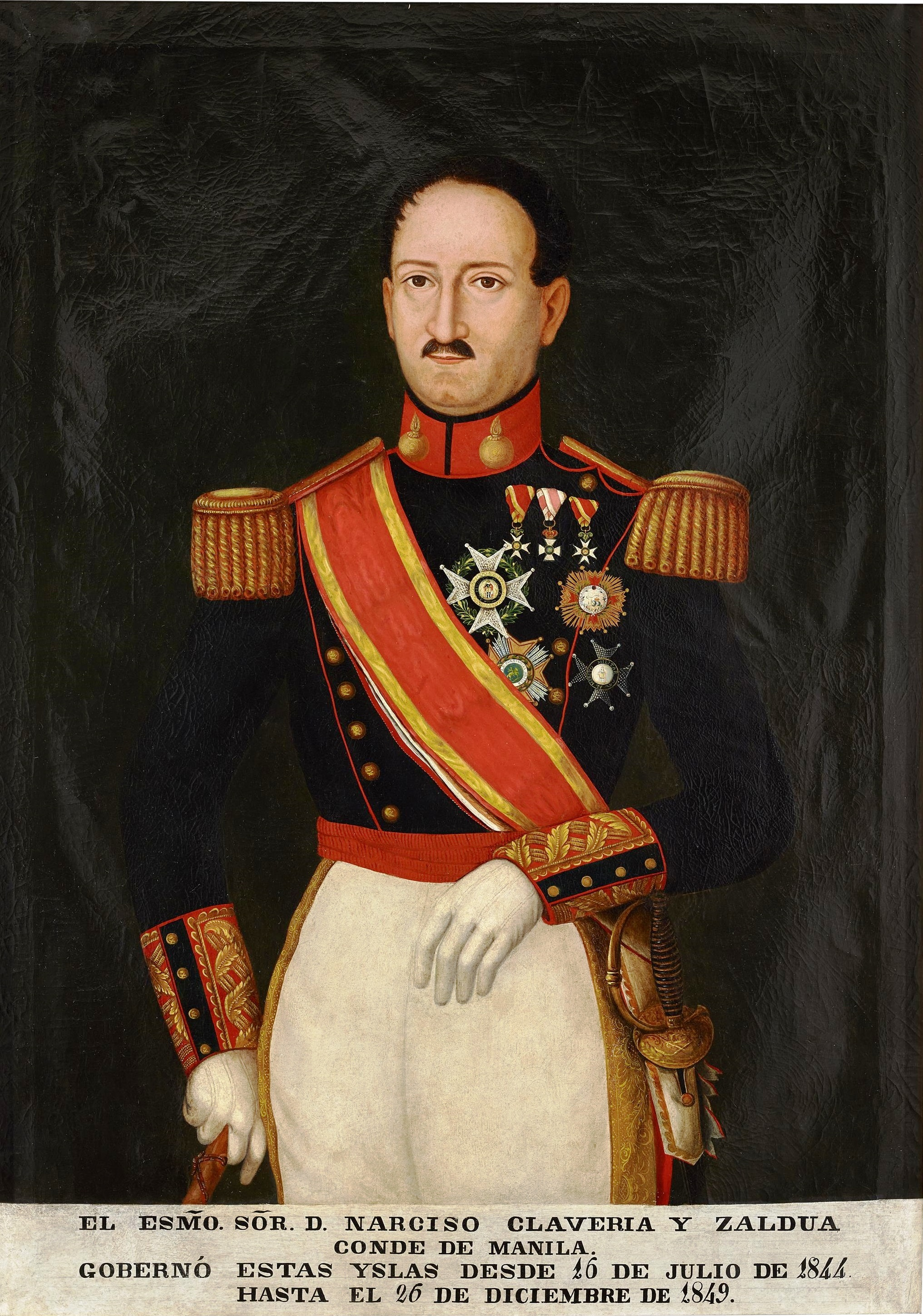
Portrait of the Spanish military and politician Narciso Clavería y Zaldúa (1795-1851), first count of Manila, lieutenant general of the Spanish army, and captain general.

The municipality was named after the Spanish governor-general Narciso Clavería y Zaldúa, who in 1844 anchored at Punduhan Paloha, the present site of Recodo (Poblacion District II), while in pursuit of Moro pirates, and named the place after himself.

== History ==
Bicolanos from Albay, Sorsogon and nearby provinces and Tagalogs from the Bondoc Peninsula are considered as the first settlers of Burias Island. Their original settlement, called Matandang Nayon ("Old Village"), was founded near the bank of the Siargao River.

In the 19th century, when the Spaniards were fighting the Moros in many parts of Mindanao, Burias Island became a refuge for retreating Moros due to its relatively isolated location and deep safe harbors. After Governor General Claveria's visit, it became the first sitio called “Visita”, a spanished term for visit.

In 1898 during the Philippine Revolution, Barrio Visita became a town and officially adopted the name Claveria, with Arcadio Sabaulan as Presidente Municipal. The first Justice of the Peace was Estanislao Abetria and the first priest was Padre Rebeya.

Three years later, in 1901, a cholera epidemic severely affected the municipality, resulting in a large population decrease. Consequently, the municipality was reverted to a barrio by virtue of a Municipal Council resolution, with Marcelo del Rosario as appointed Cabesa de Barangay.

In the middle of the 20th century, residents of Claveria began the initiative to reestablish Claveria into a municipality, especially spearheaded by Eleuterio C. Ombao, then head teacher of Claveria Elementary School. Despite strong opposition from the Municipal Council of San Pascual, Bill RA 2187 creating Claveria into a municipality was approved in the House of Representatives on May 7, 1959. September 5, 1959, was inauguration day, and Councilor Alfredo Alim was appointed Municipal mayor, also winning this position during the first local election in November of that year.

== Geography ==
=== Barangays ===
Claveria is politically subdivided into 22 barangays. Each barangay consists of puroks and some have sitios.

- Albasan
- Boca Engaño
- Buyo
- Calpi
- Canomay
- Cawayan
- Poblacion District I (Town Proper)
- Poblacion District II (Town Proper)
- Imelda
- Mababang Baybay
- Mabiton
- Manapao
- Nabasagan
- Nonoc
- Osmeña
- Pasig
- Peñafrancia
- Quezon
- San Isidro
- San Ramon
- San Vicente
- Taguilid

== Climate ==
Climate data for Claveria, Masbate
Month	Jan	Feb	Mar	Apr	May	Jun	Jul	Aug	Sep	Oct	Nov	Dec	Year
Mean daily maximum °C (°F)	27 (81)	28 (82)	29 (84)	31 (88)	31 (88)	31 (88)	30 (86)	29 (84)	29 (84)	29 (84)	29 (84)	28 (82)	29 (85)
Mean daily minimum °C (°F)	22 (72)	22 (72)	22 (72)	24 (75)	24 (75)	25 (77)	25 (77)	25 (77)	25 (77)	24 (75)	24 (75)	23 (73)	24 (75)
Average precipitation mm (inches)	55 (2.2)	36 (1.4)	45 (1.8)	42 (1.7)	114 (4.5)	184 (7.2)	245 (9.6)	224 (8.8)	238 (9.4)	171 (6.7)	130 (5.1)	94 (3.7)	1,578 (62.1)
Average rainy days	13.0	9.5	11.8	12.7	21.3	25.3	28.3	26.5	26.4	24.2	19.9	16.1	235
Source: Meteoblue

== Demographics ==
Population census of Claveria

Year	Pop.	±% p.a.
1903	875	—
1960	9,285	+4.23%
1970	29,459	+12.22%
1975	35,805	+3.99%
1980	37,685	+1.03%
1990	31,211	−1.87%
1995	35,648	+2.52%

Year	Pop.	±% p.a.
2000	38,398	+1.61%
2007	40,336	+0.68%
2010	41,572	+1.10%
2015	43,693	+0.95%
2020	42,142	−0.76%
2024	40,733	−0.81%

Source: Philippine Statistics Authority

In the 2024 census, the population of Claveria was 40,733 people, with a density of 220 inhabitants per square kilometre or 570 inhabitants per square mile.

== Economy ==
Poverty incidence of Claveria (%)

Source: Philippine Statistics Authority

== Education ==
There are two schools district offices which govern all educational institutions within the municipality. They oversee the management and operations of all private and public, from primary to secondary schools. These are the:

- Claveria North Schools District
- Claveria West Schools District

=== Primary and elementary schools ===
- Albasan Elementary School
- Arriesgado Elementary School
- Balete Elementary School
- Boca Engano Elementary School
- Bodega Elementary School
- Buyo Elementary School
- Calpi ELementary school
- Canomay ELementary school
- Cawayan ELementary school
- Claveria North Central School
- Curvada ELementary school
- Dapdap ELementary school
- Gaway-Gaway Elementary School
- Imelda Elementary School
- Mababangbaybay Elementary School
- Mabiton Elementary School
- Malacbalac ELementary school
- Madanlog Elementary School
- Manapao ELementary school
- Nabasagan ELementary school
- Nonoc Elementary School
- Osmena ELementary school
- Pasig ELementary school
- Peñafrancia ELementary school
- Quezon Elementary School
- Sampinitan ELementary school
- San Isidro ELementary school
- San Ramon Elementary School
- San Ramon SDA Multigrade School
- Santo Niño Elementary School
- Taguilid ELementary school

=== Secondary schools ===
- Cawayan National High School
- Felixberto Del Rosario, Jr. Memorial High School
- Mababangbaybay National High School
- Quezon National High School
- Osmeña High School
- San Isidro National High School
- San Ramon Institute
- Tiburcio A. Berdida Sr. National High School
- Tito R. Espinosa Memorial National Agricultural School
