= Ticao Pass =

Strait in the Philippines

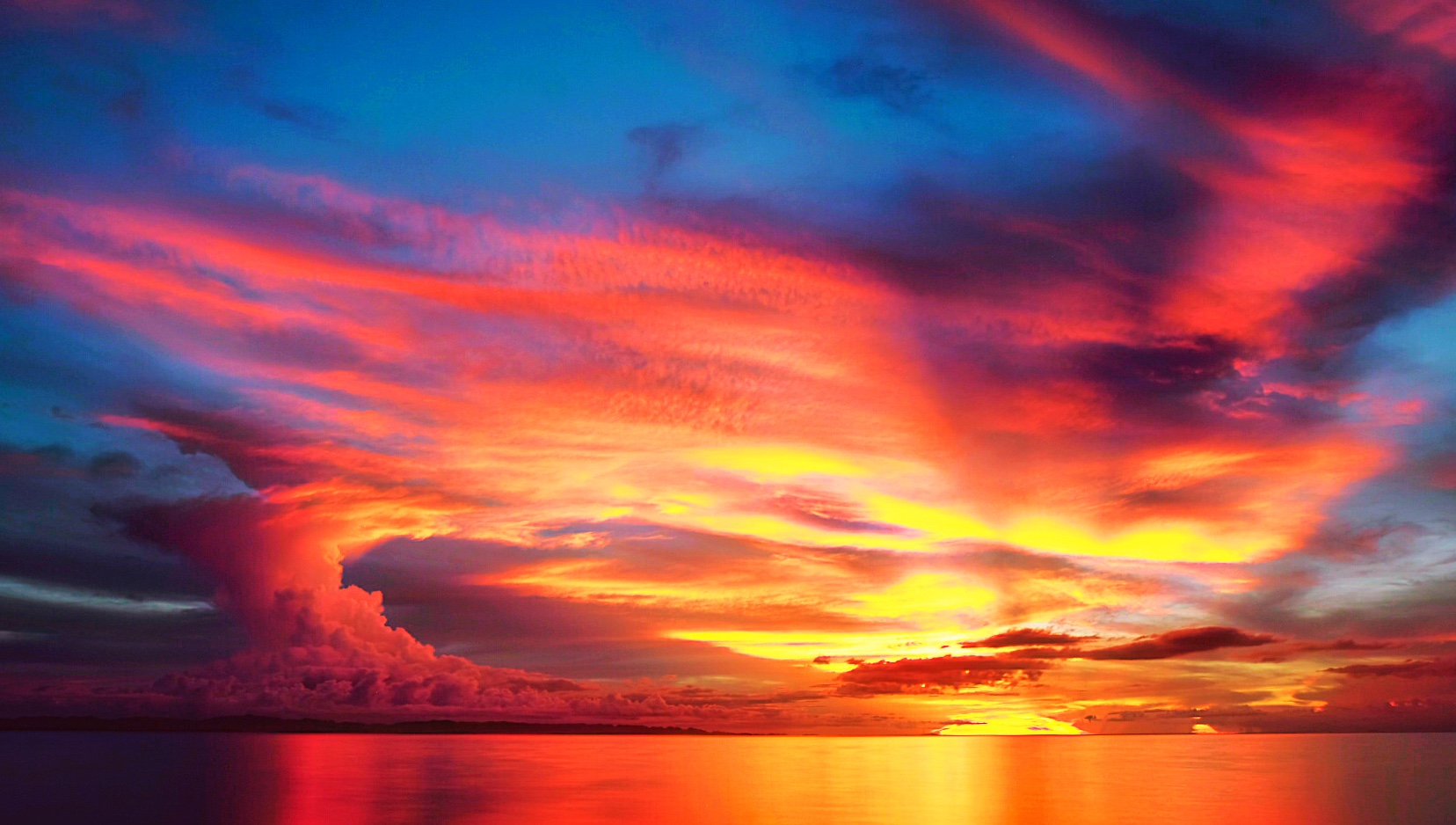
- Sunset at Ticao Pass as seen from Bulan, Sorsogon

- Location within the Philippines Ticao Pass (Philippines)
- Location: Bicol Peninsula; Ticao Island
- Coordinates: 12°37′N 123°48′E
- Type: strait
- Etymology: Ticao Island

Ticao Pass is the strait that separates Ticao Island from the Bicol Peninsula in the Philippines. It connects the Burias Pass in the north with the Samar Sea in the south.

Along with the Burias Pass, the waters of the Ticao Pass are proposed to become a Marine Protected Area. It is home to a large marine diversity, but it also suffers from massive overfishing and poaching, as well as destructive blast fishing.
