= Batuan, Masbate =

Municipality in Masbate, Philippines

Batuan
- Municipality
- Municipality of Batuan
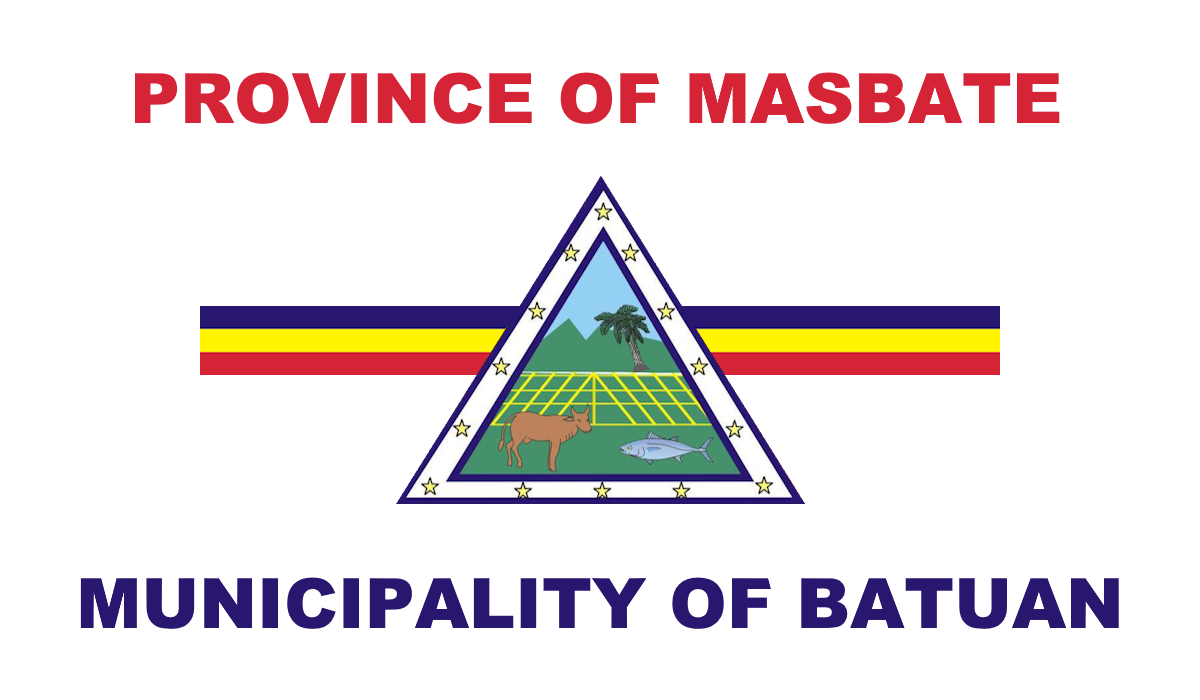
- Flag

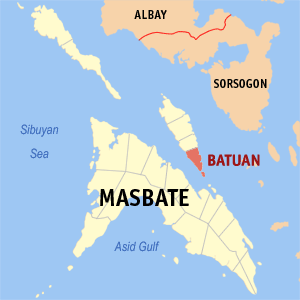
- Map of Masbate with Batuan highlighted
- Interactive map of Batuan
- Location within the Philippines
- Coordinates: 12°25′20″N 123°46′54″E
- Country: Philippines
- Region: Bicol Region
- Province: Masbate
- District: 1st district
- Founded: June 11, 1951
- Barangays: 14 (see Barangays)

Government
  - Type: Sangguniang Bayan
  - Mayor: Marco Martinez Cam
  - Vice Mayor: Charmax Jan Altarejos Yuson
  - Representative: Antonio T. Kho
  - Municipal Council: Members: Charlie R. Yuson II; Esteban S. Ballesteros; Junie M. Martinez; Emil Glenn A. Yuson; Jocelyn A. Lachica; Severino C. Alforte III; Virgilio A. Masdo Jr
  - Electorate: 10,931 voters (2025)

Area
  - Total: 56.28 km^{2} (21.73 sq mi)
- Elevation: 31 m (102 ft)
- Highest elevation: 240 m (790 ft)
- Lowest elevation: 0 m (0 ft)

Population (2024 census)
  - Total: 15,614
  - Density: 277.4/km^{2} (718.6/sq mi)
  - Households: 3,580

Economy
  - Income class: 4th municipal income class
  - Poverty incidence: 21.95% (2023)
  - Revenue: ₱ 102 million (2024)
  - Assets: ₱ 272 million (2024)
  - Expenditure: ₱ 90.29 million (2024)
  - Liabilities: ₱ 95.31 million (2024)

Service provider
  - Electricity: Ticao Island Electric Cooperative (TISELCO)
- Time zone: UTC+8 (PST)
- ZIP code: 5415
- PSGC: 0504104000
- IDD : area code: +63 (0)56
- Native languages: Masbateño; Tagalog

Batuan, officially the Municipality of Batuan, is a municipality in the province of Masbate, Philippines. According to the 2024 census, it has a population of 15,614 people.

The municipality is home to the Bongsanglay Natural Park.

== History ==
The history of the Municipality of Batuan can be traced back to the early part of the 18th century. The place was occupied by natives who engaged in trade with the Spanish colonizers. It is accessible for trading galleons because of the good bay, which provides a safe harbor for vessels. The place was originally known as Zaragosa, which was later changed to Lorcha, both patterned after the names of trading vessels of the Spaniards. In a misunderstanding that ensued, the natives decided to do away with everything Spanish, including the place's name.

Sometime in the Year 1887, a group of fishermen from neighboring areas docked on its shores due to bad weather conditions. Incidentally, while these fishermen were preparing food, they chanced upon a tree that bore an exuberant fruit and tasted sweet and sour. They later on discovered that this tree species grows abundantly locally known as “Batwan” tree. While they gathered fruit from this local tree species, a native armed with a bolo shouted at them and approached angrily, angry of their taking such precious “Batwan” fruit. Ever since, the place has been known as “Batuan” after the “Batwan” trees that grew in abundance therein.

The Municipality of Batuan as a settlement was then merely a Sitio of Barangay Buyo, a big barrio of the adjacent Municipality of San Fernando. The municipality was formally elevated to the status of a Town on June 11, 1952 by Republic Act 642.

== Geography ==
Batuan is located at the southern point of Ticao Island. It is the smallest municipality in Masbate, both in land area and population.

=== Barangays ===
Batuan is politically subdivided into 14 barangays. Each barangay consists of puroks and some have sitios.

- Burgos
- Cañares
- Canvañez
- Costa Rica
- Danao
- Gibraltar
- Mabuhay
- Matabao
- Nasandig
- Panisihan
- Poblacion
- Rizal
- Royroy
- Sawang

=== Climate ===
Climate data for Batuan, Masbate
| Month | Jan | Feb | Mar | Apr | May | Jun | Jul | Aug | Sep | Oct | Nov | Dec | Year |
|---|---|---|---|---|---|---|---|---|---|---|---|---|---|
| Mean daily maximum °C (°F) | 27 (81) | 28 (82) | 29 (84) | 31 (88) | 31 (88) | 30 (86) | 29 (84) | 29 (84) | 29 (84) | 29 (84) | 28 (82) | 28 (82) | 29 (84) |
| Mean daily minimum °C (°F) | 21 (70) | 21 (70) | 22 (72) | 22 (72) | 23 (73) | 24 (75) | 23 (73) | 23 (73) | 23 (73) | 23 (73) | 22 (72) | 22 (72) | 22 (72) |
| Average precipitation mm (inches) | 39 (1.5) | 34 (1.3) | 42 (1.7) | 36 (1.4) | 73 (2.9) | 109 (4.3) | 118 (4.6) | 108 (4.3) | 129 (5.1) | 136 (5.4) | 112 (4.4) | 89 (3.5) | 1,025 (40.4) |
| Average rainy days | 12.6 | 9.7 | 12.0 | 13.0 | 20.5 | 25.3 | 26.2 | 24.8 | 25.2 | 25.9 | 21.9 | 17.9 | 235 |
Source: Meteoblue

== Demographics ==
Population census of Batuan

| Year | Pop. | ±% p.a. |
|---|---|---|
| 1960 | 8,004 | — |
| 1970 | 9,939 | +2.19% |
| 1975 | 10,234 | +0.59% |
| 1980 | 10,406 | +0.33% |
| 1990 | 10,525 | +0.11% |
| 1995 | 12,705 | +3.59% |

| Year | Pop. | ±% p.a. |
|---|---|---|
| 2000 | 12,038 | −1.15% |
| 2007 | 12,585 | +0.61% |
| 2010 | 13,764 | +3.31% |
| 2015 | 15,086 | +1.76% |
| 2020 | 14,610 | −0.67% |
| 2024 | 15,614 | +1.61% |

Source: Philippine Statistics Authority

In the 2024 census, the population of Batuan was 15,614 people, with a density of 280 inhabitants per square kilometre or 730 inhabitants per square mile.

== Economy ==
Poverty incidence of Batuan

Source: Philippine Statistics Authority

== Archaeological and Ecological Landscape and Seascape of Ticao ==
The municipality is part of Ticao island, which is known as an archaeological landscape, possessing thousands of pre-colonial artifacts such as the Baybayin-inscribed Rizal Stone, Ticao gold spike teeth, Burial jars of varying designs and sizes, jade beads, human face rock statues, and the Ticao petrographs. Much of the homes in Ticao island use these archaeological finds to design their interiors. The island is also an ecological frontier for the conservation of manta rays. The island also possesses a 'rare subspecies' of Visayan warty pig, that is almost near extinction.

== Education ==
The Batuan Schools District Office governs all educational institutions within the municipality. It oversees the management and operations of all private and public, from primary to secondary schools.

=== Primary and elementary schools ===
- Batuan Central School
- Burgos Elementary School
- Cañares Elementary School
- Danao Elementary School
- Mabuhay Elementary School
- Matabao Elementary School
- Nasandig Elementary School
- Nazareth Institute of Alfonso
- Panisihan Elementary School
- Rizal Elementary School
- Royroy Elementary School
- Sawang Elementary School

=== Secondary schools ===
- Antonio Lee Llacer Sr. Integrated School
- Burgos National High School
- Costa Rica Integrated School
- F. Alindogan National High School

== Tourism ==
The municipality of Batuan is one of the four towns comprising the Ticao Island within the Masbate province. It is situated in the southern part of the Island. Batuan is the home of the Philippines' oldest and largest mangrove tree. Batuan is where untouched natural beauty meets rich cultural heritage, offering a tranquil escape in the heart of the Philippines. Tourism is an emerging sector in Batuan, Masbate here are the following tourism sites in the municipality of Batuan;

- Bongsanglay Natural Park-Bongsanglay Natural Park is a hidden gem in Ticao Island, where diverse wildlife and lush mangrove forests create a serene haven for nature lovers and adventurers alike. "It is the home of the Philippines' oldest and largest mangrove tree. Explore 1.5 km of trail surrounded by a century-old mangrove forest. Experience the underwater world by Snorkeling. By night, you can set up a camp surrounded by fireflies and experience one of the most beautiful shows in the World, The Bioluminescence.
- Tatus Island - The island is surrounded by pristine coral reefs and reef walls, which make the island the crown jewel among Batuan's stunning Dive Sites. The island has a Cave in its main entrance that leads to a lagoon, which is home to thousands of bats and sea snakes. The perfect blend of heart-pumping adventures and calming retreats awaits in Snake Island.
- Bongsanglay Beach - A pristine stretch of paradise on Ticao Island, where powdery white sands meet crystal-clear waters, offering a perfect escape for relaxation and adventure.
- Matabao Island - A serene tropical getaway in Ticao, where vibrant coral reefs, shipwrecks, clear waters, and unspoiled beaches and sandbars invite you to experience nature at its finest.
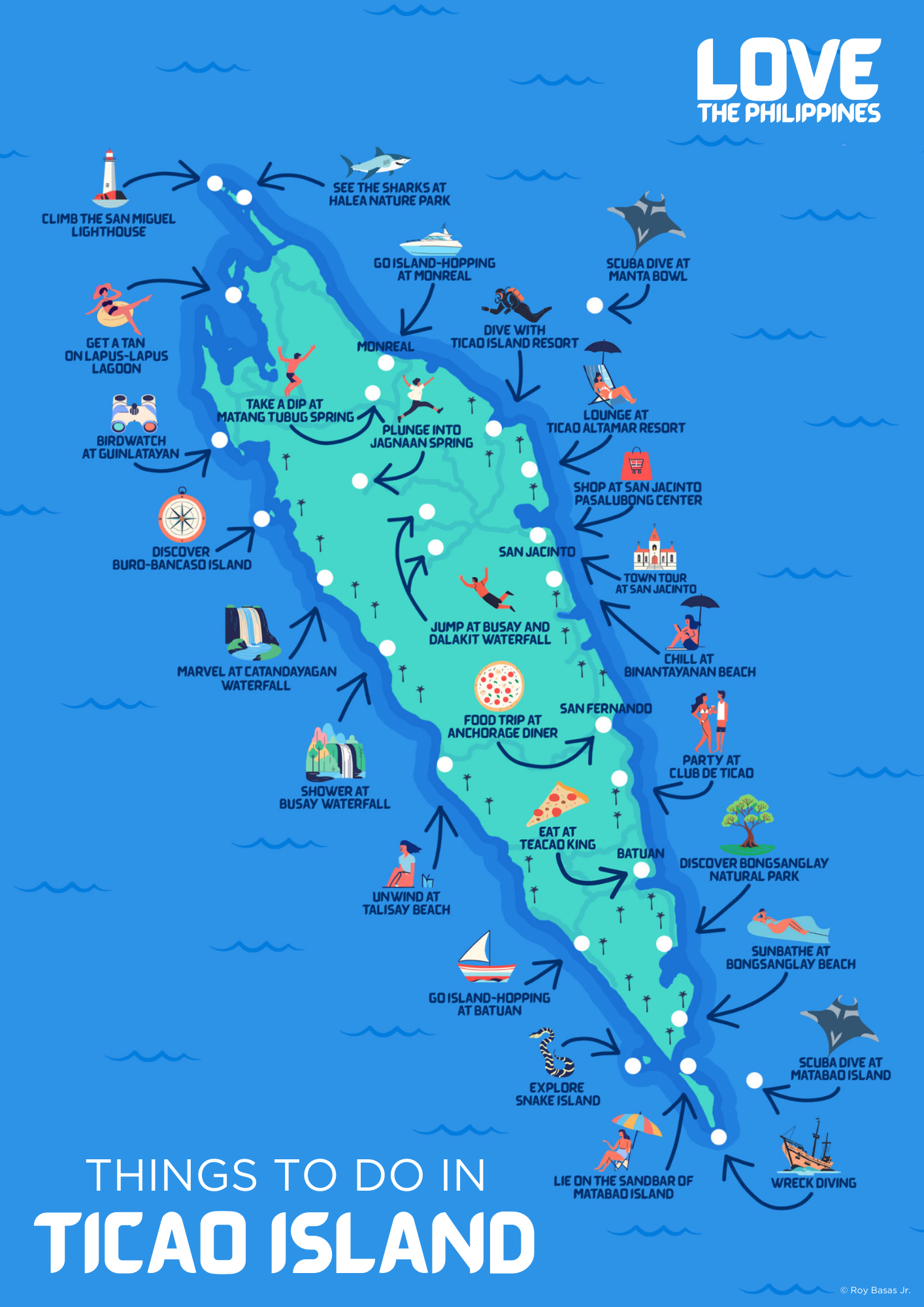
- Things to do in Ticao Island Map, The official tourism map of the Municipality of Batuan, Masbate by Roy Basas Jr, 2025.
  Matabao Island World War II Shipwreck - In Matabao Shipwreck, whether you are an Open Water Diver or advance, you can dive into the magnificent sights of Matabao shipwreck's historical and natural wonders. The shipwreck skeleton remains intact after it sank during World War II. The shipwreck serves as an underwater artificial reef that attracts fish and larger predators in the ocean. The wreck becomes the host of Coral Reefs and Fishes that have made it home.
