= Ticao Island =

Island in the Philippines

Ticao
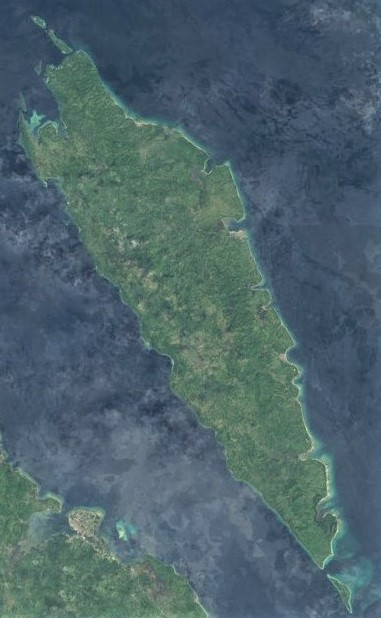
- Ticao island satellite image captured by Sentinel-2 in 2016

- Location within Philippines

Geography
- Coordinates: 12°31′45″N 123°41′53″E
- Adjacent to: Samar Sea; Sibuyan Sea; Sorsogon Bay; Ticao Pass
- Area: 334 km^{2} (129 sq mi)
- Highest elevation: 751 ft (228.9 m)
- Highest point: Mount Pandan

Administration
- Philippines
- Region: Bicol Region
- Province: Masbate
- Municipalities: Batuan; Monreal; San Fernando; San Jacinto

Demographics
- Population: 92,921 (2024)
- Ethnic groups: Masbateño, Waray

Additional information

Ticao Island is an island with a total land area of 334 km^{2} or 129 sq mi. It is one of the three major islands of Masbate province in the Philippines. It is separated from the Bicol Peninsula by the Ticao Pass. The other two major islands are Masbate Island (3,290 km^{2} or 1,270 sq mi) and Burias Island (424 km^{2} or 164 sq mi).

The island is divided into the municipalities of Batuan, Monreal, San Fernando and its mother-town, San Jacinto.

San Miguel Island is located "just off the northern tip" of Ticao Island. The year 1818 census shows that Ticao island had 266 native families and 8 Spanish-Filipino families.

== Archaeological and ecological landscape and seascape of Ticao ==
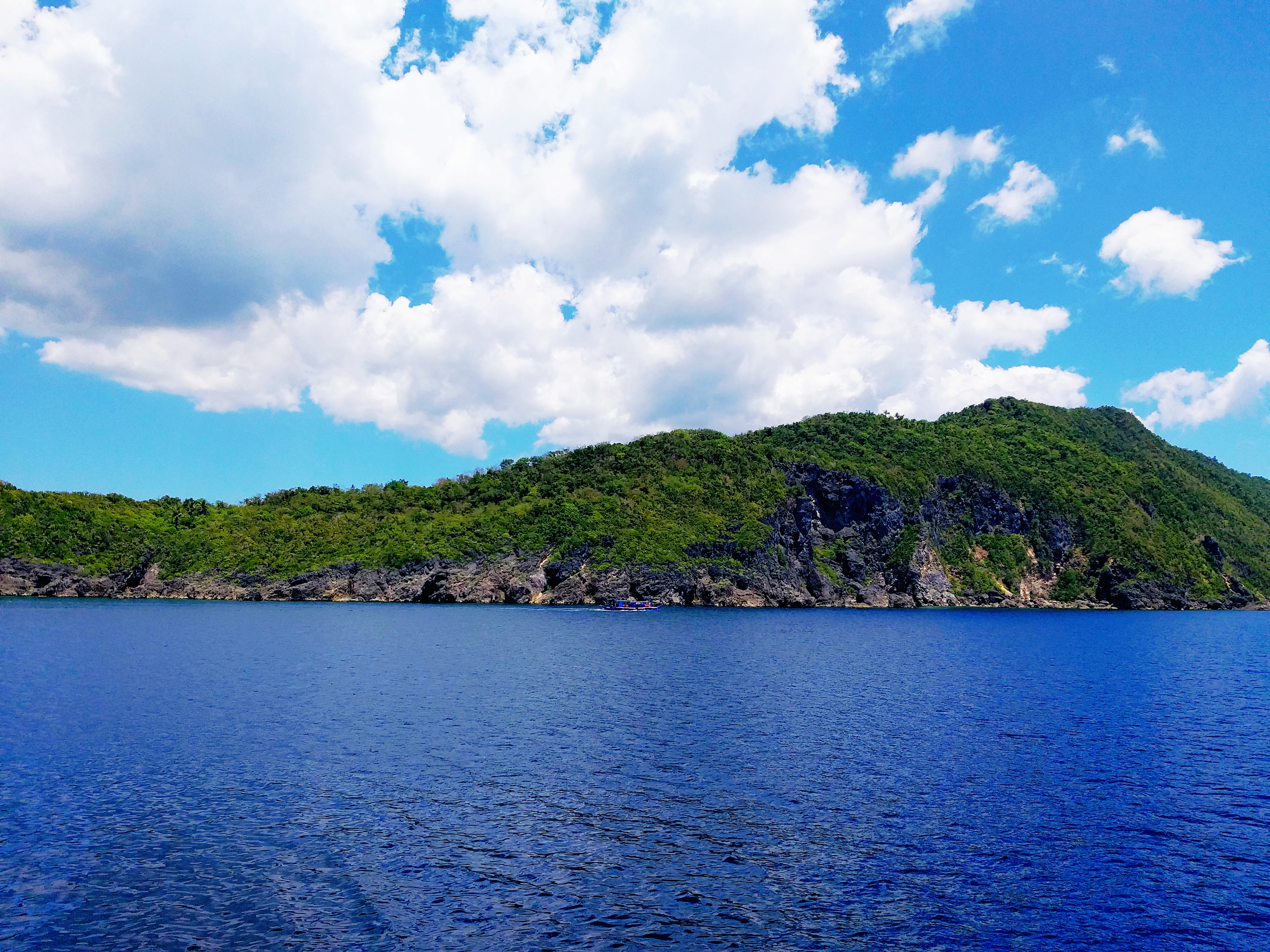
Isla Ticao iti Masbate

Ticao island is known as an archaeological landscape, possessing thousands of precolonial artifacts such as the Baybayin-inscribed Rizal Stone, Ticao gold spike teeth, burial jars of varying designs and sizes, jade beads, human face rock statues, and the Ticao petrographs. Much of the homes in Ticao island use these archaeological finds to design their interiors. The island is also an ecological frontier for the conservation of manta rays. The island also possesses a 'rare subspecies' of Visayan warty pig, that is almost near extinction. Penelopides panini ticaensis, or the Ticao hornbill, was a subspecies of the Visayan hornbill (Penelopides panini) known to occur only in Ticao Island. It is likely extinct in the island due to deforestation and habitat conversion.
