= 2022 Philippine local elections in the Bicol Region =

- May 9, 2022
- Gubernatorial elections
- 6 provincial governors and 1 city mayor
Party	Seats	+/–
NPC	2	+1
PDP–Laban	2	−2
Aksyon	1	New
KANP	1	New
Liberal	1	0
This lists parties that won seats. See the complete results below.
- Vice gubernatorial elections
- 6 provincial vice governors and 1 city vice mayor
Party	Seats	+/–
PDP–Laban	3	0
Liberal	2	+1
Aksyon	1	New
NPC	1	0
This lists parties that won seats. See the complete results below.
- Provincial Board elections
- 58 provincial board members and 10 city councilors
Party	Seats	+/–
PDP–Laban	26	+6
NPC	14	−2
Liberal	13	0
Lakas	5	+5
NUP	4	0
Nacionalista	2	−3
KANP	1	New
PROMDI	1	New
Reporma	1	New
Independent	1	−4
This lists parties that won seats. See the complete results below.

The 2022 Philippine local elections in the Bicol Region were held on May 9, 2022.

== Summary ==
=== Governors ===
Province/city	Incumbent	Incumbent's party	Winner	Winner's party	Winning margin
Albay	Al Francis Bichara	Nacionalista	Noel Rosal	KANP	32.28%
Camarines Norte	Edgar Tallado	PDP–Laban	Ricarte Padilla	Aksyon	4.51%
Camarines Sur	Miguel Luis Villafuerte	PDP–Laban	Luigi Villafuerte	PDP–Laban	8.17%
Catanduanes	Joseph Cua	NPC	Joseph Cua	NPC	31.77%
Masbate	Antonio Kho	PDP–Laban	Antonio Kho	PDP–Laban	15.04%
Naga (ICC)	Nelson Legacion	Liberal	Nelson Legacion	Liberal	11.86%
Sorsogon	Francis Escudero	NPC	Jose Edwin Hamor	NPC	46.97%

=== Vice governors ===
Province/city	Incumbent	Incumbent's party	Winner	Winner's party	Winning margin
Albay	Edcel Greco Lagman	Aksyon	Edcel Greco Lagman	Aksyon	49.18%
Camarines Norte	Vacant		Joseph Ascutia	Liberal	16.07%
Camarines Sur	Imelda Papin	PFP	Sal Fortuno Jr.	PDP–Laban	14.19%
Catanduanes	Shirley Abundo	Aksyon	Peter Cua	PDP–Laban	58.89%
Masbate	Ara Kho	PDP–Laban	Elisa Olga Kho	PDP–Laban	28.86%
Naga (ICC)	Nene de Asis	Liberal	Nene de Asis	Liberal	34.00%
Sorsogon	Wowo Fortes	NPC	Jun Escudero	NPC	64.82%

=== Provincial boards ===
Province/city	Seats	Party control		Composition
Province/city	Seats	Previous	Result	Composition
Albay	10 elected 3 ex-officio	No majority	No majority	Nacionalista (2); NUP (2); Liberal (2); PDP–Laban (1); Lakas (1); KNP (1); PROMDI (1)
Camarines Norte	10 elected 4 ex-officio	No majority	No majority	PDP–Laban (7); NUP (2); Liberal (1)
Camarines Sur	10 elected 3 ex-officio	No majority	PDP–Laban	PDP–Laban (7); NPC (3)
Catanduanes	8 elected 3 ex-officio	No majority	No majority	Lakas (4); PDP–Laban (1); NPC (1); Reporma (1); Independent (1)
Masbate	10 elected 3 ex-officio	No majority	PDP–Laban	PDP–Laban (10)
Naga (ICC)	10 elected 2 ex-officio	Liberal	Liberal	Liberal (10)
Sorsogon	10 elected 3 ex-officio	NPC	NPC	NPC (10)

== Albay ==
=== Governor ===
Incumbent Governor Al Francis Bichara of the Nacionalista Party ran for a third term. He was previously affiliated with PDP–Laban.

Bichara was defeated by Legazpi mayor Noel Rosal of Katipunan ng Nagkakaisang Pilipino. Two other candidates also ran for governor.

On September 19, 2022, the First Division of the Commission on Elections (COMELEC) disqualified Rosal over a spending ban violation. The COMELEC en banc upheld the disqualification on November 18.

Candidate	Party	Votes	%
Noel Rosal	Katipunan ng Nagkakaisang Pilipino	469,481	65.67
Al Francis Bichara (incumbent)	Nacionalista Party	238,746	33.39
Rodel Luna	Independent	4,421	0.62
Mar Bacuil	Independent	2,282	0.32
Total		714,930	100.00
Total votes		775,762	–
Registered voters/turnout		890,148	87.15
KANP gain from Nacionalista			
Source: Commission on Elections

=== Vice Governor ===
Incumbent Vice Governor Edcel Greco Lagman of Aksyon Demokratiko ran for a second term. He was previously affiliated with PDP–Laban.

Lagman won re-election against former Albay vice governor Harold Imperial (PROMDI).

Candidate	Party	Votes	%
Edcel Greco Lagman (incumbent)	Aksyon Demokratiko	463,879	74.59
Harold Imperial	PROMDI	158,022	25.41
Total		621,901	100.00
Total votes		775,762	–
Registered voters/turnout		890,148	87.15
Aksyon hold			
Source: Commission on Elections

=== Provincial Board ===
The Albay Provincial Board is composed of 13 board members, 10 of whom are elected.

The Nacionalista Party tied with the National Unity Party and the Liberal Party at two seats each.

Party	Votes	%	Seats	+/–
Nacionalista Party	326,119	20.77	2	New
National Unity Party	247,241	15.75	2	New
Liberal Party	236,490	15.06	2	–1
PDP–Laban	218,936	13.94	1	–4
Lakas–CMD	115,264	7.34	1	New
Katipunan ng Nagkakaisang Pilipino	111,065	7.07	1	New
PROMDI	108,673	6.92	1	New
Independent	206,492	13.15	0	–1
Total	1,570,280	100.00	10	0
Total votes	775,762	–		
Registered voters/turnout	890,148	87.15		

==== 1st district ====
Albay's 1st provincial district consists of the same area as Albay's 1st legislative district. Three board members are elected from this provincial district.

Four candidates were included in the ballot.

Candidate	Party	Votes	%
Glenda Bongao (incumbent)	Liberal Party	119,004	32.47
Rey Bragais (incumbent)	Liberal Party	117,486	32.06
Victor Ziga Jr. (incumbent)	Lakas–CMD	115,264	31.45
Denniesiano Borjal	Independent	14,736	4.02
Total		366,490	100.00
Total votes		228,183	–
Registered voters/turnout		265,019	86.10
Source: Commission on Elections

==== 2nd district ====
Albay's 2nd provincial district consists of the same area as Albay's 2nd legislative district. Three board members are elected from this provincial district.

Six candidates were included in the ballot.

Candidate	Party	Votes	%
Vince Baltazar	PDP–Laban	129,489	22.48
Melissa Abadeza (incumbent)	Nacionalista Party	115,610	20.07
Rolly Rosal (incumbent)	Katipunan ng Nagkakaisang Pilipino	111,065	19.29
Neil Montallana (incumbent)	PDP–Laban	89,447	15.53
Junzagitsit Alegre	Independent	83,547	14.51
Fernand Imperial	Nacionalista Party	46,734	8.12
Total		575,892	100.00
Total votes		270,007	–
Registered voters/turnout		300,750	89.78
Source: Commission on Elections

==== 3rd district ====
Albay's 3rd provincial district consists of the same area as Albay's 3rd legislative district. Four board members are elected from this provincial district.

Seven candidates were included in the ballot.

Candidate	Party	Votes	%
Jesap Salceda (incumbent)	National Unity Party	138,555	22.07
Jacem Palmiano	National Unity Party	108,686	17.31
Dante Arandia (incumbent)	PROMDI	108,673	17.31
Eva Josephine Ribaya (incumbent)	Nacionalista Party	106,406	16.95
Pem Imperial	Independent	97,569	15.54
Herbert Borja	Nacionalista Party	57,369	9.14
Ga Lonzaga	Independent	10,640	1.69
Total		627,898	100.00
Total votes		277,572	–
Registered voters/turnout		324,379	85.57
Source: Commission on Elections

== Camarines Norte ==
=== Governor ===
Incumbent Governor Edgar Tallado of PDP–Laban ran for a second term.

Tallado was defeated by former Jose Panganiban mayor Ricarte Padilla of Aksyon Demokratiko. Two other candidates also ran for governor.

Candidate	Party	Votes	%
Ricarte Padilla	Aksyon Demokratiko	162,081	51.84
Edgar Tallado (incumbent)	PDP–Laban	147,985	47.33
BP Balmeo	Independent	1,417	0.45
John Rom	Partido Pederal ng Maharlika	1,199	0.38
Total		312,682	100.00
Total votes		334,987	–
Registered voters/turnout		384,871	87.04
Aksyon gain from PDP–Laban			
Source: Commission on Elections

=== Vice Governor ===
Acting Vice Governor Concon Panotes of PDP–Laban ran for the Camarines Norte Provincial Board in the 2nd provincial district.

PDP–Laban nominated former Camarines Norte vice governor Jonah Pimentel, who was defeated by Joseph Ascutia of the Liberal Party. Elmerando Alberto (Independent) also ran for vice governor.

Candidate	Party	Votes	%
Joseph Ascutia	Liberal Party	168,782	57.65
Jonah Pimentel	PDP–Laban	121,716	41.58
Elmerando Alberto	Independent	2,251	0.77
Total		292,749	100.00
Total votes		334,987	–
Registered voters/turnout		384,871	87.04
Liberal gain from PDP–Laban			
Source: Commission on Elections

=== Provincial Board ===
The Camarines Norte Provincial Board is composed of 14 board members, 10 of whom are elected.

PDP–Laban won seven seats, remaining as the largest party in the provincial board.

Party	Votes	%	Seats	+/–
PDP–Laban	635,197	58.17	7	0
Liberal Party	184,227	16.87	1	New
National Unity Party	113,191	10.37	2	–1
Lakas–CMD	86,090	7.88	0	New
Aksyon Demokratiko	34,013	3.11	0	New
Independent	39,317	3.60	0	0
Total	1,092,035	100.00	10	0
Total votes	334,987	–		
Registered voters/turnout	384,871	87.04		

==== 1st district ====
Camarines Norte's 1st provincial district consists of the same area as Camarines Norte's 1st legislative district. Five board members are elected from this provincial district.

19 candidates were included in the ballot.

Candidate	Party	Votes	%
Artemio Serdon Jr. (incumbent)	PDP–Laban	78,249	14.06
Lukad de Lima	Liberal Party	66,783	12.00
Winnie Oco	National Unity Party	57,753	10.37
Teresita Malubay	National Unity Party	55,438	9.96
Muriel Pandi	PDP–Laban	53,661	9.64
Evaristo Andaya	Liberal Party	51,438	9.24
Aida Dasco (incumbent)	PDP–Laban	50,879	9.14
Nestor Manarang	PDP–Laban	46,176	8.29
Ramil Lagamayo	PDP–Laban	43,065	7.74
Serafin Dasco	Aksyon Demokratiko	34,013	6.11
Roger Data	Independent	9,437	1.70
Bobby Pamor	Independent	6,236	1.12
Maria Cecilia Pedir	Independent	3,596	0.65
Total		556,724	100.00
Total votes		166,388	–
Registered voters/turnout		192,328	86.51
Source: Commission on Elections

==== 2nd district ====
Camarines Norte's 2nd provincial district consists of the same area as Camarines Norte's 2nd legislative district. Five board members are elected from this provincial district.

10 candidates were included in the ballot.

Candidate	Party	Votes	%
Concon Panotes (incumbent)	PDP–Laban	90,140	16.84
Atoy Moreno (incumbent)	PDP–Laban	75,108	14.03
Joseph Stanley Alegre (incumbent)	PDP–Laban	71,859	13.42
Pol Gache	PDP–Laban	63,525	11.87
Gerry Quiñones	PDP–Laban	62,535	11.68
Ronnie Samonte	Lakas–CMD	52,446	9.80
Jerome Obusan	Liberal Party	37,018	6.92
Noel Pardo	Lakas–CMD	33,644	6.28
Jonalyn Ang	Liberal Party	28,988	5.42
Jane Carlo Madamba	Independent	20,048	3.75
Total		535,311	100.00
Total votes		168,599	–
Registered voters/turnout		192,543	87.56
Source: Commission on Elections

== Camarines Sur ==
=== Governor ===
Term-limited incumbent Governor Miguel Luis Villafuerte of PDP–Laban ran for the House of Representatives in Camarines Sur's 5th legislative district.

PDP–Laban nominated Villafuerte's brother, Luigi Villafuerte, who won the election against former representative Rolando Andaya Jr. (Nationalist People's Coalition), Camarines Sur vice governor Imelda Papin (Partido Federal ng Pilipinas) and two other candidates.

Candidate	Party	Votes	%
Luigi Villafuerte	PDP–Laban	492,415	52.92
Rolando Andaya Jr.	Nationalist People's Coalition	416,434	44.75
Imelda Papin	Partido Federal ng Pilipinas	13,699	1.47
Richard Cabal	Independent	4,208	0.45
Ireneo Bongat Jr.	Independent	3,744	0.40
Total		930,500	100.00
Total votes		1,020,821	–
Registered voters/turnout		1,190,072	85.78
PDP–Laban hold			
Source: Commission on Elections

=== Vice Governor ===
Incumbent Vice Governor Imelda Papin of the Partido Federal ng Pilipinas ran for a second term. She was previously affiliated with PDP–Laban.

Sal Fortuno Jr. (PDP–Laban) won the election against provincial board member JJ Pilapil (Nationalist People's Coalition) and two other candidates.

Candidate	Party	Votes	%
Sal Fortuno Jr.	PDP–Laban	423,584	52.07
JJ Pilapil	Nationalist People's Coalition	308,190	37.88
Son Julia	Independent	69,974	8.60
Romeo Nacario	Independent	11,806	1.45
Total		813,554	100.00
Total votes		1,020,821	–
Registered voters/turnout		1,190,072	85.78
PDP–Laban gain from PFP			
Source: Commission on Elections

=== Provincial Board ===
The Camarines Sur Provincial Board is composed of 13 board members, 10 of whom are elected.

The PDP–Laban won seven seats, gaining a majority in the provincial board.

Party	Votes	%	Seats	+/–
PDP–Laban	822,779	56.55	7	+7
Nationalist People's Coalition	593,540	40.79	3	–1
Kilusang Bagong Lipunan	24,151	1.66	0	New
Partido Federal ng Pilipinas	10,251	0.70	0	New
Katipunan ng Kamalayang Kayumanggi	4,249	0.29	0	New
Total	1,454,970	100.00	10	0
Total votes	1,020,821	–		
Registered voters/turnout	1,190,072	85.78		

==== 1st district ====
Camarines Sur's 1st provincial district consists of the same area as Camarines Sur's 1st legislative district. One board member is elected from this provincial district.

Two candidates were included in the ballot.

Candidate	Party	Votes	%
Warren Señar	PDP–Laban	49,837	50.99
Trixie Clemente-Maquiling (incumbent)	Nationalist People's Coalition	47,893	49.01
Total		97,730	100.00
Total votes		118,004	–
Registered voters/turnout		136,519	86.44
Source: Commission on Elections

==== 2nd district ====
Camarines Sur's 2nd provincial district consists of the same area as Camarines Sur's 2nd legislative district. Two board members are elected from this provincial district.

Five candidates were included in the ballot.

Candidate	Party	Votes	%
Niño Tayco	PDP–Laban	105,555	40.13
Romulo Hernandez (incumbent)	PDP–Laban	89,279	33.94
Ariel Oriño	Nationalist People's Coalition	37,639	14.31
Jaime Cacatian	Nationalist People's Coalition	26,296	10.00
Jezz Caceres	Katipunan ng Kamalayang Kayumanggi	4,249	1.62
Total		263,018	100.00
Total votes		186,437	–
Registered voters/turnout		217,470	85.73
Source: Commission on Elections

==== 3rd district ====
Camarines Sur's 3rd provincial district consists of the same area as Camarines Sur's 3rd legislative district, excluding the city of Naga. Two board members are elected from this provincial district.

Five candidates were included in the ballot.

Candidate	Party	Votes	%
Vanessa Señar	Nationalist People's Coalition	71,140	33.68
Pol Rapado Manaog	PDP–Laban	56,085	26.55
Grace Simando	PDP–Laban	49,584	23.48
Charina Pante	Kilusang Bagong Lipunan	24,151	11.43
Aileen Papin	Partido Federal ng Pilipinas	10,251	4.85
Total		211,211	100.00
Total votes		183,985	–
Registered voters/turnout		218,561	84.18
Source: Commission on Elections

==== 4th district ====
Camarines Sur's 4th provincial district consists of the same area as Camarines Sur's 4th legislative district. Two board members are elected from this provincial district.

Four candidates were included in the ballot.

Candidate	Party	Votes	%
Eugene Fuentebella	Nationalist People's Coalition	113,774	32.90
Awel Llaguno	Nationalist People's Coalition	87,142	25.20
Maymay Pacamarra	PDP–Laban	75,599	21.86
Belle Prades	PDP–Laban	69,323	20.04
Total		345,838	100.00
Total votes		258,484	–
Registered voters/turnout		300,303	86.07
Source: Commission on Elections

==== 5th district ====
Camarines Sur's 5th provincial district consists of the same area as Camarines Sur's 5th legislative district. Three board members are elected from this provincial district.

Six candidates were included in the ballot.

Candidate	Party	Votes	%
Donna Oñate	PDP–Laban	112,820	21.00
Wilfredo Julio Oliva (incumbent)	PDP–Laban	108,267	20.15
Shai Noble	PDP–Laban	106,430	19.81
Ruperto Alfelor (incumbent)	Nationalist People's Coalition	81,832	15.23
Dante Oliva	Nationalist People's Coalition	69,914	13.02
Marie Cuadrante	Nationalist People's Coalition	57,910	10.78
Total		537,173	100.00
Total votes		273,911	–
Registered voters/turnout		317,219	86.35
Source: Commission on Elections

== Catanduanes ==
=== Governor ===
Incumbent Governor Joseph Cua of the Nationalist People's Coalition ran for a third term. He was previously affiliated with the United Nationalist Alliance.

Cua won re-election against Catanduanes vice governor Shirley Abundo (Aksyon Demokratiko) and Balbas Tanael (Independent).

Candidate	Party	Votes	%
Joseph Cua (incumbent)	Nationalist People's Coalition	101,838	64.87
Shirley Abundo	Aksyon Demokratiko	51,967	33.10
Balbas Tanael	Independent	3,192	2.03
Total		156,997	100.00
Total votes		173,597	–
Registered voters/turnout		198,872	87.29
NPC hold			
Source: Commission on Elections

=== Vice Governor ===
Incumbent Vice Governor Shirley Abundo of Aksyon Demokratiko ran for governor of Catanduanes. He was previously affiliated with the Partido Federal ng Pilipinas.

Aksyon Demokratiko nominated provincial board member Natalio Popa Jr., who was defeated by San Andres mayor Peter Cua of PDP–Laban. Odel Abichuela (Independent) also ran for vice governor.

Candidate	Party	Votes	%
Peter Cua	PDP–Laban	110,049	75.85
Natalio Popa Jr.	Aksyon Demokratiko	24,611	16.96
Odel Abichuela	Independent	10,433	7.19
Total		145,093	100.00
Total votes		173,597	–
Registered voters/turnout		198,872	87.29
PDP–Laban gain from Aksyon			
Source: Commission on Elections

=== Provincial Board ===
The Catanduanes Provincial Board is composed of 11 board members, eight of whom are elected.

Lakas–CMD won four seats, becoming the largest party in the provincial board.

Party	Votes	%	Seats	+/–
Lakas–CMD	132,084	27.62	4	+4
PDP–Laban	62,194	13.00	1	0
Nationalist People's Coalition	38,237	7.99	1	–2
Partido para sa Demokratikong Reporma	32,679	6.83	1	New
Kusog Bikolandia	13,693	2.86	0	New
Independent	199,417	41.69	1	0
Total	478,304	100.00	8	0
Total votes	173,597	–		
Registered voters/turnout	198,872	87.29		

==== 1st district ====
Catanduanes' 1st provincial district consists of the municipalities of Caramoran, San Andres and Virac. Five board members are elected from this district.

Nine candidates were included in the ballot.

Candidate	Party	Votes	%
Jan Alberto	Independent	51,711	20.16
Santos Zafe (incumbent)	Lakas–CMD	39,830	15.53
Raffy Zuniega (incumbent)	Nationalist People's Coalition	38,237	14.91
Sonny Francisco	Lakas–CMD	37,376	14.57
Fred Gianan	PDP–Laban	30,438	11.87
Alan del Valle	Independent	27,676	10.79
Pao Araojo	Independent	14,331	5.59
Jinky Alberto Tabor	Kusog Bikolandia	13,693	5.34
Dave Templonuevo	Independent	3,168	1.24
Total		256,460	100.00
Total votes		89,523	–
Registered voters/turnout		101,627	88.09
Source: Commission on Elections

==== 2nd district ====
Catanduanes' 2nd provincial district consists of the municipalities of Bagamanoc, Baras, Bato, Gigmoto, Pandan, Panganiban, San Miguel and Viga. Five board members are elected from this district.

12 candidates were included in the ballot.

Candidate	Party	Votes	%
Obet Fernadez (incumbent)	Partido para sa Demokratikong Reporma	32,679	14.73
Boy Balidoy	PDP–Laban	31,756	14.31
Dean Vergara	Lakas–CMD	28,942	13.05
Edwin Tanael (incumbent)	Lakas–CMD	25,936	11.69
Nilo Sanchez	Independent	25,878	11.66
Gil Templonuevo Jr.	Independent	18,992	8.56
Domingo Prensader	Independent	13,343	6.01
Amelia Chantengco	Independent	13,107	5.91
Lito Teves	Independent	12,533	5.65
Cesar Vitalicio	Independent	11,038	4.98
Rafael Buendia	Independent	6,005	2.71
Jacinto Obre	Independent	1,635	0.74
Total		221,844	100.00
Total votes		84,074	–
Registered voters/turnout		97,245	86.46
Source: Commission on Elections

== Masbate ==
=== Governor ===
Incumbent Governor Antonio Kho of PDP–Laban ran for a third term.

Kho won re-election against representative Narciso Bravo Jr. (National Unity Party).

Candidate	Party	Votes	%
Antonio Kho (incumbent)	PDP–Laban	250,493	57.52
Narciso Bravo Jr.	National Unity Party	185,001	42.48
Total		435,494	100.00
Total votes		492,707	–
Registered voters/turnout		590,735	83.41
PDP–Laban hold			
Source: Commission on Elections

=== Vice Governor ===
Incumbent Olga "Ara" Kho of PDP–Laban ran for the House of Representatives in Masbate's 2nd legislative district.

PDP–Laban nominated Kho's mother, representative Elisa Olga Kho, who won the election against Jesi Howard Lanete (National Unity Party).

Candidate	Party	Votes	%
Elisa Olga Kho	PDP–Laban	251,229	64.43
Jesi Howard Lanete	National Unity Party	138,689	35.57
Total		389,918	100.00
Total votes		492,707	–
Registered voters/turnout		590,735	83.41
PDP–Laban hold			
Source: Commission on Elections

=== Provincial Board ===
The Masbate Provincial Board is composed of 13 board members, 10 of whom are elected.

PDP–Laban won 10 seats, gaining a majority in the provincial board.

Party	Votes	%	Seats	+/–
PDP–Laban	713,164	81.29	10	+4
National Unity Party	94,726	10.80	0	–1
Nationalist People's Coalition	34,153	3.89	0	–1
Independent	35,313	4.02	0	–1
Total	877,356	100.00	10	0
Total votes	492,707	–		
Registered voters/turnout	590,735	83.41		

==== 1st district ====
Masbate's 1st provincial district consists of the same area as Masbate's 1st legislative district. Two board members are elected from this provincial district.

Four candidates were included in the ballot.

Candidate	Party	Votes	%
Alfredo Alim Jr.	PDP–Laban	45,309	33.06
Nonong Cantela	PDP–Laban	35,443	25.86
Bok Barsaga (incumbent)	National Unity Party	33,865	24.71
Elias Mahinay	National Unity Party	22,454	16.38
Total		137,071	100.00
Total votes		105,702	–
Registered voters/turnout		122,539	86.26
Source: Commission on Elections

==== 2nd district ====
Masbate's 2nd provincial district consists of the same area as Masbate's 2nd legislative district. Four board members are elected from this provincial district.

Five candidates were included in the ballot.

Candidate	Party	Votes	%
Tata Nono Amante	PDP–Laban	103,076	24.64
Tata Danao (incumbent)	PDP–Laban	99,758	23.85
Allan Cos (incumbent)	PDP–Laban	88,730	21.21
Kris Espinosa (incumbent)	PDP–Laban	88,278	21.11
Sherman Valera	National Unity Party	38,407	9.18
Total		418,249	100.00
Total votes		208,126	–
Registered voters/turnout		252,110	82.55
Source: Commission on Elections

==== 3rd district ====
Masbate's 3rd provincial district consists of the same area as Masbate's 3rd legislative district. Four board members are elected from this provincial district.

Six candidates were included in the ballot.

Candidate	Party	Votes	%
Bong Gonzales (incumbent)	PDP–Laban	77,967	24.21
Rudy Alvarez Jr. (incumbent)	PDP–Laban	63,605	19.75
Nene Aguilar-Tinegra	PDP–Laban	61,845	19.20
Allan Lepasana	PDP–Laban	49,153	15.26
Boy Arregadas	Independent	35,313	10.97
Albert Chu	Nationalist People's Coalition	34,153	10.61
Total		322,036	100.00
Total votes		178,879	–
Registered voters/turnout		216,086	82.78
Source: Commission on Elections

== Naga ==
=== Mayor ===
Incumbent Mayor Nelson Legacion of the Liberal Party ran for a second term.

Legacion won re-election against four other candidates.

Candidate	Party	Votes	%
Nelson Legacion (incumbent)	Liberal Party	41,606	42.98
Tato Mendoza	Independent	30,124	31.12
John Bongat	Independent	24,748	25.57
Ferdinand San Joaquin	Independent	209	0.22
Manny Morano	Independent	109	0.11
Total		96,796	100.00
Total votes		100,047	–
Registered voters/turnout		117,481	85.16
Liberal hold			
Source: Commission on Elections

=== Vice Mayor ===
Incumbent Vice Mayor Nene de Asis of the Liberal Party ran for a second term.

De Asis won re-election against four other candidates.

Candidate	Party	Votes	%
Nene de Asis (incumbent)	Liberal Party	49,978	56.21
Toots de Quiros	Independent	19,746	22.21
Zenaida Bragais	Independent	18,140	20.40
Mulo Portes	Independent	584	0.66
Dano Obelidor	Independent	459	0.52
Total		88,907	100.00
Total votes		100,047	–
Registered voters/turnout		117,481	85.16
Liberal hold			
Source: Commission on Elections

=== City Council ===
The Naga City Council is composed of 12 councilors, 10 of whom are elected.

43 candidates were included in the ballot.

The Liberal Party won 10 seats, maintaining its majority in the city council.

Party	Votes	%	Seats	+/–
Liberal Party	389,581	59.53	10	+1
Independent	264,812	40.47	0	–1
Total	654,393	100.00	10	0
Total votes	100,047	–		
Registered voters/turnout	117,481	85.16		

Candidate	Party	Votes	%
Jess Albeus (incumbent)	Liberal Party	53,802	8.22
Lito del Rosario (incumbent)	Liberal Party	45,419	6.94
Oying Rosales	Liberal Party	44,596	6.81
Brad-Omar Buenafe	Liberal Party	40,842	6.24
Gayle Abonal-Gomez	Liberal Party	39,242	6.00
Vidal Castillo (incumbent)	Liberal Party	36,584	5.59
Sonny Rañola (incumbent)	Liberal Party	36,430	5.57
Joeper Perez (incumbent)	Liberal Party	31,521	4.82
Badong del Castillo	Liberal Party	30,840	4.71
Dodit Beltran	Liberal Party	30,305	4.63
Nathan Sergio	Independent	23,852	3.64
Areiz Macaraig	Independent	19,428	2.97
Jude Diokno	Independent	16,451	2.51
Simeon Adan	Independent	16,398	2.51
Boboy Salva	Independent	14,631	2.24
Nono Salak	Independent	11,371	1.74
Allan San Juan	Independent	10,536	1.61
Mico Pielago	Independent	10,431	1.59
Gina Albao	Independent	9,929	1.52
Mon Sales	Independent	9,404	1.44
Ed Gregorio	Independent	9,267	1.42
Enzo Narvaez	Independent	8,917	1.36
Mons Baturiano	Independent	8,699	1.33
Jhessa Ador	Independent	8,498	1.30
Art Tuy	Independent	7,450	1.14
Raymond Pascual	Independent	7,307	1.12
Joco Celebrado	Independent	7,152	1.09
Jayr Mendoza	Independent	6,924	1.06
Ricardo Mariano	Independent	6,587	1.01
Pogi Belen	Independent	6,463	0.99
Johnroey Alferez	Independent	5,419	0.83
Junjie Abella	Independent	4,734	0.72
Khian Jamer	Independent	4,569	0.70
Marlon Nasol	Independent	4,557	0.70
Gem Moso	Independent	4,140	0.63
Fran Calleja	Independent	3,908	0.60
Ambet Portillo	Independent	3,535	0.54
Charles Paloma	Independent	3,213	0.49
Maureen Mallari	Independent	3,024	0.46
Sheryl Fausto	Independent	2,423	0.37
July Catimbang	Independent	2,085	0.32
Bentoy Rosell	Independent	1,839	0.28
Puti Martinez	Independent	1,671	0.26
Total		654,393	100.00
Total votes		100,047	–
Registered voters/turnout		117,481	85.16
Source: Commission on Elections

== Sorsogon ==
=== Governor ===
Incumbent Governor Francis Escudero of the Nationalist People's Coalition (NPC) ran for the Senate.

The NPC nominated Casiguran mayor Jose Edwin Hamor, who won the election against former Sorsogon governor Sally Ante Lee (National Unity Party) and two other candidates.

Candidate	Party	Votes	%
Jose Edwin Hamor	Nationalist People's Coalition	285,888	72.81
Sally Lee	National Unity Party	101,448	25.84
Noli Gimena	Partido Pederal ng Maharlika	3,464	0.88
Yaps Sentes	Independent	1,866	0.48
Total		392,666	100.00
Total votes		468,768	–
Registered voters/turnout		538,082	87.12
NPC hold			
Source: Commission on Elections

=== Vice Governor ===
Incumbent Vice Governor Wowo Fortes of the Nationalist People's Coalition (NPC) ran for the House of Representatives in Sorsogon's 2nd legislative district.

The NPC nominated provincial board member Jun Escudero, who won against former Sorsogon vice governor Renato Laurinaria (National Unity Party) and Revor Lasay (PDP–Laban).

Candidate	Party	Votes	%
Jun Escudero	Nationalist People's Coalition	290,282	81.28
Renato Laurinaria	National Unity Party	58,796	16.46
Revor Lasay	PDP–Laban	8,064	2.26
Total		357,142	100.00
Total votes		468,768	–
Registered voters/turnout		538,082	87.12
NPC hold			
Source: Commission on Elections

=== Provincial Board ===
The Sorsogon Provincial Board is composed of 13 board members, 10 of whom are elected.

The Nationalist People's Coalition won 10 seats, maintaining its majority in the provincial board.

Party	Votes	%	Seats	+/–
Nationalist People's Coalition	930,397	73.69	10	+2
National Unity Party	65,349	5.18	0	New
Lakas–CMD	64,107	5.08	0	0
PDP–Laban	43,641	3.46	0	–1
United Nationalist Alliance	37,860	3.00	0	0
Partido Pederal ng Maharlika	17,290	1.37	0	New
Partido Federal ng Pilipinas	6,696	0.53	0	0
Independent	97,229	7.70	0	–1
Total	1,262,569	100.00	10	0
Total votes	468,768	–		
Registered voters/turnout	538,082	87.12		

==== 1st district ====
Sorsogon's 1st provincial district consists of the same area as Sorsogon's 1st legislative district. Five board members are elected from this provincial district.

10 candidates were included in the ballot.

Candidate	Party	Votes	%
Ryan Dioneda (incumbent)	Nationalist People's Coalition	110,089	17.64
Nini Ravanilla	Nationalist People's Coalition	100,951	16.17
Chuck Lubiano	Nationalist People's Coalition	98,765	15.82
Ed Atutubo (incumbent)	Nationalist People's Coalition	88,112	14.12
Junjun Mella (incumbent)	Nationalist People's Coalition	87,731	14.06
Larry Dioneda	Independent	59,506	9.53
Elmer Mirandilla	Independent	32,377	5.19
Lando Arogante	Partido Pederal ng Maharlika	17,290	2.77
Lovemer Lovendino	National Unity Party	15,686	2.51
Tony Imperial	Pederalismo ng Dugong Dakilang Samahan	13,670	2.19
Total		624,177	100.00
Total votes		239,581	–
Registered voters/turnout		274,532	87.27
Source: Commission on Elections

==== 2nd district ====
Sorsogon's 2nd provincial district consists of the same area as Sorsogon's 2nd legislative district. Five board members are elected from this provincial district.

13 candidates were included in the ballot.

Candidate	Party	Votes	%
Ramil Robles	Nationalist People's Coalition	100,362	15.72
Johnny Guysayko (incumbent)	Nationalist People's Coalition	92,358	14.47
Boytee Doma	Nationalist People's Coalition	88,790	13.91
Roland Añonuevo (incumbent)	Nationalist People's Coalition	87,754	13.75
Jun Ong	Nationalist People's Coalition	75,485	11.82
Joanne Solis	National Unity Party	49,663	7.78
Aiza Encinares	Lakas–CMD	38,864	6.09
Bryan Escandor	Pederalismo ng Dugong Dakilang Samahan	29,971	4.69
Dante Gabito	United Nationalist Alliance	23,394	3.66
Nono Lopez	United Nationalist Alliance	14,466	2.27
Romeo Fulay	Lakas–CMD	13,218	2.07
Rene Hadap	Lakas–CMD	12,025	1.88
Berting Diño	Partido Federal ng Pilipinas	6,696	1.05
Jack Holaso	Independent	5,346	0.84
Total		638,392	100.00
Total votes		229,187	–
Registered voters/turnout		263,550	86.96
Source: Commission on Elections
