= 2025 Philippine local elections in the Bicol Region =

- May 12, 2025
- Gubernatorial elections
- 6 provincial governors and 1 city mayor
Party	Seats	+/–
Lakas	1	New
Liberal	1	0
NPC	1	−1
NUP	1	+1
PDP–Laban	1	−1
PFP	1	+1
Independent	1	+1
This lists parties that won seats. See the complete results below.
- Vice gubernatorial elections
- 6 provincial vice governors and 1 city vice mayors
Party	Seats	+/–
Lakas	3	New
Liberal	2	0
NPC	1	0
NUP	1	+1
This lists parties that won seats. See the complete results below.
- Provincial Board elections
- 60 provincial board members and 10 city councilors
Party	Seats	+/–
Lakas	22	+17
NPC	16	+2
Liberal	10	−3
NUP	8	+4
PFP	8	+8
PDP–Laban	3	−23
Nacionalista	1	−1
Independent	2	+1
This lists parties that won seats. See the complete results below.

The 2025 Philippine local elections in the Bicol Region was held on May 12, 2025.

== Summary ==
=== Governors ===
Province/city	Incumbent	Incumbent's party	Winner	Winner's party	Winning margin
Albay	Glenda Bongao	Liberal	Noel Rosal	PDP–Laban	1.15%
Camarines Norte	Ricarte Padilla	PFP	Ricarte Padilla	PFP	24.67%
Camarines Sur	Luigi Villafuerte	NUP	Luis Raymund Villafuerte	NUP	9.68%
Catanduanes	Joseph Cua	Lakas	Patrick Azanza	Independent	0.22%
Masbate	Antonio Kho	Lakas	Richard Kho	Lakas	42.16%
Naga (ICC)	Nelson Legacion	Lakas	Leni Robredo	Liberal	85.06%
Sorsogon	Jose Edwin Hamor	NPC	Jose Edwin Hamor	NPC	59.11%

=== Vice governors ===
Province/city	Incumbent	Incumbent's party	Winner	Winner's party	Winning margin
Albay	Rey Bragais	Lakas	Diday Co	Lakas	14.88%
Camarines Norte	Joseph Ascutia	Liberal	Joseph Ascutia	Liberal	25.12%
Camarines Sur	Sal Fortuno Jr.	NUP	Sal Fortuno Jr.	NUP	70.04%
Catanduanes	Peter Cua	Lakas	Obet Fernandez	Lakas	20.56%
Masbate	Elisa Olga Kho	Lakas	Fernando Talisic	Lakas	54.54%
Naga (ICC)	Nene de Asis	Liberal	Gabriel Bordado	Liberal	5.74%
Sorsogon	Jun Escudero	NPC	Jun Escudero	NPC	45.81%

=== Provincial boards ===
Province/city	Seats	Party control		Composition
Province/city	Seats	Previous	Result	Composition
Albay	10 elected 3 ex-officio	No majority	Lakas	Lakas (7); Liberal (2); PDP–Laban (1)
Camarines Norte	10 elected 4 ex-officio	No majority	PFP	PFP (8); NPC (1); Nacionalista (1)
Camarines Sur	10 elected 3 ex-officio	PDP–Laban	NUP	NUP (8); NPC (2)
Catanduanes	10 elected 3 ex-officio	No majority	Lakas	Lakas (7); NPC (3)
Masbate	10 elected 3 ex-officio	PDP–Laban	Lakas	Lakas (8); PDP–Laban (2)
Naga (ICC)	10 elected 2 ex-officio	Liberal	Liberal	Liberal (8); Independent (2)
Sorsogon	10 elected 3 ex-officio	NPC	NPC	NPC (10)

== Albay ==
=== Governor ===
Incumbent Governor Glenda Bongao of the Liberal Party ran for vice mayor of Tabaco. Bongao became governor on April 28, 2025, after Edcel Greco Lagman was dismissed for accepting money from illegal gambling.

Former Albay governor Noel Rosal (PDP–Laban) won the election against representative Joey Salceda (Lakas–CMD) and Rosaler Sara Jr. (Independent).

On December 27, 2024, the Commission on Elections disqualified Rosal due to being dismissed as governor in 2022. However, the Supreme Court ordered on January 21, 2025, to temporarily stop Rosal's disqualification, allowing him to be listed on the ballot.

Edcel Greco Lagman initially ran for a full term as governor under the Partido Federal ng Pilipinas, but withdrew on December 5, 2024, and endorsed Rosal.

Candidate	Party	Votes	%
Noel Rosal	PDP–Laban	404,015	50.19
Joey Salceda	Lakas–CMD	394,822	49.04
Rosaler Sara Jr.	Independent	6,195	0.77
Total		805,032	100.00
Valid votes		805,032	95.82
Invalid/blank votes		35,151	4.18
Total votes		840,183	100.00
Registered voters/turnout		940,114	89.37
PDP–Laban gain from Liberal			
Source: Commission on Elections

=== Vice Governor ===
Incumbent Vice Governor Rey Bragais of Lakas–CMD ran for mayor of Tabaco. Bragais became vice governor on May 2, 2025, after Glenda Bongao became governor upon Edcel Greco Lagman's dismissal.

Lakas–CMD nominated Diday Co, who won the election against Jun Alegre (PDP–Laban), provincial board member Te Arandia (Independent) and Gil Goyena (Workers' and Peasants' Party).

Candidate	Party	Votes	%
Diday Co	Lakas–CMD	400,631	54.12
Jun Alegre	PDP–Laban	290,511	39.24
Te Arandia	Independent	42,606	5.76
Gil Goyena	Workers' and Peasants' Party	6,535	0.88
Total		740,283	100.00
Valid votes		740,283	88.11
Invalid/blank votes		99,900	11.89
Total votes		840,183	100.00
Registered voters/turnout		940,114	89.37
Lakas hold			
Source: Commission on Elections

=== Provincial Board ===
The Albay Provincial Board is composed of 13 board members, 10 of whom are elected.

Lakas–CMD won seven seats, gaining a majority in the provincial board.

Party	Votes	%	Seats	+/–
Lakas–CMD	1,042,344	56.60	7	+6
Liberal Party	287,253	15.60	2	0
PDP–Laban	133,296	7.24	1	0
Partido Federal ng Pilipinas	114,456	6.21	0	New
Katipunan ng Nagkakaisang Pilipino	95,170	5.17	0	–1
National Unity Party	70,979	3.85	0	–2
Independent	98,249	5.33	0	0
Total	1,841,747	100.00	10	0
Total votes	840,183	–		
Registered voters/turnout	940,114	89.37		
Source: Commission on Elections

==== 1st district ====
Albay's 1st provincial district consists of the same area as Albay's 1st legislative district. Three board members are elected from this provincial district.

Seven candidates were included in the ballot.

Candidate	Party	Votes	%
Sheina Onrubia	Liberal Party	110,800	20.64
Gio Bongao	Liberal Party	103,011	19.19
Carol Ziga	Lakas–CMD	102,597	19.12
Elmar Barreda	Liberal Party	73,442	13.68
Coco RB Borejon	Lakas–CMD	70,388	13.12
Arnaldo Bragais	Lakas–CMD	69,727	12.99
Antonio Cantal	Independent	6,733	1.25
Total		536,698	100.00
Total votes		244,196	–
Registered voters/turnout		274,912	88.83
Source: Commission on Elections

==== 2nd district ====
Albay's 2nd provincial district consists of the same area as Albay's 2nd legislative district. Three board members are elected from this provincial district.

Seven candidates were included in the ballot.

Candidate	Party	Votes	%
Melissa Abadeza (incumbent)	Lakas–CMD	162,149	27.52
Glenn Casulla	Lakas–CMD	135,149	22.94
Harold Imperial	PDP–Laban	114,054	19.36
Ygi Ojano	Katipunan ng Nagkakaisang Pilipino	95,170	16.15
Rudy Llosala	Partido Federal ng Pilipinas	31,733	5.39
Joel Manzano	Independent	28,700	4.87
Jordan Alpajaro	Independent	22,193	3.77
Total		589,148	100.00
Total votes		296,740	–
Registered voters/turnout		327,382	90.64
Source: Commission on Elections

==== 3rd district ====
Albay's 3rd provincial district consists of the same area as Albay's 3rd legislative district. Four board members are elected from this provincial district.

Nine candidates were included in the ballot.

Candidate	Party	Votes	%
Juan Miguel Salceda	Lakas–CMD	170,696	23.84
Brayan Arandia	Lakas–CMD	121,428	16.96
Manny Ribaya	Lakas–CMD	105,427	14.73
Das Maronilla	Lakas–CMD	104,783	14.64
Herbert Borja	Partido Federal ng Pilipinas	82,723	11.56
Gina Peralta	National Unity Party	70,979	9.91
Clara Madrid	Independent	33,024	4.61
Prime Reluya	PDP–Laban	19,242	2.69
Ramonito Lauta	Independent	7,599	1.06
Total		715,901	100.00
Total votes		299,247	–
Registered voters/turnout		337,820	88.58
Source: Commission on Elections

== Camarines Norte ==
=== Governor ===
Incumbent Governor Ricarte Padilla of the Partido Federal ng Pilipinas ran for a second term. He was previously affiliated with Aksyon Demokratiko.

Padilla won re-election against former Camarines Norte governor Edgar Tallado (Nationalist People's Coalition) and Romeo Balmeo (Independent).

Candidate	Party	Votes	%
Ricarte Padilla (incumbent)	Partido Federal ng Pilipinas	203,987	62.08
Edgar Tallado	Nationalist People's Coalition	122,915	37.41
Romeo Balmeo	Independent	1,693	0.52
Total		328,595	100.00
Valid votes		328,595	97.17
Invalid/blank votes		9,586	2.83
Total votes		338,181	100.00
Registered voters/turnout		396,583	85.27
PFP hold			
Source: Commission on Elections

=== Vice Governor ===
Incumbent Vice Governor Joseph Ascutia of the Liberal Party ran for a second term.

Ascutia won re-election against provincial board member Artemio Serdon Jr. (Nationalist People's Coalition) and John Rom (Independent).

Candidate	Party	Votes	%
Joseph Ascutia (incumbent)	Liberal Party	188,443	61.74
Artemio Serdon Jr.	Nationalist People's Coalition	111,775	36.62
John Rom	Independent	4,980	1.63
Total		305,198	100.00
Valid votes		305,198	90.25
Invalid/blank votes		32,983	9.75
Total votes		338,181	100.00
Registered voters/turnout		396,583	85.27
Liberal hold			
Source: Commission on Elections

=== Provincial Board ===
The Camarines Norte Provincial Board is composed of 14 board members, 10 of whom are elected.

The Partido Federal ng Pilipinas won eight seats, gaining a majority in the provincial board.

Party	Votes	%	Seats	+/–
Partido Federal ng Pilipinas	650,531	57.06	8	New
Nationalist People's Coalition	383,524	33.64	1	New
Nacionalista Party	63,479	5.57	1	New
Independent	42,647	3.74	0	0
Total	1,140,181	100.00	10	0
Total votes	338,181	–		
Registered voters/turnout	396,583	85.27		
Source: Commission on Elections

==== 1st district ====
Camarines Norte's 1st provincial district consists of the same area as Camarines Norte's 1st legislative district. Five board members are elected from this provincial district.

12 candidates were included in the ballot.

Candidate	Party	Votes	%
Lukad de Lima (incumbent)	Partido Federal ng Pilipinas	81,319	14.11
Winnie Oco (incumbent)	Partido Federal ng Pilipinas	67,512	11.71
Mike Canlas	Partido Federal ng Pilipinas	66,292	11.50
Junjun Enova	Nationalist People's Coalition	59,872	10.39
Teresita Malubay (incumbent)	Partido Federal ng Pilipinas	58,544	10.16
Marisol Diaz	Partido Federal ng Pilipinas	54,453	9.45
Bong Quibral	Nationalist People's Coalition	52,271	9.07
Muriel Pandi (incumbent)	Nationalist People's Coalition	45,454	7.88
Aida Dasco	Nationalist People's Coalition	40,427	7.01
Nardz Baning	Independent	22,884	3.97
Mike Dolera	Nationalist People's Coalition	22,790	3.95
Cecille Zabala	Independent	4,683	0.81
Total		576,501	100.00
Total votes		166,946	–
Registered voters/turnout		196,307	85.04
Source: Commission on Elections

==== 2nd district ====
Camarines Norte's 2nd provincial district consists of the same area as Camarines Norte's 2nd legislative district. Five board members are elected from this provincial district.

12 candidates were included in the ballot.

Candidate	Party	Votes	%
Dennis Riel	Partido Federal ng Pilipinas	89,161	15.82
Nol Balane	Partido Federal ng Pilipinas	64,216	11.39
Jonah Pimentel	Nacionalista Party	63,479	11.26
Pol Gache (incumbent)	Partido Federal ng Pilipinas	60,252	10.69
Renee Herrera	Partido Federal ng Pilipinas	58,445	10.37
Noel Pardo	Partido Federal ng Pilipinas	50,337	8.93
Marlon Tejada	Nationalist People's Coalition	49,336	8.75
Gerry Quiñones (incumbent)	Nationalist People's Coalition	41,341	7.33
Wenefredo Abanto Jr.	Nationalist People's Coalition	26,135	4.64
Arnulfo Salagoste	Nationalist People's Coalition	23,768	4.22
Joy Carranza	Nationalist People's Coalition	22,130	3.93
Meo Panotes	Independent	15,080	2.68
Total		563,680	100.00
Total votes		171,235	–
Registered voters/turnout		200,276	85.50
Source: Commission on Elections

== Camarines Sur ==
=== Governor ===
Incumbent Governor Luigi Villafuerte of the National Unity Party (NUP) ran for the House of Representatives in Camarines Sur's 2nd legislative district. He was previously affiliated with PDP–Laban.

The NUP nominated Villafuerte's father, representative Luis Raymund Villafuerte, who won the election against Bong Rodriguez (Nationalist People's Coalition). On April 30, 2025, the Commission on Election's First Division disqualified Rodriguez for alleged misrepresentation regarding his place of residence.

Candidate	Party	Votes	%
Luis Raymund Villafuerte	National Unity Party	526,887	54.84
Bong Rodriguez	Nationalist People's Coalition	433,855	45.16
Total		960,742	100.00
Valid votes		960,742	92.86
Invalid/blank votes		73,872	7.14
Total votes		1,034,614	100.00
Registered voters/turnout		1,222,289	84.65
NUP hold			
Source: Commission on Elections

=== Vice Governor ===
Incumbent Vice Governor Sal Fortuno Jr. of the National Unity Party ran for a second term. He was previously affiliated with PDP–Laban.

Fortuno won re-election against two other candidates.

Candidate	Party	Votes	%
Sal Fortuno Jr. (incumbent)	National Unity Party	571,675	80.99
Ireneo Bongat Jr.	Independent	77,307	10.95
Belen Belano	Independent	56,910	8.06
Total		705,892	100.00
Valid votes		705,892	68.23
Invalid/blank votes		328,722	31.77
Total votes		1,034,614	100.00
Registered voters/turnout		1,222,289	84.65
NUP hold			
Source: Commission on Elections

=== Provincial Board ===
The Camarines Sur Provincial Board is composed of 13 board members, 10 of whom are elected.

The National Unity Party won eight seats, gaining a majority in the provincial board.

Party	Votes	%	Seats	+/–
National Unity Party	883,872	68.15	8	New
Nationalist People's Coalition	322,755	24.88	2	–1
Partido Federal ng Pilipinas	46,529	3.59	0	0
Independent	43,856	3.38	0	New
Total	1,297,012	100.00	10	–
Total votes	1,034,614	–		
Registered voters/turnout	1,222,289	84.65		
Source: Commission on Elections

==== 1st district ====
Camarines Sur's 1st provincial district consists of the same area as Camarines Sur's 1st legislative district. One board member is elected from this provincial district.

Two candidates were included in the ballot.

Candidate	Party	Votes	%
Warren Señar (incumbent)	National Unity Party	60,421	56.89
Bobby Matamorosa	Nationalist People's Coalition	45,786	43.11
Total		106,207	100.00
Total votes		121,265	–
Registered voters/turnout		142,177	85.29
Source: Commission on Elections

==== 2nd district ====
Camarines Sur's 2nd provincial district consists of the same area as Camarines Sur's 2nd legislative district. Two board members are elected from this provincial district.

Three candidates were included in the ballot.

Candidate	Party	Votes	%
Angel Hernandez	National Unity Party	99,051	44.03
Boboy Nopra	National Unity Party	79,389	35.29
Juno Patrick Oriño	Partido Federal ng Pilipinas	46,529	20.68
Total		224,969	100.00
Total votes		184,944	–
Registered voters/turnout		222,775	83.02
Source: Commission on Elections

==== 3rd district ====
Camarines Sur's 3rd provincial district consists of the same area as Camarines Sur's 3rd legislative district excluding the city of Naga. Two board members are elected from this provincial district.

Five candidates were included in the ballot.

Candidate	Party	Votes	%
Vanessa Señar (incumbent)	National Unity Party	91,839	43.87
Pol Manaog (incumbent)	National Unity Party	73,644	35.18
Randy Villaralbo	Independent	24,680	11.79
Emelita Benitez	Independent	10,906	5.21
Ruben Catimbang	Independent	8,270	3.95
Total		209,339	100.00
Total votes		183,751	–
Registered voters/turnout		217,815	84.36
Source: Commission on Elections

==== 4th district ====
Camarines Sur's 4th provincial district consists of the same area as Camarines Sur's 4th legislative district. Two board members are elected from this provincial district.

Three candidates were included in the ballot.

Candidate	Party	Votes	%
JJ Pilapil	Nationalist People's Coalition	115,717	36.43
Awel Llaguno (incumbent)	Nationalist People's Coalition	110,481	34.79
Beyong Panuelos	National Unity Party	91,405	28.78
Total		317,603	100.00
Total votes		273,253	–
Registered voters/turnout		314,684	86.83
Source: Commission on Elections

==== 5th district ====
Camarines Sur's 5th provincial district consists of the same area as Camarines Sur's 5th legislative district. Three board members are elected from this provincial district.

Four candidates were included in the ballot.

Candidate	Party	Votes	%
Donna Oñate (incumbent)	National Unity Party	136,113	31.01
Shai Noble (incumbent)	National Unity Party	131,598	29.98
Regin Oliver Oliva	National Unity Party	120,412	27.44
Mel Abonita	Nationalist People's Coalition	50,771	11.57
Total		438,894	100.00
Total votes		271,401	–
Registered voters/turnout		324,838	83.55
Source: Commission on Elections

== Catanduanes ==
=== Governor ===
Incumbent Governor Joseph Cua of Lakas–CMD ran for mayor of Virac. He was previously affiliated with the Nationalist People's Coalition.

Lakas–CMD nominated Cua's brother, Catanduanes vice governor Peter Cua, who was defeated by former Catanduanes State University president Patrick Azanza, an independent. Former Commanding General of the Philippine Army Macairog Alberto (Independent) and Oliver Rodulfo (Independent) also ran for governor.

Candidate	Party	Votes	%
Patrick Azanza	Independent	76,169	47.27
Peter Cua	Lakas–CMD	75,807	47.05
Macairog Alberto	Independent	6,660	4.13
Oliver Rodulfo	Independent	2,489	1.54
Total		161,125	100.00
Valid votes		161,125	92.66
Invalid/blank votes		12,772	7.34
Total votes		173,897	100.00
Registered voters/turnout		200,804	86.60
Independent gain from Lakas			
Source: Commission on Elections

=== Vice Governor ===
Incumbent Vice Governor Peter Cua of Lakas–CMD ran for governor of Catanduanes. He was previously affiliated with PDP–Laban.

Lakas–CMD nominated provincial board member Obet Fernandez, who won the election against former Catanduanes vice governor Shirley Abundo (Independent).

Candidate	Party	Votes	%
Obet Fernandez	Lakas–CMD	91,011	60.28
Shirley Abundo	Independent	59,963	39.72
Total		150,974	100.00
Valid votes		150,974	86.82
Invalid/blank votes		22,923	13.18
Total votes		173,897	100.00
Registered voters/turnout		200,804	86.60
Lakas hold			
Source: Commission on Elections

=== Provincial Board ===
Since Catanduanes' reclassification as a second-class province in 2025, the Catanduanes Provincial Board is composed of 13 board members, 10 of whom are elected.

Lakas–CMD won seven seats, gaining a majority in the provincial board.

Party	Votes	%	Seats	+/–
Lakas–CMD	308,340	61.07	7	+3
Nationalist People's Coalition	110,856	21.96	3	+2
Independent	85,677	16.97	0	–1
Total	504,873	100.00	10	+2
Total votes	173,897	–		
Registered voters/turnout	200,804	86.60		
Source: Commission on Elections

==== 1st district ====
Catanduanes' 1st provincial district consists of the municipalities of Caramoran, San Andres and Virac. Five board members are elected from this district.

Nine candidates were included in the ballot.

Candidate	Party	Votes	%
Santos Zafe (incumbent)	Lakas–CMD	54,332	19.91
Fred Gianan	Lakas–CMD	51,665	18.93
Sonny Francisco (incumbent)	Lakas–CMD	46,901	17.19
Boboy Albaniel	Lakas–CMD	40,916	15.00
Bani Balmadrid	Nationalist People's Coalition	40,261	14.75
Allan Somido	Independent	15,277	5.60
Aldrin Domanais	Independent	10,096	3.70
Domingo Pongan	Independent	8,473	3.11
Jun Torres	Independent	4,943	1.81
Total		272,864	100.00
Total votes		89,713	–
Registered voters/turnout		102,783	87.28
Source: Commission on Elections

==== 2nd district ====
Catanduanes' 2nd provincial district consists of the municipalities of Bagamanoc, Baras, Bato, Gigmoto, Pandan, Panganiban, San Miguel and Viga. Five board members are elected from this district.

Eight candidates were included in the ballot.

Candidate	Party	Votes	%
Edwin Tanael (incumbent)	Lakas–CMD	41,990	18.10
Lorenzo Templonuevo Jr.	Nationalist People's Coalition	40,138	17.30
Boy Balidoy (incumbent)	Lakas–CMD	38,049	16.40
Dean Vergara (incumbent)	Lakas–CMD	34,487	14.86
Arnel Turado	Nationalist People's Coalition	30,457	13.13
Roy Regalado	Independent	27,695	11.94
Amando Tolledo	Independent	11,545	4.98
Fernando Chavez	Independent	7,648	3.30
Total		232,009	100.00
Total votes		84,184	–
Registered voters/turnout		98,021	85.88
Source: Commission on Elections

== Masbate ==
=== Governor ===
Term-limited incumbent Governor Antonio Kho of Lakas–CMD ran for the House of Representatives in Masbate's 1st legislative district. He was previously affiliated with PDP–Laban.

Lakas–CMD nominated Kho's son, representative Richard Kho, who won the election against Masbate City mayor Socrates Tuason (Liberal Party).

Candidate	Party	Votes	%
Richard Kho	Lakas–CMD	321,100	71.08
Socrates Tuason	Liberal Party	130,615	28.92
Total		451,715	100.00
Valid votes		451,715	92.02
Invalid/blank votes		39,149	7.98
Total votes		490,864	100.00
Registered voters/turnout		619,174	79.28
Lakas hold			
Source: Commission on Elections

=== Vice Governor ===
Incumbent Vice Governor Elisa Olga Kho of Lakas–CMD ran for the House of Representatives in Masbate's 2nd legislative district. She was previously affiliated with PDP–Laban.

Lakas–CMD nominated Esperanza mayor Fernando Talisic, who won the election against Pert Gadia (Liberal Party).

Candidate	Party	Votes	%
Fernando Talisic	Lakas–CMD	266,311	77.27
Pert Gadia	Liberal Party	78,361	22.73
Total		344,672	100.00
Valid votes		344,672	70.22
Invalid/blank votes		146,192	29.78
Total votes		490,864	100.00
Registered voters/turnout		619,174	79.28
Lakas hold			
Source: Commission on Elections

=== Provincial Board ===
The Masbate Provincial Board is composed of 13 board members, 10 of whom are elected.

Lakas–CMD won eight seats, gaining a majority in the provincial board.

Party	Votes	%	Seats	+/–
Lakas–CMD	641,186	65.16	8	New
Liberal Party	119,999	12.19	0	New
PDP–Laban	160,290	16.29	2	–8
Independent	62,593	6.36	0	0
Total	984,068	100.00	10	–
Total votes	490,864	–		
Registered voters/turnout	619,174	79.28		
Source: Commission on Elections

==== 1st district ====
Masbate's 1st provincial district consists of the same area as Masbate's 1st legislative district. Two board members are elected from this provincial district.

Four candidates were included in the ballot.

Candidate	Party	Votes	%
Alfredo Alim Jr.	Lakas–CMD	50,471	42.62
Nonong Cantela	Lakas–CMD	45,680	38.58
Antonio Mendoza Jr.	Liberal Party	12,061	10.19
Nilo Cabug	Liberal Party	10,204	8.62
Total		118,416	100.00
Total votes		104,732	–
Registered voters/turnout		128,429	81.55
Source: Commission on Elections

==== 2nd district ====
Masbate's 2nd provincial district consists of the same area as Masbate's 2nd legislative district. Four board members are elected from this provincial district.

Eight candidates were included in the ballot.

Candidate	Party	Votes	%
Vince Revil	Lakas–CMD	105,774	20.03
Tata Danao (incumbent)	Lakas–CMD	100,646	19.06
Kris Espinosa (incumbent)	Lakas–CMD	93,625	17.73
Allan Cos (incumbent)	PDP–Laban	90,320	17.11
Yong Danao	Independent	45,913	8.70
Juls Aguilar	Liberal Party	39,233	7.43
Alex Albao	Liberal Party	35,805	6.78
Gil Bayaban	Independent	16,680	3.16
Total		527,996	100.00
Total votes		218,527	–
Registered voters/turnout		274,067	79.73
Source: Commission on Elections

==== 3rd district ====
Masbate's 3rd provincial district consists of the same area as Masbate's 3rd legislative district. Four board members are elected from this provincial district.

Five candidates were included in the ballot.

Candidate	Party	Votes	%
Bong Gonzales (incumbent)	Lakas–CMD	97,402	28.85
Allan Lepasana (incumbent)	Lakas–CMD	79,726	23.61
Nilda Aguilar	PDP–Laban	69,970	20.72
Ansbert Son	Lakas–CMD	67,862	20.10
Rodolfo Badillo	Liberal Party	22,696	6.72
Total		337,656	100.00
Total votes		167,605	–
Registered voters/turnout		216,678	77.35
Source: Commission on Elections

== Naga ==
=== Mayor ===
Incumbent Mayor Nelson Legacion of Lakas–CMD ran for the House of Representatives in Camarines Sur's 3rd legislative district. Legacion was previously affiliated with the Liberal Party.

Former Vice President Leni Robredo of the Liberal Party won the election against former Pandan, Catanduanes mayor Toots de Quiros (Independent), former city councilor Louie Ortega (Independent), and Ganda Abrazado (Independent).

Candidate	Party	Votes	%
Leni Robredo	Liberal Party	84,377	91.65
Toots de Quiros	Independent	6,070	6.59
Louie Ortega	Independent	894	0.97
Ganda Abrazado	Independent	721	0.78
Total		92,062	100.00
Valid votes		92,062	94.19
Invalid/blank votes		5,679	5.81
Total votes		97,741	100.00
Registered voters/turnout		121,773	80.26
Liberal gain from Lakas			
Source: Commission on Elections

=== Vice Mayor ===
Incumbent Vice Mayor Nene de Asis of the Liberal Party retired.

The Liberal Party nominated representative Gabriel Bordado, who won the election against three other candidates.

Candidate	Party	Votes	%
Gabriel Bordado	Liberal Party	46,690	51.64
Tato Mendoza	Independent	41,504	45.90
Benjamin Villafuerte	Independent	1,451	1.60
Topi Fortuna	Independent	778	0.86
Total		90,423	100.00
Valid votes		90,423	92.51
Invalid/blank votes		7,318	7.49
Total votes		97,741	100.00
Registered voters/turnout		121,773	80.26
Liberal hold			
Source: Commission on Elections

=== City Council ===
The Naga City Council is composed of 12 councilors, 10 of whom are elected.

24 candidates were included in the ballot.

The Liberal Party won eight seats, maintaining its majority in the city council.

Party	Votes	%	Seats	+/–
Liberal Party	391,192	63.71	8	–2
National Unity Party	55,859	9.10	0	New
Kusog Bikolandia	15,736	2.56	0	New
Bunyog Party	3,649	0.59	0	New
Independent	147,627	24.04	2	+2
Total	614,063	100.00	10	0
Total votes	97,741	–		
Registered voters/turnout	121,773	80.26		
Source: Commission on Elections

Candidate	Party	Votes	%
Elmer Baldemoro	Liberal Party	53,144	8.65
Jess Albeus (incumbent)	Liberal Party	48,497	7.90
Oying Rosales (incumbent)	Liberal Party	44,784	7.29
Vito Borja II	Liberal Party	39,061	6.36
Gayle Abonal-Gomez (incumbent)	Liberal Party	37,857	6.17
Omar Buenafe (incumbent)	Liberal Party	37,728	6.14
Jude Diokno	Independent	34,984	5.70
Frank Mendoza	Liberal Party	34,749	5.66
Areiz Macaraig	Liberal Party	33,630	5.48
Nathan Sergio	Independent	32,211	5.25
Joeper Perez (incumbent)	Liberal Party	31,189	5.08
Miles Raquid Arroyo	Liberal Party	30,553	4.98
Brim Mangubat	National Unity Party	26,274	4.28
Simeon Adan	Independent	19,958	3.25
Jak Villafuerte	Independent	17,708	2.88
Toby Bongon	Independent	17,263	2.81
Boboy Luntok	National Unity Party	15,622	2.54
CK Mendoza	Independent	14,788	2.41
Ferds de Hitta	National Unity Party	13,963	2.27
Nono Salak	Kusog Bikolandia	9,892	1.61
Hector Sales	Independent	7,761	1.26
Gil Belen	Kusog Bikolandia	5,844	0.95
Bert Benitez	Bunyog Party	3,649	0.59
July Catimbang	Independent	2,954	0.48
Total		614,063	100.00
Total votes		97,741	–
Registered voters/turnout		121,773	80.26
Source: Commission on Elections

== Sorsogon ==
=== Governor ===
Incumbent Governor of Sorsogon Jose Edwin Hamor of the Nationalist People's Coalition ran for a second term.

Hamor won re-election against Matnog mayor Cattleya So (Partido Federal ng Pilipinas) and Edwin Zuñiga (Reform PH Party).

Candidate	Party	Votes	%
Jose Edwin Hamor (incumbent)	Nationalist People's Coalition	339,284	78.95
Cattleya So	Partido Federal ng Pilipinas	85,267	19.84
Edwin Zuñiga	Reform PH Party	5,208	1.21
Total		429,759	100.00
Valid votes		429,759	90.41
Invalid/blank votes		45,572	9.59
Total votes		475,331	100.00
Registered voters/turnout		553,240	85.92
NPC hold			
Source: Commission on Elections

=== Vice Governor ===
Incumbent Vice Governor Jun Escudero of the Nationalist People's Coalition ran for a second term.

Escudero won re-election against provincial board member Ryan Dioneda (Independent) and Willy Larosa (Reform PH Party).

Candidate	Party	Votes	%
Jun Escudero (incumbent)	Nationalist People's Coalition	275,839	72.01
Ryan Dioneda	Independent	100,383	26.20
Willy Larosa	Reform PH Party	6,855	1.79
Total		383,077	100.00
Valid votes		383,077	80.59
Invalid/blank votes		92,254	19.41
Total votes		475,331	100.00
Registered voters/turnout		553,240	85.92
NPC hold			
Source: Commission on Elections

=== Provincial Board ===
The Sorsogon Provincial Board is composed of 13 board members, 10 of whom are elected.

The Nationalist People's Coalition won 10 seats, maintaining its majority in the provincial board.

Party	Votes	%	Seats	+/–
Nationalist People's Coalition	940,187	71.26	10	0
People's Reform Party	189,277	14.35	0	New
Reform PH Party	87,485	6.63	0	New
Independent	102,420	7.76	0	0
Total	1,319,369	100.00	10	–
Total votes	475,331	–		
Registered voters/turnout	553,240	85.92		
Source: Commission on Elections

==== 1st district ====
Sorsogon's 1st provincial district consists of the same area as Sorsogon's 1st legislative district. Five board members are elected from this provincial district.

10 candidates were included in the ballot.

Candidate	Party	Votes	%
Nini Ravanilla (incumbent)	Nationalist People's Coalition	114,125	18.67
Ed Atutubo (incumbent)	Nationalist People's Coalition	102,255	16.73
Junjun Mella (incumbent)	Nationalist People's Coalition	99,239	16.24
Luis Leosala Jr.	Nationalist People's Coalition	76,636	12.54
Dave Duran	Nationalist People's Coalition	72,232	11.82
Atan Balintong	Reform PH Party	61,491	10.06
Elmer Mirandilla	People's Reform Party	31,296	5.12
Ryan Aanacio	Independent	27,993	4.58
Nonoy Lacsa	Reform PH Party	17,949	2.94
Carol Sumangil	Reform PH Party	8,045	1.32
Total		611,261	100.00
Total votes		239,320	–
Registered voters/turnout		282,352	84.76
Source: Commission on Elections

==== 2nd district ====
Sorsogon's 2nd provincial district consists of the same area as Sorsogon's 2nd legislative district. Five board members are elected from this provincial district.

13 candidates were included in the ballot.

Candidate	Party	Votes	%
Ramil Robles (incumbent)	Nationalist People's Coalition	116,843	16.50
Boytee Doma (incumbent)	Nationalist People's Coalition	96,884	13.68
Roland Añonuevo (incumbent)	Nationalist People's Coalition	88,703	12.53
Jun Ong (incumbent)	Nationalist People's Coalition	86,876	12.27
Christian Lim	Nationalist People's Coalition	86,394	12.20
Ton Erlano	People's Reform Party	65,409	9.24
Jun Glipo	Independent	54,952	7.76
Bryan Escandor	People's Reform Party	37,619	5.31
Bobot Alindogan	People's Reform Party	27,026	3.82
Dama Oro	People's Reform Party	15,200	2.15
Bobot Laguna	People's Reform Party	12,727	1.80
Rene Hadap	Independent	9,779	1.38
Jose Grafil	Independent	9,696	1.37
Total		708,108	100.00
Total votes		236,011	–
Registered voters/turnout		270,888	87.12
Source: Commission on Elections
