= Xu (surname 許) =

Xu / Hsu / Hui
- Pronunciation: Xǔ (Mandarin); Khó͘ (Hokkien); Heoi2 (Cantonese); Kóu (Teochew); Hứa (Vietnamese)
- Language: Chinese

Origin
- Language: Chinese
- Meaning: to allow

Other names
- Variant forms: Xu, Hsu (Mandarin); Hui, Hoi, Hua (Cantonese); Shue, Shea (Taiwanese); Kho, Khor, Khaw, Ko (Hokkien); Koh, Khoh, Kho (Teochew); Hii, Hee, Hoo (Fuzhou); Koo (Hakka); Hy (Vietnamese); Co, Ngo (Filipino)
- Derivative: Heo (Korean)

Xu
- Traditional Chinese: 許
- Simplified Chinese: 许
Transcriptions
Standard Mandarin
- Hanyu Pinyin: Xǔ
- Wade–Giles: hsü^{3}
Yue: Cantonese
- Jyutping: Heoi^{2}

Xu (traditional Chinese: 許; simplified Chinese: 许; pinyin: Xǔ; Wade–Giles: Hsü^{³}; Jyutping: Heoi^{2}) is a Chinese surname. In the Wade-Giles system of romanization, it is romanized as Hsu, which is commonly used in Taiwan.

== Variations ==
=== Sinitic languages ===
- Cantonese: Heoi (Jyutping), Héui (Yale Romanization), Hui, Hoi, Hooi.
- Hokkien: Khó͘ (Pe̍h-ōe-jī), Khóo (Tâi-lô).
- Teochew: Kóu, Kho, Koh, Khoh, Khor, Khaw, Ko.
- Fuzhou: Hii, Hee, Hoo.
- Hakka: Koo.

=== Other languages ===
In Japanese, 許 is transliterated as Yurusu, Bakari, or Moto and in Sino-Japanese as Kyo or Ko.

In the Yale romanization of Korean, 許 is Heo (허).

In Vietnamese, the character 許 is converted to Hứa. The Hoa people overseas Chinese of Vietnam with the surname 許 / 许 may have it spelled as Hái or Hy when immigrating to the English-speaking World, particularly the United States. Other spellings include Hee and Hu.

In Cebuano and Tagalog, 許 is transliterated as Co and Ngo.

== Origins ==
The surname 許 / 许 Xǔ has multiple theories regarding its origin.

One of the more credible ones states that the surname Xu originated from the feudal state of Xu in the area of Xǔchāng, now known as Jian'an District in Xuchang City, of present-day Henan, during the Zhou dynasty.

A different theory states that the surname originated even earlier with the fabled Xu You (許由 / 许由), a sage in the time of the fabled Emperor Yao, not to be confused with the later another Xu You (許攸 / 许攸) who was a military strategist of the warlord Yuan Shao during the late Han dynasty. Xu You's descendants carried on the surname of their famed ancestor, thereby establishing Xu as a surname. Later on in the history of ancient China, it became popular among scholars of the time to postulate that Xu You must have been the ancestor of that feudal lord whose surname was Xu.

The posterities with state as surname called Xu, were authentic known as Xu. In tale of Emperor Yao, Xu You posterities surname also called Xu. Xu by handing down was the person of integrity talented person of Yao and Shun time, lives in Jishan. After many years later, the posterity called this mountain as Xu Youshan. More than years ago activity near Yu Yingshui the basin under Jishan. As there are many dialects in Chinese speaking world, there are several spellings of surname Xu.

== People ==
=== Xu ===
- Xu Aimin (許愛民; born 1957), Chinese former politician
- Xu Anqi (許安琪; born 1992), Chinese épée fencer, Olympic gold medalist
- Xu Binshu (許斌姝; born 1988), Chinese former competitive figure skater
- Xu Bo (許博; born 1985), Chinese footballer
- Chenyang Xu (许晨阳; born 1981), Chinese mathematician
- Xu Chu (許褚; died c. 230), Cao Wei general
- Xu Ci (許慈; fl. 3rd century), Shu Han official and scholar
- Xu Daoning (許道寧; c. 970–1051/53), Chinese painter
- Xu Dishan (許地山; 1893–1941), Taiwanese-born Chinese author, translator, folklorist
- Xu Pingjun (许平君; 89?-71 B.C.), First wife of Emperor Xuan of Han, mother of Emperor Yuan of Han
- Empress Xu (Cheng) (許皇后; personal name unknown, likely Xu Kua (許誇), died c. 8 BC), empress during the Han Dynasty
- Xu Gong (許貢; died 200), Chinese official and warlord
- Xu Guiyuan (許桂源; born 1996), Chinese former professional baseball first baseman and outfielder
- Xu Guangda (許光達; 1908–1969), Chinese army general
- Xu Guangping (許廣平; 1898–1968), Chinese writer, politician, social activist
- Xu Haifeng (許海峰; born 1957), Chinese pistol shooter, the first People's Republic of China's athlete to win Olympic gold medal
- Xu Heng (許衡; 1209–1281), Yuan Dynasty Confucianist and educator
- Xu Hun (許渾; fl. 800s), Tang Dynasty poet
- Jack Liangjie Xu (許良傑; born 1970), Chinese software engineer, technology executive, venture capitalist
- Jay Xu (許傑; born 1963), Chinese-born American museum director, curator, art historian
- Xu Ji (許寂; died 936), official of the Chinese Five Dynasties and Ten Kingdoms period state Former Shu
- Xu Jiajun (許嘉俊; born 1995), Chinese footballer
- Xu Jianping (許建平; 1955–2015), Chinese international footballer
- Xu Jiaqi (許佳琪; born 1995), Chinese singer and actress, former member of girl groups SNH48 and The9
- Xu Jiatun (許家屯; 1916–2016), Chinese politician and dissident, former Governor of Jiangsu
- Xu Jiayin (許家印; born 1958), Chinese former billionaire businessman
- Xu Jidan (許繼丹; born 1990), Chinese model and beauty pageant titleholder, Miss China 2012
- Xu Jingcheng (許景澄; 1845–1900), Chinese diplomat and Qing politician
- Xu Jingzong (許敬宗; 592–672), Tang Dynasty chancellor, cartographer, historian
- Xu Kai (許凱; born 1995), Chinese actor and model
- Xu Keqiong (許可瓊; died 950s), general of the Chinese Five Dynasties and Ten Kingdoms period state Chu
- Lady Xu Mu (fl. 7th century BC), first recorded female poet in Chinese history, princess of the State of Wey
- Xu Leiran (許磊然; 1918–2009), Chinese translator
- Xu Li (wrestler) (許莉; born 1989), Chinese freestyle wrestler, Olympic silver medalist
- Xu Liangying (許良英; 1920–2013), Chinese physicist, translator, historian, philosopher
- Xu Lianjie (許連捷; born 1953), Chinese billionaire businessman, CEO of Hengan International
- Xu Mian (diver) (許冕; born 1987), Chinese former diver, Olympic gold medalist
- Xu Ningsheng (許寧生; born 1957), Chinese physicist and academic administrator
- Nora Xu (許乃蜻; born 1995), Chinese model and beauty pageant titleholder, Miss Universe China 2014
- Xu Pingjun (許平君; 89–71 BC), empress during the Han Dynasty
- Xu Qing (許晴; born 1969), Chinese actress
- Xu Rongmao (許榮茂; born 1950), Chinese-Australian entrepreneur and billionaire
- Xu Shao (許劭; 150–195), Han Dynasty philosopher and politician
- Xu Shen (許慎; c. 58–c. 148), Han Dynasty calligrapher, philologist, politician, writer
- Xu Shihui (許世輝; born 1958), Chinese billionaire businessman, founder and chairman of Dali Foods Group
- Xu Shiying (許世英; 1873–1964), Chinese Kuomintang politician
- Xu Shiyou (許世友; 1906–1985), general in the Chinese People's Liberation Army
- Xu Shoushang (許壽裳; 1883–1948), Chinese writer, one of the co-authors of the Twelve Symbols national emblem
- Timmy Xu (許魏洲; born 1994), Chinese actor and singer-songwriter
- Xu Xi (writer) (許素細; born 1954), Hong Kong novelist
- Xu Xin (table tennis) (許昕; born 1990), Chinese professional table tennis player
- Xu Xing (philosopher) (許行; c. 372–c. 289 BC), Chinese philosopher, one of the most notable advocates of agriculturalism
- Xu Xingde (許興德; born 1984), Chinese race walker
- Xu Xinwen (許馨文; born 1995), Chinese singer, dancer, actress
- Xu Xiuzhi (許修直; 1880–1954), Chinese politician
- Xu Xuanping (許宣平), Tang Dynasty Taoist hermit and poet
- Xu Yan (judoka) (許岩; born 1981), Chinese judoka, Olympic bronze medalist
- Xu Yinchuan, (許銀川; born 1975), Chinese professional Xiangqi player
- Xu Yingkui (許應騤; 1830–1903), Qing Dynasty politician
- Xu Yongyue (許永躍; born 1942), former Minister of State Security of the People's Republic of China
- Xu You (Han dynasty) (許攸; died 204), Han Dynasty advisor to warlords Yuan Shao and Cao Cao
- Xu Yuanchong (許淵沖; 1921–2021), Chinese translator and scholar, best known for translating Chinese ancient poems into English and French
- Xu Yuhua (許昱華; born 1976), Chinese chess grandmaster
- Xu Yushi (許圉師; died 679), Tang Dynasty chancellor and politician
- Xu Zhangrun (許章潤; born 1962), Chinese jurist and professor
- Xu Zhihong (許智宏; born 1942), Chinese botanist, former President of Peking University
- Xu Zhiyong (許志永; born 1973), Chinese civil rights activist and academic
- Xu Zhonglin (許仲琳; 1567–1620), Ming Dynasty fantasy novelist
- Xu Zongheng (許宗衡; born 1955), Chinese politician, former mayor of Shenzhen

=== Hsu ===
- Beatrice Hsu (許瑋倫; 1978–2007), Taiwanese actress
- Candy Hsu (許雅涵; born 1998), Taiwanese singer-songwriter and actress
- Hsu Chih-chieh (許智傑; born 1966), Taiwanese politician
- Hsu Cho-yun (許倬雲; born 1930), Taiwanese historian
- Evonne Hsu (許慧欣; born 1976), Taiwanese-American singer
- Hsu Feng-hsiung (許峰雄; born 1959), Taiwanese-American computer scientist and author
- Greg Hsu (許光漢; born 1990), Taiwanese actor and singer
- Hsu Hai-ching (許海清; 1913–2005), Taiwanese veteran gangster
- Hsu Hao-hung (許皓鋐; born 2001), Taiwanese professional Go player
- Henry Hsu (singer) (許富凱; born 1987), Taiwanese singer
- Hsu Hsin-liang (許信良; born 1941), Taiwanese politician
- Jason Hsu (許孟哲; born 1985), Taiwanese singer, actor, ice hockey player
- Hsu Jen-hao (許仁豪; born 1991), Taiwanese badminton player
- Kenneth Hsu (許靖華; born 1929), Chinese scientist and entrepreneur
- Hsu King-shing (許竟成; 1910s–1986), Chinese former football player and manager
- Hsu Kun-yuan (許崑源; 1957–2020), Taiwanese politician
- Hsu Li-ming (許立明; born 1969), Taiwanese politician
- Hsu Li-nung (許歷農; 1919–2025), Taiwanese military officer, politician, activist
- Hsu Ming-tsai (許明財; born 1953), Taiwanese politician
- Natalie Hsu (許恩怡; born 2004), Hong Kong actress
- Peggy Hsu (許哲珮; born 1981), Taiwanese singer-songwriter, music composer, music producer
- Sharon Hsu (許維恩; born 1981), Taiwanese actress and singer
- Hsu Shu-ching (許淑淨; born 1991), Taiwanese weightlifter
- Stephanie Hsu (許瑋倫; born 1990), American actress
- Hsu Su-yeh (許素葉; 1933–2023), Taiwanese politician
- Teresa Hsu (許哲; 1898–2011), Chinese-born Singaporean charity worker and social worker
- Hsu Tzong-li (許宗力; born 1956), Taiwanese judge, former President of the Judicial Yuan of Taiwan
- Valen Hsu (許茹芸; born 1974), Taiwanese singer-songwriter
- Hsu Wei-ning (許瑋甯; born 1984), Taiwanese actress
- Hsu Wen-lung (許文龍; 1928–2023), Taiwanese businessman, founder of Chi Mei Corporation
- Hsu Yi-yun (許翊筠; born 1997), Taiwanese footballer
- Hsu Yu-jen (許毓仁; born 1978), Taiwanese politician, former Member of the Legislative Yuan

=== Others ===
- Alfred Hui (許廷鏗; born 1988), Hong Kong singer and dentist
- Amy Khor (许连碹; born 1958), former Senior Minister of State of Sustainability and the Environment of Singapore
- Andy Hui (許志安; born 1967), Hong Kong singer and actor
- Ann Hui (許鞍華; born 1947), Hong Kong film director, producer, screenwriter, actress
- Benz Hui (許紹雄; 1948–2025), Hong Kong film and TV actor
- Khaw Boon Wan (許文遠; born 1952), former Minister for Transport of Singapore
- Koh Chieng Mun (許靜雯; born 1960), Singaporean actress and comedian
- Corazon Cojuangco-Aquino (许娜桑; 1933–2009), the 11th President of the Philippines
- Dasmond Koh (許振榮; born 1972), Singaporean actor and television host
- Khor Ean Ghee (许延义; born 1934), Singaporean watercolor artist
- Shea Jia-dong (許嘉棟; born 1948), Taiwanese politician and economist
- Khouw Kim An (許金安; 1875–1945), Indonesian politician and landlord
- Hii King Chiong (許慶璋; born 1957), Malaysian businessman and philanthropist
- Khor Kok Soon (许国顺; 1953–c. 2006), Singaporean gunman
- Mavis Hee (許美靜; born 1974), Singaporean singer-songwriter and actress
- Michael Hui (許冠文; born 1942), Hong Kong actor, comedian, scriptwriter, director
- Shue Ming-fa (許明發; born 1950), Taiwanese cyclist
- Shue Ming-shu (許明世; born 1940), Taiwanese former cyclist
- Koh Ngiap Yong (许业荣; 1958–2000), Singaporean murder victim
- Kho Ping Hoo (許平和; 1926–1994), Indonesian author
- Antonio Kho (正确的; born 1958), Filipino civil engineer and politician
- Ara Kho, Filipino politician
- Elisa Olga Kho (正确的; born 1956), Filipino medical doctor and politician
- Richard Kho (正确的; born 1996), Filipino lawyer and politician
- Wilton Kho (正确的; born 1986), Filipino politician
- Rafael Hui (許仕仁; born 1948), former Chief Secretary for Administration of Hong Kong
- Ricky Hui (許冠英; 1946–2011), Hong Kong actor and singer
- Sam Hui (許冠傑; born 1948), Hong Kong musician, singer-songwriter, actor
- Hui Shiu-hung (許紹雄; born 1948), Hong Kong actor
- Hui So Hung (許素虹; born 1958), Indonesian-born Hong Kong table tennis player
- Ted Hui (許智峯; born 1982), former Member of the Legislative Council of Hong Kong
- Vivian Hoo (許嘉雯; born 1990), Malaysian badminton player
- Vivienne Shue (許慧文; born 1944), American sinologist
- Will Shu (許子祥; born 1979), American-British businessman, co-founder and CEO of Deliveroo
- Hii Yang Eng (許媽櫻; Mary Lim; born 1948), Bruneian businesswoman and educator
- Hui Yin-fat (許賢發; 1936–2016), former director of the Hong Kong Council of Social Service
- Hee Yit Foong (許月鳳; born 1963), Malaysian politician
- Sheu Yu-jer (許虞哲; 1952–2020), Taiwanese politician

== See also ==
- Heo (Korean name)
