= List of members of the House of Representatives of the Philippines (K) =

This is a complete list of past and present members of the House of Representatives of the Philippines whose last names begin with the letter K.

This list also includes members of the Philippine Assembly (1907–1916), the Commonwealth National Assembly (1935–1941), the Second Republic National Assembly (1943–1944) and the Batasang Pambansa (1978–1986).

== Ka ==
- Maximo Kalaw, member for Batangas's 3rd district (1935–1941)
- Teodoro Kalaw, member for Batangas's 3rd district (1909–1912)
- Henry Kamora, member for Mountain Province (1922–1925, 1931–1934)
- Ciriaco Kangleon, member for Leyte's 2nd district (1919–1922)
- Ruperto Kapunan, member for Leyte's 4th district (1916–1922), Leyte's 3rd district (1925–1928), and Leyte's 5th district (1931–1934, 1935–1941)
- Doroteo Karagdag, member for Mindanao and Sulu (1934–1935)
- Exequiel Kare, member for Albay's 1st district (1934–1935)
- Gregorio Katigbak, member for Batangas's 3rd district (1907–1909)
- Angelina Katoh, member for Akbayan party-list (2015–2016)

== Kh ==
- Antonio Kho, member for Masbate's 3rd district (1992–1995), Masbate's 2nd district (2007–2013), and Masbate's 1st district (2025–present)
- Ara Kho, member for Masbate's 2nd district (2022–2025)
- David Kho, member for Senior Citizens party-list (2010–2013)
- Olga Kho, member for Masbate's 2nd district (2013–2022, 2025–present)
- Richard Kho, member for Masbate's 1st district (2022–2025)
- Wilton Kho, member for Masbate's 3rd district (2019–present)
- Jay Khonghun, member for Zambales's 1st district (2022–present)
- Jeffrey Khonghun, member for Zambales's 1st district (2013–2022)

== Ki ==
- Agustin Kintanar, member for Cebu's 4th district (1934–1935, 1938–1941, 1945–1949), and Cebu's 3rd district (1935–1938)
- Filomeno Kintanar, member for Cebu's 4th district (1949–1953)
- Isidro Kintanar, member for Cebu's 4th district (1953–1969)
- Jorge Kintanar, member for Region VII (1978–1984)
- Simeon Kintanar, member for Cebu's 2nd district (1998–2007)
- Dadah Kiram Ismula, member for Akbayan party-list (2025–present)
