= 2025 Philippine House of Representatives elections in the Bicol Region =

- May 12, 2025
- All 16 Bicol Region seats in the House of Representatives
Party	Seats	+/–
Lakas	7	+7
NUP	3	+1
NPC	3	0
Liberal	1	−1
PFP	1	New
PDP–Laban	1	−7
This lists parties that won seats. See the complete results below.

The 2025 Philippine House of Representatives elections in the Bicol Region were held on May 12, 2025, as part of the 2025 Philippine general election.

== Summary ==
Congressional district	Incumbent	Incumbent's party	Winner	Winner's party	Winning margin
Albay–1st	Vacant		Krisel Lagman	Liberal	8.96%
Albay–2nd	Joey Salceda	Lakas	Caloy Loria	PDP–Laban	1.16%
Albay–3rd	Fernando Cabredo	NUP	Adrian Salceda	Lakas	1.90%
Camarines Norte–1st	Josefina Tallado	Lakas	Josefina Tallado	Lakas	0.60%
Camarines Norte–2nd	Rosemarie Panotes	Lakas	Rosemarie Panotes	Lakas	55.89%
Camarines Sur–1st	Hori Horibata	NUP	Hori Horibata	NUP	14.64%
Camarines Sur–2nd	Luis Raymund Villafuerte	NUP	Luigi Villafuerte	NUP	27.44%
Camarines Sur–3rd	Gabriel Bordado	Liberal	Nelson Legacion	Lakas	1.41%
Camarines Sur–4th	Arnulf Bryan Fuentebella	NPC	Arnulf Bryan Fuentebella	NPC	12.22%
Camarines Sur–5th	Miguel Luis Villafuerte	NUP	Miguel Luis Villafuerte	NUP	56.86%
Catanduanes	Leo Rodriguez	PFP	Leo Rodriguez	PFP	0.59%
Masbate–1st	Richard Kho	Lakas	Antonio Kho	Lakas	Unopposed
Masbate–2nd	Ara Kho	Lakas	Elisa Olga Kho	Lakas	44.55%
Masbate–3rd	Tonton Kho	Lakas	Tonton Kho	Lakas	78.36%
Sorsogon–1st	Dette Escudero	NPC	Dette Escudero	NPC	Unopposed
Sorsogon–2nd	Wowo Fortes	NPC	Wowo Fortes	NPC	48.86%

== Albay ==
=== 1st district ===
2025 Albay's 1st congressional district election
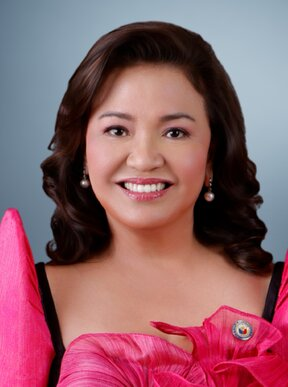

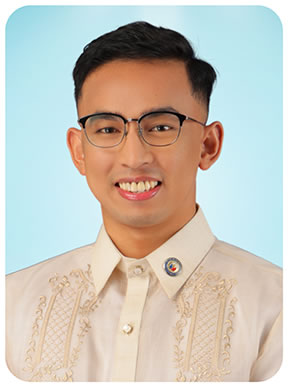
Candidate	Krisel Lagman	Jil Bongalon
Party	Liberal	Lakas
popular vote	128,871	107,656
Percentage	54.48%	45.52%
House representative before election
Edcel Lagman
Liberal
Elected House representative
Krisel Lagman
Liberal

The seat is vacant after Edcel Lagman of the Liberal Party died on January 30, 2025.

The Liberal Party nominated Lagman's daughter, Tabaco mayor Krisel Lagman, who won the election against Ako Bicol representative Jil Bongalon (Lakas–CMD).

Candidate	Party	Votes	%
Krisel Lagman	Liberal Party	128,871	54.48
Jil Bongalon	Lakas–CMD	107,656	45.52
Total		236,527	100.00
Valid votes		236,527	96.86
Invalid/blank votes		7,669	3.14
Total votes		244,196	100.00
Registered voters/turnout		274,912	88.83
Liberal hold			
Source: Commission on Elections

=== 2nd district ===
2025 Albay's 2nd congressional district election
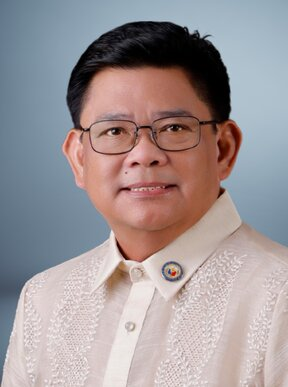
		LAKAS
Candidate	Caloy Loria	Christopher Co
Party	PDP–Laban	Lakas
popular vote	143,436	140,126
Percentage	50.58	49.42%
House representative before election
Joey Salceda
Lakas
Elected House representative
Caloy Loria
PDP–Laban

Term-limited incumbent Joey Salceda of Lakas–CMD ran for governor of Albay. He was previously affiliated with PDP–Laban.

Lakas–CMD nominated former Ako Bicol representative Christopher Co, who was defeated by Caloy Loria of the PDP–Laban.

Candidate	Party	Votes	%
Caloy Loria	PDP–Laban	143,436	50.58
Christopher Co	Lakas–CMD	140,126	49.42
Total		283,562	100.00
Valid votes		283,562	95.56
Invalid/blank votes		13,178	4.44
Total votes		296,740	100.00
Registered voters/turnout		327,382	90.64
PDP–Laban gain from Lakas			
Source: Commission on Elections

=== 3rd district ===
2025 Albay's 3rd congressional district election
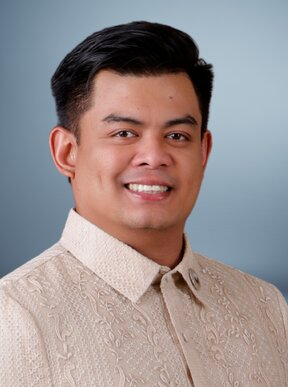

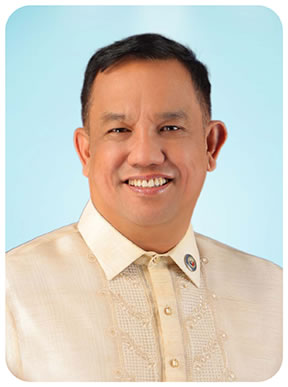
Candidate	Adrian Salceda	Fernando Cabredo
Party	Lakas	NUP
popular vote	144,693	139,308
Percentage	50.95%	49.05%
House representative before election
Fernando Cabredo
NUP
Elected House representative
Adrian Salceda
Lakas

Incumbent Fernando Cabredo of the National Unity Party ran for a third term.

Cabredo was defeated by Polangui mayor Adrian Salceda of Lakas–CMD.

Candidate	Party	Votes	%
Adrian Salceda	Lakas–CMD	144,693	50.95
Fernando Cabredo (incumbent)	National Unity Party	139,308	49.05
Total		284,001	100.00
Valid votes		284,001	94.91
Invalid/blank votes		15,246	5.09
Total votes		299,247	100.00
Registered voters/turnout		337,820	88.58
Lakas gain from NUP			
Source: Commission on Elections

== Camarines Norte ==
=== 1st district ===
Incumbent Josefina Tallado of Lakas–CMD ran for a third term. She was previously affiliated with PDP–Laban.

Tallado won re-election against former representative Cathy Barcelona-Reyes (Partido Federal ng Pilipinas).

Candidate	Party	Votes	%
Josefina Tallado (incumbent)	Lakas–CMD	79,781	50.30
Cathy Barcelona-Reyes	Partido Federal ng Pilipinas	78,838	49.70
Total		158,619	100.00
Valid votes		158,619	95.01
Invalid/blank votes		8,327	4.99
Total votes		166,946	100.00
Registered voters/turnout		196,307	85.04
Lakas hold			
Source: Commission on Elections

=== 2nd district ===
Incumbent Rosemarie Panotes of Lakas–CMD ran for a second term. She was previously affiliated with PDP–Laban.

Panotes won re-election against provincial board member Concon Panotes (Nationalist People's Coalition) and Ninoy Ferrer (Independent).

Candidate	Party	Votes	%
Rosemarie Panotes (incumbent)	Lakas–CMD	122,393	77.24
Concon Panotes	Nationalist People's Coalition	33,828	21.35
Ninoy Ferrer	Independent	2,239	1.41
Total		158,460	100.00
Valid votes		158,460	92.54
Invalid/blank votes		12,775	7.46
Total votes		171,235	100.00
Registered voters/turnout		200,276	85.50
Lakas hold			
Source: Commission on Elections

== Camarines Sur ==
=== 1st district ===
Incumbent Hori Horibata of the National Unity Party ran for a second term. He was previously affiliated with PDP–Laban.

Horibata won re-election against Ragay mayor Thaddy Ramos (Nationalist People's Coalition).

Candidate	Party	Votes	%
Hori Horibata (incumbent)	National Unity Party	66,522	57.32
Thaddy Ramos	Nationalist People's Coalition	49,532	42.68
Total		116,054	100.00
Valid votes		116,054	95.70
Invalid/blank votes		5,211	4.30
Total votes		121,265	100.00
Registered voters/turnout		142,177	85.29
NUP hold			
Source: Commission on Elections

=== 2nd district ===
Term-limited incumbent Luis Raymund Villafuerte of the National Unity Party (NUP) ran for governor of Camarines Sur.

The NUP nominated Villafuerte's son, Camarines Sur governor Luigi Villafuerte, who won the election against San Fernando mayor Fermin Mabulo (Nationalist People's Coalition).

Candidate	Party	Votes	%
Luigi Villafuerte	National Unity Party	107,445	63.72
Fermin Mabulo	Nationalist People's Coalition	61,169	36.28
Total		168,614	100.00
Valid votes		168,614	91.17
Invalid/blank votes		16,330	8.83
Total votes		184,944	100.00
Registered voters/turnout		222,775	83.02
NUP hold			
Source: Commission on Elections

=== 3rd district ===
Term-limited incumbent Gabriel Bordado of the Liberal Party ran for vice mayor of Naga.

Naga mayor Nelson Legacion (Lakas–CMD) won the election against Nonoy Magtuto (National Unity Party) and four other candidates.

Candidate	Party	Votes	%
Nelson Legacion	Lakas–CMD	112,088	43.43
Nonoy Magtuto	National Unity Party	108,444	42.02
Noel de Luna	Kusog Bikolandia	33,789	13.09
Pito Tria	Independent	2,323	0.90
Jarrell Losa	Independent	930	0.36
Salome Togñi	Independent	526	0.20
Total		258,100	100.00
Valid votes		258,100	91.69
Invalid/blank votes		23,392	8.31
Total votes		281,492	100.00
Registered voters/turnout		339,588	82.89
Lakas gain from Liberal			
Source: Commission on Elections

=== 4th district ===
Incumbent Arnulf Bryan Fuentebella of the Nationalist People's Coalition ran for a third term.

Fuentebella won re-election against Marco Gumabao (National Unity Party).

Candidate	Party	Votes	%
Arnulf Bryan Fuentebella (incumbent)	Nationalist People's Coalition	144,731	56.11
Marco Gumabao	National Unity Party	113,229	43.89
Total		257,960	100.00
Valid votes		257,960	94.40
Invalid/blank votes		15,293	5.60
Total votes		273,253	100.00
Registered voters/turnout		314,684	86.83
NPC hold			
Source: Commission on Elections

=== 5th district ===
2025 Camarines Sur's 5th congressional district election
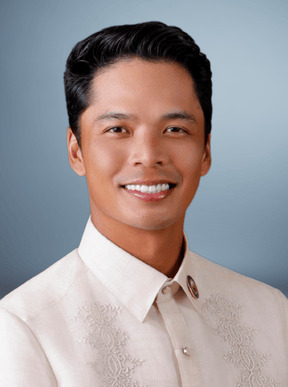
		NPC
Candidate	Miguel Luis Villafuerte	Phil Fortuno
Party	NUP	NPC
Popular vote	192,182	52,850
Percentage	78.43%	21.57%
Representative before election
Miguel Luis Villafuerte
NUP
Elected Representative
Miguel Luis Villafuerte
NUP

Incumbent Miguel Luis Villafuerte of the National Unity Party ran for a second term. He was previously affiliated with PDP–Laban with 60.15%.

Villafuerte won re-election against Phil Fortuno (Nationalist People's Coalition). On April 14, 2025, the Commission on Election's First Division disqualified Fortuno for allegedly misrepresenting his residency after finding that he was a citizen of the United States. Fortuno subsequently filed a pending appeal, saying that he had been a long-term resident of Nabua and only received dual citizenship in 2014.

Candidate	Party	Votes	%
Miguel Luis Villafuerte (incumbent)	National Unity Party	192,182	78.43
Phil Fortuno	Nationalist People's Coalition	52,850	21.57
Total		245,032	100.00
Valid votes		245,032	90.28
Invalid/blank votes		26,369	9.72
Total votes		271,401	100.00
Registered voters/turnout		324,838	83.55
NUP hold			
Source: Commission on Elections

== Catanduanes ==
Incumbent Leo Rodriguez of the Partido Federal ng Pilipinas ran for a second term. He was previously an independent.

Rodriguez won re-election against Virac mayor Sammy Laynes (Lakas–CMD), provincial board member Jan Alberto (Independent) and two other candidates.

Candidate	Party	Votes	%
Leo Rodriguez (incumbent)	Partido Federal ng Pilipinas	61,575	37.06
Sammy Laynes	Lakas–CMD	60,598	36.47
Jan Alberto	Independent	42,161	25.38
Cedric Sanchez	Independent	1,325	0.80
Eugenio Salimao Jr.	Independent	484	0.29
Total		166,143	100.00
Valid votes		166,143	95.54
Invalid/blank votes		7,754	4.46
Total votes		173,897	100.00
Registered voters/turnout		200,804	86.60
PFP hold			
Source: Commission on Elections

== Masbate ==
=== 1st district ===
Incumbent Richard Kho of Lakas–CMD retired to run for governor of Masbate. He was previously affiliated with PDP–Laban.

Lakas–CMD nominated Kho's father, Masbate governor Antonio Kho, who won the election unopposed.

Candidate	Party	Votes	%
Antonio Kho	Lakas–CMD	70,214	100.00
Total		70,214	100.00
Valid votes		70,214	67.04
Invalid/blank votes		34,518	32.96
Total votes		104,732	100.00
Registered voters/turnout		128,429	81.55
Lakas hold			
Source: Commission on Elections

=== 2nd district ===
Incumbent Ara Kho of Lakas–CMD retired to run for mayor of Masbate City. She was previously affiliated with PDP–Laban.

Lakas–CMD nominated Kho's mother, Masbate vice governor Elisa Olga Kho, who won the election against two other candidates.

Candidate	Party	Votes	%
Elisa Olga Kho	Lakas–CMD	141,264	71.78
Noel Tuason	Liberal Party	53,596	27.23
Sherman Valera	Independent	1,954	0.99
Total		196,814	100.00
Valid votes		196,814	90.06
Invalid/blank votes		21,713	9.94
Total votes		218,527	100.00
Registered voters/turnout		274,067	79.73
Lakas hold			
Source: Commission on Elections

=== 3rd district ===
Incumbent Tonton Kho of Lakas–CMD ran for a third term. He was previously affiliated with PDP–Laban.

Kho won the election against Ricar Vasquez (Liberal Party).

Candidate	Party	Votes	%
Tonton Kho (incumbent)	Lakas–CMD	127,161	89.18
Ricar Vasquez	Liberal Party	15,436	10.82
Total		142,597	100.00
Valid votes		142,597	85.08
Invalid/blank votes		25,008	14.92
Total votes		167,605	100.00
Registered voters/turnout		216,678	77.35
Lakas hold			
Source: Commission on Elections

== Sorsogon ==
=== 1st district ===
Incumbent Dette Escudero of the Nationalist People's Coalition won re-election for a second term unopposed.

Candidate	Party	Votes	%
Dette Escudero (incumbent)	Nationalist People's Coalition	197,919	100.00
Total		197,919	100.00
Valid votes		197,919	82.70
Invalid/blank votes		41,401	17.30
Total votes		239,320	100.00
Registered voters/turnout		282,352	84.76
NPC hold			
Source: Commission on Elections

=== 2nd district ===
Incumbent Wowo Fortes of the Nationalist People's Coalition ran for a third term.

Fortes won re-election against Sorsogon vice governor Kruni Escudero (Partido Federal ng Pilipinas) and three other candidates.

Candidate	Party	Votes	%
Wowo Fortes (incumbent)	Nationalist People's Coalition	154,962	73.36
Kruni Escudero	Partido Federal ng Pilipinas	51,759	24.50
Nono Lopez	Independent	2,081	0.99
Totie Gabales	Independent	1,527	0.72
Jack Holaso	Independent	920	0.44
Total		211,249	100.00
Valid votes		211,249	89.51
Invalid/blank votes		24,762	10.49
Total votes		236,011	100.00
Registered voters/turnout		270,888	87.12
NPC hold			
Source: Commission on Elections
