= 2022 Philippine House of Representatives elections in the Bicol Region =

- May 9, 2022
- All 16 Bicol Region seats in the House of Representatives
Party	Seats	+/–
PDP–Laban	8	+2
NPC	3	−1
NUP	2	+1
Liberal	2	0
Independent	1	0
This lists parties that won seats. See the complete results below.

The 2022 Philippine House of Representatives elections in the Bicol Region were held on May 9, 2022.

== Summary ==
Congressional district	Incumbent	Incumbent's party	Winner	Winner's party	Winning margin
Albay–1st	Edcel Lagman	Liberal	Edcel Lagman	Liberal	78.20%
Albay–2nd	Joey Salceda	PDP–Laban	Joey Salceda	PDP–Laban	91.79%
Albay–3rd	Fernando Cabredo	NUP	Fernando Cabredo	NUP	Unopposed
Camarines Norte–1st	Josefina Tallado	PDP–Laban	Josefina Tallado	PDP–Laban	3.38%
Camarines Norte–2nd	Vacant		Rosemarie Panotes	PDP–Laban	24.30%
Camarines Sur–1st	Vacant		Hori Horibata	PDP–Laban	5.96%
Camarines Sur–2nd	Luis Raymund Villafuerte	NUP	Luis Raymund Villafuerte	NUP	57.32%
Camarines Sur–3rd	Gabriel Bordado	Liberal	Gabriel Bordado	Liberal	36.77%
Camarines Sur–4th	Arnulf Bryan Fuentebella	NPC	Arnulf Bryan Fuentebella	NPC	17.20%
Camarines Sur–5th	Jocelyn Fortuno	Nacionalista	Miguel Luis Villafuerte	PDP–Laban	20.30%
Catanduanes	Hector Sanchez	Lakas	Leo Rodriguez	Independent	16.70%
Masbate–1st	Narciso Bravo Jr.	NUP	Richard Kho	PDP–Laban	18.68%
Masbate–2nd	Elisa Olga Kho	PDP–Laban	Ara Kho	PDP–Laban	47.36%
Masbate–3rd	Wilton Kho	PDP–Laban	Wilton Kho	PDP–Laban	27.10%
Sorsogon–1st	Evelina Escudero	NPC	Dette Escudero	NPC	32.84%
Sorsogon–2nd	Vacant		Wowo Fortes	NPC	3.94%

== Albay ==
=== 1st district ===
Incumbent Edcel Lagman of the Liberal Party ran for a third term.

Lagman won re-election against three other candidates.

Candidate	Party	Votes	%
Edcel Lagman (incumbent)	Liberal Party	169,139	87.18
Rebecca Quijano	Independent	17,420	8.98
Nards Bruce	Philippine Green Republican Party	4,275	2.20
Adela Pleshette Villar	Independent	3,175	1.64
Total		194,009	100.00
Total votes		228,183	–
Registered voters/turnout		265,019	86.10
Liberal hold			
Source: Commission on Elections

=== 2nd district ===
Incumbent Joey Salceda of PDP–Laban ran for a third term.

Salceda won re-election against four other candidates.

Candidate	Party	Votes	%
Joey Salceda (incumbent)	PDP–Laban	225,851	94.16
Gil Goyena	Independent	5,677	2.37
Opinyon Bicol de Leoz	Partido Lakas ng Masa	4,427	1.85
Danilo Maravillas	Katipunan ng Kamalayang Kayumanggi	2,295	0.96
Domingo Arao	Independent	1,614	0.67
Total		239,864	100.00
Total votes		270,007	–
Registered voters/turnout		300,750	89.78
PDP–Laban hold			
Source: Commission on Elections

=== 3rd district ===
Incumbent Fernando Cabredo of the National Unity Party won re-election for a second term unopposed. He was previously affiliated with PDP–Laban.

Candidate	Party	Votes	%
Fernando Cabredo (incumbent)	National Unity Party	165,111	100.00
Total		165,111	100.00
Total votes		277,572	–
Registered voters/turnout		324,379	85.57
NUP hold			
Source: Commission on Elections

== Camarines Norte ==
=== 1st district ===
Incumbent Josefina Tallado of PDP–Laban ran for a second term.

Tallado won re-election against former representative Cathy Barcelona-Reyes (National Unity Party).

Candidate	Party	Votes	%
Josefina Tallado (incumbent)	PDP–Laban	79,882	51.69
Cathy Barcelona-Reyes	National Unity Party	74,662	48.31
Total		154,544	100.00
Total votes		166,388	–
Registered voters/turnout		192,328	86.51
PDP–Laban hold			
Source: Commission on Elections

=== 2nd district ===
The seat was vacant after Marisol Panotes of PDP–Laban died on April 29, 2022. Panotes was running for a third term prior to her death.

PDP–Laban substituted Panotes with her daughter, Rosemarie Panotes, who won the election against former Camarines Norte's lone district representative Jojo Unico (Lakas–CMD).

Candidate	Party	Votes	%
Rosemarie Panotes	PDP–Laban	96,270	62.15
Jojo Unico	Lakas–CMD	58,640	37.85
Total		154,910	100.00
Total votes		168,599	–
Registered voters/turnout		192,543	87.56
PDP–Laban hold			
Source: Commission on Elections

== Camarines Sur ==
=== 1st district ===
The seat was vacant after Marissa Mercado-Andaya of the Nationalist People's Coalition (NPC) died on July 5, 2020.

The NPC nominated Mercado-Andaya's sister-in-law, former Pasig mayor Maribel Andaya-Eusebio, who was defeated by Hori Horibata of PDP–Laban.

Candidate	Party	Votes	%
Hori Horibata	PDP–Laban	58,098	52.98
Maribel Andaya-Eusebio	Nationalist People's Coalition	51,555	47.02
Total		109,653	100.00
Total votes		118,004	–
Registered voters/turnout		136,519	86.44
PDP–Laban gain from NPC			
Source: Commission on Elections

=== 2nd district ===
Incumbent Luis Raymund Villafuerte of the National Unity Party ran for a third term. He was previously affiliated with the Nacionalista Party.

Villafuerte won re-election against Aba Abasola (Lakas–CMD).

Candidate	Party	Votes	%
Luis Raymund Villafuerte (incumbent)	National Unity Party	111,743	78.66
Aba Abasola	Lakas–CMD	30,324	21.34
Total		142,067	100.00
Total votes		186,437	–
Registered voters/turnout		217,470	85.73
NUP hold			
Source: Commission on Elections

=== 3rd district ===
Incumbent Gabriel Bordado of the Liberal Party ran for a third term.

Bordado won re-election against Noel de Luna (Pederalismo ng Dugong Dakilang Samahan), former Camarines Sur's 2nd district representative Cho Roco (Lakas–CMD), former Solicitor General of the Philippines Jose Anselmo Cadiz (Aksyon Demokratiko) and Pito Tria (Independent).

Candidate	Party	Votes	%
Gabriel Bordado (incumbent)	Liberal Party	140,357	58.00
Noel de Luna	Pederalismo ng Dugong Dakilang Samahan	51,377	21.23
Cho Roco	Lakas–CMD	29,184	12.06
Jose Anselmo Cadiz	Aksyon Demokratiko	10,780	4.45
Pito Tria	Independent	10,297	4.26
Total		241,995	100.00
Total votes		183,985	–
Registered voters/turnout		218,561	84.18
Liberal hold			
Source: Commission on Elections

=== 4th district ===
Incumbent Arnulf Bryan Fuentebella of the Nationalist People's Coalition ran for a second term.

Fuentebella won re-election against San Jose mayor Antonio Chavez (PDP–Laban).

Candidate	Party	Votes	%
Arnulf Bryan Fuentebella (incumbent)	Nationalist People's Coalition	132,310	58.60
Antonio Chavez	PDP–Laban	93,457	41.40
Total		225,767	100.00
Total votes		258,484	–
Registered voters/turnout		300,303	86.07
NPC hold			
Source: Commission on Elections

=== 5th district ===
Incumbent Jocelyn Fortuno of the Nacionalista Party retired.

Fortuno endorsed Camarines Sur governor Miguel Luis Villafuerte (PDP–Laban), who won the election against Iriga mayor Madel Alfelor (Nationalist People's Coalition).

Candidate	Party	Votes	%
Miguel Luis Villafuerte	PDP–Laban	153,852	60.15
Madel Alfelor	Nationalist People's Coalition	101,944	39.85
Total		255,796	100.00
Total votes		273,911	–
Registered voters/turnout		317,219	86.35
PDP–Laban gain from Nacionalista			
Source: Commission on Elections

== Catanduanes ==
Incumbent Hector Sanchez of Lakas–CMD ran for a second term. He was previously an independent.

Sanchez was defeated by former Bato mayor Leo Rodriguez, an independent. Former representative Cesar Sarmiento (National Unity Party) and Oliver Rodulfo (Liberal Party) also ran for representative.

Candidate	Party	Votes	%
Leo Rodriguez	Independent	75,432	47.10
Hector Sanchez (incumbent)	Lakas–CMD	48,684	30.40
Cesar Sarmiento	National Unity Party	33,281	20.78
Oliver Rodulfo	Liberal Party	2,754	1.72
Total		160,151	100.00
Total votes		173,597	–
Registered voters/turnout		198,872	87.29
Independent gain from Lakas			
Source: Commission on Elections

== Masbate ==
=== 1st district ===
Incumbent Narciso Bravo Jr. of the National Unity Party (NUP) retired to run for governor of Masbate.

The NUP nominated Bravo's wife, former representative Mavi Bravo, who was defeated by Richard Kho of PDP–Laban.

Candidate	Party	Votes	%
Richard Kho	PDP–Laban	57,770	59.34
Marvi Bravo	National Unity Party	39,591	40.66
Total		97,361	100.00
Total votes		105,702	–
Registered voters/turnout		122,539	86.26
PDP–Laban gain from NUP			
Source: Commission on Elections

=== 2nd district ===
Term-limited incumbent Elisa Olga Kho of PDP–Laban ran for vice governor of Masbate.

PDP–Laban nominated Kho's daughter, Masbate vice governor Ara Kho, who won the election against former Masbate's 3rd district representative Scott Davies Lanete (National Unity Party).

Candidate	Party	Votes	%
Ara Kho	PDP–Laban	123,160	73.68
Scott Davies Lanete	National Unity Party	44,000	26.32
Total		167,160	100.00
Total votes		208,126	–
Registered voters/turnout		252,110	82.55
PDP–Laban hold			
Source: Commission on Elections

=== 3rd district ===
Incumbent Wilton Kho of PDP–Laban ran for a second term.

Kho won re-election against former Masbate governor Dayan Lanete (Nationalist People's Coalition).

Candidate	Party	Votes	%
Wilton Kho (incumbent)	PDP–Laban	94,373	63.55
Dayan Lanete	Nationalist People's Coalition	54,121	36.45
Total		148,494	100.00
Total votes		178,879	–
Registered voters/turnout		216,086	82.78
PDP–Laban hold			
Source: Commission on Elections

== Sorsogon ==
=== 1st district ===
Incumbent Evelina Escudero of the Nationalist People's Coalition (NPC) was term-limited.

The NPC nominated Escudero's daughter, Dette Escudero, who won the election against former Castilla mayor Joan Lorenzano (National Unity Party) and Rommel Japson (Independent).

Candidate	Party	Votes	%
Dette Escudero	Nationalist People's Coalition	141,922	65.92
Joan Lorenzano	National Unity Party	71,217	33.08
Rommel Japson	Independent	2,149	1.00
Total		215,288	100.00
Total votes		239,581	–
Registered voters/turnout		274,532	87.27
NPC hold			
Source: Commission on Elections

=== 2nd district ===
The seat was vacant after Bernardita Ramos of the Nationalist People's Coalition (NPC) died on September 8, 2020.

The NPC nominated Sorsogon vice governor Wowo Fortes, who won the election against former Sorsogon governor Bobet Lee Rodrigueza (National Unity Party) and two other candidates.

Candidate	Party	Votes	%
Wowo Fortes	Nationalist People's Coalition	102,103	49.66
Bobet Lee Rodrigueza	National Unity Party	93,996	45.72
Cris Gotladera	Lakas–CMD	6,853	3.33
Edgar Gino	Pederalismo ng Dugong Dakilang Samahan	2,650	1.29
Total		205,602	100.00
Total votes		229,187	–
Registered voters/turnout		263,550	86.96
NPC hold			
Source: Commission on Elections
