= Wilton Kho =

Filipino politician (born 1986)

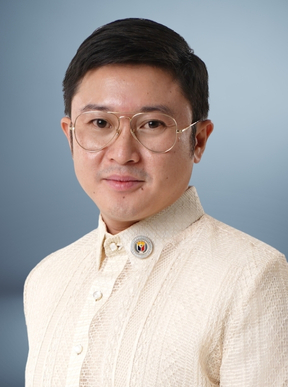
- Official portrait, 2025

Member of the House of Representatives from Masbate’s 3rd District
- Incumbent
- Assumed office June 30, 2019
- Preceded by: Scott Davies Lanete

Mayor of Cataingan
- In office June 30, 2010 – June 30, 2016
- Vice Mayor: George Gonzales Jr.
- Succeeded by: Felipe Cabataña

Personal details
- Born: Wilton Tan Kho; May 13, 1986 (age 40) Zamboanga City, Philippines
- Party: Lakas (2009–2015; 2023–present)
- Other political affiliations: PDP–Laban (2018–2023); Nacionalista (2015–2018)
- Parent(s): Antonio Kho (father); Wilfemia Tan (mother)
- Relatives: Richard Kho (half-brother); Ara Kho (half-sister)
- Education: University of the Philippines
- Occupation: Politician

Wilton "Tonton" Tan Kho (born May 13, 1986) is a Filipino politician. He is currently serving as representative of the 3rd District of Masbate in the House of Representatives of the Philippines since 2019. He served as mayor of Cataingan from 2010 to 2016.

== Early life and education ==
Kho was born on May 13, 1986, in Zamboanga City, to Antonio Kho and Wilfemia Tan. He took up master in public management at the University of the Philippines.

== Political career ==
In 2010, Kho elected as mayor of Cataingan where he served for two terms.

In 2016, Kho ran for representative for third district of Masbate but he lost to Scott Davies Lanete.

In 2019, Kho elected as representative for third district of Masbate after he beat Rizalina Seachon-Lanete over 41,853 votes.

== Personal life ==
He is married to Kristine Salve "Tintin" Hao-Kho, currently serving as mayor of Mandaon since 2022.

His half-brother, Richard Kho, currently serving as governor of Masbate since 2025.

His half-sister, Ara Kho, currently serving as mayor of Masbate City since 2025.

== Electoral history ==
Electoral history of Wilton Kho
Year	Office	Party	Votes received				Result
Year	Office	Party	Total	%	P.	Swing	Result
2010	Mayor of Cataingan	Lakas	16,911	—N/a	1st	—N/a	Won
2013	Mayor of Cataingan	Lakas	15,300	—N/a	1st	—N/a	Won
2016	Representative (Masbate–3rd)	Nacionalista	48,722	—N/a	2nd	—N/a	Lost
2019	Representative (Masbate–3rd)	PDP–Laban	94,366	—N/a	1st	—N/a	Won
2022	Representative (Masbate–3rd)	PDP–Laban	94,373	63.55%	1st	—N/a	Won
2025	Representative (Masbate–3rd)	Lakas	127,161	89.18%	1st	—N/a	Won
