= Sorsogon Provincial Board =

Legislative body of the province of Sorsogon, Philippines

Sorsogon Provincial Board Sangguniang Panlalawigan ng Sorsogon

Type
- Type: Unicameral
- Term limits: 3 terms (9 years)

Leadership
- Presiding Officer: Krunimar Antonio D. Escudero II, NPC since June 30, 2022

Structure
- Seats: 13 board members 1 ex officio presiding officer
- Political groups: NPC (11) Nonpartisan (2)
- Length of term: 3 years
- Authority: Local Government Code of the Philippines

Elections
- Voting system: Multiple non-transferable vote (regular members); Indirect election (ex officio members)
- Last election: May 12, 2025
- Next election: May 15, 2028

Meeting place
- Sorsogon Provincial Capitol, Sorsogon City

The Sorsogon Provincial Board is the Sangguniang Panlalawigan (provincial legislature) of the Philippine province of Sorsogon.

The members are elected via plurality-at-large voting: the province is divided into two districts, each having five seats. A voter votes up to five names, with the top five candidates per district being elected. The vice governor is the ex officio presiding officer, and only votes to break ties. The vice governor is elected via the plurality voting system province-wide.

The districts used in appropriation of members is coextensive with the legislative districts of Sorsogon.

Aside from the regular members, the board also includes the provincial federation presidents of the Liga ng mga Barangay (ABC, from its old name "Association of Barangay Captains"), the Sangguniang Kabataan (SK, youth councils) and the Philippine Councilors League (PCL).

== Apportionment ==
Elections	Seats per district		Ex officio seats	Total seats
Elections	1st	2nd	Ex officio seats	Total seats
2010–present	5	5	3	13

== List of members ==
=== Current members ===
These are the members after the 2025 local elections and 2023 barangay and SK elections

- Vice Governor: Krunimar Antonio D. Escudero II (NPC)

Seat	Board member	Party	Start of term	End of term
1st district	Maria O. Ravanilla	NPC	June 30, 2022	June 30, 2028
1st district	Edmundo A. Atutubo	NPC	June 30, 2019	June 30, 2028
1st district	Rommel John C. Mella	NPC	June 30, 2019	June 30, 2028
1st district	Luis C. Leosala Jr.	NPC	June 30, 2025	June 30, 2028
1st district	Fernando David H. Duran	NPC	June 30, 2025	June 30, 2028
2nd district	Ramil M. Robles	NPC	June 30, 2022	June 30, 2028
2nd district	Benito L. Doma	NPC	June 30, 2022	June 30, 2028
2nd district	Rolando R. Añonuevo	NPC	June 30, 2019	June 30, 2028
2nd district	Eduardo E. Ong Jr.	NPC	June 30, 2022	June 30, 2028
2nd district	Christian D. Lim	NPC	June 30, 2025	June 30, 2028
ABC	Jose Arturo Enano	Nonpartisan	July 30, 2018	January 2029
PCL	Ramon B. Escudero	NPC		June 30, 2028
SK	Karl Marx H. Lozada	Nonpartisan		January 2029

=== Vice governor ===
Election year	Name	Party	Ref.
2016	Ma. Esther E. Hamor	Independent	
2019	Wowo Fortes	NPC	
2022	Krunimar Antonio D. Escudero II	NPC	
2025	Krunimar Antonio D. Escudero II	NPC	

=== 1st district ===
- Population (2024):

Election year	Member (party)	Member (party)	Member (party)	Member (party)	Member (party)	Ref.
2016	Rebecca Aquino (Liberal)	John Ryan C. Dioneda (PDP–Laban)	Krunimar Antonio D. Escudero II (NPC)	Franco Eric O. Ravanilla (NPC)	Peter Joseph Ravanilla (UNA)	
2019	Edmundo A. Atutubo (NPC)	John Ryan C. Dioneda (NPC)	Krunimar Antonio D. Escudero II (NPC)	Franco Eric O. Ravanilla (NPC)	Rommel John C. Mella (NPC)	
2022	Edmundo A. Atutubo (NPC)	John Ryan C. Dioneda (NPC)	Ralph Walter R. Lubiano (NPC)	Maria O. Ravanilla (NPC)	Rommel John C. Mella (NPC)	
2025	Edmundo A. Atutubo (NPC)	Luis C. Leosala Jr. (NPC)	Fernando David H. Duran (NPC)	Maria O. Ravanilla (NPC)	Rommel John C. Mella (NPC)	

=== 2nd district ===
- Population (2024):

Election year	Member (party)	Member (party)	Member (party)	Member (party)	Member (party)	Ref.
2016	Arze G. Glipo (Liberal)	Renato Guban (Liberal)	Marnellie G. Ballesteros (Liberal)	Noel D. Hao (UNA)	Maria Teresa G. Fragata (UNA)	
2019	Arze G. Glipo (NPC)	Roland R. Añonuevo (NPC)	Marnellie G. Ballesteros-Robles (PDP–Laban)	John Paul E. Erlano (NPC)	Juan G. Guysayko (NPC)	
2022	Eduardo E. Ong Jr. (NPC)	Roland R. Añonuevo (NPC)	Ramil M. Robles (NPC)	Benito L. Doma (NPC)	Juan G. Guysayko (NPC)	
2025	Eduardo E. Ong Jr. (NPC)	Roland R. Añonuevo (NPC)	Ramil M. Robles (NPC)	Benito L. Doma (NPC)	Christian D. Lim (NPC)	
