= Masbate Provincial Board =

Legislative body of the province of Masbate, Philippines

Masbate Provincial Board Sangguniang Panlalawigan ng Masbate

Type
- Type: Unicameral
- Term limits: 3 terms (9 years)

Leadership
- Presiding Officer: Fernando P. Talisic, Lakas

Structure
- Seats: 13 board members 1 ex officio presiding officer
- Political groups: Lakas (8) PDP–Laban (2) TBD (1) Non-partisan (2)
- Length of term: 3 years
- Authority: Local Government Code of the Philippines

Elections
- Voting system: Multiple non-transferable vote (regular members); Indirect election (ex officio members)
- Last election: May 15, 2025
- Next election: 2028

Meeting place
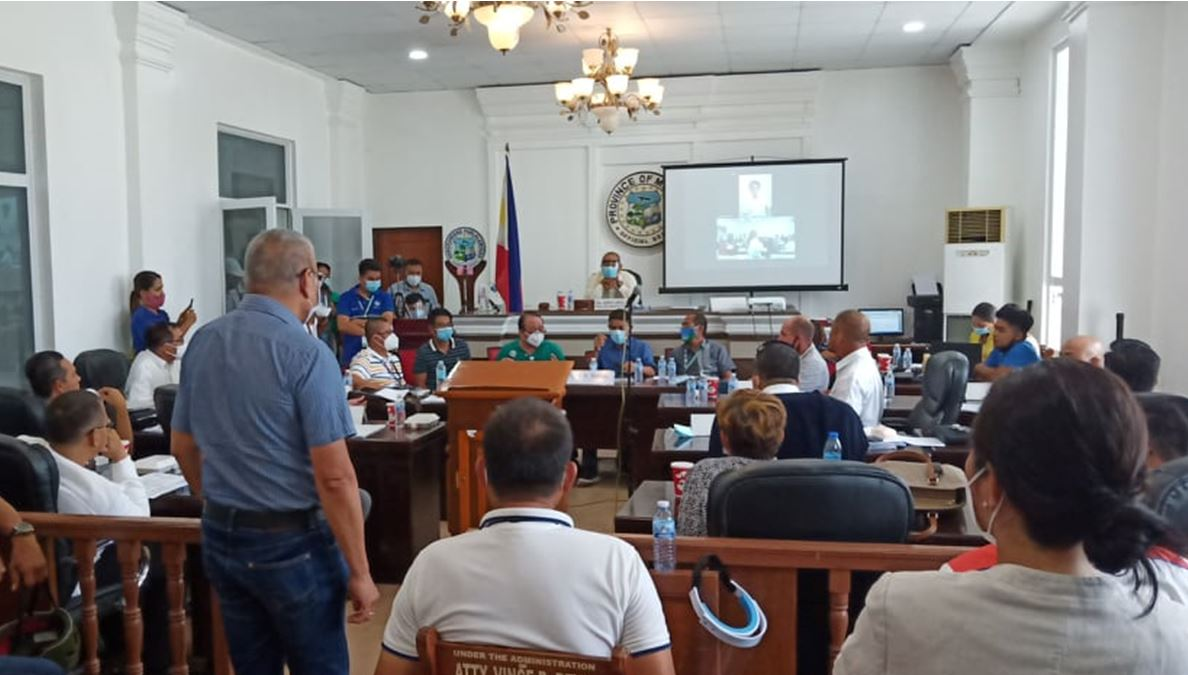
- Legislative Building, Provincial Capitol Compound, Masbate City, Masbate, Philippines

Website
- Masbate Provincial Board Official Website

The Masbate Provincial Board is the Sangguniang Panlalawigan (provincial legislature) of the Philippine province of Masbate.

The members are elected via plurality-at-large voting: the province is divided into three districts, the first district sending two members, and the second and third districts sending four members each to the provincial board; the number of candidates the electorate votes for and the number of winning candidates depends on the number of members their district sends. The vice governor is the ex officio presiding officer, and only votes to break ties. The vice governor is elected via the plurality voting system province-wide.

The districts used in appropriation of members is coextensive with the legislative districts of Masbate.

Aside from the regular members, the board also includes the provincial federation presidents of the Liga ng mga Barangay (ABC, from its old name "Association of Barangay Captains"), the Sangguniang Kabataan (SK, youth councils) and the Philippine Councilors League (PCL).

== Apportionment ==
Elections	Seats per district			Ex officio seats	Total seats
Elections	1st	2nd	3rd	Ex officio seats	Total seats
2010–present	2	4	4	3	13

== List of members ==
=== Current members ===
These are the members after the 2025 local elections and 2023 barangay and SK elections:

- Vice Governor: Fernando P. Talisic (Lakas-CMD)

Seat	Board member	Party	Start of term	End of term
1st district	Alfredo L. Alim Jr.	Lakas	June 30, 2022	June 30, 2028
1st district	Sotero C. Cantela	Lakas	June 30, 2022	June 30, 2028
2nd district	Vicente Homer B. Revil	Lakas	June 30, 2025	June 30, 2028
2nd district	Teddy L. Danao Jr.	Lakas	June 30, 2019	June 30, 2028
2nd district	Kristoffer Paul A. Espinosa	Lakas	June 30, 2019	June 30, 2028
2nd district	Allan B. Cos	PDP–Laban	June 30, 2019	June 30, 2028
3rd district	George A. Gonzales Jr.	Lakas	June 30, 2019	June 30, 2028
3rd district	Allan T. Lepasana	Lakas	June 30, 2022	June 30, 2028
3rd district	Nilda A. Tinegra	PDP–Laban	June 30, 2022	June 30, 2028
3rd district	Ansbert S. Son	Lakas	June 30, 2025	June 30, 2028
ABC		Nonpartisan	July 30, 2018	January 1, 2023
PCL			July 1, 2019	June 30, 2022
SK		Nonpartisan	June 8, 2018	January 1, 2023

=== Vice governor ===
Election year	Name	Party	Ref.
2016	Kaye C. Revil	NUP	
2019	Olga T. Kho	PDP–Laban	
2022	Olga T. Kho	PDP–Laban	
2025	Fernando P. Talisic	Lakas	

=== 1st district ===
- Population (2024):

Election year	Member (party)	Member (party)	Ref.
2016	Emilio Marc V. Barsaga (NUP)	Alfredo L. Alim, Jr. (NUP)	
2019	Emilio Marc V. Barsaga (NUP)	Diosdado Alim (PDP–Laban)	
2022	Sotero C. Cantela (PDP–Laban)	Alfredo L. Alim, Jr. (PDP–Laban)	
2025	Sotero C. Cantela (Lakas)	Alfredo L. Alim, Jr. (Lakas)	

=== 2nd district ===
- Population (2024):

Election year	Member (party)	Member (party)	Member (party)	Member (party)	Ref.
2016	Lovely Abapo (NPC)	Jamon Espares (NPC)	Dennis Placer (NUP)	Dionne Lopez (Liberal)	
2019	Teddy L. Danao, Jr. (Liberal)	Jamon Espares (PDP–Laban)	Kristoffer Paul A. Espinosa (PDP–Laban)	Allan Cos (PDP–Laban)	
2022	Teddy L. Danao, Jr. (PDP–Laban)	Rey Noel T. Amante (PDP–Laban)	Kristoffer Paul A. Espinosa (PDP–Laban)	Allan Cos (PDP–Laban)	
2025	Teddy L. Danao, Jr. (Lakas)	Vicente Homer B. Revil (Lakas)	Kristoffer Paul A. Espinosa (Lakas)	Allan Cos (PDP–Laban)	

=== 3rd district ===
- Population (2024):

Election year	Member (party)	Member (party)	Member (party)	Member (party)	Ref.
2016	Jayson R. Arevalo (NPC)	Randy Vasquez (NPC)	Albert Vincent Chu (NPC)	Boyboy Arregadas (NPC)	
2019	Jayson R. Arevalo (Independent)	Rudy Alvarez, Jr. (PDP–Laban)	George A. Gonzales, Jr. (PDP–Laban)	Angel Lanete (NPC)	
2022	Nilda A. Tinegra (PDP–Laban)	Rudy Alvarez, Jr. (PDP–Laban)	George A. Gonzales, Jr. (PDP–Laban)	Allan Lepasana (PDP–Laban)	
2025	Nilda A. Tinegra (PDP–Laban)	Ansbert S. Son (Lakas)	George A. Gonzales, Jr. (Lakas)	Allan Lepasana (Lakas)	
