= Jose Edwin Hamor =

Filipino businessman, politician, and current governor of Sorsogon (born 1959)

Jose Edwin "Boboy" Hamor
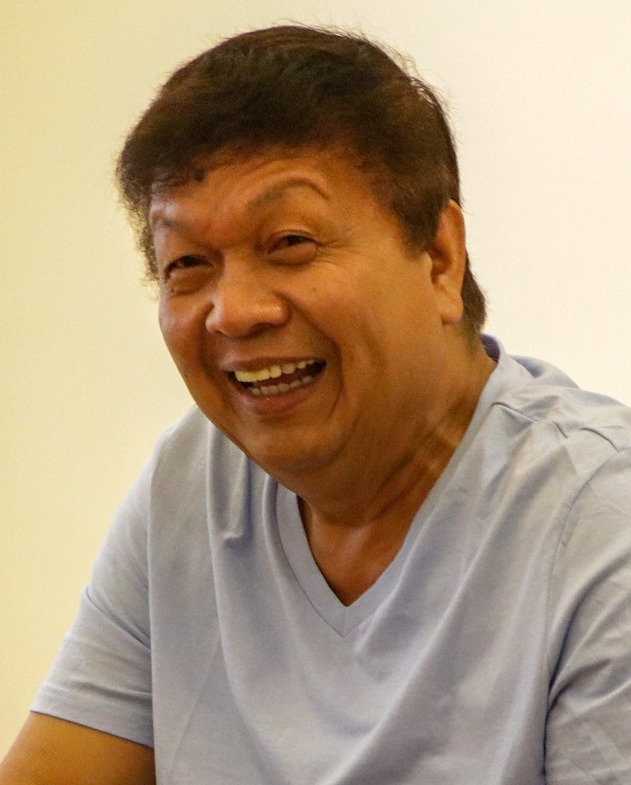

24th Governor of Sorsogon
- Incumbent
- Assumed office June 30, 2022
- Vice Governor: Krunimar Antonio Escudero II
- Preceded by: Francis Escudero

Mayor of Casiguran, Sorsogon
- In office June 30, 2019 – June 30, 2022
- In office June 30, 1998 – June 30, 2007

Personal details
- Born: Jose Edwin Brondial Hamor; September 11, 1959 (age 66) Casiguran, Sorsogon, Philippines
- Party: NPC (2018–present)
- Other political affiliations: Nacionalista (until 2007)
- Spouse: Ester Hamor
- Children: 3
- Occupation: Businessman

Jose Edwin "Boboy" Brondial Hamor (born September 11, 1959) is a Filipino politician currently serving as the Governor of Sorsogon.

== Early life ==
Hamor was born on September 11, 1959, on Casiguran, Sorsogon to Jose Huen Hamor and Dolores Buenviaje Brondial, He was raised in a family of three children, He took part-time jobs to pay for his tuition, He has a degree in Bachelor of Science in Civil Engineering from the Far Eastern University.

== Career ==
Hamor was the Chief executive officer of AREMAR Construction before being the Mayor of Casiguran from 1998 to 2007 and 2019 to 2022. He ran for Governor of Sorsogon, under the party Nationalist People's Coalition, he won with 285,888 votes or 72.81 percent. He is also the Chairman of the Regional Peace and Order Council (RPOC) of Bicol Region.

== Personal life ==
Hamor is married to Ester Hamor, the Mayor of Sorsogon City. He has three children with her. He was also considered to be related to Benjamin Diokno, but he refused the claims.
