= Richard Kho =

Filipino lawyer and politician

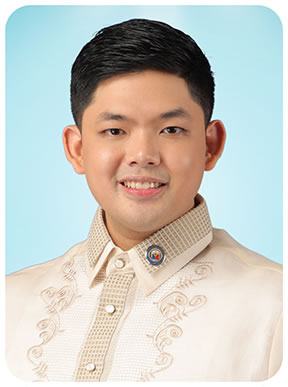
- Official portrait, 2022

22nd Governor of Masbate
- Incumbent
- Assumed office June 30, 2025
- Vice Governor: Fernando Talisic
- Preceded by: Antonio Kho

Member of the House of Representatives from Masbate's 1st District
- In office June 30, 2022 – June 30, 2025
- Preceded by: Narciso Bravo Jr.
- Succeeded by: Antonio Kho

Personal details
- Born: Richard Tingcungco Kho; December 31, 1996 (age 29) Pasig, Philippines
- Party: Lakas (2023–present)
- Other political affiliations: PDP–Laban (2021–2023)
- Relations: Ara Kho (sister); Wilton Kho (half-brother)
- Parent(s): Antonio Kho (father); Olga Kho (mother)
- Occupation: Lawyer, politician

Ricardo "Richard" Tingcungco Kho (born December 31, 1996) is a Filipino lawyer and politician who has served as Governor of Masbate since 2025. He was previously a member of the House of Representatives of the Philippines, represented the 1st District of Masbate from 2022 to 2025.

== Electoral history ==
Electoral history of Richard Kho
Year	Office	Party	Votes received				Result
Year	Office	Party	Total	%	P.	Swing	Result
2022	Representative (Masbate–1st)	PDP–Laban	57,770	59.34%	1st	—N/a	Won
2025	Governor of Masbate	Lakas	321,100	71.08%	1st	—N/a	Won

== See also ==
- List of current Philippine governors
