= Antonio Kho (politician) =

Filipino civil engineer and politician (born 1958)

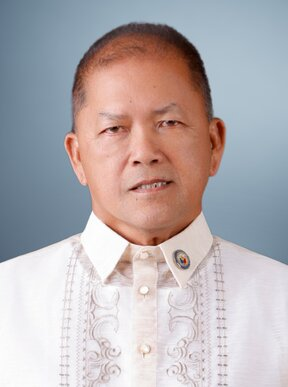
- Official portrait, 2025

Member of the House of Representatives from Masbate
- Incumbent
- Assumed office June 30, 2025
- Preceded by: Richard Kho
- Constituency: 1st district
- In office June 30, 2007 – June 30, 2013
- Preceded by: Emilio Espinosa Jr.
- Succeeded by: Elisa Olga Kho
- Constituency: 2nd district
- In office June 30, 1992 – June 30, 1995
- Preceded by: Moises Espinosa
- Succeeded by: Fausto Seachon Jr.
- Constituency: 3rd district

19th Governor of Masbate
- In office June 30, 2016 – June 30, 2025
- Vice Governor: Ara Kho (2019–2022); Elisa Olga Kho (2022–2025)
- Preceded by: Vicente Homer Revil
- Succeeded by: Richard Kho
- In office June 30, 1998 – June 30, 2007
- Preceded by: Emilio Espinosa Jr.
- Succeeded by: Elisa Olga Kho

Mayor of Cataingan
- In office February 2, 1988 – June 30, 1992

Personal details
- Born: Antonio Tero Kho; January 9, 1958 (age 68) Cataingan, Masbate, Philippines
- Party: Lakas (1992–1995; 2004–2015; 2024–present)
- Other political affiliations: PDP–Laban (2017–2024); Nacionalista (2015–2017); Reporma (1998–2004); Liberal (1995–1998)
- Spouse: Olga Kho
- Children: Wilton, Richard and Ara
- Occupation: Politician
- Profession: Civil engineer, businessman

Antonio Tero Kho (born January 9, 1958), also known as Tony Kho, is a Filipino politician currently serving as representative of the 1st District of Masbate since 2025. He has held various elective positions in Masbate, including governor, congressman, and mayor.

== Early life ==
Antonio Kho was born on January 9, 1958, in Cataingan, Masbate.

== Political career ==
Kho has had a long political career in Masbate, alternating between local and congressional posts.

He first entered Congress as representative of Masbate's 3rd district from 1992 to 1995. He later became governor of Masbate from 1998 to 2007 in three consecutive terms.

In 2007, he returned to Congress, this time representing Masbate's 2nd district until 2013. He then won the governorship again, serving from 2016 to 2025.

In 2025, he was elected as representative of Masbate's 1st district.

== Personal life ==
Kho is nicknamed "Tony" and hails from a political family in Masbate.

== Electoral history ==
=== 2025 ===
2025 Philippine House of Representatives elections
| Candidate | Party | Votes | % |
|---|---|---|---|
| Antonio Kho | Lakas–CMD | 70,214 | 100.00 |
| Total | | 70,214 | 100.00 |
| Valid votes | | 70,214 | 67.04 |
| Invalid/blank votes | | 34,518 | 32.96 |
| Total votes | | 104,732 | 100.00 |
| Registered voters/turnout | | 128,429 | 81.55 |
| Lakas–CMD hold | | | |
Source: Commission on Elections

=== 2022 ===
Masbate gubernatorial election
| Party | Candidate | Votes | % |
|---|---|---|---|
| PDP–Laban | Antonio Kho | 250,493 | 57.52% |
| NUP | Narciso Bravo Jr. | 185,001 | 42.48% |
| Total votes | | 435,494 | 100.00 |

=== 2019 ===
Masbate gubernatorial election
| Party | Candidate | Votes | % |
|---|---|---|---|
| PDP–Laban | Antonio Kho | 265,850 | 68.55 |
| NPC | Scott Davies Lanete | 121,985 | 31.45 |
| Total votes | | 387,835 | 100.00 |

=== 2016 ===
Masbate gubernatorial election
| Party | Candidate | Votes | % |
|---|---|---|---|
| Nacionalista | Antonio Kho | 117,047 | |
| NPC | Rizalina Seachon-Lanete | 106,300 | |
| NUP | Narciso Bravo Jr. | 101,894 | |
| KBL | Mercy Cabiles | 8,841 | |
| Total votes | | 334,082 | |

=== 2013 ===
Masbate gubernatorial election
| Party | Candidate | Votes | % |
|---|---|---|---|
| NPC | Rizalina Seachon-Lanete (incumbent) | 158,666 | 50.53 |
| Lakas | Antonio Kho | 124,454 | 39.63 |
| Liberal | Leo Casas | 26,998 | 8.60 |
| Independent | Romeo Alburo, Jr. | 3,896 | 1.24 |
| Total votes | | 314,014 | 100.00 |
| NPC hold | | | |

=== 2010 ===
2010 Philippine House of Representatives elections
| Candidate | Party | Votes | % |
|---|---|---|---|
| Antonio Kho (incumbent) | Lakas–Kampi–CMD | 68,300 | 58.61 |
| Darius Tuason Sr. | Nationalist People's Coalition | 48,232 | 41.39 |
| Total | | 116,532 | 100.00 |
| Valid votes | | 116,532 | 86.42 |
| Invalid/blank votes | | 18,304 | 13.58 |
| Total votes | | 134,836 | 100.00 |
| Lakas–Kampi–CMD hold | | | |
Source: Commission on Elections

=== 2007 ===
2007 Philippine House of Representatives elections
| Party | Candidate | Votes | % |
|---|---|---|---|
| Lakas | Antonio Kho | 48,364 | |
| KAMPI | Ma. Lourdes Espinosa | 34,685 | |
| PDSP | Ricardo Celera | 4,545 | |
| PDP–Laban | Leo Manlapas | 3,579 | |
| Invalid or blank votes | | | |
| Total votes | | | |
| Lakas hold | | | |

=== 2004 ===
Masbate gubernatorial election
| Candidate | Party | Votes | % |
|---|---|---|---|
| Antonio Kho | Lakas–CMD | 122,402 | 50.49 |
| Fausto Seachon Jr. | Nationalist People's Coalition | 119,478 | 49.29 |
| Sirnante Villar | Independent | 361 | 0.15 |
| Salem Abubakar | Independent | 172 | 0.07 |
| Total | | 242,413 | 100.00 |
| Lakas–CMD hold | | | |

=== 2001 ===
Masbate gubernatorial election
| Candidate | Party | Votes | % |
|---|---|---|---|
| Antonio Kho | Partido para sa Demokratikong Reporma | 113,578 | 53.99 |
| Orlando Danao | Lakas–NUCD–UMDP | 96,539 | 45.89 |
| Ricardo Riveral | Progressive Movement for the Devolution of Initiatives | 249 | 0.12 |
| Total | | 210,366 | 100.00 |
| Partido para sa Demokratikong Reporma hold | | | |

=== 1992 ===
1992 Philippine House of Representatives elections
| Candidate | Party | Votes | % |
|---|---|---|---|
| Antonio Kho | Lakas–NUCD | 31,095 | 49.19 |
| Moises Espinosa Jr. | Independent | 23,825 | 37.69 |
| Alfonso Alino Sr. | Lapiang Manggagawa | 4,554 | 7.20 |
| Regino Tambago | Laban ng Demokratikong Pilipino | 2,427 | 3.84 |
| Vicente Lim Sr. | Independent | 733 | 1.16 |
| Floresto Arizala | Nacionalista Party | 559 | 0.88 |
| Constancio Salubre | Philippine Republican Reformist Party | 22 | 0.03 |
| Total | | 63,215 | 100.00 |
Source: Commission on Elections
