= Ara Kho =

Filipino politician

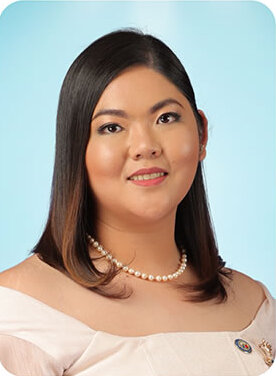
- Official portrait, 2022

Mayor of Masbate City
- Incumbent
- Assumed office June 30, 2025

Member of the Philippine House of Representatives from Masbate's 2nd district
- In office June 30, 2022 – June 30, 2025
- Preceded by: Olga Kho
- Succeeded by: Olga Kho

Personal details
- Party: Lakas (2024–present)
- Other political affiliations: PDP–Laban (2021–2024)
- Relations: Richard Kho (brother); Wilton Kho (half-brother)
- Parent(s): Antonio Kho (father); Olga Kho (mother)

Olga "Ara" Tingcungco Kho is a Filipino politician who currently serves as Mayor of Masbate City since 2025. She served as the representative of 2nd District of Masbate from 2022 to 2025. She is the daughter of Antonio Kho and Olga Kho.

== Political career ==
She got elected as a representative of Masbate at the House of Representatives in the 2022 House of Representatives elections.

Ara Kho ran under the Lakas–CMD party in the 2025 election and was elected mayor of Masbate City.

== Electoral history ==
Electoral history of Ara Kho
Year	Office	Party	Votes received				Result
Year	Office	Party	Total	%	P.	Swing	Result
2022	Representative (Masbate–2nd)	PDP–Laban	123,160	73.68%	1st	—N/a	Won
2025	Mayor of Masbate City	Lakas	41,391	48.75%	1st	—N/a	Won

== See also ==
- List of female members of the House of Representatives of the Philippines
