= Wowo Fortes =

Filipino lawyer and politician

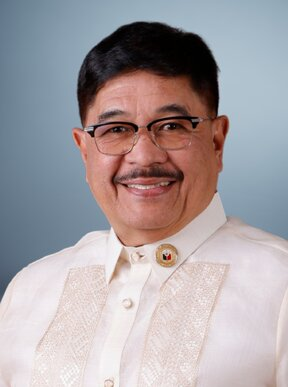
- Official portrait, 2025

Member of the Philippine House of Representatives from Sorsogon's 2nd district
- Incumbent
- Assumed office June 30, 2022
- Preceded by: none ; office last held by Bernardita Ramos

Vice Governor of Sorsogon
- In office June 30, 2019 – June 30, 2022
- Governor: Francis Escudero
- Preceded by: Ester Hamor
- Succeeded by: Krunimar Antonio Escudero II

Mayor of Barcelona, Sorsogon
- In office June 30, 2010 – June 30, 2019
- Preceded by: Salvador Nee Estuye
- Succeeded by: Cynthia Falcotelo-Fortes

Personal details
- Born: Manuel Laurio Fortes, Jr. February 24, 1965 (age 61) Sorsogon, Sorsogon, Philippines
- Party: NPC (2018–present)
- Other political affiliations: UNA (2012–2018); Nacionalista (2009–2012)
- Spouse: Cynthia Falcotelo-Fortes
- Children: Jud Gabriel Fortes
- Occupation: Lawyer

Wowo Fortes (born Manuel Laurio Fortes Jr.; February 24, 1965) is a Filipino lawyer and politician serving as the Representative of the Province of Sorsogon’s 2nd district since July 2022.

== Career and affiliations ==
Prior to his political career, Fortes was a practicing lawyer. He served as the vice governor of Sorsogon from 2019 to 2022, and mayor of Barcelona, Sorsogon from 2010 to 2019.

In the 2019 elections, Fortes was Francis Escudero's running mate in the gubernatorial election under the Nationalist People's Coalition (NPC). In the 2022 elections, Fortes and the NPC won all provincial offices, including the 2nd district House representative seat Fortes ran at.

== Legislation ==
Fortes contributed to the drafting of Republic Act No. 11964, a bill relating to income classification of local government units (LGUs). He was a coauthor of House Bill No. 3458: Community-Driven Development (CDD) Bill.
