= Governor of Masbate =

Local chief executive

- Gobernador ng Lalawigan ng Masbate
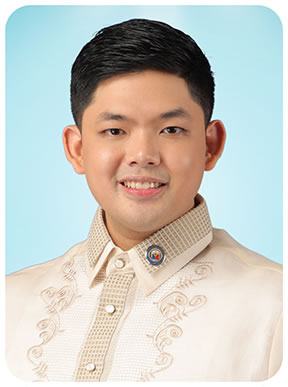
- Incumbent; Richard Kho since June 30, 2025
- Style: The Honorable
- Appointer: Elected via popular vote
- Term length: 3 years
- Inaugural holder: Vicente Triviño
- Formation: 1898

The governor of Masbate (Filipino: Punong Panlalawigan ng Masbate), is the chief executive of the provincial government of Masbate.

== List of governors of Masbate (1898-present) ==
No.	Image	Governor	Term
1		Vicente Triviño	1898-1900
2		Bonifacio Serrano	1900-1905
3		Isabelo Burdeos	1905-1908
4		Enrique Legaspi	1916-1919
5		Narciso Medina	1919-1922
6		Fausto Bayot	1922-1924
7		Jose Zurbito	1924-1927
8		Teofisto Cordova	1927-1930
9		Genaro Briz	1930-1933
10		Domingo Magbalon	1933-1936
11		Mateo Pecson	1936-1943
12		Jose Almario	1944
13		Rafael Letada	1946-1948
14		Vicente Quisumbing	1952-1955
15		Jesus Almero	1955-1964
16		Manuel Pecson	1964-1968
17		Moises Espinosa	1968-1975
18		Emilio Espinosa Jr.	1975-1978
-		Col. Cornelio Barrameda (OIC)	1978-1980
(18)		Emilio Espinosa Jr.	1980-1986
-		Romeo Mijares (OIC)	1986
-		Nestor Esperilla (OIC)	1986
-		Jolly Fernandez (OIC)	1986-1987
-		Juan Sanchez	1987-1988
(18)		Emilio Espinosa Jr.	1988-1998
19		Antonio Kho	1998-2007
20		Olga Kho	2007-2010
21		Rizalina Seachon-Lanete	2010-2015
-		Vicente Homer Revil	2015-2016
(19)		Antonio Kho	2016-2025
22		Richard Kho	2025-present
