= Olga Kho =

Filipino politician (born 1956)

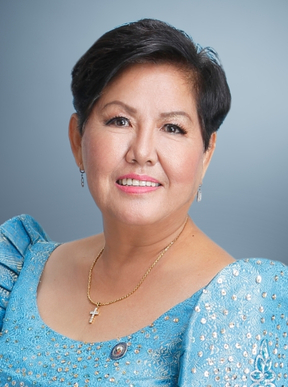
- Official portrait, 2025

Member of the Philippine House of Representatives from Masbate's 2nd District
- Incumbent
- Assumed office June 30, 2025
- Preceded by: Ara Kho
- In office June 30, 2013 – June 30, 2022
- Preceded by: Antonio Kho
- Succeeded by: Ara Kho

Vice Governor of Masbate
- In office June 30, 2022 – June 30, 2025
- Governor: Antonio Kho
- Preceded by: Ara Kho
- Succeeded by: Fernando Talisic

20th Governor of Masbate
- In office June 30, 2007 – June 30, 2010
- Vice Governor: Vicente Homer Revil
- Preceded by: Antonio Kho
- Succeeded by: Rizalina Lanete

Personal details
- Born: Elisa Tingcungco; July 1, 1956 (age 70)
- Party: Lakas (2004–2015; 2023–present)
- Other political affiliations: PDP–Laban (2016–2023); Nacionalista (2015–2016); Reporma (1998–2004)
- Spouse: Antonio Kho
- Children: Richard and Ara
- Occupation: Physician, Politician

Elisa "Olga" Tingcungco Kho (born July 1, 1956) is a Filipino politician and medical doctor who is currently serving in the House of Representatives of the Philippines as the Representative of Masbate's 2nd congressional district since 2025, a position she previously held from 2013 to 2022. She previously served as vice governor of Masbate from 2022 to 2025. She served as the first female governor of Masbate from 2007 to 2010. She is married to the current Representative Antonio Kho. Part of a political family in the province, the couple's children, Ara and Richard are also politicians.
