= List of electric distribution utilities in the Philippines =

This is a complete list of electric utilities in the Philippines. There are 152 electric utilities in the country.

== List ==
List of electric utilities in the Philippines
Electric utility	Acronym	Type (Note: Classification of electric utilities in the Philippines: EC-CDA – Electric utilities under the Cooperative Development Authority; LGUOU – Local government unit–owned utilities; MPC – Multi-purpose cooperatives; NEA-EC – Electric utilities under the National Electrification Administration; PIOU – Private investor–owned utilities or privately-/independently-owned utilities; SPUG-EC – Small power utilities group; SPUG-EC CDA – SPUGs under the Cooperative Development Authority)	Grid	No. of customers	Areas served
Abra Electric Cooperative	ABRECO	EC-CDA	Luzon	47,755	List (27): Bangued; Boliney; Bucay; Bucloc; Daguioman; Danglas; Dolores; La Paz; Lacub; Lagangilang; Lagayan; Langiden; Licuan-Baay; Luba; Malibcong; Manabo; Peñarrubia; Pidigan; Pilar; Sallapadan; San Isidro; San Juan; San Quintin; Tayum; Tineg; Tubo; Villaviciosa
Agusan del Norte Electric Cooperative	ANECO	NEA-EC	Mindanao	144,963	List (12): Buenavista; Butuan; Cabadbaran; Carmen; Jabonga; Kitcharao; Las Nieves; Magallanes; Nasipit; Remedios T. Romualdez; Santiago; Tubay
Agusan del Sur Electric Cooperative	ASELCO	NEA-EC	Mindanao	130,795	List (14): Bayugan; Bunawan; Esperanza; La Paz; Loreto; Prosperidad; Rosario; San Francisco; San Luis; Santa Josefa; Sibagat; Talacogon; Trento; Veruela
Aklan Electric Cooperative	AKELCO	NEA-EC	Visayas	139,874	List (20): Altavas; Balete; Banga; Batan; Buruanga; Ibajay; Kalibo; Lezo; Libacao; Libertad; Madalag; Makato; Malay; Malinao; Nabas; New Washington; Numancia; Pandan; Sapian; Tangalan
Albay Electric Cooperative (Note: Also known as Albay Power Energy Corporation)	ALECO/APEC	NEA-EC	Luzon	186,911	List (18): Bacacay; Camalig; Daraga; Guinobatan; Jovellar; Legazpi; Libon; Ligao; Malilipot; Malinao; Manito; Oas; Pio Duran; Polangui; Rapu-Rapu (Note: Off-the-grid); Santo Domingo; Tabaco; Tiwi
Angeles Electric Corporation	AEC	PIOU	Luzon	118,190	List (2): Angeles City; Mabalacat (Note: Some areas only)
Antique Electric Cooperative	ANTECO	NEA-EC	Visayas	104,349	List (16): Anini-y; Barbaza; Belison; Bugasong; Caluya; Culasi; Hamtic; Laua-an; Patnongon; San Jose de Buenavista; San Remigio; Sebaste; Sibalom; Tibiao; Tobias Fornier; Valderrama
Aurora Electric Cooperative	AURELCO	NEA-EC	Luzon	50,118	List (10): Alfonso Castañeda; Baler; Casiguran; Dilasag; Dinalungan; Dinapigue; Dingalan; Dipaculao; Maria Aurora; San Luis
Balamban Enerzone Corporation	BEZ	PIOU	Visayas	31	List (1): Balamban (Note: West Cebu Industrial Park)
Bantayan Electric Cooperative	BANELCO	SPUG-EC	Visayas	31,369	List (3): Bantayan; Madridejos; Santa Fe
Banton Electric System (Note: Co-managed with Romblon Electric Cooperative)	Banton	LGUOU	Luzon	1,508	List (1): Banton
Basilan Electric Cooperative	BASELCO	SPUG-EC	Mindanao	30,704	List (13): Akbar; Al-Barka; Hadji Mohammad Ajul; Hadji Muhtamad; Isabela; Lamitan; Lantawan; Maluso; Sumisip; Tabuan-Lasa; Tipo-Tipo; Tuburan; Ungkaya Pukan
Batanes Electric Cooperative	BATANELCO	SPUG-EC	Luzon	6,595	List (6): Basco; Itbayat; Ivana; Mahatao; Sabtang; Uyugan
Batangas I Electric Cooperative	BATELEC I	NEA-EC	Luzon	165,856	List (12): Agoncillo; Balayan; Calaca; Calatagan; Lemery; Lian; Nasugbu; San Luis; San Nicolas; Santa Teresita; Taal; Tuy
Batangas II Electric Cooperative	BATELEC II	NEA-EC	Luzon	272,211	List (18): Alitagtag; Balete; Batangas City; Cuenca; Laurel; Lipa; Lobo; Mabini; Malvar; Mataasnakahoy; Padre Garcia; Rosario; San Jose; San Juan; Talisay; Tanauan; Taysan; Tingloy
Benguet Electric Cooperative	BENECO	NEA-EC	Luzon	192,684	List (14): Atok; Baguio; Bakun; Bokod; Buguias; Itogon; Kabayan; Kapangan; Kibungan; La Trinidad; Mankayan; Sablan; Tuba; Tublay
Biliran Electric Cooperative	BILECO	NEA-EC	Visayas	35,503	List (7): Almeria; Biliran; Cabucgayan; Caibiran; Culaba; Kawayan; Naval
Bohol I Electric Cooperative	BOHECO I	NEA-EC	Visayas	153,229	List (26): Alburquerque; Antequera; Baclayon (Note: Some areas are off-the-grid); Balilihan; Batuan; Bilar; Calape; Carmen; Catigbian; Clarin; Corella; Cortes; Dauis; Dimiao; Inabanga; Lila; Loay; Loboc; Loon; Maribojoc; Panglao; Sagbayan; San Isidro; Sevilla; Sikatuna; Tubigon
Bohol II Electric Cooperative	BOHECO II	NEA-EC	Visayas	124,345	List (21): Alicia; Anda; Bien Unido; Buenavista; Candijay; Dagohoy; Danao; Duero; Garcia Hernandez; Getafe; Guindulman; Jagna; Mabini; Pilar; President Carlos P. Garcia; San Miguel; Sierra Bullones; Talibon; Trinidad; Ubay; Valencia
Bohol Light Company	BLCI	PIOU	Visayas	21,353	List (1): Tagbilaran
Bukidnon II Electric Cooperative	BUSECO	NEA-EC	Mindanao	97,715	List (10): Baungon; Cabanglasan; Impasugong; Lantapan; Libona; Malaybalay; Malitbog; Manolo Fortich; Sumilao; Talakag
Bumbaran Electric Cooperative	Bumbaran	LGUOU	Mindanao	—	List (1): Amai Manabilang
Busuanga Island Electric Cooperative	BISELCO	SPUG-EC	Luzon	13,293	List (4): Busuanga; Coron; Culion; Linapacan
Cabanatuan Electric Corporation	CELCOR	PIOU	Luzon	77,663	List (1): Cabanatuan
Cagayan Electric Power and Light Company	CEPALCO	PIOU	Mindanao	148,500	List (4): Cagayan de Oro; Jasaan; Tagoloan; Villanueva
Cagayan I Electric Cooperative	CAGELCO I	NEA-EC	Luzon	137,196	List (12): Alcala; Amulung; Baggao; Enrile; Iguig; Peñablanca; Piat; Rizal; Santo Niño; Solana; Tuao; Tuguegarao
Cagayan II Electric Cooperative	CAGELCO II	NEA-EC	Luzon	122,078	List (20): Abulug; Allacapan; Aparri; Ballesteros; Buguey; Camalaniugan; Claveria; Flora; Gattaran; Gonzaga; Lal-lo; Lasam; Luna; Pamplona; Pudtol; Sanchez-Mira; Santa Ana; Santa Marcela; Santa Praxedes; Santa Teresita
Cagayan de Sulu Electric Cooperative	CASELCO	NEA-EC	Mindanao	—	List (2): Mapun; Turtle Islands
Camarines Norte Electric Cooperative	CANORECO	NEA-EC	Luzon	102,289	List (12): Basud; Capalonga; Daet; Jose Panganiban; Labo; Mercedes; Paracale; San Lorenzo Ruiz; San Vicente; Santa Elena; Talisay; Vinzons
Camarines Sur I Electric Cooperative	CASURECO I	NEA-EC	Luzon	81,468	List (11): Cabusao; Camaligan; Del Gallego; Gainza; Libmanan; Lupi; Pamplona; Pasacao; Ragay; San Fernando; Sipocot
Camarines Sur II Electric Cooperative	CASURECO II	NEA-EC	Luzon	107,076	List (10): Bombon; Calabanga; Canaman; Magarao; Milaor; Minalabac; Naga; Pili; Siruma; Tinambac
Camarines Sur III Electric Cooperative	CASURECO III	NEA-EC	Luzon	81,454	List (7): Baao; Balatan; Bato; Buhi; Bula; Iriga; Nabua
Camarines Sur IV Electric Cooperative	CASURECO IV	NEA-EC	Luzon	58,137	List (9): Caramoan; Garchitorena; Goa; Lagonoy; Ocampo; Presentacion; San Jose; Sagñay; Tigaon
Camiguin Electric Cooperative	CAMELCO	NEA-EC	Mindanao	23,800	List (5): Catarman; Guinsiliban; Mahinog; Mambajao; Sagay
Camotes Electric Cooperative	CELCO	SPUG-EC	Visayas	23,707	List (4): Pilar; Poro; San Francisco; Tudela
Capiz Electric Cooperative	CAPELCO	NEA-EC	Visayas	154,065	List (17): Cuartero; Dao; Dumalag; Dumarao; Ivisan; Jamindan; Ma-ayon; Mambusao; Panay; Panitan; Pilar; Pontevedra; President Roxas; Roxas; Sapian; Sigma; Tapaz
Cebu I Electric Cooperative	CEBECO I	NEA-EC	Visayas	138,071	List (18): Alcantara; Alcoy; Alegria; Argao; Badian; Barili; Boljoon; Carcar; Dalaguete; Dumanjug; Ginatilan; Malabuyoc; Moalboal; Oslob; Ronda; Samboan; Santander; Sibonga
Cebu II Electric Cooperative	CEBECO II	NEA-EC	Visayas	151,162	List (13): Bogo; Borbon; Carmen; Catmon; Compostela; Daanbantayan; Danao; Medellin; San Remigio; Sogod; Tabogon; Tabuelan; Tuburan
Cebu III Electric Cooperative	CEBECO III	NEA-EC	Visayas	93,612	List (5): Aloguinsan; Asturias; Balamban; Pinamungajan; Toledo
Central Pangasinan Electric Cooperative	CENPELCO	NEA-EC	Luzon	219,705	List (15): Aguilar; Alcala; Basista; Bautista; Bayambang; Binmaley; Bugallon; Labrador; Lingayen; Malasiqui; Mangaldan; Mangatarem; San Carlos; Sual; Urbiztondo
Clark Electric Distribution Corporation	CEDC	PIOU	Luzon	2,276	List (5): Angeles City (Note: Clark Freeport and Special Economic Zone); Bamban; Capas; Mabalacat; Porac
Concepcion Electric System (Note: Co-managed with Romblon Electric Cooperative)	Concepcion	LGUOU	Luzon	1,267	List (1): Concepcion
Corcuera Electric System (Note: Co-managed with Romblon Electric Cooperative)	Corcuera	LGUOU	Luzon	—	List (1): Corcuera
Cotabato Electric Cooperative	COTELCO	NEA-EC	Mindanao	138,167	List (12): Antipas; Arakan; Banisilan; Carmen; Kabacan; Kidapawan; Magpet; Makilala; Matalam; M'lang; President Roxas; Tulunan
Cotabato Electric Cooperative – PPALMA	COTELCO – PPALMA	NEA-EC	Mindanao	80,274	List (6): Alamada; Aleosan; Libungan; Midsayap; Pigcawayan; Pikit
Cotabato Light and Power Company	CLPC	PIOU	Mindanao	41,681	List (3): Cotabato City; Datu Odin Sinsuat; Sultan Kudarat
Dagupan Electric Corporation	DECORP	PIOU	Luzon	118,062	List (7): Calasiao; Dagupan; Manaoag; San Carlos (Note: Bolingit and Cruz); San Fabian; San Jacinto; Santa Barbara
Davao Light and Power Company	DLPC	PIOU	Mindanao	404,574	List (16): Arakan; Asuncion; Braulio E. Dujali; Carmen; Davao City; Kapalong; Kitaotao; New Corella; Panabo; Samal (Note: Talikud Island is off the grid.); Santa Cruz (Note: Inawayan); Santo Tomas; Sawata; Tagum; Talaingod
Davao Oriental Electric Cooperative	DORECO	NEA-EC	Mindanao	84,297	List (11): Banaybanay; Baganga; Boston; Caraga; Cateel; Governor Generoso; Lupon; Manay; Mati; San Isidro; Tarragona
Davao del Sur Electric Cooperative	DASURECO	NEA-EC	Mindanao	157,882	List (15): Bansalan; Digos; Don Marcelino; Hagonoy; Jose Abad Santos; Kiblawan; Magsaysay; Malalag; Matanao; Malita; Padada; Santa Cruz; Santa Maria; Sarangani; Sulop
Dinagat Island Electric Cooperative	DIELCO	SPUG-EC	Mindanao	24,770	List (7): Basilisa; Cagdianao; Dinagat; Libjo; Loreto; San Jose; Tubajon
Don Orestes Romualdez Electric Cooperative	DORELCO	NEA-EC	Visayas	70,828	List (13): Abuyog; Burauen; Dagami; Dulag; Javier; Julita; La Paz; MacArthur; Mahaplag; Mayorga; Tabontabon; Tanauan; Tolosa
Eastern Samar Electric Cooperative	ESAMELCO	NEA-EC	Visayas	88,841	List (23): Arteche; Balangiga; Balangkayan; Borongan; Can-avid; Dolores; General MacArthur; Giporlos; Guiuan; Hernani; Jipapad; Lawaan; Llorente; Maslog; Maydolong; Mercedes; Oras; Quinapondan; Salcedo; San Julian; San Policarpo; Sulat; Taft
First Bay Power Corporation	FBPC	LGUOU	Luzon	23,357	List (1): Bauan
First Bukidnon Electric Cooperative	FIBECO	NEA-EC	Mindanao	139,683	List (14): Amai Manabilang; Damulog; Dangcagan; Don Carlos; Kadingilan; Kalilangan; Kibawe; Kitaotao; Maramag; Pangantucan; Quezon; San Fernando; Valencia; Wao
First Catanduanes Electric Cooperative	FICELCO	SPUG-EC	Luzon	51,441	List (11): Bagamanoc; Baras; Bato; Caramoran; Gigmoto; Pandan; Panganiban; San Andres; San Miguel; Viga; Virac
First Laguna Electric Cooperative	FLECO	NEA-EC	Luzon	70,971	List (11): Cavinti; Famy; Kalayaan; Lumban; Mabitac; Paete; Pagsanjan; Pakil; Pangil; Santa Maria; Siniloan
Guimaras Electric Cooperative	GUIMELCO	NEA-EC	Visayas	33,796	List (5): Buenavista; Jordan; Nueva Valencia; San Lorenzo; Sibunag
Hilabaan Fishermen's Multi-Purpose Cooperative	HFMPC	MPC	Visayas	—	List (1): Dolores, Eastern Samar (Note: Hilabaan)
Ibaan Electric Corporation	IEC	PIOU	Luzon	13,913	List (3): Ibaan; Lipa; San Jose
Ifugao Electric Cooperative	IFELCO	NEA-EC	Luzon	37,201	List (11): Aguinaldo; Alfonso Lista; Asipulo; Banaue; Hingyon; Hungduan; Kiangan; Lagawe; Lamut; Mayoyao; Tinoc
Iligan Light and Power	ILPI	PIOU	Mindanao	68,585	List (1): Iligan
Ilocos Norte Electric Cooperative	INEC	NEA-EC	Luzon	163,921	List (23): Adams; Bacarra; Badoc; Bangui; Banna; Batac; Burgos; Carasi; Currimao; Dingras; Dumalneg; Laoag; Marcos; Nueva Era; Pagudpud; Paoay; Pasuquin; Piddig; Pinili; San Nicolas; Sarrat; Solsona; Vintar
Ilocos Sur Electric Cooperative	ISECO	NEA-EC	Luzon	174,674	List (34): Alilem; Banayoyo; Bantay; Burgos; Cabugao; Candon; Caoayan; Cervantes; Galimuyod; Gregorio del Pilar; Lidlidda; Magsingal; Nagbukel; Narvacan; Quirino; Salcedo; San Emilio; San Esteban; San Ildefonso; San Juan; San Vicente; Santa Catalina; Santa Cruz; Santa Lucia; Santa Maria; Santa; Santiago; Santo Domingo; Sigay; Sinait; Sugpon; Suyo; Tagudin; Vigan
Iloilo I Electric Cooperative	ILECO I	NEA-EC	Visayas	138,155	List (15): Alimodian; Cabatuan; Guimbal; Igbaras; Leganes; Leon; Maasin; Miagao; Oton; Pavia; San Joaquin; San Miguel; Santa Barbara; Tigbauan; Tubungan
Iloilo II Electric Cooperative	ILECO II	NEA-EC	Visayas	131,295	List (15): Badiangan; Barotac Nuevo; Bingawan; Calinog; Dingle; Dueñas; Dumangas; Janiuay; Lambunao; Mina; New Lucena; Passi; Pototan; San Enrique; Zarraga
Iloilo III Electric Cooperative	ILECO III	NEA-EC	Visayas	83,649	List (13): Ajuy; Anilao; Balasan; Banate; Barotac Viejo; Batad; Carles; Concepcion; Estancia; Lemery; San Dionisio; San Rafael; Sara
Isabela I Electric Cooperative	ISELCO I	NEA-EC	Luzon	197,525	List (15): Alicia; Angadanan; Cabatuan; Cauayan; Cordon; Echague; Jones; Luna; Ramon; Reina Mercedes; San Agustin; San Guillermo; San Isidro; San Mateo; Santiago
Isabela II Electric Cooperative	ISELCO II	EC-CDA	Luzon	154,858 (Note: As of 2015)	List (21): Aurora; Benito Soliven; Burgos; Cabagan; Delfin Albano; Divilacan; Gamu; Ilagan; Maconacon; Mallig; Naguilian; Palanan; Quezon; Quirino; Roxas; San Manuel; San Mariano; San Pablo; Santa Maria; Santo Tomas; Tumauini
Kalinga-Apayao Electric Cooperative	KAELCO	NEA-EC	Luzon	58,405	List (9): Balbalan; Conner; Lubuagan; Pasil; Pinukpuk; Rizal; Tabuk; Tanudan; Tinglayan
La Union Electric Company	LUECO	PIOU	Luzon	47,337	List (3): Bauang; San Fernando; San Juan
La Union Electric Cooperative	LUELCO	NEA-EC	Luzon	143,107	List (24): Agoo; Aringay; Bacnotan; Bagulin; Balaoan; Bangar; Bauang; Burgos; Caba; Luna; Naguilian; Pozorrubio; Pugo; Rosario; San Fabian; San Fernando; San Gabriel; San Jacinto; San Juan; Santo Tomas; Santol; Sison; Sudipen; Tubao
Lanao del Norte Electric Cooperative	LANECO	NEA-EC	Mindanao	83,418	List (18): Bacolod; Balo-i; Baroy; Kapatagan; Kauswagan; Kolambugan; Lala; Linamon; Magsaysay; Maigo; Matungao; Munai; Poona Piagapo; Salvador; Sapad; Sultan Naga Dimaporo; Tangcal; Tubod
Lanao del Sur Electric Cooperative	LASURECO	NEA-EC	Mindanao	51,401 (Note: As of 2016)	List (40): Bacolod-Kalawi; Balabagan; Balindong; Balo-i; Bayang; Binidayan; Buadiposo-Buntong; Bubong; Butig; Calanogas; Ditsaan-Ramain; Ganassi; Kapai; Kapatagan; Lumba-Bayabao; Lumbaca-Unayan; Lumbatan; Lumbayanague; Madalum; Madamba; Maguing; Malabang; Marantao; Marogong; Masiu; Mulondo; Pagayawan; Pantar; Pantao Ragat; Piagapo; Picong; Poona Bayabao; Pualas; Saguiaran; Sultan Dumalondong; Tagoloan; Tamparan; Taraka; Tubaran; Tugaya
Leyte II Electric Cooperative	LEYECO II	NEA-EC	Visayas	69,481	List (3): Babatngon; Palo; Tacloban
Leyte III Electric Cooperative	LEYECO III	NEA-EC	Visayas	59,549	List (9): Alangalang; Barugo; Capoocan; Carigara; Jaro; Pastrana; San Miguel; Santa Fe; Tunga
Leyte IV Electric Cooperative	LEYECO IV	NEA-EC	Visayas	72,585	List (6): Bato; Baybay; Hilongos; Hindang; Inopacan; Matalom
Leyte V Electric Cooperative	LEYECO V	NEA-EC	Visayas	123,746	List (12): Albuera; Calubian; Isabel; Kananga; Leyte; Matag-ob; Merida; Ormoc; Palompon; San Isidro; Tabango; Villaba
Lima Enerzone Corporation	LEZ	—	—	767	List (2): Lipa (Note: Lima Technology Center – Special Economic Zone); Malvar
Lubang Electric Cooperative	LUBELCO	SPUG-EC	Luzon	6,592	List (2): Looc; Lubang
Mactan Electric Company	MECO	PIOU	Visayas	93,778	List (2): Cordova; Lapu-Lapu City
Mactan Enerzone Corporation	MEZ	PIOU	Visayas	85	List (1): Lapu-Lapu City (Note: Mactan Economic Zone II)
Maguindanao Electric Cooperative	MAGELCO	NEA-EC	Mindanao	42,612	List (30): Ampatuan; Barira; Buldon; Datu Abdullah Sangki; Datu Anggal Midtimbang; Datu Blah T. Sinsuat; Datu Hoffer Ampatuan; Datu Montawal; Datu Odin Sinsuat; Datu Piang; Datu Salibo; Datu Saudi Ampatuan; Datu Unsay; Guindulungan; Kabuntalan; Mamasapano; Matanog; Northern Kabuntalan; Pagalungan; Parang; Rajah Buayan; Shariff Aguak; Shariff Saydona Mustapha; South Upi; Sultan Kudarat; Sultan Mastura; Sultan sa Barongis; Talayan; Talitay; Upi
Malvar Enerzone Corporation	MALVEZ	—	—	2	List (1): Malvar (Note: Light Industry and Science Park IV)
Manila Electric Company	MERALCO	PIOU	Luzon	6,612,523	List (114): Alaminos; Alfonso; Amadeo; Angat; Angono; Antipolo; Apalit (Note: Balucuc and Calantipe); Bacoor; Balagtas; Baras, Rizal; Batangas City; Bay; Biñan; Binangonan; Bocaue; Bulakan; Bustos; Cabuyao; Cainta; Calaca (Note: Cahil); Calamba; Calauan; Caloocan; Calumpit; Candaba; Candelaria; Cardona; Carmona; Cavite City; Dasmariñas; Dolores; General Emilio Aguinaldo; General Mariano Alvarez; General Trias; Guiguinto; Hagonoy; Imus; Indang; Jalajala; Kawit; Las Piñas; Laurel (Note: Niyugan and Dayap Itaas); Liliw; Los Baños; Lucban; Lucena; Luisiana; Magallanes; Magdalena; Majayjay; Makati; Malabon; Malolos; Mandaluyong; Manila; Maragondon; Marikina; Marilao; Mauban; Mendez; Meycauayan; Morong; Muntinlupa; Nagcarlan; Naic; Navotas; Norzagaray; Noveleta; Obando; Pagbilao; Pandi; Paombong; Parañaque; Pasay; Pasig; Pateros; Pila; Pililla; Plaridel; Pulilan; Quezon City; Rizal; Rodriguez; Rosario; Sampaloc; San Antonio; San Ildefonso; San Jose del Monte; San Juan; San Mateo; San Miguel; San Pablo; San Pascual; San Pedro; San Rafael; Santa Cruz; Santa Maria; Santa Rosa; Santo Tomas; Sariaya; Silang; San Simon (Note: Concepcion); Tagaytay; Taguig; Tanauan; Tanay; Tanza; Tayabas; Taytay; Teresa; Ternate; Tiaong; Trece Martires; Valenzuela; Victoria
Marinduque Electric Cooperative	MARELCO	SPUG-EC	Luzon	52,736	List (6): Boac; Buenavista; Gasan; Mogpog; Santa Cruz; Torrijos
Maripipi Multi-Purpose Electric Cooperative	MMPC	MPC	Visayas	1,502	List (1): Maripipi
Masbate Electric Cooperative	MASELCO	SPUG-EC	Luzon	62,296	List (17): Aroroy; Baleno; Balud; Cataingan; Cawayan; Claveria; Dimasalang; Esperanza; Mandaon; Masbate City; Milagros; Mobo; Palanas; Pio V. Corpus; Placer; San Pascual; Uson
Misamis Occidental I Electric Cooperative	MOELCI I	NEA-EC	Mindanao	52,161	List (8): Aloran; Baliangao; Calamba; Concepcion; Lopez Jaena; Oroquieta; Plaridel; Sapang Dalaga
Misamis Occidental II Electric Cooperative	MOELCI II	NEA-EC	Mindanao	71,719	List (8): Bonifacio; Clarin; Jimenez; Ozamiz; Panaon; Sinacaban; Tangub; Tudela
Misamis Oriental I Rural Electric Cooperative	MORESCO I	NEA-EC	Mindanao	88,474	List (14): Alubijid; Baungon; Cagayan de Oro; El Salvador; Gitagum; Iligan; Initao; Laguindingan; Libertad; Lugait; Manticao; Naawan; Opol; Talakag
Misamis Oriental II Electric Cooperative	MORESCO II	NEA-EC	Mindanao	70,400	List (13): Balingasag; Balingoan; Binuangan; Claveria; Gingoog; Jasaan; Kinoguitan; Lagonglong; Magsaysay; Medina; Salay; Sugbongcogon; Talisayan
MORE Electric and Power Corporation	MEPC	PIOU	Visayas	96,705	List (1): Iloilo City
Mountain Province Electric Cooperative	MOPRECO	NEA-EC	Luzon	40,140	List (13): Bauko; Barlig; Besao; Bontoc; Cervantes; Natonin; Paracelis; Quirino; Sabangan; Sadanga; Sagada; Tadian; Tinglayan
Negros Electric and Power Corporation	NEPC	TBA	Visayas	190,458	List (6): Bacolod; Bago; Don Salvador Benedicto; Murcia; Silay; Talisay
Negros Occidental Electric Cooperative	NOCECO	EC-CDA	Visayas	164,378	List (17): Binalbagan; Candoni; Cauayan; Himamaylan; Hinigaran; Hinoba-an; Ilog; Isabela; Kabankalan; La Carlota; La Castellana; Moises Padilla; Pontevedra; Pulupandan; San Enrique; Sipalay; Valladolid
Negros Oriental I Electric Cooperative	NORECO I	NEA-EC	Visayas	75,949	List (10): Ayungon; Bais; Bindoy; Canlaon; Guihulngan; La Libertad; Mabinay; Manjuyod; Tayasan; Vallehermoso
Negros Oriental II Electric Cooperative	NORECO II	EC-CDA	Visayas	141,427	List (14): Amlan; Bacong; Basay; Bayawan; Dauin; Dumaguete; Pamplona; San Jose; Santa Catalina; Siaton; Sibulan; Tanjay; Valencia; Zamboanguita
Northern Davao Electric Cooperative	NORDECO	NEA-EC	Mindanao	179,800	List (11): Compostela; Laak; Mabini; Maco; Maragusan; Mawab; Monkayo; Montevista; Nabunturan; New Bataan; Pantukan
Northern Negros Electric Cooperative	NONECO	NEA-EC	Visayas	146,126	List (9): Cadiz; Calatrava; Enrique B. Magalona; Escalante; Manapla; Sagay; San Carlos; Toboso; Victorias
Northern Samar Electric Cooperative	NORSAMELCO	NEA-EC	Visayas	80,873	List (24): Allen; Biri; Bobon; Capul; Catarman; Catubig; Gamay; Laoang (Note: Batag is off-the-grid); Lapinig; Las Navas; Lavezares; Lope de Vega; Mapanas; Mondragon; Palapag; Pambujan; Rosario; San Antonio; San Isidro; San Jose; San Roque; San Vicente; Silvino Lobos; Victoria
Nueva Ecija I Electric Cooperative	NEECO I	NEA-EC	Luzon	86,819	List (5): Cabiao; Gapan; Jaen; San Antonio; San Isidro
Nueva Ecija II Electric Cooperative (Area 1)	NEECO II – Area 1	NEA-EC	Luzon	125,021	List (10): Aliaga; Carranglan; Guimba; Licab; Lupao; Muñoz; Quezon; Santo Domingo; Talavera; Talugtug
Nueva Ecija II Electric Cooperative (Area 2)	NEECO II – Area 2	NEA-EC	Luzon	93,138	List (11): Bongabon; Gabaldon (Note: Bitulok and Sabani); General Mamerto Natividad; General Tinio (Note: Papaya); Laur; Llanera; Palayan; Peñaranda; Rizal; San Leonardo; Santa Rosa
Nueva Vizcaya Electric Cooperative	NUVELCO	EC-CDA	Luzon	99,181	List (14): Ambaguio; Aritao; Bagabag; Bambang; Bayombong; Diadi; Dupax del Norte; Dupax del Sur; Kasibu; Kayapa; Quezon; Santa Fe; Solano; Villaverde
Occidental Mindoro Electric Cooperative	OMECO	SPUG-EC	Luzon	76,162	List (9): Abra de Ilog; Calintaan; Magsaysay; Mamburao; Paluan; Rizal; Sablayan; San Jose; Santa Cruz
Olongapo Electricity Distribution Company	OEDC	PIOU	Luzon	51,867	List (1): Olongapo
Oriental Mindoro Electric Cooperative	ORMECO	SPUG-EC	Luzon	179,578	List (15): Baco; Bansud; Bongabong; Bulalacao; Calapan; Gloria; Mansalay; Naujan; Pinamalayan; Pola; Puerto Galera; Roxas; San Teodoro; Socorro; Victoria
Palawan Electric Cooperative	PALECO	SPUG-EC CDA	Luzon	111,464	List (19): Aborlan; Agutaya; Araceli; Balabac; Bataraza; Brooke's Point; Cagayancillo; Cuyo; Dumaran; El Nido; Magsaysay; Narra; Puerto Princesa; Quezon; Rizal; Roxas; San Vicente; Sofronio Española; Taytay
Pampanga I Electric Cooperative	PELCO I	NEA-EC	Luzon	100,185	List (6): Arayat; Candaba; Magalang; Mexico; San Luis; Santa Ana
Pampanga II Electric Cooperative	PELCO II	NEA-EC	Luzon	199,832	List (9): Bacolor; Floridablanca; Guagua; Lubao; Mabalacat; Magalang; Porac; Santa Rita; Sasmuan
Pampanga III Electric Cooperative	PELCO III	NEA-EC	Luzon	75,000	List (7): Apalit; Macabebe; Masantol; Minalin; San Simon; Santo Tomas; San Fernando (Note: Pandaras)
Pampanga Rural Electric Service Cooperative	PRESCO	NEA-EC	Luzon	21,118	List (4): Arayat; Magalang; Mexico; Santa Ana
Pangasinan I Electric Cooperative	PANELCO I	EC-CDA	Luzon	78,394	List (9): Agno; Alaminos; Anda; Bani; Bolinao; Burgos; Dasol; Infanta; Mabini
Pangasinan III Electric Cooperative	PANELCO III	EC-CDA	Luzon	188,102	List (17): Asingan; Balungao; Binalonan; Laoac; Mapandan; Natividad; Pozorrubio; Rosales; San Manuel; San Nicolas; San Quintin; Santa Maria; Santo Tomas; Tayug; Umingan; Urdaneta; Villasis
Pantabangan Municipal Electric System	PAMES	LGUOU	Luzon	—	List (1): Pantabangan
Peninsula Electric Cooperative	PENELCO	NEA-EC	Luzon	188,853	List (14): Abucay; Bagac; Balanga; Dinalupihan; Floridablanca; Hermosa; Limay; Mariveles; Morong; Orani; Orion; Pilar; Samal; Subic (Note: Batiawan)
Province of Siquijor Electric Cooperative	PROSIELCO	SPUG-EC	Visayas	27,635	List (6): Enrique Villanueva; Larena; Lazi; Maria; San Juan; Siquijor
Quezon I Electric Cooperative	QUEZELCO I	NEA-EC	Luzon	144,462	List (24): Agdangan; Alabat; Atimonan; Buenavista; Calauag; Catanauan; Del Gallego; General Luna; Guinayangan; Gumaca; Lopez; Macalelon; Mulanay; Padre Burgos; Perez; Pitogo; Plaridel; Quezon; San Andres; San Francisco; San Narciso; Santa Elena; Tagkawayan; Unisan
Quezon II Electric Cooperative	QUEZELCO II	NEA-EC	Luzon	30,648	List (8): Burdeos; General Nakar; Infanta; Jomalig; Panukulan; Patnanungan; Polillo; Real
Quirino Electric Cooperative	QUIRELCO	EC-CDA	Luzon	41,796	List (7): Aglipay; Cabarroguis; Diffun; Maddela; Nagtipunan; Saguday; San Agustin
Romblon Electric Cooperative	ROMELCO	SPUG-EC	Luzon	21,449	List (4): Cajidiocan; Magdiwang; Romblon; San Fernando
Samar I Electric Cooperative	SAMELCO I	NEA-EC	Visayas	64,850	List (10): Almagro; Calbayog; Gandara; Matuguinao; Pagsanghan; San Jorge; Santa Margarita; Santo Niño; Tagapul-an; Tarangnan
Samar II Electric Cooperative	SAMELCO II	NEA-EC	Visayas	76,816	List (16): Basey; Calbiga; Catbalogan; Daram; Hinabangan; Jiabong; Marabut; Motiong; Paranas; Pinabacdao; San Jose de Buan; San Sebastian; Santa Rita; Talalora; Villareal; Zumarraga
San Fernando Electric and Power Company	SFELAPCO	PIOU	Luzon	—	List (3): Bacolor (Note: Cabalantian and San Isidro); Floridablanca; San Fernando
San Jose City Electric Cooperative	SAJELCO	NEA-EC	Luzon	30,960	List (4): Carranglan; Llanera; Muñoz; San Jose
Siargao Electric Cooperative	SIARELCO	NEA-EC	Mindanao	34,362	List (9): Burgos; Dapa; Del Carmen; General Luna; Pilar; San Benito; San Isidro; Santa Monica; Socorro
Siasi Electric Cooperative	SIASELCO	SPUG-EC	Mindanao	—	List (1): Siasi
Sorsogon I Electric Cooperative	SORECO I	NEA-EC	Luzon	66,526	List (8): Bulan; Bulusan; Casiguran; Irosin; Juban; Magallanes; Matnog; Santa Magdalena
Sorsogon II Electric Cooperative	SORECO II	EC-CDA	Luzon	93,149	List (7): Barcelona; Castilla; Donsol; Gubat; Pilar; Prieto Diaz; Sorsogon City
South Cotabato I Electric Cooperative	SOCOTECO I	NEA-EC	Mindanao	118,770	List (10): Banga; Koronadal; Lake Sebu; Lutayan; Norala; Santo Niño; Surallah; T'Boli; Tampakan; Tantangan
South Cotabato II Electric Cooperative	SOCOTECO II	NEA-EC	Mindanao	185,622	List (10): Alabel; General Santos; Glan; Kiamba; Maasim; Maitum; Malapatan; Malungon; Polomolok; Tupi
Southern Leyte Electric Cooperative	SOLECO	NEA-EC	Visayas	91,802	List (19): Anahawan; Bontoc; Hinunangan (Note: San Pedro and San Pablo are off-the-grid); Hinundayan; Libagon; Liloan; Limasawa; Maasin; Macrohon; Malitbog; Padre Burgos; Pintuyan; Saint Bernard; San Francisco; San Juan; San Ricardo; Silago; Sogod; Tomas Oppus
Subic Enerzone Corporation	SEZ	PIOU	Luzon	3,363	List (4): Hermosa (Note: Subic Bay Freeport Zone); Morong; Olongapo; Subic
Sultan Kudarat Electric Cooperative	SUKELCO	NEA-EC	Mindanao	114,099	List (17): Bagumbayan; Buluan; Columbio; Datu Paglas; Esperanza; General Salipada K. Pendatun; Isulan; Kalamansig; Lambayong; Lebak; Mangudadatu; Paglat; Palimbang; Pandag; President Quirino; Senator Ninoy Aquino; Tacurong
Sulu Electric Cooperative	SULECO	SPUG-EC	Mindanao	15,842	List (7): Indanan; Jolo; Luuk; Maimbung; Parang; Patikul; Talipao
Surigao del Norte Electric Cooperative	SURNECO	NEA-EC	Mindanao	78,294	List (12): Alegria; Bacuag; Claver; Gigaquit; Mainit; Malimono; Placer; San Francisco; Sison; Surigao City (Note: Hikdop and Nonoc are off-the-grid); Tagana-an; Tubod
Surigao del Sur I Electric Cooperative	SURSECO I	NEA-EC	Mindanao	51,734	List (5): Barobo; Bislig; Hinatuan; Lingig; Tagbina
Surigao del Sur II Electric Cooperative	SURSECO II	NEA-EC	Mindanao	68,225	List (14): Bayabas; Cagwait; Cantilan; Carmen; Carrascal; Cortes; Lanuza; Lianga; Madrid; Marihatag; San Agustin; San Miguel; Tago; Tandag
Tablas Island Electric Cooperative	TIELCO	SPUG-EC	Luzon	41,438	List (10): Alcantara; Calatrava; Ferrol; Looc; Odiongan; San Agustin; San Andres; San Jose; Santa Fe; Santa Maria
Tarlac Electric	TEI	PIOU	Luzon	79,542	List (1): Tarlac City
Tarlac I Electric Cooperative	TARELCO I	NEA-EC	Luzon	177,792	List (17): Anao; Camiling; Cuyapo; Gerona; Guimba; Mayantoc; Moncada; Nampicuan; Paniqui; Pura; Ramos; San Clemente; San Jose; San Manuel; Santa Ignacia; Tarlac City; Victoria
Tarlac II Electric Cooperative	TARELCO II	NEA-EC	Luzon	102,979	List (5): Bamban; Capas; Concepcion; La Paz; Zaragoza
Tawi-Tawi Electric Cooperative	TAWELCO	SPUG-EC	Mindanao	13,227	List (9): Bongao; Languyan; Panglima Sugala; Sapa-Sapa; Sibutu; Simunul; Sitangkai; South Ubian; Tandubas
Ticao Island Electric Cooperative	TISELCO	SPUG-EC	Luzon	13,685	List (4): Batuan; Monreal; San Fernando; San Jacinto
Visayan Electric Company	VECO	PIOU	Visayas	437,823	List (8): Cebu City; Consolacion; Liloan; Mandaue; Minglanilla; Naga; San Fernando; Talisay
Zambales I Electric Cooperative	ZAMECO I	NEA-EC	Luzon	64,761	List (6): Botolan; Candelaria; Iba; Masinloc; Palauig; Santa Cruz
Zambales II Electric Cooperative	ZAMECO II	NEA-EC	Luzon	79,336	List (7): Cabangan; Castillejos; San Antonio; San Felipe; San Marcelino; San Narciso; Subic
Zamboanga City Electric Cooperative	ZAMCELCO	NEA-EC	Mindanao	121,750	List (1): Zamboanga City (Note: Sacol Island is off-the-grid)
Zamboanga del Norte Electric Cooperative	ZANECO	NEA-EC	Mindanao	124,242	List (23): Dapitan; Dipolog; Godod; Gutalac; Jose Dalman; Kalawit; Katipunan; La Libertad; Labason; Leon B. Postigo; Liloy; Manukan; Mutia; Piñan; Polanco; Rizal; Roxas; Salug; Sergio Osmeña; Siayan; Sibutad; Sindangan; Tampilisan
Zamboanga del Sur I Electric Cooperative	ZAMSURECO I	NEA-EC	Mindanao	134,205	List (25): Aurora; Dimataling; Dinas; Don Victoriano; Dumalinao; Dumingag; Guipos; Josefina; Labangan; Lapuyan; Mahayag; Margosatubig; Midsalip; Molave; Pagadian; Pitogo; Ramon Magsaysay; San Miguel; San Pablo; Sominot; Tabina; Tambulig; Tigbao; Tukuran; Vincenzo A. Sagun
Zamboanga del Sur II Electric Cooperative	ZAMSURECO II	NEA-EC	Mindanao	111,020	List (23): Alicia; Baliguian; Bayog; Buug; Diplahan; Imelda; Ipil; Kabasalan; Kumalarang; Lakewood; Mabuhay; Malangas; Naga; Olutanga; Payao; Roseller Lim; Siay; Sibuco; Siocon; Sirawai; Talusan; Titay; Tungawan

== See also ==
- List of companies of the Philippines
- List of power plants in the Philippines
