= Legislative districts of Masbate =

Legislative district of the Philippines

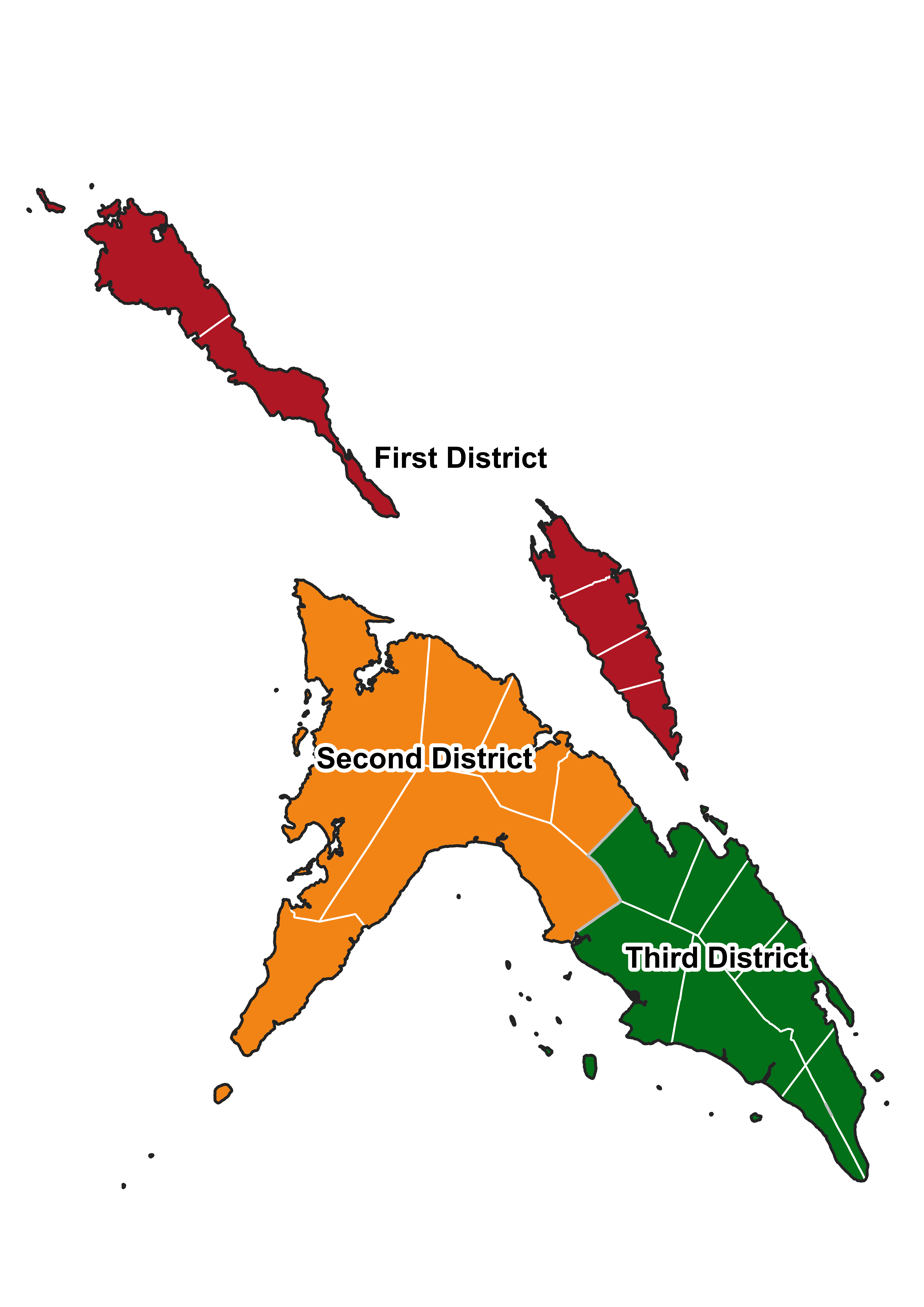
Legislative districts of Masbate.

The legislative districts of Masbate are the representations of the province of Masbate in the various national legislatures of the Philippines. The province is currently represented in the lower house of the Congress of the Philippines through its first, second, and third congressional districts.

== History ==
Masbate initially comprised a single district in 1898, when it elected two representatives to the Malolos Congress that lasted until 1899. The island of Burias, currently part of Masbate, also had a separate representation during such legislature.

Masbate later became part of the second district of Sorsogon from 1907 to 1922. Separating from Sorsogon to be reestablished as an independent province in 1920, the province regained its representation effective in 1922. It was part of the representation of Region V from 1978 to 1984, and from 1984 to 1986 it elected two assemblymen at-large. In 1987, it was redistricted into three legislative districts under the new Constitution which was proclaimed on February 11, 1987, and elected members to the restored House of Representatives starting that same year.

== Current Districts ==
Legislative districts and representatives of Masbate
District	Current Representative		Party	Constituent LGUs	Population (2020)	Area	Map
District	Image	Name	Party	Constituent LGUs	Population (2020)	Area	Map
1st		Antonio Kho (since 2025); San Jacinto	Lakas–CMD	List: Batuan; Claveria; Monreal; San Fernando; San Jacinto; San Pascual	177,651	814.48 km^{2}	
2nd		Elisa Kho (since 2025); Masbate City	Lakas–CMD	List: Aroroy; Baleno; Balud; Mandaon; Masbate City; Milagros; Mobo	404,366	2,053.25 km^{2}	
3rd		Wilton Kho (since 2019); Uson	Lakas–CMD	List: Cataingan; Cawayan; Dimasalang; Esperanza; Palanas; Pio V. Corpus; Placer; Uson	326,903	1,284.05 km^{2}	

== Lone District (defunct) ==
Period	Representative
6th Philippine Legislature; 1922–1925	Pablo de la Rosa
7th Philippine Legislature; 1925–1928	Eduardo Marcaida
8th Philippine Legislature; 1928–1931	Pio V. Corpus
9th Philippine Legislature; 1931–1934	Pio V. Corpus
10th Philippine Legislature; 1934–1935	Emilio B. Espinosa Sr.
1st National Assembly; 1935–1938	Pio V. Corpus
2nd National Assembly; 1938–1941	Pio V. Corpus
1st Commonwealth Congress; 1945	Emilio B. Espinosa Sr.
1st Congress; 1946–1949	Emilio B. Espinosa Sr.
2nd Congress; 1949–1953	Emilio B. Espinosa Sr.
3rd Congress; 1953–1957	Mateo S. Pecson
4th Congress; 1957–1961	Emilio Espinosa Jr.
5th Congress; 1961–1965	Emilio Espinosa Jr.
6th Congress; 1965–1969	Andres Clemente, Jr.
7th Congress; 1969–1972	Emilio Espinosa Jr.

== At-Large (defunct) ==
=== 1943–1944 ===
Period	Representative
National Assembly; 1943–1944	Pio V. Corpus
National Assembly; 1943–1944	Emilio B. Espinosa Sr.

=== 1984–1986 ===
Period	Representative
Regular Batasang Pambansa; 1984–1986	Jolly T. Fernandez
Regular Batasang Pambansa; 1984–1986	Venancio L. Yaneza

== See also ==
- Legislative districts of Sorsogon
