= Cawayan =

Municipality in Masbate, Philippines

- Municipality
- Municipality of Cawayan
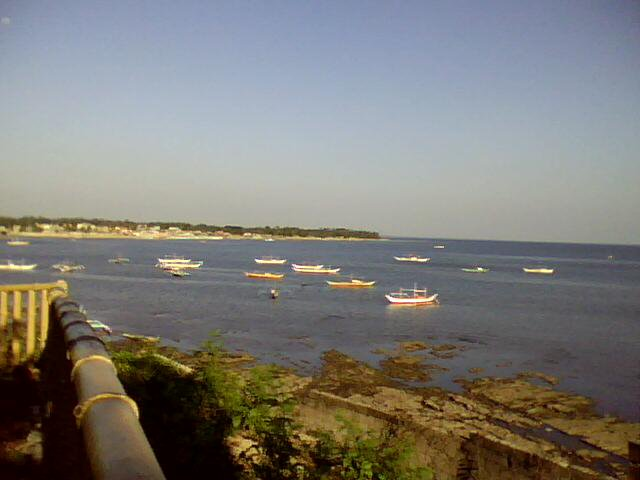
- Mahayahay Coastline

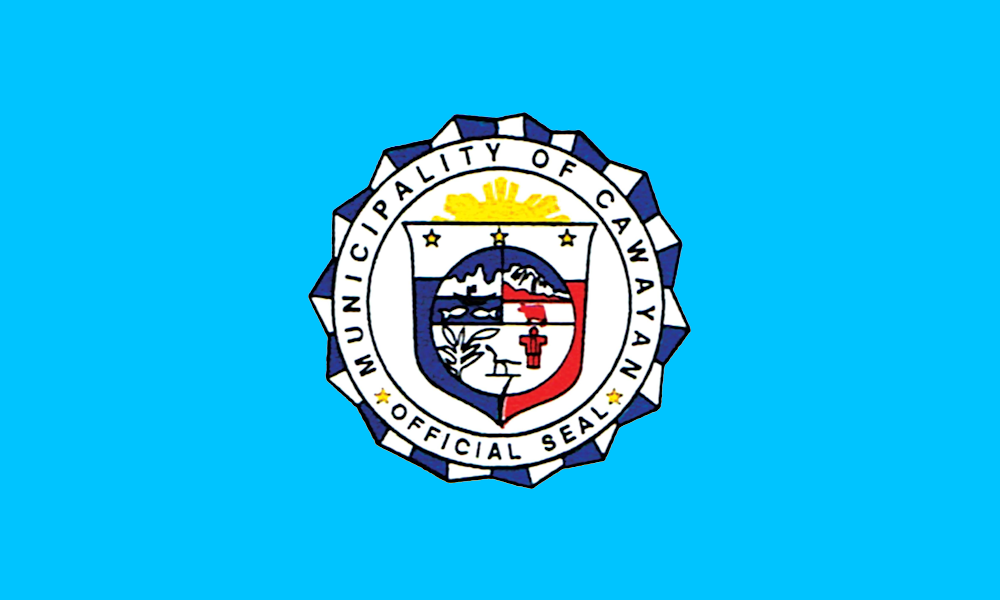
- Flag

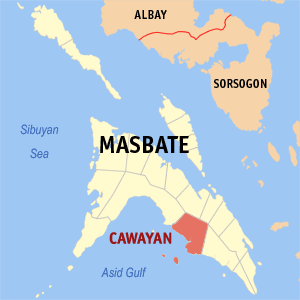
- Map of Masbate with Cawayan highlighted
- Interactive map of Cawayan
- Location within the Philippines
- Coordinates: 11°55′49″N 123°46′08″E
- Country: Philippines
- Region: Bicol Region
- Province: Masbate
- District: 3rd district
- Barangays: 37 (see Barangays)

Government
  - Type: Sangguniang Bayan
  - Mayor: Edgar S. Condor
  - Vice Mayor: Ester C. Binsol
  - Representative: Wilton T. Kho
  - Municipal Council: Members: Daniel O. Olmilla; Arnold A. Cortes; Victoria M. Ando; Vicenta S. Goopio; Renato B. Montecalvo; Jacinta V. Flores; Pol T. Yocte; Relan O. Abinuman
  - Electorate: 44,817 voters (2025)

Area
  - Total: 260.19 km^{2} (100.46 sq mi)
- Elevation: 12 m (39 ft)
- Highest elevation: 99 m (325 ft)
- Lowest elevation: 0 m (0 ft)

Population (2024 census)
  - Total: 68,510
  - Density: 263.3/km^{2} (682.0/sq mi)
  - Households: 16,169

Economy
  - Income class: 1st municipal income class
  - Poverty incidence: 22.48% (2023)
  - Revenue: ₱ 31.55 million (2024)
  - Assets: ₱ 1,160 million (2024)
  - Expenditure: ₱ 321.9 million (2024)
  - Liabilities: ₱ 679.7 million (2024)

Service provider
  - Electricity: Masbate Electric Cooperative (MASELCO)
- Time zone: UTC+8 (PST)
- ZIP code: 5405
- PSGC: 0504106000
- IDD : area code: +63 (0)56
- Native languages: Masbateño; Tagalog

Cawayan, officially the Municipality of Cawayan (Masbatenyo: Banwa san Cawayan; Cebuano: Lungsod sa Cawayan), is a municipality in the province of Masbate, Philippines. According to the 2024 census, it has a population of 68,510 people.

== History ==
Cawayan was created as a municipality from portions of Milagros through Executive Order No. 244 signed by President Elpidio Quirino on July 18, 1949.

== Geography ==
Cawayan is 64 kilometres (40 mi) from Masbate City. It shares road crossings with the municipalities of Uson, Dimasalang, Palanas, and Placer. From Cawayan Port, Milagros is 46 kilometres (29 mi) away and Bogo, Cebu is 110 kilometres (68 mi) away.

=== Barangays ===
Cawayan is politically subdivided into 37 barangays. Each barangay consists of puroks and some have sitios.

- Begia
- Cabayugan
- Cabungahan
- Calapayan
- Calumpang
- Dalipe
- Divisoria
- Guiom
- Gilotongan
- Itombato
- Libertad
- Looc
- Mactan
- Madbad
- R.M. Magbalon (Bebihan)
- Mahayahay
- Maihao
- Malbug
- Naro
- Pananawan
- Poblacion
- Pulot
- Recodo
- San Jose
- San Vicente
- Taberna
- Talisay
- Tuburan
- Villahermosa
- Chico Island
- Lague-lague
- Palobandera
- Pena Island
- Pin-As
- Iraya
- Punta Batsan
- Tubog

=== Climate ===
Climate data for Cawayan, Masbate
Month	Jan	Feb	Mar	Apr	May	Jun	Jul	Aug	Sep	Oct	Nov	Dec	Year
Mean daily maximum °C (°F)	29 (84)	29 (84)	31 (88)	32 (90)	32 (90)	31 (88)	30 (86)	30 (86)	30 (86)	30 (86)	29 (84)	29 (84)	30 (86)
Mean daily minimum °C (°F)	23 (73)	22 (72)	23 (73)	23 (73)	25 (77)	25 (77)	24 (75)	25 (77)	24 (75)	24 (75)	24 (75)	23 (73)	24 (75)
Average precipitation mm (inches)	39 (1.5)	34 (1.3)	42 (1.7)	36 (1.4)	73 (2.9)	109 (4.3)	118 (4.6)	108 (4.3)	129 (5.1)	136 (5.4)	112 (4.4)	89 (3.5)	1,025 (40.4)
Average rainy days	12.6	9.7	12.0	13.0	20.5	25.3	26.2	24.8	25.2	25.9	21.9	17.9	235
Source: Meteoblue

== Demographics ==
Population census of Cawayan

Year	Pop.	±% p.a.
1960	20,104	—
1970	28,708	+3.62%
1975	27,581	−0.80%
1980	31,696	+2.82%
1990	38,336	+1.92%
1995	45,834	+3.40%

Year	Pop.	±% p.a.
2000	52,256	+2.85%
2007	59,658	+1.84%
2010	63,115	+2.07%
2015	67,033	+1.15%
2020	69,265	+0.69%
2024	68,510	−0.26%

Source: Philippine Statistics Authority

In the 2024 census, the population of Cawayan was 68,510 people, with a density of 260 inhabitants per square kilometre or 670 inhabitants per square mile.

== Economy ==
Poverty incidence of Cawayan (%)

Source: Philippine Statistics Authority

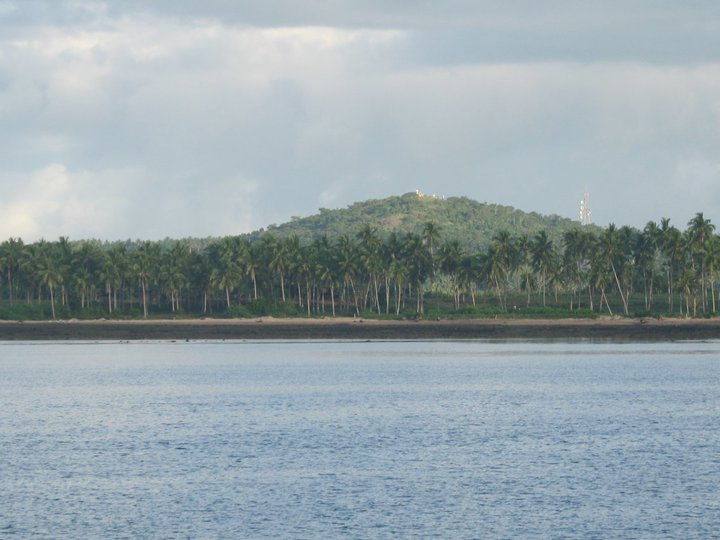
View of Mount Begia from Mahayahay

=== Agriculture ===
The locals of Cawayan still largely depend on subsistence farming despite its topographic advantage to adapt commercial farming. The lack of funding for agriculture and infrastructure and its political insecurity due to the presence and activities of armed groups kept by political families and other subversive elements hinder the town's progress in spite of its geographical benefits.

Being primarily plain and flat, Cawayan is conducive to cattle farming. Grasslands are abundant in the plains and in the gentle slopes of the valleys and hills. However, land grabbing issues still prevail as evidenced by hectares of private enclosures locally known as "ranchos" that run miles after miles. Herds of cattle inside the fence barrier are visible from the national road as one travels into the interior making Cawayan a major player in the cattle industry of the province.

Cawayan has several outlying islands crucial to its local fishing industries. These islands provide most of the marine resources to cater to the needs in the mainland. Barter trade is still practiced on Sundays, the town's busiest day.

Copra farming is also popular in Cawayan.

=== Infrastructure ===
Cawayan Port Improvement Project

The P42.95-million Cawayan Port Improvement Project in Barangay Mahayahay included the construction of rock causeway, back-up area, RC platform, RoRo ramp and breasting dolphin, as well as port lighting system, and mooring and fendering system. The project was completed on January 26, 2009.

RoRo Project

Other than the local outrigger boat operators, a shipping company provides services to cater to the town's need of reliable vessel to transfer commodities to and from Cawayan for trade. It departs daily from Cawayan usually at 12:00 noon for a six-hour trip and docks at Pulambato Port in Bogo, Cebu. And at around 12:00 midnight it sails back to Cawayan Port.

For about two years, the RoRo vessel stopped operating in Cawayan, but on October 10, 2012, RoRo service was restarted.

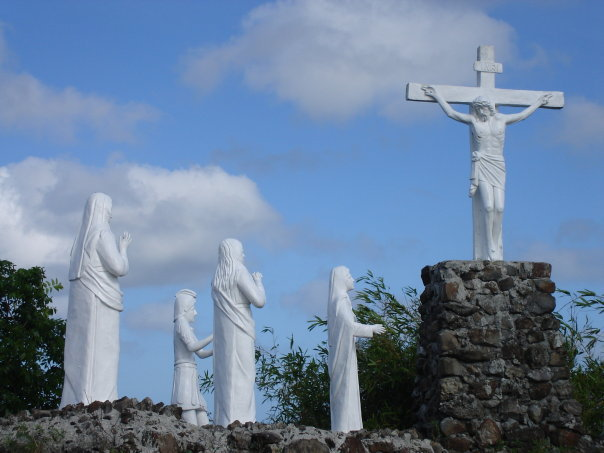
Station of the Cross

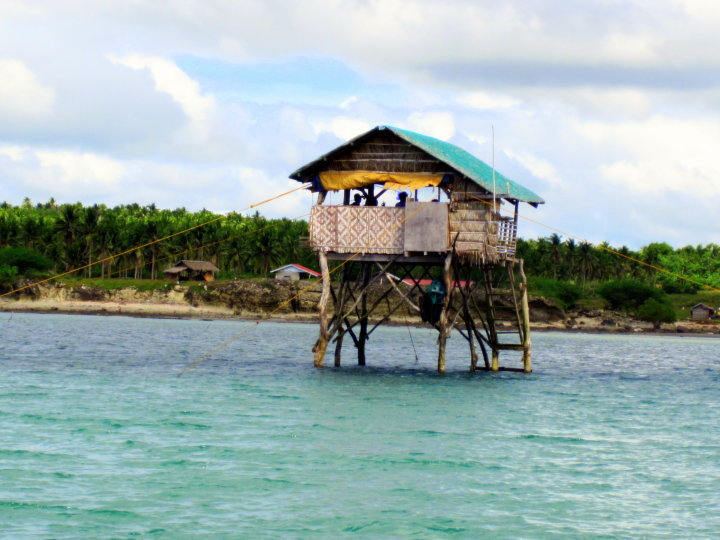
Marine Sanctuary in Recodo

=== Industry ===
A local crab meat processing industry operates in Peña Island owned by Arturo Marcaida Jr. He is considered as the most successful fisherman who made it big in fish culture and fish processing business not only in Masbate but in the entire Bicol Region which earned for him the title “Crab King".

Another booming industry of the town is the dried fish industry.

=== Tourism ===
Famous attractions include the Station of the Cross atop Mount Begia; tropical islets of Naro and Peña; a marine sanctuary across Recodo Bay; and a wide stretch of beaches among others.

Barangay Divisoria has one of the largest open markets in the Philippines.

== Education ==
There are two schools district offices which govern all educational institutions within the municipality. They oversee the management and operations of all private and public, from primary to secondary schools. These are the:

- Cataingan East Schools District (All schools in Cataingan)
- Cataingan West Schools District (All schools located in Cawayan)

=== Primary and elementary schools ===
- Agoho Elementary School
- Cabayugan Elementary School
- Cabungahan Elementary School
- Calapayan Elementary School
- Calumpang Elementary School
- Dalipe Elementary School
- Eden's Christian Academy
- Cawayan East Central School
- F. Jumao-as Elementary School
- Iraya Elementary School
- Lague-Lague Elementary School
- Libertad Elementary School
- Mactan Elementary School
- Malbug Elementary School
- Palobandera Elementary School
- Pananawan Elementary School
- Pulot Elementary School
- R.M. Magbalon Elementary School
- San Jose Elementary School
- St. Isidore Diocesan School
- Taberna Elementary School
- Tubog Elementary School
- Tuburan Elementary School
- Victor M. Diano Elementary School
- Villaganas Village Elementary School
- Villahermosa Elementary School

=== Secondary schools ===
- Rivera-Brizo National High School
- Casinillo-Monteroyo High School
- Dalipe High School
- Libertad High School
- Malbug High School
- Madbad National High School
- Naro National High School
- Sulpicio T. Condor Sr. National High School
- Tomas V. Rivera National High School
- Villahermosa National High School
- Western Masbate Roosevelt High School

=== Higher educational institution ===
- Atty. Manuel B. Abinuman Memorial Colleges
- DEBESMSCAT CAWAYAN CAMPUS
- Cawayan Community College
