= Masbate's 3rd congressional district =

Legislative district of the Philippines

- Constituency for the House of Representatives of the Philippines
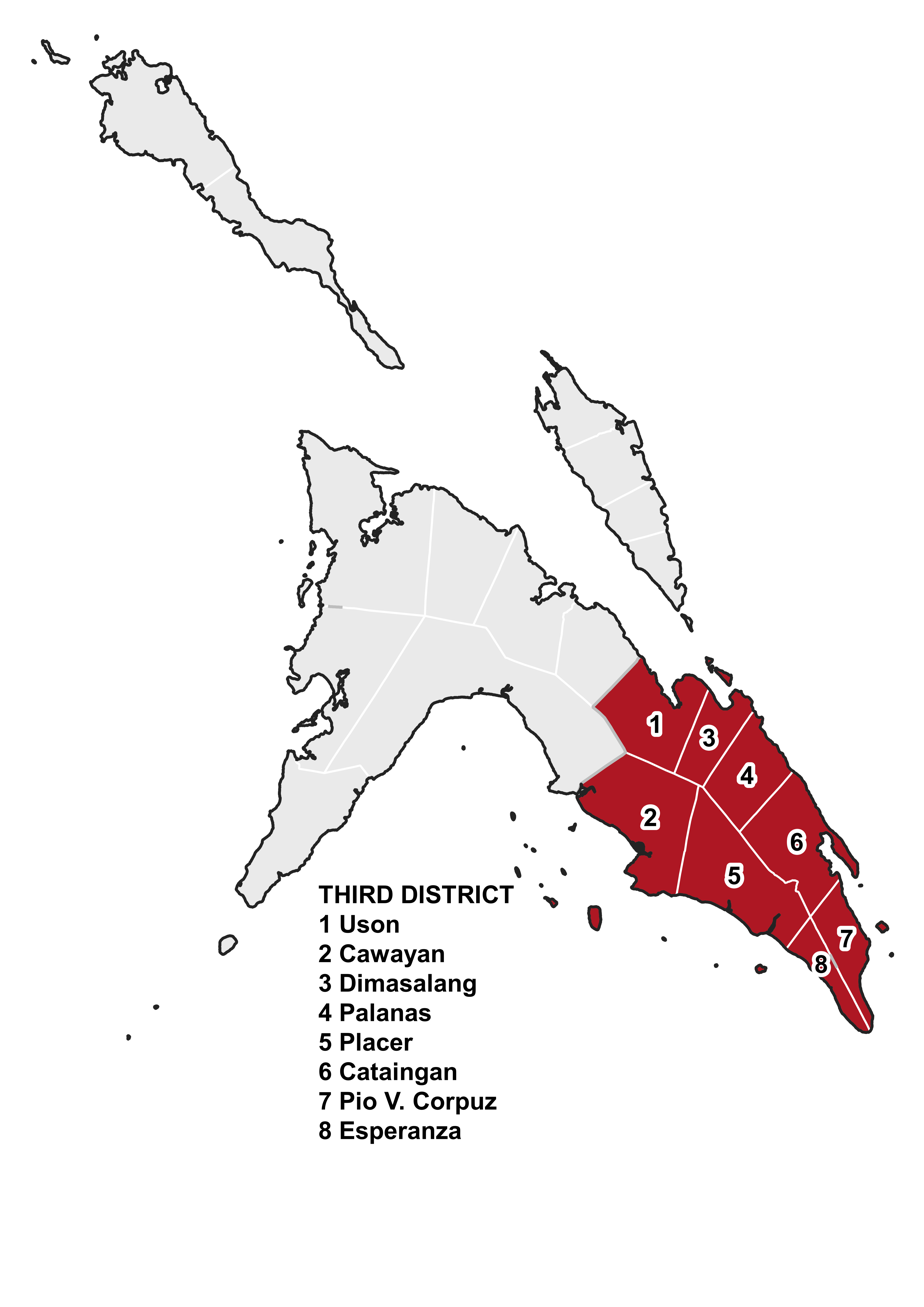

- Location of Masbate within the Philippines
- Province: Masbate
- Region: Bicol Region
- Population: 326,903 (2020)
- Electorate: 216,086 (2022)
- Major settlements: 8 LGUs: Municipalities; Cataingan; Cawayan; Dimasalang; Esperanza; Palanas; Pio V. Corpuz; Placer; Uson
- Area: 1,284.05 km^{2} (495.77 sq mi)

Current constituency
- Created: 1987
- Representative: Wilton T. Kho
- Political party: Lakas–CMD
- Congressional bloc: Majority

Masbate's 3rd congressional district is one of the three congressional districts of the Philippines in the province of Masbate. It has been represented in the House of Representatives since 1987. The district encompasses the eastern half of Masbate Island consisting of the municipalities of Cataingan, Cawayan, Dimasalang, Esperanza, Palanas, Pio V. Corpuz, Placer and Uson. It is currently represented in the 20th Congress by Wilton T. Kho of the Lakas–CMD.

== Representation history ==
#	Image	Member	Term of office		Congress	Party	Electoral history	Constituent LGUs
#	Image	Member	Start	End	Congress	Party	Electoral history	Constituent LGUs
=== Masbate's 3rd district for the House of Representatives of the Philippines ===
District created February 2, 1987.
1		Moises R. Espinosa	June 30, 1987	March 17, 1989	8th	Independent	Elected in 1987. Died in office.	1987–present Cataingan, Cawayan, Dimasalang, Esperanza, Palanas, Pio V. Corpuz, Placer, Uson
2		Antonio T. Kho	June 30, 1992	June 30, 1995	9th	Lakas	Elected in 1992.	1987–present Cataingan, Cawayan, Dimasalang, Esperanza, Palanas, Pio V. Corpuz, Placer, Uson
3		Fausto L. Seachon Jr.	June 30, 1995	June 30, 2004	10th	Lakas	Elected in 1995.	1987–present Cataingan, Cawayan, Dimasalang, Esperanza, Palanas, Pio V. Corpuz, Placer, Uson
3		Fausto L. Seachon Jr.	June 30, 1995	June 30, 2004	11th	LAMMP	Re-elected in 1998.	1987–present Cataingan, Cawayan, Dimasalang, Esperanza, Palanas, Pio V. Corpuz, Placer, Uson
3		Fausto L. Seachon Jr.	June 30, 1995	June 30, 2004	12th	NPC	Re-elected in 2001.	1987–present Cataingan, Cawayan, Dimasalang, Esperanza, Palanas, Pio V. Corpuz, Placer, Uson
4		Rizalina Seachon Lanete	June 30, 2004	June 30, 2010	13th	NPC	Elected in 2004.	1987–present Cataingan, Cawayan, Dimasalang, Esperanza, Palanas, Pio V. Corpuz, Placer, Uson
4		Rizalina Seachon Lanete	June 30, 2004	June 30, 2010	14th	NPC	Re-elected in 2007.	1987–present Cataingan, Cawayan, Dimasalang, Esperanza, Palanas, Pio V. Corpuz, Placer, Uson
5		Scott Davies S. Lanete	June 30, 2010	June 30, 2019	15th	NPC	Elected in 2010.	1987–present Cataingan, Cawayan, Dimasalang, Esperanza, Palanas, Pio V. Corpuz, Placer, Uson
5		Scott Davies S. Lanete	June 30, 2010	June 30, 2019	16th	NPC	Re-elected in 2013.	1987–present Cataingan, Cawayan, Dimasalang, Esperanza, Palanas, Pio V. Corpuz, Placer, Uson
5		Scott Davies S. Lanete	June 30, 2010	June 30, 2019	17th	NPC	Re-elected in 2016.	1987–present Cataingan, Cawayan, Dimasalang, Esperanza, Palanas, Pio V. Corpuz, Placer, Uson
6		Wilton T. Kho	June 30, 2019	Incumbent	18th	PDP–Laban	Elected in 2019.	1987–present Cataingan, Cawayan, Dimasalang, Esperanza, Palanas, Pio V. Corpuz, Placer, Uson
6		Wilton T. Kho	June 30, 2019	Incumbent	19th	Lakas	Re-elected in 2022.	1987–present Cataingan, Cawayan, Dimasalang, Esperanza, Palanas, Pio V. Corpuz, Placer, Uson
6		Wilton T. Kho	June 30, 2019	Incumbent	20th	Lakas	Re-elected in 2025.	1987–present Cataingan, Cawayan, Dimasalang, Esperanza, Palanas, Pio V. Corpuz, Placer, Uson

== Election results ==
=== 2025 ===
Candidate	Party	Votes	%
Tonton Kho (incumbent)	Lakas–CMD	127,161	89.18
Ricar Vasquez	Liberal Party	15,436	10.82
Total		142,597	100.00
Valid votes		142,597	85.08
Invalid/blank votes		25,008	14.92
Total votes		167,605	100.00
Registered voters/turnout		216,678	77.35
Lakas–CMD hold			
Source: Commission on Elections

=== 2022 ===
Candidate	Party	Votes	%
Wilton Kho (incumbent)	PDP–Laban	94,373	63.55
Dayan Lanete	Nationalist People's Coalition	54,121	36.45
Total		148,494	100.00
Total votes		178,879	–
Registered voters/turnout		216,086	82.78
PDP–Laban hold			
Source: Commission on Elections

=== 2016 ===
2016 Philippine House of Representatives elections
Party	Candidate	Votes	%
NPC	Scott Davies Lanete	63,684	
Nacionalista	Wilton Kho	48,722	
Invalid or blank votes		32,902	
Total votes		145,308	
NPC hold			

=== 2013 ===
2013 Philippine House of Representatives elections
Party	Candidate	Votes	%
NPC	Scott Davies Lanete	48,011	40.28
Liberal	Mac John Seachon	42,092	35.32
Independent	Ricardo Yanson	1,963	1.65
Margin of victory		5,919	4.97%
Invalid or blank votes		27,120	22.75
Total votes		119,186	100.00
NPC hold			

=== 2010 ===
Candidate	Party	Votes	%
Scott Davies Lanete	Nationalist People's Coalition	64,769	53.42
Demphna Naga	Independent	53,879	44.44
Alex Almario	Liberal Party	2,598	2.14
Total		121,246	100.00
Valid votes		121,246	88.94
Invalid/blank votes		15,071	11.06
Total votes		136,317	100.00
Nationalist People's Coalition hold			
Source: Commission on Elections

== See also ==
- Legislative districts of Masbate
