= Gabaldon =

Gabaldon is a surname. Notable people with the surname include:

- Argimiro Gabaldon, poet and former Venezuelan revolutionary of FALN
- Arnoldo Gabaldon, Venezuelan sanitarist
- Arnoldo Gabaldon Berti, Venezuelan engineer, first Environment minister of Latin America
- Diana Gabaldon, author of works including the "Outlander" and "Lord John" series
- Guy Gabaldon, U.S. Marine, "Pied Piper of Saipan"
- Isauro Gabaldon, Resident Commissioner from the Philippine Islands
- Joaquín Gabaldón Márquez, Venezuelan writer and politician
- José Rafael Gabaldón, Venezuelan andean caudillo
- Paca Gabaldón, Spanish actress.
- Tony Gabaldon, former Arizona state senator

== See also ==
- Gabaldon, Nueva Ecija, municipality in the Philippines
- Gabaldon School Buildings, a collective term for heritage school buildings in the Philippines
- Guy Gabaldon, USMC, semi-fluent in Japanese, awarded Navy Cross for valor at Saipan, 1944. "The Pied Piper of Saipan", on his own initiative convinced app.1,500 Japanese troops to surrender during combat operations, also acquiring in the process valuable intelligence that shortened the campaign, thereby saving Marine and Japanese lives.

== Venezuela ==
- Arnoldo Gabaldón : one of seven parochs of Municipality of Trujillo (Trujillo State)
- Arnoldo Gabaldón : one of two parochs of Municipality of Campo Elías (Trujillo State).
