= Esperanza, Masbate =

Municipality in Masbate, Philippines

Esperanza Halabangbaybay
- Municipality
- Municipality of Esperanza
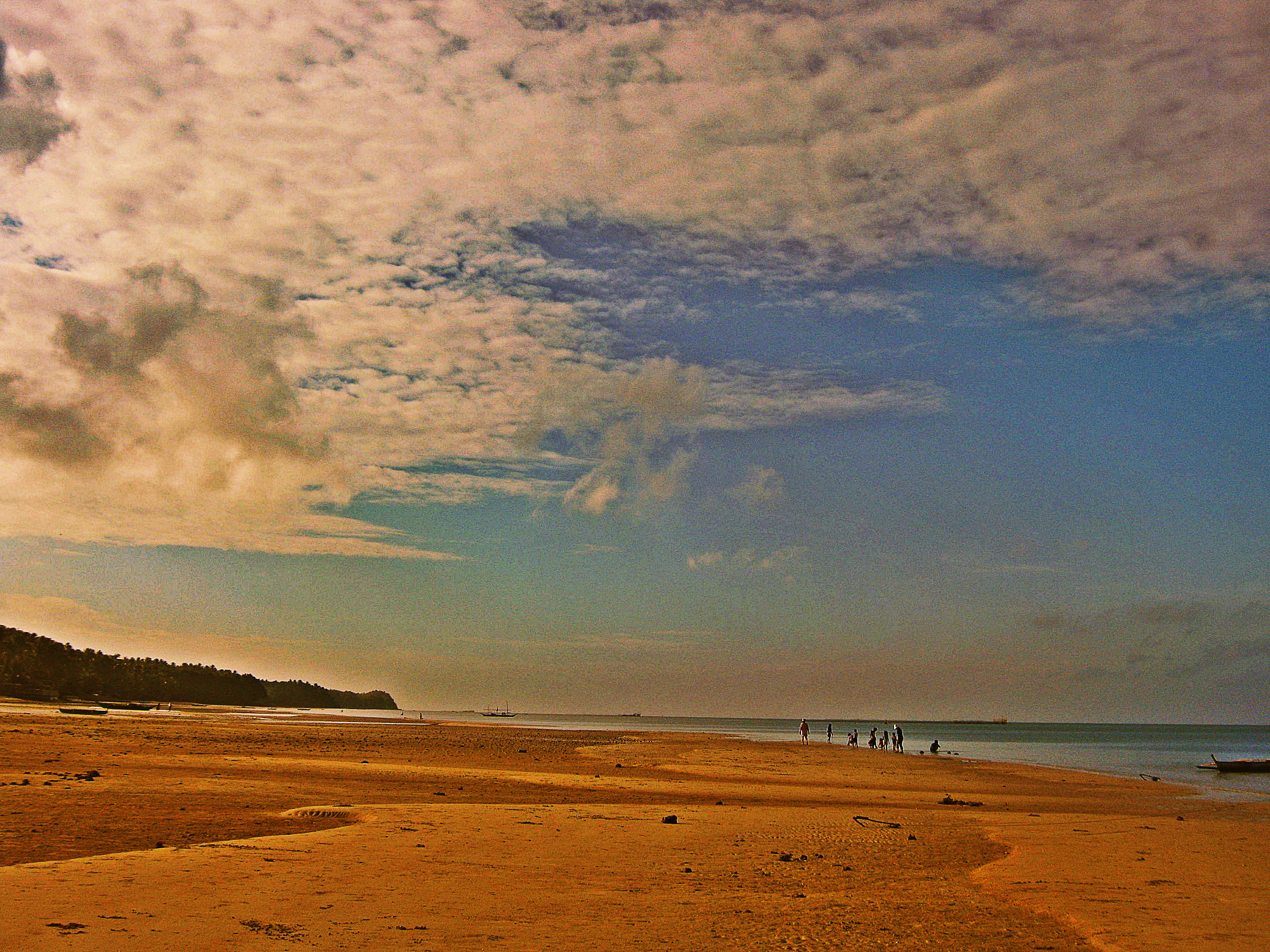
- Gawas Beach

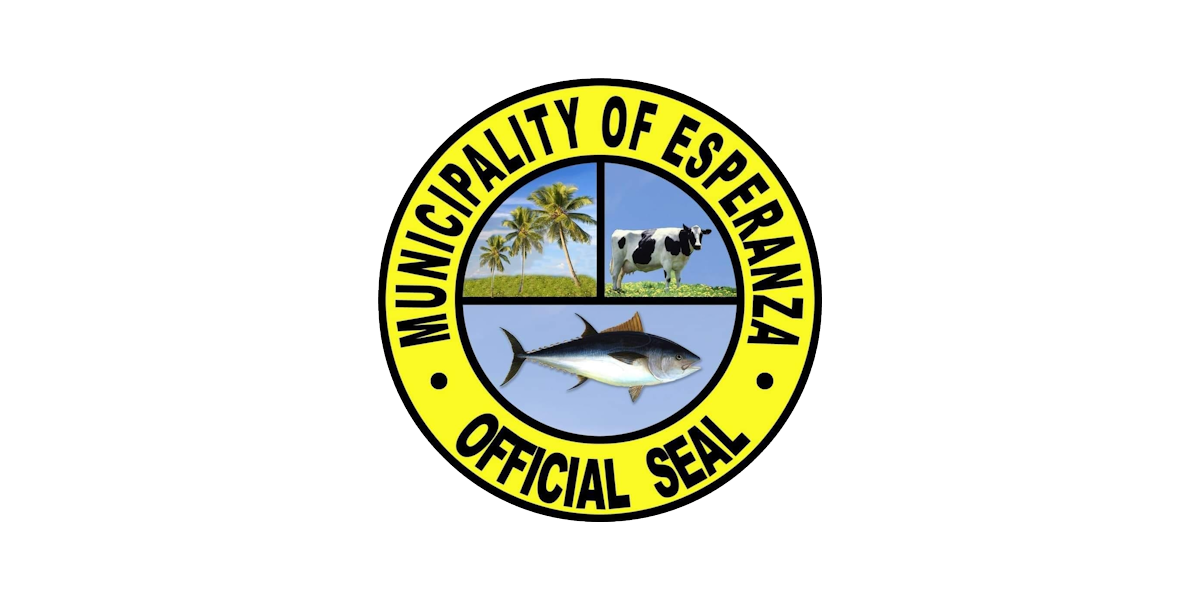
- Flag

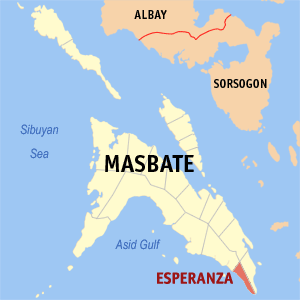
- Map of Masbate with Esperanza highlighted
- Interactive map of Esperanza
- Location within the Philippines
- Coordinates: 11°44′13″N 124°02′30″E
- Country: Philippines
- Region: Bicol Region
- Province: Masbate
- District: 3rd district
- Founded: May 7, 1959
- Barangays: 20 (see Barangays)

Government
  - Type: Sangguniang Bayan
  - Mayor: Fernando P. Talisic
  - Vice Mayor: Rodolfo P. Pepito
  - Representative: Wilton T. Kho
  - Municipal Council: Members: Cicero S. Conag; Michael C. Comedia Sr.; Melito M. Camon; Rodel D. Pepito; Felix A. Ponce Jr.; Raymond Ivan M. Diamos; Robert D. Guiz; Aldrin B. Jao
  - Electorate: 13,084 voters (2025)

Area
  - Total: 67.49 km^{2} (26.06 sq mi)
- Elevation: 10 m (33 ft)
- Highest elevation: 90 m (300 ft)
- Lowest elevation: 0 m (0 ft)

Population (2024 census)
  - Total: 18,021
  - Density: 267.0/km^{2} (691.6/sq mi)
  - Households: 4,306

Economy
  - Income class: 4th municipal income class
  - Poverty incidence: 21.2% (2023)
  - Revenue: ₱ 109.6 million (2024)
  - Assets: ₱ 432.1 million (2024)
  - Expenditure: ₱ 132.7 million (2024)
  - Liabilities: ₱ 171.9 million (2024)

Service provider
  - Electricity: Masbate Electric Cooperative (MASELCO)
- Time zone: UTC+8 (PST)
- ZIP code: 5407
- PSGC: 0504109000
- IDD : area code: +63 (0)56
- Native languages: Cebuano; Masbateño; Tagalog

Esperanza, officially the Municipality of Esperanza (Cebuano: Lungsod sa Esperanza), is a municipality in the province of Masbate, Philippines. According to the 2024 census, it has a population of 18,021 people.

The town is known for its several beaches, among them Gamay Na Baybay Beach, Talisay (Punta) Beach and Manok Manok Beach.

== History ==
In early 1915, a group of first settlers (Conag, Arabis, Pelayo and Serafin families) sailed from northern Cebu using their paddled banca and settled the place. The settlers actively cultivated the area into a productive agricultural community, developing the place until eventually called “Halabangbaybay”. Halabangbaybay means [Long Beach], due to its elongated shoreline and white fine sand. Halabangbaybay at that era was a green-mountainous forest community. It was not recognized as a barrio or even a mere sitio.

In the 1940s, Halabangbaybay became a sitio of the barrio Alegria in Cataingan. Soon after, it was converted into a barrio named Esperanza as a barangay of Placer in 1948 (the year the barrio Placer was separated from Cataingan and constituted as its own municipality) and Pablo M. Conag served as the “teniente del Barrio”. The name Esperanza means "Hope" in reference to the first group of migrants in 1915 who hoped for a better life by settling on the present-day area of Esperanza.

In the mid-1950s, Lawyer Alfonso E. Conag (one of the sons of Felimon Serafin Conag) initiated vigorously and pursued for the conversion of Esperanza into an independent municipality. Esperanza officially became an independent municipality on by virtue of Executive Order No. 337 of May 7, 1959.

On July 2, 1959, the set of municipal officials started to hold office and Santos Edem Conag, the eldest son of Felimo Serafin Conag, became the first elected mayor.

People in the 1970s to early 1990s were heavily dependent on the water resources in the so-called Kapayawan, which means "deep well". It is the only safe water source for the majority of the people living in the area. In 2000, Esperanza was finally connected to the electricity grid supplied by MASELCO which benefited 80% of the households in the area.

In 2006, President Gloria Arroyo defined Esperanza to be the most accessible town in Masbate going to Samar, Leyte and Cebu. That is the primary reason why the National Government constructed the port to serve as a roll-on/roll-off (RORO) gateway. The RORO vessels coming from Masbate docks at the RORO Port located at Barangay Polambato, Bogo, Cebu.

As of August 1, 2007, Esperanza has a total population of 16,834 according to National Statistic Office data.

== Geography ==
Esperanza is about 4 hours travel south of Masbate City, the last municipality in the south located between Placer in the north-west and Pio V Corpus in the southeast and is considered to be among the smallest in the island. Esperanza was initially one of the barangays of the town of Placer.

=== Barangays ===
Esperanza is politically subdivided into 20 barangays. Each barangay consists of puroks and some have sitios.

There are 11 barangays which located along the coastal line and nine in farm areas with an estimated of seventy 70% of the population belongs to the fisher folks.

- Agoho
- Almero
- Baras
- Domorog
- Guadalupe
- Iligan
- Labangtaytay
- Labrador
- Libertad
- Magsaysay
- Masbaranon
- Poblacion
- Potingbato
- Rizal
- San Roque
- Santiago
- Sorosimbajan
- Tawad
- Tunga
- Villa

=== Climate ===
Climate data for Esperanza, Masbate
Month	Jan	Feb	Mar	Apr	May	Jun	Jul	Aug	Sep	Oct	Nov	Dec	Year
Mean daily maximum °C (°F)	29 (84)	29 (84)	31 (88)	32 (90)	32 (90)	31 (88)	30 (86)	30 (86)	30 (86)	30 (86)	29 (84)	29 (84)	30 (86)
Mean daily minimum °C (°F)	23 (73)	22 (72)	23 (73)	23 (73)	25 (77)	25 (77)	24 (75)	25 (77)	24 (75)	24 (75)	24 (75)	23 (73)	24 (75)
Average precipitation mm (inches)	39 (1.5)	34 (1.3)	42 (1.7)	36 (1.4)	73 (2.9)	109 (4.3)	118 (4.6)	108 (4.3)	129 (5.1)	136 (5.4)	112 (4.4)	89 (3.5)	1,025 (40.4)
Average rainy days	12.6	9.7	12.0	13.0	20.5	25.3	26.2	24.8	25.2	25.9	21.9	17.9	235
Source: Meteoblue

Weather in Esperanza is generally divided into two seasonal weather patterns known locally as the Amihan and Habagat seasons. In the Tagalog language, Amihan means a cool north-east wind, and Habagat means west or south-west wind; south-west monsoon. Amihan and Habagat seasons are generally associated respectively with the El Niño and La Niña global weather patterns. The Amihan season is characterized by moderate temperatures, little or no rainfall, and a prevailing wind from the east. The Habagat season is characterized by hot and humid weather, frequent heavy rainfall, and a prevailing wind from the west.

On Esperanza, the main indicator of the switch between the Amihan and Habagat seasonal patterns is the switch in wind direction. In most years this transition is abrupt and occurs overnight. In some years there is a period of perhaps a week or two where the wind will switch between Amihan and Habagat patterns several times before settling into the pattern for the new season. As a rule of thumb, Labangtatay will be in the Habagat weather pattern from sometime in September or October to sometime in May or June and in the Amihan weather pattern for the remainder of the year. These dates can vary in individual years, though.

Daytime temperatures on Esperanza generally range from 77 to 90 °F (25 to 32 °C) from the beginning of the Amihan season into February or March, increase to the 82–100 °F (28–38 °C) range until the onset of the Habagat season, and moderate back to the 77–90 °F (25–32 °C) range with the return of the Amihan season.[8] During Tropical Storm periods, temperatures can fall below 68 °F (20 °C). Tropical Storms can impact Esperanza at any time of year, but are most likely to be seen during the Habagat season.

== Demographics ==
Population census of Esperanza

Year	Pop.	±% p.a.
1960	10,671	—
1970	11,513	+0.76%
1975	12,427	+1.54%
1980	14,191	+2.69%
1990	14,674	+0.34%
1995	17,023	+2.82%

Year	Pop.	±% p.a.
2000	16,209	−1.04%
2007	16,834	+0.52%
2010	17,357	+1.12%
2015	18,568	+1.29%
2020	17,534	−1.20%
2024	18,021	+0.66%

Source: Philippine Statistics Authority

In the 2024 census, the population of Esperanza was 18,021 people, with a density of 270 inhabitants per square kilometre or 700 inhabitants per square mile.

=== Language ===
Esperanza is a predominantly Cebuano-speaking municipality, with a majority of its inhabitants tracing their ancestries from northern Cebu, particularly from Bogo. Esperanza is one of the four municipalities which are predominantly Cebuano-speaking in Masbate.

== Economy ==
Poverty incidence of Esperanza (%)

Source: Philippine Statistics Authority

== Transportation ==
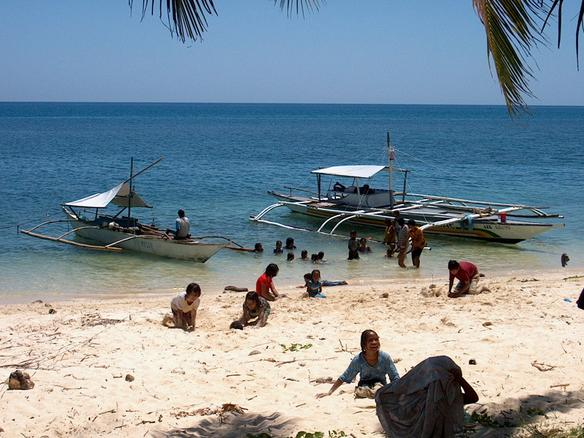
Esperanza beach

In Esperanza, the two main modes of transport are via motor-tricycles along the main road or by walking along the beaches. Pedicabs are also available for transport along the beachfront path. Other means of transportation include mountain bikes, quad bikes, and motorbikes, all of which can be rented.

To explore around the island's coast, motorized bancas and sailing paraws are available for rent. These are outrigger canoes and are a common sight in waters around the island. The sailing paraw is a narrow hulled boat with outriggers on either side and with passengers sometimes seated on a trampoline platform between the outrigger supports. These are extremely fast off the wind but can be unwieldy for inexperienced sailors.

About 60% of the population lives along the coastline, most of whom are fishermen.

== Education ==
The Esperanza Schools District Office governs all educational institutions within the municipality. It oversees the management and operations of all private and public, from primary to secondary schools.

=== Primary and elementary schools ===
- Baras Elementary School
- Florencio Y. Francisco Elementary School
- Guadalupe Elementary School
- Labrador Elementary School
- Libertad Primary School
- Magsaysay Elementary School
- Masbaranon Elementary School
- Pablo M. Conag Central School
- Prudencio Martinez Elementary School
- Putingbato Elementary School
- Rizal Primary School
- San Roque Elementary School
- Santiago Elementary School
- Sorosimbahan Elementary School
- Tawad Elementary School
- Trangia-Mahusay Elementary School
- Tunga Elementary School
- Villa Elementary School

=== Secondary schools ===
- Allanaraiz-Marfil High School
- Santos E. Conag National High School
- Villa Integrated School
