= Pio V. Corpus =

Municipality in Masbate, Philippines

Pio V. Corpus Limbuhan
- Municipality
- Municipality of Pio V. Corpus
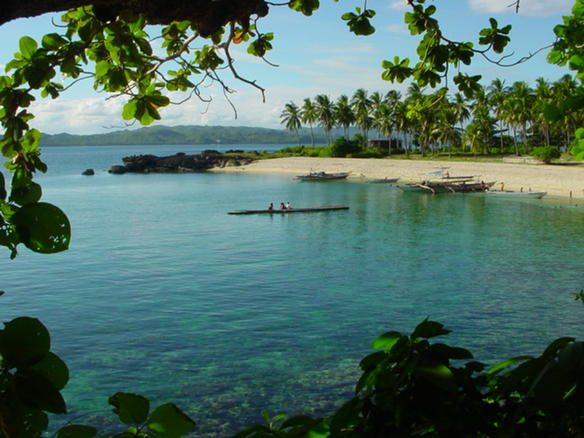
- Balangingi Island Beach

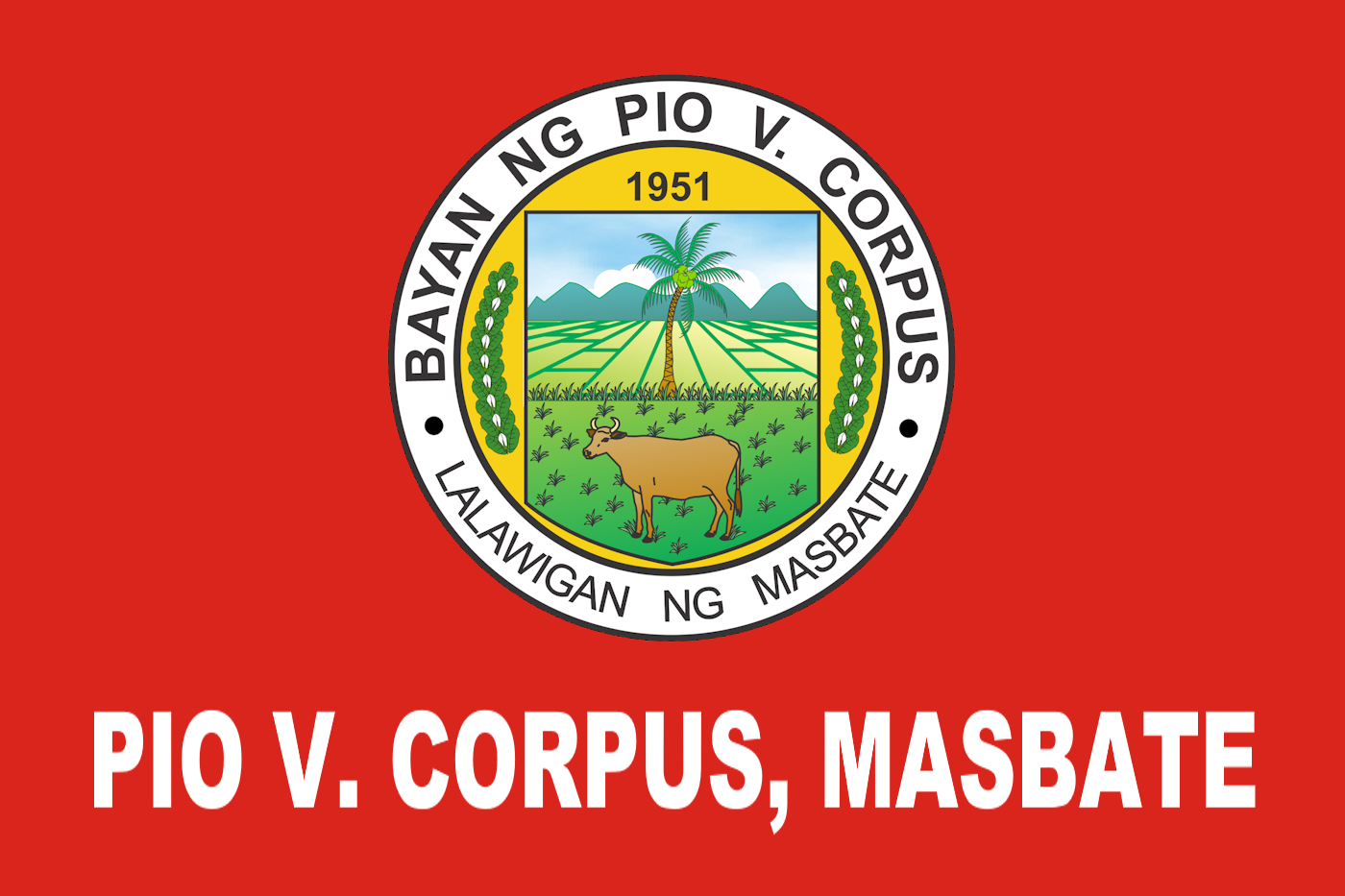
- Flag
- Motto: "Lambo Limbuhan!"
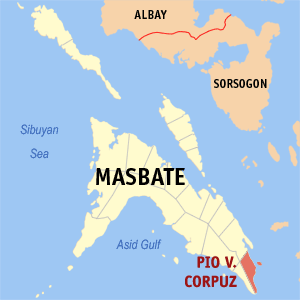
- Map of Masbate with Pio V. Corpus highlighted
- Interactive map of Pio V. Corpus
- Location within the Philippines
- Coordinates: 11°53′01″N 124°02′59″E
- Country: Philippines
- Region: Bicol Region
- Province: Masbate
- District: 3rd district
- Founded: June 11, 1951
- Barangays: 18 (see Barangays)

Government
  - Type: Sangguniang Bayan
  - Mayor: Mark R. Antonio
  - Vice Mayor: Rozabeth M. Tayo
  - Representative: Wilton T. Kho
  - Municipal Council: Members: Adolf B. Avila; Brandon S. Prudenciado; Krince Mykette M. Gil; Aian F. Lepasana; Janet C. Cababan; Leo A. Lecciones; Edly "Bimbo" M. Pasaylo; Hana Barcelona - Lecciones; Leonila F. Lepasana (Liga ng mga Barangay - Pio V. Corpus, Masbate Chapter President); Victorino M. Dollison V (Sangguniang Kabataan Federation - Pio V. Corpus, Masbate President)
  - Electorate: 16,657 voters (2025)

Area
  - Total: 89.33 km^{2} (34.49 sq mi)
- Elevation: 38 m (125 ft)
- Highest elevation: 240 m (790 ft)
- Lowest elevation: 0 m (0 ft)

Population (2024 census)
  - Total: 23,641
  - Density: 264.6/km^{2} (685.4/sq mi)
  - Households: 5,960

Economy
  - Income class: 4th municipal income class
  - Poverty incidence: 19.64% (2023)
  - Revenue: ₱ 134.9 million (2024)
  - Assets: ₱ 274.5 million (2024)
  - Expenditure: ₱ 151.8 million (2024)
  - Liabilities: ₱ 76.55 million (2024)

Service provider
  - Electricity: Masbate Electric Cooperative (MASELCO)
- Time zone: UTC+8 (PST)
- ZIP code: 5406
- PSGC: 0504116000
- IDD : area code: +63 (0)56
- Native languages: Cebuano; Masbateño; Tagalog

Pio V. Corpus, officially the Municipality of Pio V. Corpus (Masbateño: Munisipyo san Pio V. Corpus; Cebuano: Lungsod sa Pio V. Corpus; Tagalog: Bayan ng Pio V. Corpus) is a municipality in the province of Masbate, Philippines. According to the 2024 census, it has a population of 23,641 people.

== History ==
Pio V. Corpus was formerly known as Limbuhan. On June 11, 1951, the barrios of Limbuhan, Guindawahan, Palho, Casabangan, Salvacion, Alegria, Tanque, Bunducan, Bugtong, and Cabangrayan were separated from the town of Cataingan and created into the municipality of Limbuhan through Republic Act No. 641. The municipality received its current name on June 15, 1954 and was named after the former congressman and governor Pio Vicente Corpus (1883–1944). Born on July 11, 1883, in San Antonio, Zambales, he migrated to Masbate and he would later serve in the war time Japanese-sponsored government and was unfortunately assassinated by the Japanese Intelligence due to mistrust on February 7, 1944, in Manila. Its first mayor was Daniel Señoron.

== Government ==
=== Elected officials ===
Municipality of Pio V. Corpus, Masbate elected officials (2022–2025)
Municipal Mayor
Hon. Mark Repalda Antonio
Municipal Vice Mayor
Hon. Rozabeth Montecalvo Tayo
Sangguniang Bayan Members
Hon. Adolf Bucado Avila
Hon. Brandon Sevilla Prudenciado
Hon. Krince Mykette Marilla Gil
Hon. Aian Francisco Lepasana
Hon. Janeth Comedia Cababan
Hon. Leo Almario Lecciones
Hon. Edly "Bimbo" Mahinay Pasaylo
Hon. Hana Senen Barcelona - Lecciones
Hon. Leonila F. Lepasana (Punong Barangay, Salvacion/Liga ng mga Barangay - Pio V. Corpus, Masbate Chapter President)
Hon. Victorino M. Dollison V (SK Chairman, Poblacion/Sangguniang Kabataan Federation - Pio V. Corpus President)

== Geography ==
=== Barangays ===
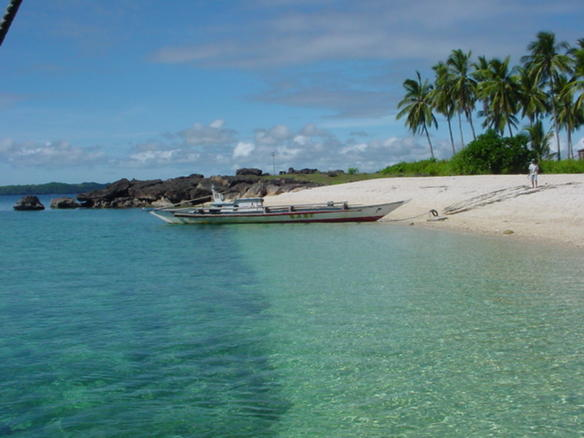
Balangingi Island

Pio V. Corpus is politically subdivided into 18 barangays. Each barangay consists of puroks and some have sitios.

Sitio Bugang was converted into a barrio in 1957.

- Alegria
- Buenasuerte
- Bugang
- Bugtong
- Bunducan
- Cabangrayan
- Calongongan
- Casabangan
- Guindawahan
- Labigan
- Lampuyang
- Mabuhay
- Palho
- Poblacion
- Salvacion
- Tanque
- Tubigan
- Tubog

=== Climate ===
Climate data for Pio V. Corpus, Masbate
Month	Jan	Feb	Mar	Apr	May	Jun	Jul	Aug	Sep	Oct	Nov	Dec	Year
Mean daily maximum °C (°F)	29 (84)	29 (84)	31 (88)	32 (90)	32 (90)	31 (88)	30 (86)	30 (86)	30 (86)	30 (86)	29 (84)	29 (84)	30 (86)
Mean daily minimum °C (°F)	23 (73)	22 (72)	23 (73)	23 (73)	25 (77)	25 (77)	24 (75)	25 (77)	24 (75)	24 (75)	24 (75)	23 (73)	24 (75)
Average precipitation mm (inches)	39 (1.5)	34 (1.3)	42 (1.7)	36 (1.4)	73 (2.9)	109 (4.3)	118 (4.6)	108 (4.3)	129 (5.1)	136 (5.4)	112 (4.4)	89 (3.5)	1,025 (40.4)
Average rainy days	12.6	9.7	12.0	13.0	20.5	25.3	26.2	24.8	25.2	25.9	21.9	17.9	235
Source: Meteoblue

== Demographics ==
Population census of Pio V. Corpus

Year	Pop.	±% p.a.
1960	16,317	—
1970	17,473	+0.69%
1975	20,030	+2.78%
1980	21,021	+0.97%
1990	18,847	−1.09%
1995	20,649	+1.73%

Year	Pop.	±% p.a.
2000	21,519	+0.89%
2007	22,102	+0.37%
2010	23,292	+1.93%
2015	23,236	−0.05%
2020	23,744	+0.46%
2024	23,641	−0.10%

Source: Philippine Statistics Authority

In the 2024 census, the population of Pio V. Corpus was 23,641 people, with a density of 260 inhabitants per square kilometre or 670 inhabitants per square mile.

== Economy ==
Poverty incidence of Pio V. Corpus (%)

Source: Philippine Statistics Authority

== Education ==
The Pio V. Corpus Schools District Office governs all educational institutions within the municipality. It oversees the management and operations of all private and public, from primary to secondary schools.

=== Primary and elementary schools ===
- Alegria Elementary School
- Andres Naval Elementary School
- Barbridge Academy
- Buenasuerte Integrated School
- Bugang Elementary School
- Bunducan Elementary School
- Cabangrayan Elementary School
- Calong-Ongan Elementary School
- Casabangan Elementary School
- Guindawahan Elementary School
- Labigan Primary School
- Lampuyang Elementary School
- Mabuhay Elementary School
- Palho Elementary School
- Pio V. Corpus Central School
- Salvacion Elementary School
- Simeon Dela Peña Elementary School
- Tanque Elementary School
- Tubigan Elementary School

=== Secondary schools ===
- Conrada Tero Kho Memorial High School
- Masbate Southeastern Institute
- Ovilla Technical College
- Tanque National High School

== See also ==
- List of renamed cities and municipalities in the Philippines
