= Cataingan =

Municipality in Masbate, Philippines

- Municipality
- Municipality of Cataingan
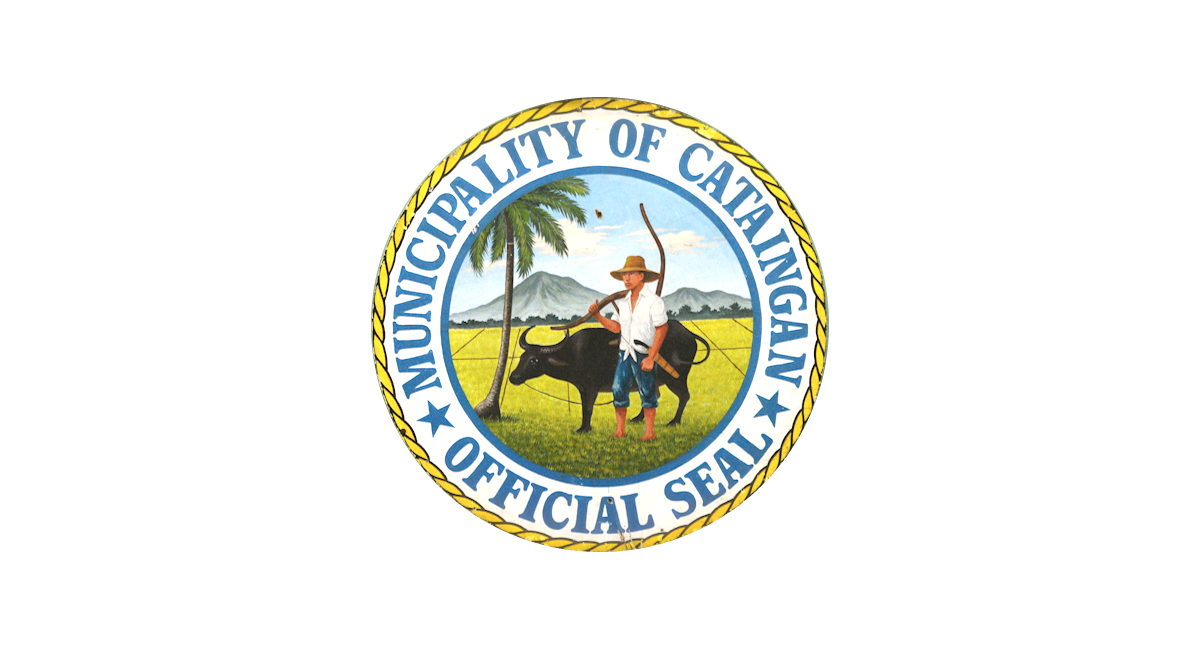
- Flag

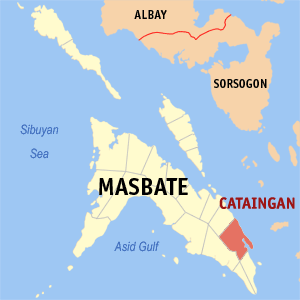
- Map of Masbate with Cataingan highlighted
- Interactive map of Cataingan
- Location within the Philippines
- Coordinates: 12°00′10″N 123°59′40″E
- Country: Philippines
- Region: Bicol Region
- Province: Masbate
- District: 3rd district
- Barangays: 36 (see Barangays)

Government
  - Type: Sangguniang Bayan
  - Mayor: Felipe L. Cabataña
  - Vice Mayor: Thelma K. Ang
  - Representative: Wilton T. Kho
  - Municipal Council: Members: George P. Gonzales Sr.; Hilary A. Gonzales; Philip Sonny K. Cabataña V; Gemma S. Amatos; Cerecio R. Mapula; Ramil C. Adoptante; Rocefico L. Ching; Wilson Leo K. Ang
  - Electorate: 30,715 voters (2025)

Area
  - Total: 191.64 km^{2} (73.99 sq mi)
- Elevation: 43 m (141 ft)
- Highest elevation: 274 m (899 ft)
- Lowest elevation: 0 m (0 ft)

Population (2024 census)
  - Total: 51,165
  - Density: 266.98/km^{2} (691.49/sq mi)
  - Households: 12,036

Economy
  - Income class: 1st municipal income class
  - Poverty incidence: 19.78% (2023)
  - Revenue: ₱ 261.5 million (2024)
  - Assets: ₱ 821.1 million (2024)
  - Expenditure: ₱ 225.1 million (2024)
  - Liabilities: ₱ 271.8 million (2024)

Service provider
  - Electricity: Masbate Electric Cooperative (MASELCO)
- Time zone: UTC+8 (PST)
- ZIP code: 5415
- PSGC: 0504105000
- IDD : area code: +63 (0)56
- Native languages: Masbateño; Tagalog
- Website: catainganmasbate.gov.ph

Cataingan, officially the Municipality of Cataingan, is a municipality in the province of Masbate, Philippines. According to the 2024 census, it has a population of 51,165 people.

== History ==
In 1948, Placer, then a barrio of this town, was separated as a town by virtue of Republic Act No. 292, passed June 16, 1948. Three years later, in 1951, the barrios of Limbuhan, Guindawahan, Palho, Casabangan, Salvacion, Alegria, Tanke, Bundukan, Bugtong, and Cabangrayan were separated from Cataingan and created into the town of Limbuhan. Placer, at that time of its creation, included the entire present day Municipality of Esperanza (which was then known as Barrio Esperanza).

== Geography ==
Cataingan is 76 kilometres (47 mi) southeast of Masbate City.

=== Barangays ===
Cataingan is politically subdivided into 36 barangays. Each barangay consists of puroks and some have sitios.

- Abaca
- Aguada
- Badiang
- Bagumbayan
- Cadulawan
- Cagbatang
- Chimenea
- Concepcion
- Curvada
- Divisoria
- Domorog
- Estampar
- Gahit
- Libtong
- Liong
- Maanahao
- Madamba
- Malobago
- Matayum
- Matubinao
- Mintac
- Nadawisan
- Osmeña
- Pawican
- Pitogo
- Poblacion
- Quezon
- San Isidro
- San Jose
- San Pedro
- San Rafael
- Santa Teresita
- Santo Niño
- Tagboan
- Tuybo
- Villa Pogado

=== Climate ===
Climate data for Cataingan, Masbate
| Month | Jan | Feb | Mar | Apr | May | Jun | Jul | Aug | Sep | Oct | Nov | Dec | Year |
|---|---|---|---|---|---|---|---|---|---|---|---|---|---|
| Mean daily maximum °C (°F) | 28 (82) | 29 (84) | 30 (86) | 32 (90) | 32 (90) | 31 (88) | 30 (86) | 30 (86) | 30 (86) | 29 (84) | 29 (84) | 28 (82) | 30 (86) |
| Mean daily minimum °C (°F) | 22 (72) | 22 (72) | 22 (72) | 23 (73) | 24 (75) | 25 (77) | 24 (75) | 24 (75) | 24 (75) | 24 (75) | 23 (73) | 23 (73) | 23 (74) |
| Average precipitation mm (inches) | 39 (1.5) | 34 (1.3) | 42 (1.7) | 36 (1.4) | 73 (2.9) | 109 (4.3) | 118 (4.6) | 108 (4.3) | 129 (5.1) | 136 (5.4) | 112 (4.4) | 89 (3.5) | 1,025 (40.4) |
| Average rainy days | 12.6 | 9.7 | 12.0 | 13.0 | 20.5 | 25.3 | 26.2 | 24.8 | 25.2 | 25.9 | 21.9 | 17.9 | 235 |
Source: Meteoblue

== Demographics ==
Population census of Cataingan

| Year | Pop. | ±% p.a. |
|---|---|---|
| 1903 | 4,579 | — |
| 1918 | 9,975 | +5.33% |
| 1939 | 38,709 | +6.67% |
| 1948 | 53,326 | +3.62% |
| 1960 | 26,371 | −5.70% |
| 1970 | 36,148 | +3.20% |
| 1975 | 37,644 | +0.82% |
| 1980 | 39,378 | +0.90% |

| Year | Pop. | ±% p.a. |
|---|---|---|
| 1990 | 39,496 | +0.03% |
| 1995 | 42,065 | +1.19% |
| 2000 | 46,593 | +2.22% |
| 2007 | 48,827 | +0.65% |
| 2010 | 49,078 | +0.19% |
| 2015 | 50,327 | +0.48% |
| 2020 | 50,623 | +0.12% |
| 2024 | 51,165 | +0.26% |

Source: Philippine Statistics Authority

In the 2024 census, the population of Cataingan was 51,165 people, with a density of 270 inhabitants per square kilometre or 700 inhabitants per square mile.

=== Language ===
Cataingan is one of the municipalities and cities of Masbate where Masbateño is the indigenous language. Waray is also spoken there.

== Economy ==
Poverty incidence of Cataingan (%)

Source: Philippine Statistics Authority

== Education ==
There are two schools district offices which govern all educational institutions within the municipality. They oversee the management and operations of all private and public, from primary to secondary schools. These are the:

- Cataingan East Schools District (All schools in Cataingan)
- Cataingan West Schools District (All schools located in Cawayan)

=== Primary and elementary schools ===
- Abaca Elementary School
- Aguada Elementary School
- Badiang Elementary School
- Bagumbayan Elementary School
- Bel-is Elementary School
- Busay Elementary School
- Cadulawan Elementary School
- Cagbatang Elementary School
- Chimenea Elementary School
- Curvada Elementary School
- Divisoria Elementary School
- Domorog Elementary School
- Emilio S. Boro Sr. Central School
- Estampar Elementary School
- Eulogio C. Adoptante Elementary School
- Gahit Elementary School
- Green Meadows Tiny Tots
- Libtong Elementary School
- Liceo de San Pedro Calungsod Mission School
- Liong Elementary School
- Loreto A. Yanson Elementary School
- Maanahao Elementary School
- Malobago Elementary School
- Martin T. Miscala Elementary School
- Matayum Elementary School
- Matubinao Elementary School
- Mintac Elementary School
- Nadawisan Elementary School
- Osmeña Elementary School
- Pawican Elementary School
- Pitogo Elementary School
- Potenciano A. Abejero Elementary School
- Quezon Elementary School
- San Isidro Elementary School
- San Jose Elementary School
- San Pedro e-IMPACTLearning Center
- St. Vincent Ferrer Diocesan School
- T.C.G Sto. Nino Elementary School
- Tagala Elementary School
- Tagboan Elementary School
- Theotokos Orthodox Kindergarten
- Villa Pogado Elementary School

=== Secondary schools ===
- Abella Polytechnic Institute
- Badiang National High School
- Cataingan National High School
- Feliciano S. Samonte Memorial High School
- Liong National High School
- Madamba Integrated School
- Marcelo A. Anonuevo Memorial High School
- Pawican National High School
- Ovilla Technical College-Ovilla Institute of Arts & Trade

== Notable personalities ==
- Bea Santiago – Miss International 2013
