= Uson =

Municipality in Masbate, Philippines

- Municipality
- Municipality of Uson
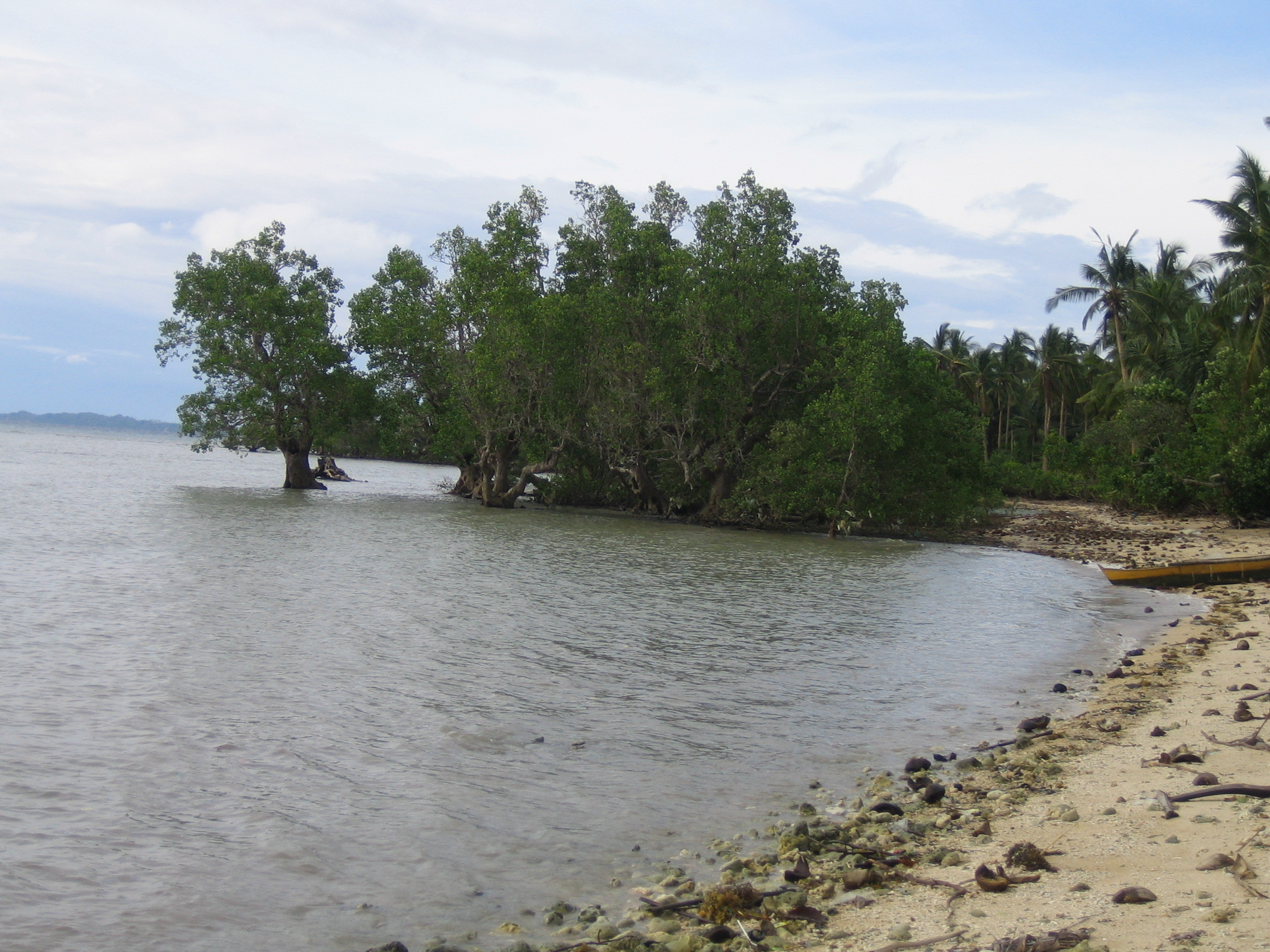
- Beach and Mangroves of Uson

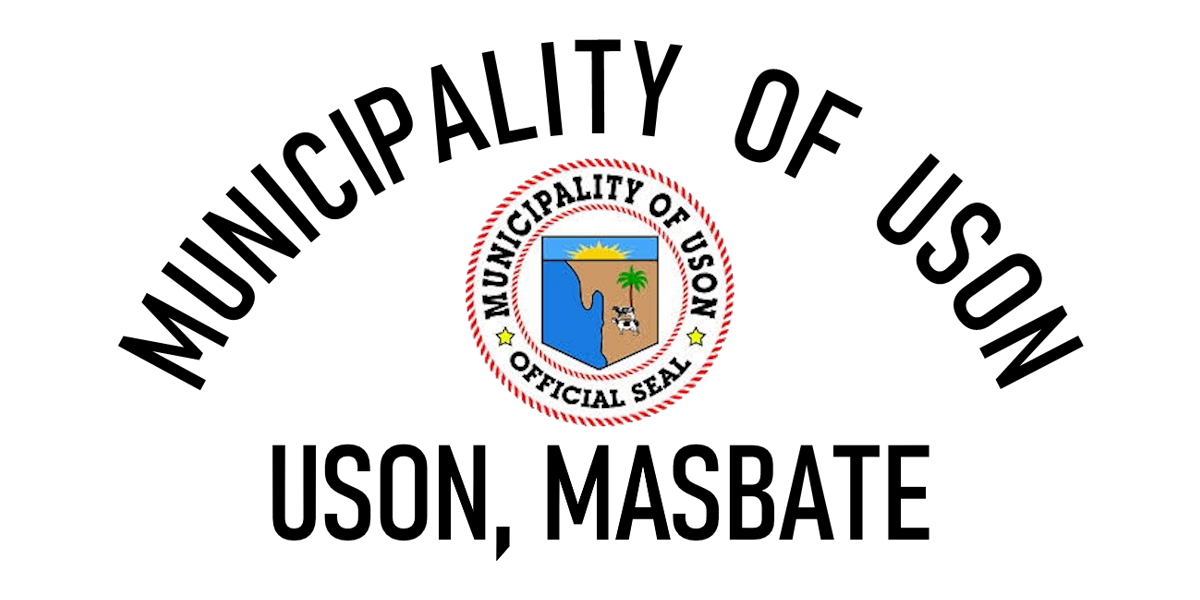
- Flag

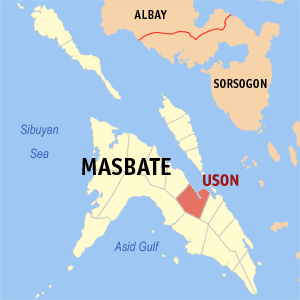
- Map of Masbate with Uson highlighted
- Interactive map of Uson
- Location within the Philippines
- Coordinates: 12°13′31″N 123°47′00″E
- Country: Philippines
- Region: Bicol Region
- Province: Masbate
- District: 3rd district
- Barangays: 35 (see Barangays)

Government
  - Type: Sangguniang Bayan
  - Mayor: Salvadora O. Sanchez
  - Vice Mayor: Felipe U. Sanchez
  - Representative: Wilton T. Kho
  - Municipal Council: Members: Schedar O. Sanchez; Jhona S. Villacorta; Hernando A. Valenzuela; Marijean C. Mondares-Lim; Dante C. Sia; Angelina R. Bandol; Liza C. Orbiso; Alvin Louie M. Lim
  - Electorate: 35,375 voters (2025)

Area
  - Total: 163.20 km^{2} (63.01 sq mi)
- Elevation: 31 m (102 ft)
- Highest elevation: 253 m (830 ft)
- Lowest elevation: 0 m (0 ft)

Population (2024 census)
  - Total: 56,410
  - Density: 345.6/km^{2} (895.2/sq mi)
  - Households: 12,964

Economy
  - Income class: 1st municipal income class
  - Poverty incidence: 23.68% (2023)
  - Revenue: ₱ 242.1 million (2024)
  - Assets: ₱ 896.2 million (2024)
  - Expenditure: ₱ 234.7 million (2024)
  - Liabilities: ₱ 268.5 million (2024)

Service provider
  - Electricity: Masbate Electric Cooperative (MASELCO)
- Time zone: UTC+8 (PST)
- ZIP code: 5402
- PSGC: 0504121000
- IDD : area code: +63 (0)56
- Native languages: Masbateño; Tagalog
- Website: usonmasbate.gov.ph

Uson, officially the Municipality of Uson, is a municipality in the province of Masbate, Philippines. According to the 2024 census, it has a population of 56,410 people.

== History ==
Uson was created as a municipality through Executive Order No. 244 signed by President Elpidio Quirino on July 18, 1949.

In November 1966, municipal councilor Jose Regular Sr. was killed trying to defend residents and mayor Luciano G. Capellan in the barrio Buenavista from a frenzied assailant with a bolo knife; the assailant, known only as "Bravante", was later killed by the townsfolk themselves.

== Geography ==
Uson is bounded by the municipality of Mobo on the north with the Balatucan river; on the east Uson is bounded by the Barangay Balocawe of the municipality of Dimasalang; on the south it is bounded by the Baldosa river and Palo Bandera of Cawayan; on the west the municipality is bounded by Milagros. Uson is 38 kilometres (24 mi) southeast of Masbate City and located on Uson Bay which has an approximate area of 15 square kilometres (5.8 sq mi).

With and elevation of 604 metres (1,982 ft) above sea level, Mount Uac is the highest point of the municipality. The mountain borders the three municipalities of Uson, Mobo and Milagros.

Uson has several rivers, including Balucaw River, Buenavista River, Buracan River, Calpi River, Dap-dap River, Mongahay River, Pinangapugan (Quezon) River, and the Sawang River which all flow into Uson Bay. East of the poblacion a lake can be found, Lake Calero.

=== Seismic activity ===
The Philippine Fault System from which almost all of the recorded strong earthquakes in the Philippines emanated, traverses eastern Uson. As a result, strong seismic activity in the form of frequent earthquakes can be experienced. Link to PHIVOLCS website

=== Climate ===
Climate data for Uson, Masbate
Month	Jan	Feb	Mar	Apr	May	Jun	Jul	Aug	Sep	Oct	Nov	Dec	Year
Mean daily maximum °C (°F)	29 (84)	29 (84)	31 (88)	32 (90)	32 (90)	31 (88)	30 (86)	30 (86)	30 (86)	30 (86)	29 (84)	29 (84)	30 (86)
Mean daily minimum °C (°F)	23 (73)	22 (72)	23 (73)	23 (73)	25 (77)	25 (77)	24 (75)	25 (77)	24 (75)	24 (75)	24 (75)	23 (73)	24 (75)
Average precipitation mm (inches)	39 (1.5)	34 (1.3)	42 (1.7)	36 (1.4)	73 (2.9)	109 (4.3)	118 (4.6)	108 (4.3)	129 (5.1)	136 (5.4)	112 (4.4)	89 (3.5)	1,025 (40.4)
Average rainy days	12.6	9.7	12.0	13.0	20.5	25.3	26.2	24.8	25.2	25.9	21.9	17.9	235
Source: Meteoblue

=== Barangays ===
Uson is politically subdivided into 35 barangays. Each barangay consists of puroks and some have sitios.

- Arado
- Armenia
- Aurora
- Badling
- Bonifacio
- Buenasuerte
- Buenavista
- Campana
- Candelaria
- Centro
- Crossing
- Dapdap
- Del Carmen
- Del Rosario
- Libertad
- Madao
- Mabini
- Magsaysay
- Marcella
- Miaga
- Mongahay
- Morocborocan
- Mabuhay
- Paguihaman
- Panicijan
- Poblacion
- Quezon
- San Isidro
- San Jose
- San Mateo
- San Ramon
- San Vicente
- Santo Cristo
- Sawang
- Simawa

== Demographics ==
Population census of Uson

Year	Pop.	±% p.a.
1903	2,509	—
1960	22,591	+3.93%
1970	32,040	+3.55%
1975	34,256	+1.35%
1980	36,804	+1.44%
1990	37,265	+0.12%
1995	39,251	+0.98%

Year	Pop.	±% p.a.
2000	43,825	+2.39%
2007	50,404	+1.95%
2010	53,602	+2.26%
2015	56,168	+0.89%
2020	57,166	+0.37%
2024	56,410	−0.32%

Source: Philippine Statistics Authority

In the 2024 census, the population of Uson was 56,410 people, with a density of 350 inhabitants per square kilometre or 910 inhabitants per square mile.

== Economy ==
Poverty incidence of Uson (%)

Source: Philippine Statistics Authority

== Education ==
There are two schools district offices which govern all educational institutions within the municipality. They oversee the management and operations of all private and public, from primary to secondary schools. These are the:

- Uson North Schools District
- Uson South Schools District

=== Primary and elementary schools ===
- Arado Elementary School
- Armenia Elementary School
- Aurora Elementary School
- Badling Elementary School
- Bonifacio Elementary School
- Buenasuerte Elementary School
- Buenavista Central School
- Campana Elementary School
- Candelaria Elementary School
- Crossing Elementary School
- Dapdap Elementary School
- Del Carmen Elementary School
- Del Rosario Elementary School
- Eugenio C. Clores Sr. Elementary School
- Felix S. Merioles Elementary School
- Ilihan Elementary School
- Libertad Elementary School
- Mabini Elementary School
- Madao Elementary School
- Magsaysay Elementary School
- Marcella Elementary School
- Miaga Elementary School
- Mongahay Elementary School
- Morocborocan Elementary School
- Nabuhay Elementary School
- Paguihaman Elementary School
- Panisijan Elementary School
- Quezon Elementary School
- San Isidro Elementary School
- San Jose Elementary School
- San Ramon Elementary School
- San Vicente Elementary School
- Sawang Elementary School
- Simawa Elementary School
- Sto. Cristo Elementary School
- Uson Central School

=== Secondary schools ===
- Buenavista National High School
- Centro Integrated School
- Del Carmen National High School
- Masbate Institute of Science and Technology
- San Ramon National High School
- Simawa National High School
- Temistocles A. Merioles Sr. Memorial High School
- Uson National High School
