= Dimasalang =

Municipality in Masbate, Philippines

- Municipality
- Municipality of Dimasalang
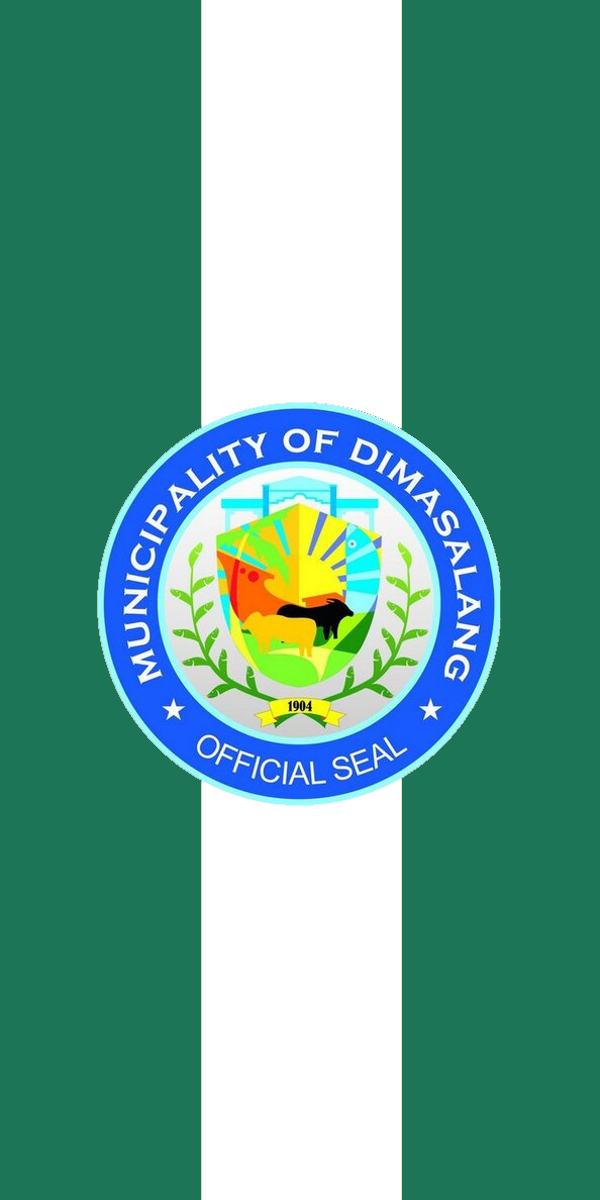
- Flag

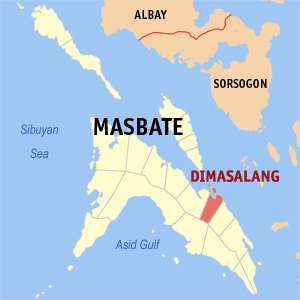
- Map of Masbate with Dimasalang highlighted
- Interactive map of Dimasalang
- Location within the Philippines
- Coordinates: 12°11′36″N 123°51′30″E
- Country: Philippines
- Region: Bicol Region
- Province: Masbate
- District: 3rd district
- Barangays: 20 (see Barangays)

Government
  - Type: Sangguniang Bayan
  - Mayor: Michael Demph D. Naga
  - Vice Mayor: Wilfredo D. Lim
  - Representative: Wilton T. Kho
  - Municipal Council: Members: Marigin M. Cuevas; Vergie A. Abaño; Vicente A. Atibagos; Katherine D. Abila; Marites J. Naga; Ronie L. Roluna Sr.; Rommil Anthony E. Mijares; Florante S. Bulalaque
  - Electorate: 17,532 voters (2025)

Area
  - Total: 148.07 km^{2} (57.17 sq mi)
- Elevation: 38 m (125 ft)
- Highest elevation: 205 m (673 ft)
- Lowest elevation: 0 m (0 ft)

Population (2024 census)
  - Total: 25,054
  - Density: 169.20/km^{2} (438.24/sq mi)
  - Households: 5,761

Economy
  - Income class: 3rd municipal income class
  - Poverty incidence: 18.79% (2023)
  - Revenue: ₱ 157.1 million (2024)
  - Assets: ₱ 747.7 million (2024)
  - Expenditure: ₱ 164.1 million (2024)
  - Liabilities: ₱ 41.2 million (2024)

Service provider
  - Electricity: Masbate Electric Cooperative (MASELCO)
- Time zone: UTC+8 (PST)
- ZIP code: 5403
- PSGC: 0504108000
- IDD : area code: +63 (0)56
- Native languages: Masbateño; Tagalog
- Website: dimasalang.gov.ph

Dimasalang, officially the Municipality of Dimasalang, is a municipality in the province of Masbate, Philippines. According to the 2024 census, it has a population of 25,054 people.

== History ==
In 1951, the barrios of Palanas, Nipa, Nabangig, Banco, Pina, Maanahao, Salvacion, Antipolo, Malatawan, Intusan, Miabas, San Antonio, Libtong, Malibas, Santa Cruz, Bontod, and Cabil-isan were separated to form the town of Palanas.

== Geography ==
Dimasalang is 46 kilometres (29 mi) from Masbate City.

=== Barangays ===
Dimasalang is politically subdivided into 20 barangays. Each barangay consists of puroks and some have sitios.

- Balantay
- Balocawe
- Banahao
- Buenaflor
- Buracan
- Cabanoyoan
- Cabrera
- Cadulan
- Calabad
- Canomay
- Divisoria
- Gaid
- Gregorio Aliňo (Pia-ong)
- Magcaraguit
- Mambog
- Poblacion
- Rizal
- San Vicente
- Suba
- T.R. Yangco (Yanco)

=== Climate ===
Climate data for Dimasalang, Masbate
Month	Jan	Feb	Mar	Apr	May	Jun	Jul	Aug	Sep	Oct	Nov	Dec	Year
Mean daily maximum °C (°F)	29 (84)	29 (84)	31 (88)	32 (90)	32 (90)	31 (88)	30 (86)	30 (86)	30 (86)	30 (86)	29 (84)	29 (84)	30 (86)
Mean daily minimum °C (°F)	23 (73)	22 (72)	23 (73)	23 (73)	25 (77)	25 (77)	24 (75)	25 (77)	24 (75)	24 (75)	24 (75)	23 (73)	24 (75)
Average precipitation mm (inches)	39 (1.5)	34 (1.3)	42 (1.7)	36 (1.4)	73 (2.9)	109 (4.3)	118 (4.6)	108 (4.3)	129 (5.1)	136 (5.4)	112 (4.4)	89 (3.5)	1,025 (40.4)
Average rainy days	12.6	9.7	12.0	13.0	20.5	25.3	26.2	24.8	25.2	25.9	21.9	17.9	235
Source: Meteoblue

== Demographics ==
Population census of Dimasalang

Year	Pop.	±% p.a.
1918	8,368	—
1939	24,471	+5.24%
1948	30,813	+2.59%
1960	14,896	−5.88%
1970	19,266	+2.60%
1975	19,628	+0.37%
1980	19,252	−0.39%
1990	17,367	−1.03%

Year	Pop.	±% p.a.
1995	20,566	+3.22%
2000	21,550	+1.01%
2007	22,723	+0.73%
2010	25,245	+3.90%
2015	26,192	+0.70%
2020	24,909	−1.05%
2024	25,054	+0.14%

Source: Philippine Statistics Authority

In the 2024 census, the population of Dimasalang was 25,054 people, with a density of 170 inhabitants per square kilometre or 440 inhabitants per square mile.

== Economy ==
Poverty incidence of Dimasalang (%)

Source: Philippine Statistics Authority

== Education ==
The Dimasalang Schools District Office governs all educational institutions within the municipality. It oversees the management and operations of all private and public, from primary to secondary schools.

=== Primary and elementary schools ===
- Balantay Elementary School
- Balocawe Elementary School
- Buenaflor Elementary School
- Buracan Elementary School
- Cabanuyoan Elementary School
- Cabrera Elementary School
- Cadulan Elementary School
- Calabad Elementary School
- Canomay Elementary School
- Deagan Elementary School
- Dimasalang Central School
- Divisoria Elementary School
- Eden's Christian Academy
- Gaid Elementary School
- Gregorio Alino Elementary School
- Magcaraguit Elementary School
- Mambog Elementary School
- Mandaon Synergy School
- N.B. Cabrera Elementary School
- Ranile Elementary school
- Rizal Elemenatry School
- San Vicente Elementary School
- T.R. Yangco Elementary School

=== Secondary schools ===
- Buracan National High School
- Dimasalang National High School
- Masbate Sports Academy
- Orlando B. Tepait High School
