= Palanas =

Municipality in Masbate, Philippines

- Municipality
- Municipality of Palanas
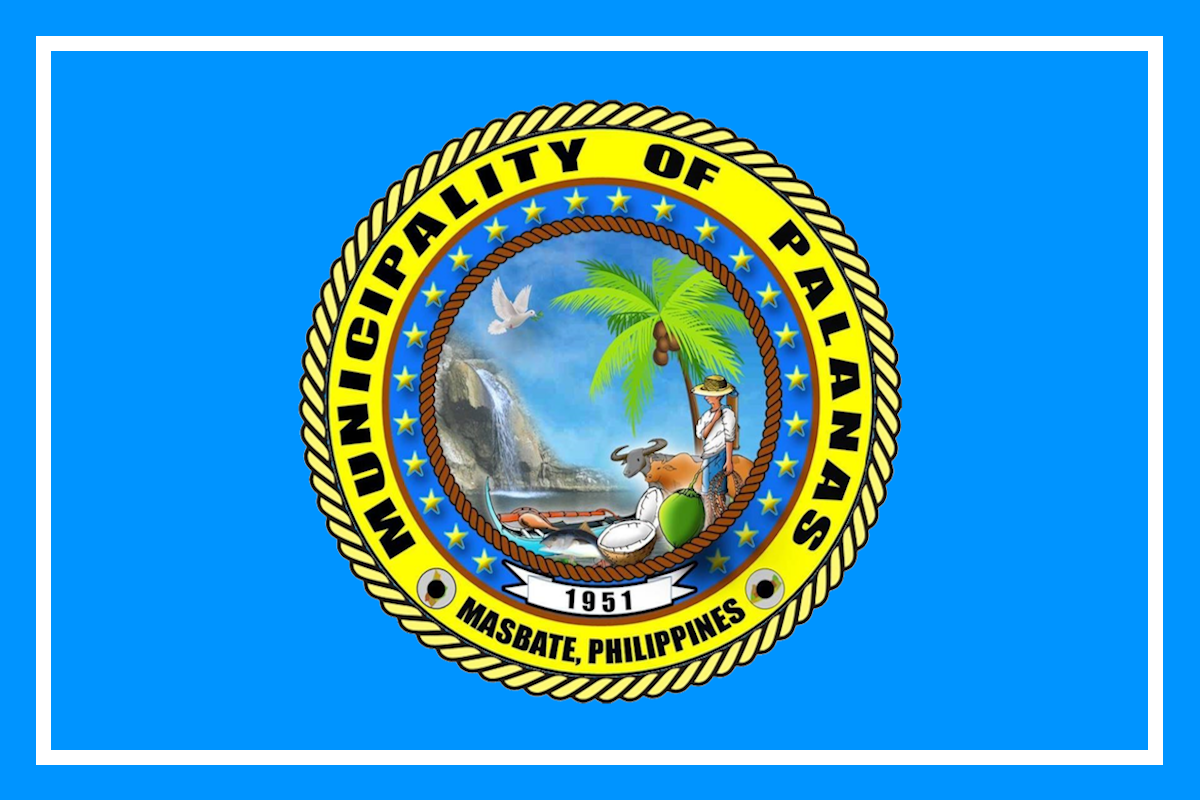
- Flag Seal

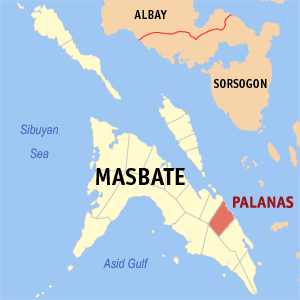
- Map of Masbate with Palanas highlighted
- Interactive map of Palanas
- Location within the Philippines
- Coordinates: 12°08′47″N 123°55′19″E
- Country: Philippines
- Region: Bicol Region
- Province: Masbate
- District: 3rd district
- Founded: June 11, 1951
- Barangays: 24 (see Barangays)

Government
  - Type: Sangguniang Bayan
  - Mayor: Roscelle A. Eramiz
  - Vice Mayor: Rudy L. Alvarez
  - Representative: Wilton T. Kho
  - Municipal Council: Members: Jonathan A. Abenir; Letecia A. Tamayo; Annie S. Alvarez; Diego U. Rumo; Magdalena A. Pogoy; Roderick A. Almanzor; Alona V. Pillejera; Editha C. Salazar
  - Electorate: 19,383 voters (2025)

Area
  - Total: 171.10 km^{2} (66.06 sq mi)
- Elevation: 53 m (174 ft)
- Highest elevation: 390 m (1,280 ft)
- Lowest elevation: 0 m (0 ft)

Population (2024 census)
  - Total: 28,133
  - Density: 164.42/km^{2} (425.86/sq mi)
  - Households: 6,479

Economy
  - Income class: 3rd municipal income class
  - Poverty incidence: 20.03% (2023)
  - Revenue: ₱ 178.7 million (2022)
  - Assets: ₱ 421.9 million (2022)
  - Expenditure: ₱ 160.9 million (2022)
  - Liabilities: ₱ 172.2 million (2022)

Service provider
  - Electricity: Masbate Electric Cooperative (MASELCO)
- Time zone: UTC+8 (PST)
- ZIP code: 5404
- PSGC: 0504115000
- IDD : area code: +63 (0)56
- Native languages: Masbateño; Tagalog

Palanas, officially the Municipality of Palanas, is a municipality in the province of Masbate, Philippines. According to the 2024 census, it has a population of 28,133 people.

== History ==
Palanas was created in 1951 from the barrios of Palanas, Nipa, Nabangig, Banco, Pina, Maanahao, Salvacion, Antipolo, Malatawan, Intusan, Miabas, San Antonio, Libtong, Malibas, Santa Cruz, Bontod and Cabil-isan of Dimasalang. It annually celebrates "Pasayaw sa Leon" Festival (The Lion Dance Festival) every 19 December.

== Geography ==
Palanas is 56 kilometres (35 mi) from Masbate City.

=== Barangays ===
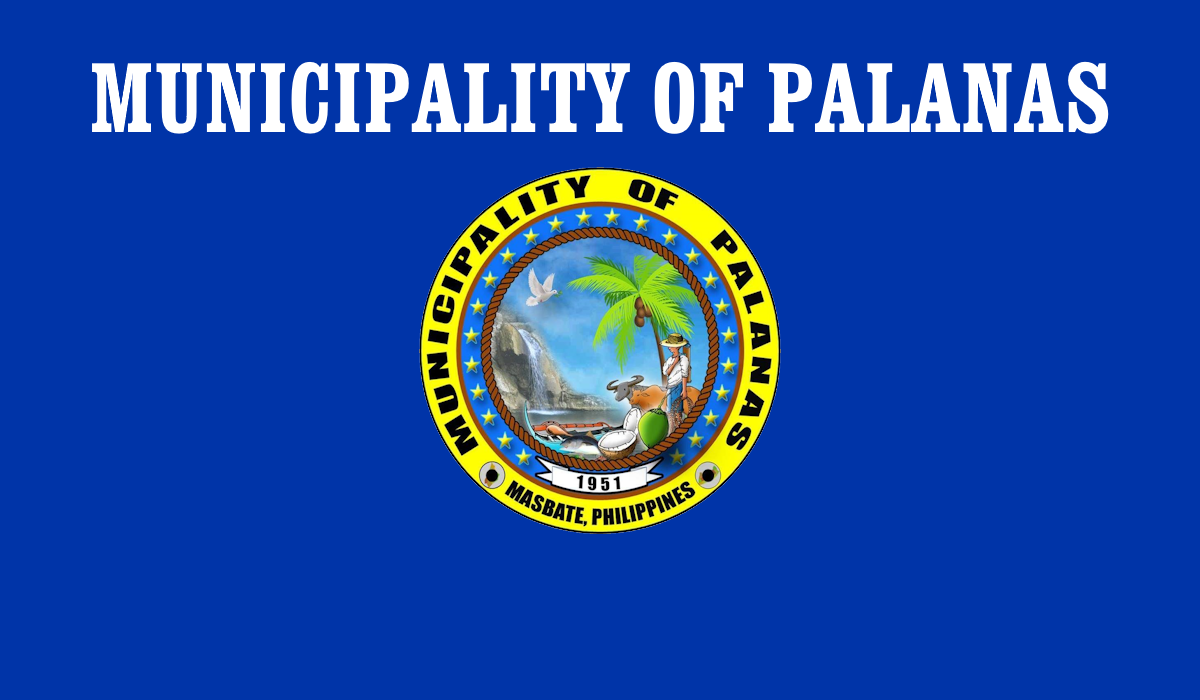
Former flag of Palanas

Palanas is politically subdivided into 24 barangays. Each barangay consists of puroks and some have sitios.

- Antipolo
- Banco
- Biga-a
- Bontod
- Buenasuerte
- Intusan
- Jose A. Abenir Sr. (Libtong)
- Maanahao
- Mabini
- Malibas
- Maravilla
- Matugnao
- Miabas
- Nabangig
- Nipa
- Parina
- Piña
- Poblacion
- Salvacion
- San Antonio
- San Carlos
- San Isidro
- Santa Cruz
- Malatawan

=== Climate ===
Climate data for Palanas, Masbate
Month	Jan	Feb	Mar	Apr	May	Jun	Jul	Aug	Sep	Oct	Nov	Dec	Year
Mean daily maximum °C (°F)	29 (84)	29 (84)	31 (88)	32 (90)	32 (90)	31 (88)	30 (86)	30 (86)	30 (86)	30 (86)	29 (84)	29 (84)	30 (86)
Mean daily minimum °C (°F)	23 (73)	22 (72)	23 (73)	23 (73)	25 (77)	25 (77)	24 (75)	25 (77)	24 (75)	24 (75)	24 (75)	23 (73)	24 (75)
Average precipitation mm (inches)	39 (1.5)	34 (1.3)	42 (1.7)	36 (1.4)	73 (2.9)	109 (4.3)	118 (4.6)	108 (4.3)	129 (5.1)	136 (5.4)	112 (4.4)	89 (3.5)	1,025 (40.4)
Average rainy days	12.6	9.7	12.0	13.0	20.5	25.3	26.2	24.8	25.2	25.9	21.9	17.9	235
Source: Meteoblue

== Demographics ==
Population census of Palanas

Year	Pop.	±% p.a.
1903	2,286	—
1960	21,001	+3.97%
1970	25,848	+2.10%
1975	26,916	+0.82%
1980	25,369	−1.18%
1990	21,763	−1.52%
1995	23,580	+1.51%

Year	Pop.	±% p.a.
2000	24,666	+0.97%
2007	24,830	+0.09%
2010	25,501	+0.98%
2015	26,222	+0.53%
2020	27,322	+0.87%
2024	28,133	+0.70%

Source: Philippine Statistics Authority

In the 2024 census, the population of Palanas was 28,133 people, with a density of 160 inhabitants per square kilometre or 410 inhabitants per square mile.

== Economy ==
Poverty incidence of Palanas (%)

Source: Philippine Statistics Authority

== Education ==
There are two schools district offices which govern all educational institutions within the municipality. They oversee the management and operations of all private and public, from primary to secondary schools. These are the:

- Palanas North Schools District
- Palanas South Schools District

=== Primary and elementary schools ===
- Aniano Almanzor Elementary School
- Antipolo Elementary School
- Apolinario Etang Elementary School
- Banco Elementary School
- Bibiano A. Avenir Elementary School
- Biga-a Elementary School
- Bontod Elementary School
- Buenasuerte Elementary School
- Catoogan Elementary School
- Jose A. Abenir Sr. Elementary School
- Lucio Atabay Memorial Elementary School
- Maanahao Elementary School
- Mabini Elementary School
- Malatawan Elementary School
- Malibas Elementary School
- Matugnao Elementary School
- Nabangig Central School
- Palanas North Central School
- Pedro A. Basas Elementary School
- Salvacion Elementary School
- San Antonio Elementary School
- San Carlos Elementary School
- San Isidro Elementary School
- San Mariano Elementary School
- St. John Marie Vianney Diocesan School
- Sta. Cruz Elementary School
- Teofilo T. Tambago Elementary School

=== Secondary schools ===
- Holy Name Academy
- Maravilla National High School
- Miabas National High School
- Palanas National Agriculture High School
- Rondina-Atendido National High School
- Salvacion High School
- San Carlos High School
