= Baleno, Masbate =

Municipality in Masbate, Philippines

Baleno
- Municipality
- Municipality of Baleno
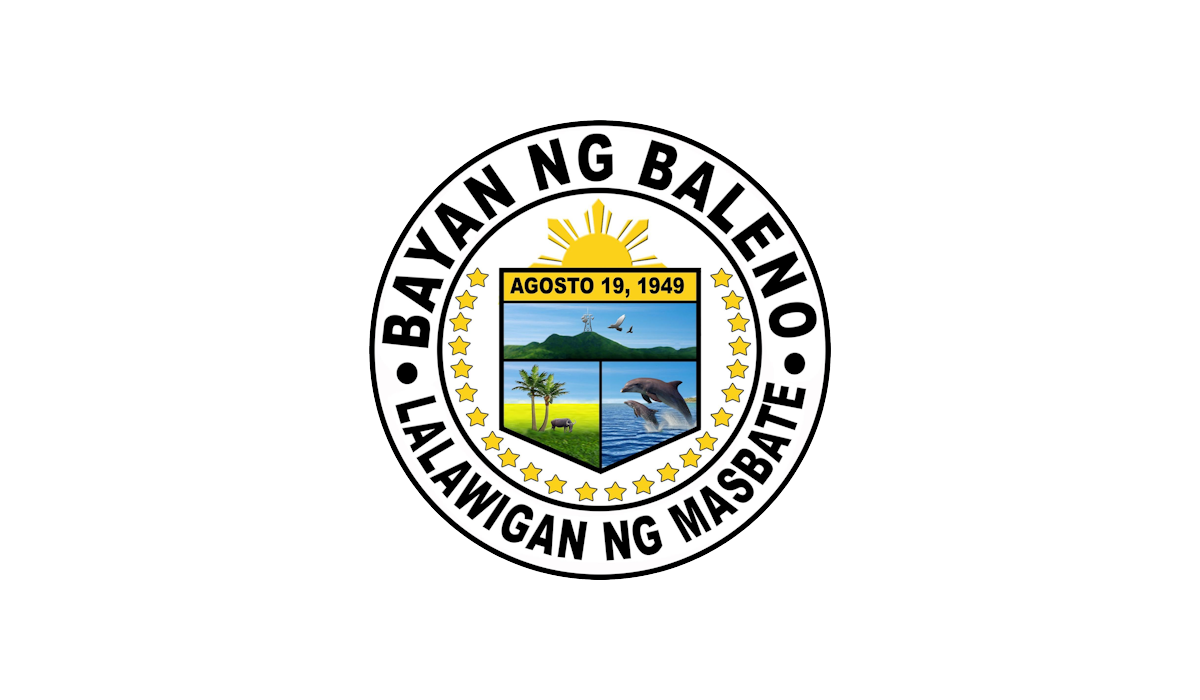
- Flag

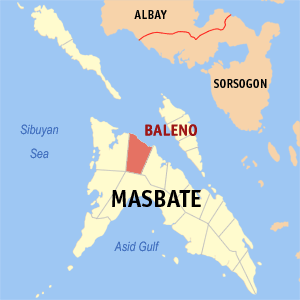
- Map of Masbate with Baleno highlighted
- Interactive map of Baleno
- Location within the Philippines
- Coordinates: 12°28′26″N 123°29′54″E
- Country: Philippines
- Region: Bicol Region
- Province: Masbate
- District: 2nd district
- Barangays: 24 (see Barangays)

Government
  - Type: Sangguniang Bayan
  - Mayor: Romeo C. dela Rosa
  - Vice Mayor: Marites C. dela Rosa
  - Representative: Elisa T. Kho
  - Municipal Council: Members: Rommarie Angelei C. dela Rosa; Blessy C. Moreno; Jorge L. Licup IV; Romeo M. Cabug; Daisy R. Bello; Noel S. Cabug; Jojit C. Ramirez; Ma. Dyenina L. Barbudo
  - Electorate: 19,315 voters (2025)

Area
  - Total: 204.38 km^{2} (78.91 sq mi)
- Elevation: 41 m (135 ft)
- Highest elevation: 317 m (1,040 ft)
- Lowest elevation: 0 m (0 ft)

Population (2024 census)
  - Total: 28,787
  - Density: 140.85/km^{2} (364.80/sq mi)
  - Households: 6,529

Economy
  - Income class: 2nd municipal income class
  - Poverty incidence: 19.54% (2023)
  - Revenue: ₱ 173.2 million (2024)
  - Assets: ₱ 466.2 million (2024)
  - Expenditure: ₱ 165.1 million (2024)
  - Liabilities: ₱ 171.8 million (2024)

Service provider
  - Electricity: Masbate Electric Cooperative (MASELCO)
- Time zone: UTC+8 (PST)
- ZIP code: 5413
- PSGC: 0504102000
- IDD : area code: +63 (0)56
- Native languages: Masbateño; Tagalog
- Website: www.balenotown.com

Baleno, officially the Municipality of Baleno, is a municipality in the province of Masbate, Philippines. According to the 2024 census, it has a population of 28,787 people.

== History ==
Baleno was created as a municipality through Executive Order No. 244 signed by President Elpidio Quirino on July 18, 1949.

== Geography ==
Baleno is 35 kilometres (22 mi) from Masbate City.

=== Barangays ===
Baleno is politically subdivided into 24 barangays. Each barangay consists of puroks and some have sitios.

- Baao
- Banase
- Batuila
- Cagara
- Cagpandan
- Cancahorao
- Canjonday
- Docol
- Eastern Capsay
- Gabi
- Gangao
- Lagta
- Lahong Proper
- Lahong Interior
- Lipata
- Madancalan
- Magdalena
- Manoboc
- Ubongon Diot
- Poblacion
- Polot
- Potoson
- Sog-Ong
- Tinapian

=== Climate ===
Climate data for Baleno, Masbate
Month	Jan	Feb	Mar	Apr	May	Jun	Jul	Aug	Sep	Oct	Nov	Dec	Year
Mean daily maximum °C (°F)	29 (84)	29 (84)	31 (88)	32 (90)	32 (90)	31 (88)	30 (86)	30 (86)	30 (86)	30 (86)	29 (84)	29 (84)	30 (86)
Mean daily minimum °C (°F)	23 (73)	22 (72)	23 (73)	23 (73)	25 (77)	25 (77)	24 (75)	25 (77)	24 (75)	24 (75)	24 (75)	23 (73)	24 (75)
Average precipitation mm (inches)	39 (1.5)	34 (1.3)	42 (1.7)	36 (1.4)	73 (2.9)	109 (4.3)	118 (4.6)	108 (4.3)	129 (5.1)	136 (5.4)	112 (4.4)	89 (3.5)	1,025 (40.4)
Average rainy days	12.6	9.7	12.0	13.0	20.5	25.3	26.2	24.8	25.2	25.9	21.9	17.9	235
Source: Meteoblue

== Demographics ==
Population census of Baleno

Year	Pop.	±% p.a.
1903	1,955	—
1960	12,278	+3.28%
1970	15,335	+2.25%
1975	17,848	+3.09%
1980	19,114	+1.38%
1990	17,390	−0.94%
1995	18,105	+0.76%

Year	Pop.	±% p.a.
2000	19,897	+2.04%
2007	21,639	+1.16%
2010	24,401	+4.47%
2015	26,096	+1.29%
2020	28,855	+2.14%
2024	28,787	−0.06%

Source: Philippine Statistics Authority

In the 2024 census, the population of Baleno was 28,787 people, with a density of 140 inhabitants per square kilometre or 360 inhabitants per square mile.

== Economy ==
Poverty incidence of Baleno

Source: Philippine Statistics Authority

== Points of activity ==
Baleno is a median town for buses coming from Metro Manila and Bicol to various towns beyond Baleno, including Aroroy, Balud and Mandaon.

Barangay Poblacion is the seat of the Municipal Government, and includes Plaza Valdemoro. Its parochial church is heavily devoted to the Our Lady of the Pillar a notable Christian figure in the Nueva Caceres (Archdiocese of Naga). Baleno has one Catholic school, the Liceo de Baleno, operated by the Diocese of Masbate and has several national-established high schools, namely Baleno National High School (Poblacion), Lagta National High School (Barangay Lagta), Lahong National High School (Barangay Lahong Proper), Magdalena National High School (Barangay Magdalena), and Amador-Bello High School (Barangay Gangao).

Aside from the prominence of Roman Catholicism and traces of sects and Christian groups such as Iglesia ni Cristo and Jehovah's Witnesses, the municipality is the seat of the Congregation of Our Lady of Rocks Pilgrimage Church (Ina Poon Bato Simbahang Naglalakbay), considered as a Filipino Marian Catholic Church, wherein it holds to the belief of Mother Mary as the Third Person of the Holy Trinity.

== Education ==
The Baleno Schools District Office governs all educational institutions within the municipality. It oversees the management and operations of all private and public, from primary to secondary schools.

=== Primary and elementary schools ===
- Baao Elementary School
- Baleno Central School
- Banase Elementary School
- Batuila Elementary School
- Cagara Elementary School
- Cagpandan Elementary School
- Cancahorao Elementary School
- Canjonday Elementary School
- Catalino M. Esquilona
- Docol Elementary School
- Gabi Elementary School
- Gangao Elementary School
- Lahong Elementary School
- Lahong Int. Elementary School
- Liceo de Baleno
- Lipata Elementary School
- Madancalan Elementary School
- Magdalena Elementary School
- Manoboc Elementary School
- Our Lady of the Pillar Diocesan School
- Polot Elementary School
- Potoson Elementary School
- Sog-ong Elementary School
- St. Bernard of Clairvaux Mission School
- Tinapian Elementary School
- Ubongan Diot Elementary School

=== Secondary schools ===
- Amador-Bello High School
- Baleno National High School
- Eastern Capsay Integrated School
- Lagta National High School
- Lahong National High School
- Magdalena National High School
