= Aroroy =

Municipality in Masbate, Philippines

- Municipality
- Municipality of Aroroy
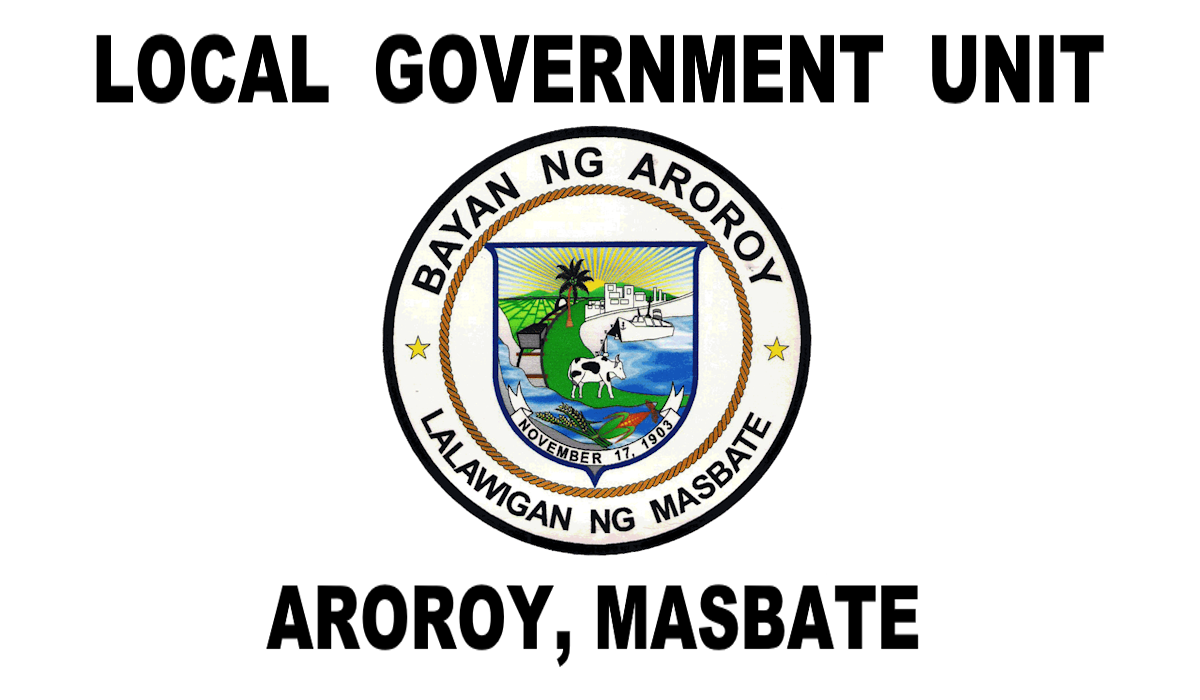
- Flag

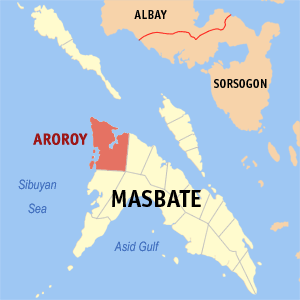
- Map of Masbate with Aroroy highlighted
- Interactive map of Aroroy
- Location within the Philippines
- Coordinates: 12°30′45″N 123°23′56″E
- Country: Philippines
- Region: Bicol Region
- Province: Masbate
- District: 2nd district
- Founded: 1904
- Barangays: 41 (see Barangays)

Government
  - Type: Sangguniang Bayan
  - Mayor: Arturo B. Virtucio
  - Vice Mayor: Valentin C. Alonzo
  - Representative: Elisa T. Kho
  - Municipal Council: Members: Archimedes R. Suguitao; Lito B. Briones; Arturo R. Virtucio II; Jovimel P. Jaquilmo; Julius M. Tuason; Susan D. Valera; Rudy R. Rañola; Vicente R. Cioco
  - Electorate: 55,077 voters (2025)

Area
  - Total: 440.30 km^{2} (170.00 sq mi)
- Elevation: 32 m (105 ft)
- Highest elevation: 346 m (1,135 ft)
- Lowest elevation: 0 m (0 ft)

Population (2024 census)
  - Total: 89,154
  - Density: 202.48/km^{2} (524.43/sq mi)
  - Households: 18,792

Economy
  - Income class: 1st municipal income class
  - Poverty incidence: 23.7% (2023)
  - Revenue: ₱ 689.6 million (2024)
  - Assets: ₱ 2,792 million (2024)
  - Expenditure: ₱ 607.7 million (2024)
  - Liabilities: ₱ 494.3 million (2024)

Service provider
  - Electricity: Masbate Electric Cooperative (MASELCO)
- Time zone: UTC+8 (PST)
- ZIP code: 5414
- PSGC: 0504101000
- IDD : area code: +63 (0)56
- Native languages: Masbateño; Tagalog
- Website: www.aroroy.gov.ph

Aroroy, officially the Municipality of Aroroy (Masbatenyo: Banwa san Aroroy, Hiligaynon: Banwa sang Aroroy), is a municipality in the province of Masbate, Philippines. According to the 2024 census, it has a population of 89,154 people.

It is known for the Kalanay Cave, one of the most important archaeological sites in the province of Masbate.

== Etymology ==
The town of Aroroy (Al-Oroy its former name), which came from the Spanish word for gold-"oro", was established back in 1822 upon the arrival of a Chinese expedition. The Chinese fleet was composed of seven vessels called "pancos". They entered Lanang River, which is part of Puerto Barrera, the former name of the area now covered by Aroroy. A Moro named Talcum guided this expedition. They were sent by the Chinese merchants who came to Aroroy to explore for gold coins near Lanang River.

== History ==
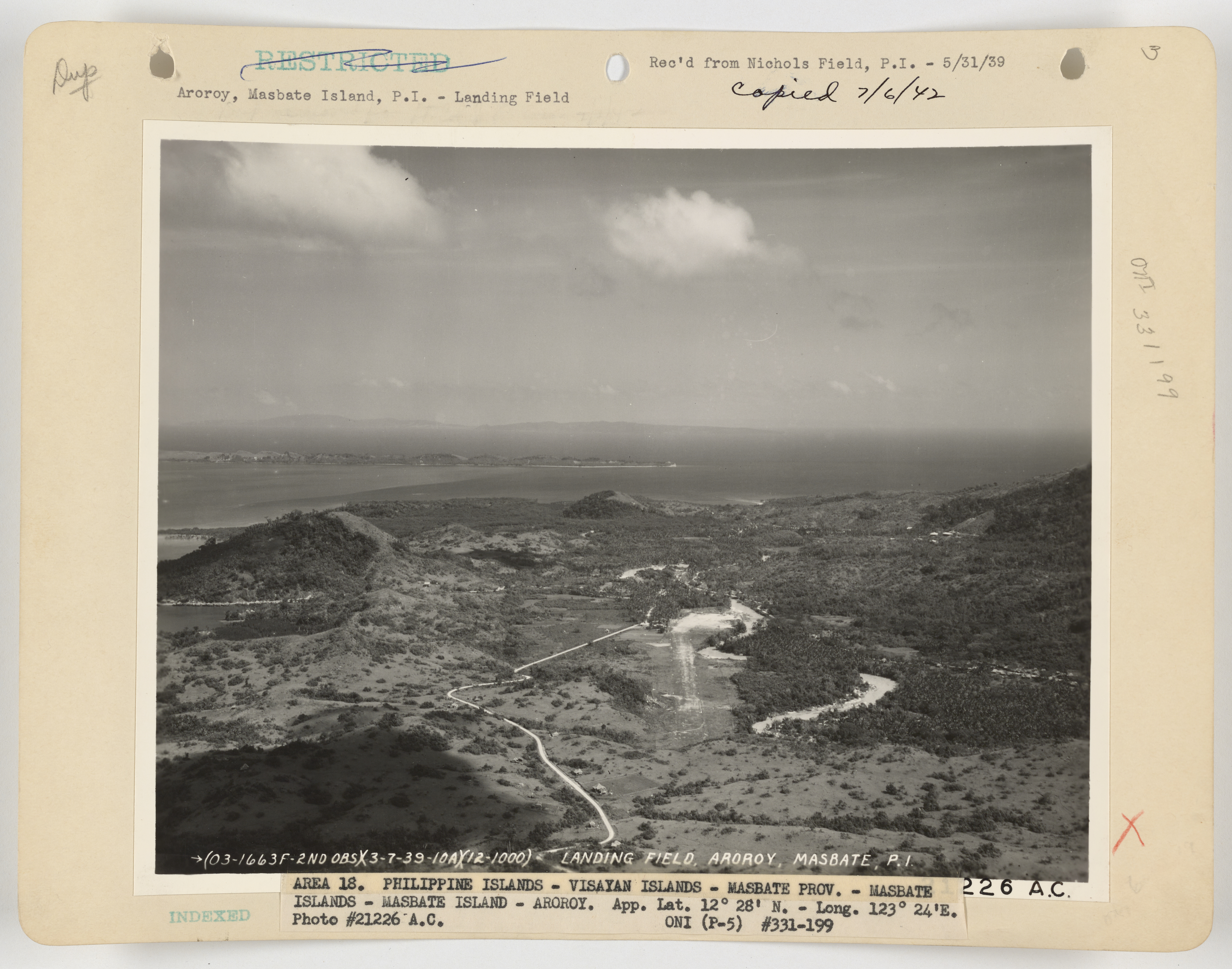
Aerial view of Aroroy, 1939

When the present Masbate province was still part of the province of Ibalon (present-day Albay), a captain from the Spanish Army named Gregorio Cordero of Tondo, Manila was exiled in Masbate for the killing of his superior officer. Instead of being incarcerated in the castle of San Pascual in Burias Island, where political and military prisoners were imprisoned by the Captain-General of the Philippine Islands, he was brought to Masbate. Accompanied by his two daughters and a son, they established residency in the Port of Magdalena, Masbate town. He had with him four "Faluas" or Spanish vessels named – Jesus Maria Y Jose, Sacramento, Salvacion and Santa Ana for use in the vigilance against Moro pirates who preyed on the three islands of Masbate, Ticao and Burias.

When the Spaniards discovered the Chinese expedition, Cordero and about 150 men, who believed him to possess amulets (anting-anting) which made him invulnerable, sailed to Lanang River to find out the nationality of the said seven vessels which entered Lanang River. When investigated as to where they were going, the aliens answered in their Chinese manner that they were going to "Al-Oroy" meaning to the Gold or in Spanish “Al-oro”. Not satisfied with the results of the investigation with the belief that these are Moro vessels, Cordero and his men established their headquarters for over three months in the present poblacion of Aroroy, which was known as Al-Oroy taken from the Chinese reply.

Another expedition of Spaniards from Manila headed by a certain Sarmiento came to explore the gold in the river near Al-oroy in 1861. This expedition was aided by natives of Al-oroy, including Toribio Bunayag, Jose Pusing, Norberto Pusing and Protacio Fabon. The natives abandoned the expedition during the same year due to numerous attacks. This led to the death of Sarmiento and since then, the said river was called Rio Guinobatan or “River of Assaults”.

Since then the site of Al-Oroy became a "visita" or barrio of the town of Baleno but later was transferred to the town of San Agustin in the interior part of Port Barrera. In 1904, when the towns of Baleno and San Agustin were combined, the name Al-Oroy was changed to Aroroy. It was also in 1904 when Aroroy became a municipality because of its strategic location. San Agustin now a barangay of Aroroy.

== Geography ==
Aroroy is geographically located between 12 degrees and 13 degrees Latitude and 123 degrees and 124 degrees Longitude or at the northernmost part of the province of Masbate, Bicol Region. It is bounded on the north by the Masbate Pass, to the East by the municipality of Baleno, to the West by the Sibuyan Sea and to the South by the municipalities of Milagros and Mandaon. It is 50 kilometres (31 mi) from Masbate City.

=== Barangays ===
Aroroy is politically subdivided into 41 barangays. Each barangay consists of puroks and some have sitios.

- Ambolong
- Amoroy
- Amotag
- Baga-uma
- Balawing
- Balete
- Bangon
- Cabangcalan
- Cabas-An
- Calanay
- Capsay
- Concepcion (formerly Sawmill)
- Dayhagan
- Don Pablo Dela Rosa
- Gumahang
- Jaboyoan
- Lanang
- Luy-a
- Macabug
- Malubi
- Managanaga
- Manamoc
- Mariposa
- Mataba
- Matalangtalang
- Matongog
- Nabongsoran
- Pangle
- Panique
- Pinanaan
- Poblacion
- Puro
- San Agustin
- San Isidro
- Sawang
- Syndicate
- Talabaan
- Talib
- Tigbao
- Tinago
- Tinigban

=== Climate ===
Climate data for Aroroy, Masbate
Month	Jan	Feb	Mar	Apr	May	Jun	Jul	Aug	Sep	Oct	Nov	Dec	Year
Mean daily maximum °C (°F)	27 (81)	28 (82)	29 (84)	31 (88)	31 (88)	30 (86)	29 (84)	30 (86)	29 (84)	29 (84)	29 (84)	28 (82)	29 (84)
Mean daily minimum °C (°F)	22 (72)	21 (70)	22 (72)	23 (73)	24 (75)	25 (77)	25 (77)	25 (77)	25 (77)	24 (75)	23 (73)	23 (73)	24 (74)
Average precipitation mm (inches)	65 (2.6)	44 (1.7)	42 (1.7)	39 (1.5)	87 (3.4)	150 (5.9)	184 (7.2)	153 (6.0)	163 (6.4)	154 (6.1)	127 (5.0)	100 (3.9)	1,308 (51.4)
Average rainy days	13.9	9.2	11.1	12.5	19.6	24.3	26.5	25.0	25.5	24.4	19.4	15.1	226.5
Source: Meteoblue

== Demographics ==
Population census of Aroroy

Year	Pop.	±% p.a.
1918	9,836	—
1939	31,289	+5.67%
1948	23,888	−2.95%
1960	18,371	−2.16%
1970	28,624	+4.53%
1975	30,457	+1.25%
1980	38,618	+4.86%
1990	53,060	+3.23%

Year	Pop.	±% p.a.
1995	55,110	+0.71%
2000	58,751	+1.38%
2007	62,635	+0.89%
2010	76,139	+7.36%
2015	86,168	+2.38%
2020	88,351	+0.53%
2024	89,154	+0.22%

Source: Philippine Statistics Authority

In the 2024 census, the population of Aroroy was 89,154 people, with a density of 200 inhabitants per square kilometre or 520 inhabitants per square mile.

== Economy ==
Poverty incidence of Aroroy

Source: Philippine Statistics Authority

== Education ==
There are two schools district offices which govern all educational institutions within the municipality. They oversee the management and operations of all private and public, from primary to secondary schools. These are the:

- Aroroy East Schools District
- Aroroy West Schools District

=== Primary and elementary schools ===
- Amoroy Elementary School
- Amotag Elementary School
- Aroroy East Central School
- Aroroy Golden Riches Academy
- Aroroy West Elementary School
- Balawing Elementary School
- Balete Elementary School
- Bancil Elementary School
- Bienvenido R. Bulalacao Memorial Elementary School
- Bonacan Elementary School
- Bugui Primary School
- Cabangcalan Elementary School
- Cabas-an Elementary School
- Capsay Elementary School
- Calanay Elementary School
- Col. Vicente E. Maristela Sr. Memorial Elementary School (Matalangtalang Elementary School)
- Concepcion Elementary School
- Dayhagan Elementary School
- Elisa E. Corpus Elementary School
- Gregorio Dongon Elementary School
- Gumahang Elementary School
- Isidoro F. Calimotan, Sr. Elementary School
- Jaboyoan Elementary School
- Jacinto R. Ramilo Elementary School
- Lanang Elementary School
- Ladiawan Primary School
- Liceo de Aroroy
- Lomocloc Elementary School
- Luy-a Elementary School
- Macabug Elementary School
- Malubi Elementary School
- Malubago Elementary School
- Managanaga Elementary School
- Manamoc Elementary School
- Mandaon Synergy School
- Mariposa Elementary School
- Masbate Learning is Fun Children's Center
- Matongog Elementary School
- Nabongsoran Elementary School
- Pangle Elementary School
- Pinanaan Elementary School
- Puro Elementary School
- Rudy M. Bulalacao Memorial Elementary School
- Rufo C.Pajes Sr. Central School
- San Agustin Elementary School
- San Isidro Elementary School
- St. Rapahel The Archangel Diocesan School
- Syndicate Elementary School
- Talib Elementary School
- Tinago Elementary School
- Yadah Christian School

=== Secondary schools ===
- Amotag National High School
- Aroroy National High School
- Aroroy Stand Alone Senior High School
- Balete High School
- Burias College
- Cabangcalan High School
- Damaso R. Rubia Memorial High School
- Delavin-Rubia High School
- Francisca Conag Lavisto Memorial High School
- Luy-a National High School
- Masbate Polytechnic and Development College
- Mataba Integrated School
- Nabongsoran High School
- Panique National High School
- Purol High School
- Sulpicio T. Condor Sr. National High School
- Teresita C. Young Memorial High School
- Tigbao Integrated School
- Tinigban National High School

=== Higher educational institutions ===
- Aroroy Municipal College
- Burias College
- Masbate Polytechnic and Development College
