= Mobo, Masbate =

Municipality in Masbate, Philippines

Mobo
- Municipality
- Municipality of Mobo
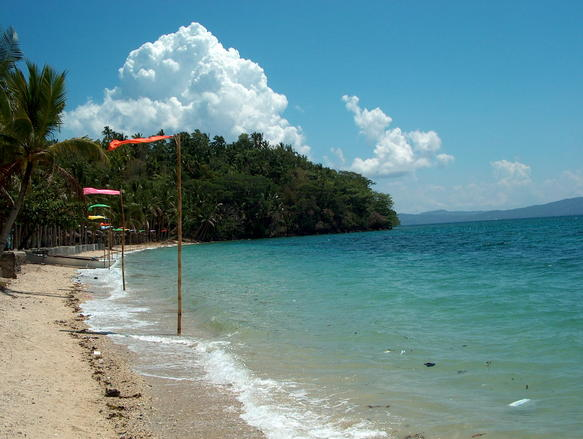
- Bituon Beach

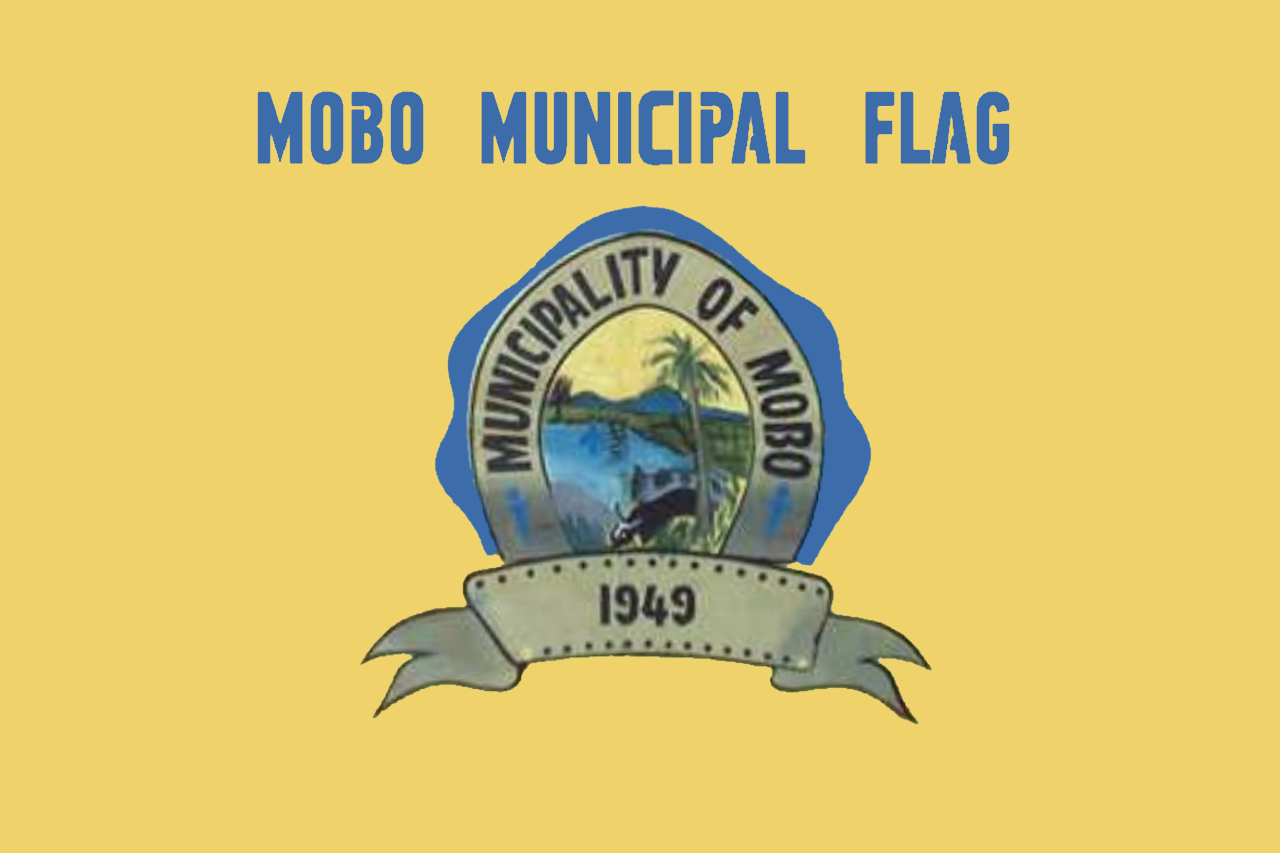
- Flag

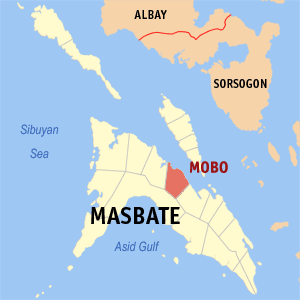
- Map of Masbate with Mobo highlighted
- Interactive map of Mobo
- Location within the Philippines
- Coordinates: 12°20′14″N 123°39′29″E
- Country: Philippines
- Region: Bicol Region
- Province: Masbate
- District: 2nd district
- Barangays: 29 (see Barangays)

Government
  - Type: Sangguniang Bayan
  - Mayor: Raymund Osmundo N. Salvacion
  - Vice Mayor: John Paul J. Lim
  - Representative: Ara Kho
  - Municipal Council: Members: Ely L. Bustamante Jr.; Nicolas Q. Bolon; Aldous Pitos; Julius T. Aban; IC Salvacion; Mateo R. Masamoc Sr.; Dasing Castillo; Jhie Laurio
  - Electorate: 25,115 voters (2025)

Area
  - Total: 143.47 km^{2} (55.39 sq mi)
- Elevation: 54 m (177 ft)
- Highest elevation: 352 m (1,155 ft)
- Lowest elevation: 0 m (0 ft)

Population (2024 census)
  - Total: 41,199
  - Density: 287.16/km^{2} (743.74/sq mi)
  - Households: 8,691

Economy
  - Income class: 2nd municipal income class
  - Poverty incidence: 19.01% (2023)
  - Revenue: ₱ 199.4 million (2024)
  - Assets: ₱ 526.2 million (2024)
  - Expenditure: ₱ 161.2 million (2024)
  - Liabilities: ₱ 111.2 million (2024)

Service provider
  - Electricity: Masbate Electric Cooperative (MASELCO)
- Time zone: UTC+8 (PST)
- ZIP code: 5401
- PSGC: 0504113000
- IDD : area code: +63 (0)56
- Native languages: Masbateño; Tagalog
- Website: mobo.gov.ph

Mobo, officially the Municipality of Mobo, is a municipality in the province of Masbate, Philippines. According to the 2024 census, it has a population of 41,199 people.

== History ==
Mobo was created as a municipality through Executive Order No. 244 signed by President Elpidio Quirino on July 18, 1949.

== Geography ==
Mobo is 6 kilometres (3.7 mi) from Masbate City.

=== Barangays ===
Mobo is politically subdivided into 29 barangays. Each barangay consists of puroks and some have sitios.

- Baang
- Bagacay
- Balatucan
- Barag
- Dacu
- Fabrica
- Guintorelan
- Holjogon
- Lalaguna
- Lomocloc
- Luyong Catungan
- Mabuhay
- Mandali
- Mapuyo
- Marintoc
- Nasunduan
- Pinamalatican
- Pinamarbuhan
- Poblacion Dist. I
- Poblacion Dist. II
- Polot
- Sambulawan
- Santa Maria
- Sawmill
- Tabuc
- Tugawe
- Tugbo
- Umabay Exterior
- Umabay Interior

=== Climate ===
Climate data for Mobo, Masbate
Month	Jan	Feb	Mar	Apr	May	Jun	Jul	Aug	Sep	Oct	Nov	Dec	Year
Mean daily maximum °C (°F)	28 (82)	29 (84)	30 (86)	32 (90)	32 (90)	31 (88)	30 (86)	30 (86)	30 (86)	29 (84)	29 (84)	29 (84)	30 (86)
Mean daily minimum °C (°F)	23 (73)	22 (72)	23 (73)	23 (73)	25 (77)	25 (77)	24 (75)	24 (75)	24 (75)	24 (75)	23 (73)	23 (73)	24 (74)
Average precipitation mm (inches)	39 (1.5)	34 (1.3)	42 (1.7)	36 (1.4)	73 (2.9)	109 (4.3)	118 (4.6)	108 (4.3)	129 (5.1)	136 (5.4)	112 (4.4)	89 (3.5)	1,025 (40.4)
Average rainy days	12.6	9.7	12.0	13.0	20.5	25.3	26.2	24.8	25.2	25.9	21.9	17.9	235
Source: Meteoblue

== Demographics ==
Population census of Mobo

Year	Pop.	±% p.a.
1903	2,657	—
1960	12,169	+2.71%
1970	20,622	+5.41%
1975	21,736	+1.06%
1980	22,609	+0.79%
1990	24,879	+0.96%
1995	25,049	+0.13%

Year	Pop.	±% p.a.
2000	28,233	+2.60%
2007	32,740	+2.06%
2010	34,896	+2.35%
2015	38,813	+2.05%
2020	40,823	+1.07%
2024	41,199	+0.22%

Source: Philippine Statistics Authority

In the 2024 census, the population of Mobo was 41,199 people, with a density of 290 inhabitants per square kilometre or 750 inhabitants per square mile.

== Economy ==
Poverty incidence of Mobo (%)

Source: Philippine Statistics Authority

== Education ==
There are two schools district offices which govern all educational institutions within the municipality. They oversee the management and operations of all private and public, from primary to secondary schools. These are the:

- Mobo North Schools District
- Mobo South Schools District

=== Primary and elementary schools ===
- Baang Elementary School
- Bagacay Elementary School
- Barag Elementary School
- Canahig Elementary School
- Carlito C. Bolon Elementary School
- Dacu Elementary School
- Daughters of Joseph Kindergarten School
- Fabian R. De Mesa Elementary School
- Guintorelan Elementary School
- Holjogon Elementary School
- Jose B. Gamora Elementary School
- Lalaguna Elementary School
- Lomocloc Elementary School
- Lucas C. Ramirez Elementary School
- Luciano A. Conde Elementary School
- Luyong Catungan Elementary School
- Mabuhay Elementary School
- Mapuyo Elementary School
- Mobo Central School
- Pinamarbuhan Elementary School
- Pinamalatican Elementary School
- Polot Elementary School
- Sambulawan Elementary School
- Sawmill Elementary School
- Sta. Maria Elementary School
- Tabuc Elementary School
- Umabay Exterior Central School
- Umabay Interior Elementary School

=== Secondary schools ===
- Cristeta Bagano Memorial High School
- Floro L. Medina Memorial High School
- Marintoc National High School
- Mobo National High School
- Tugbo Integrated School
