= Masbate =

Province in Bicol, Philippines

- Province
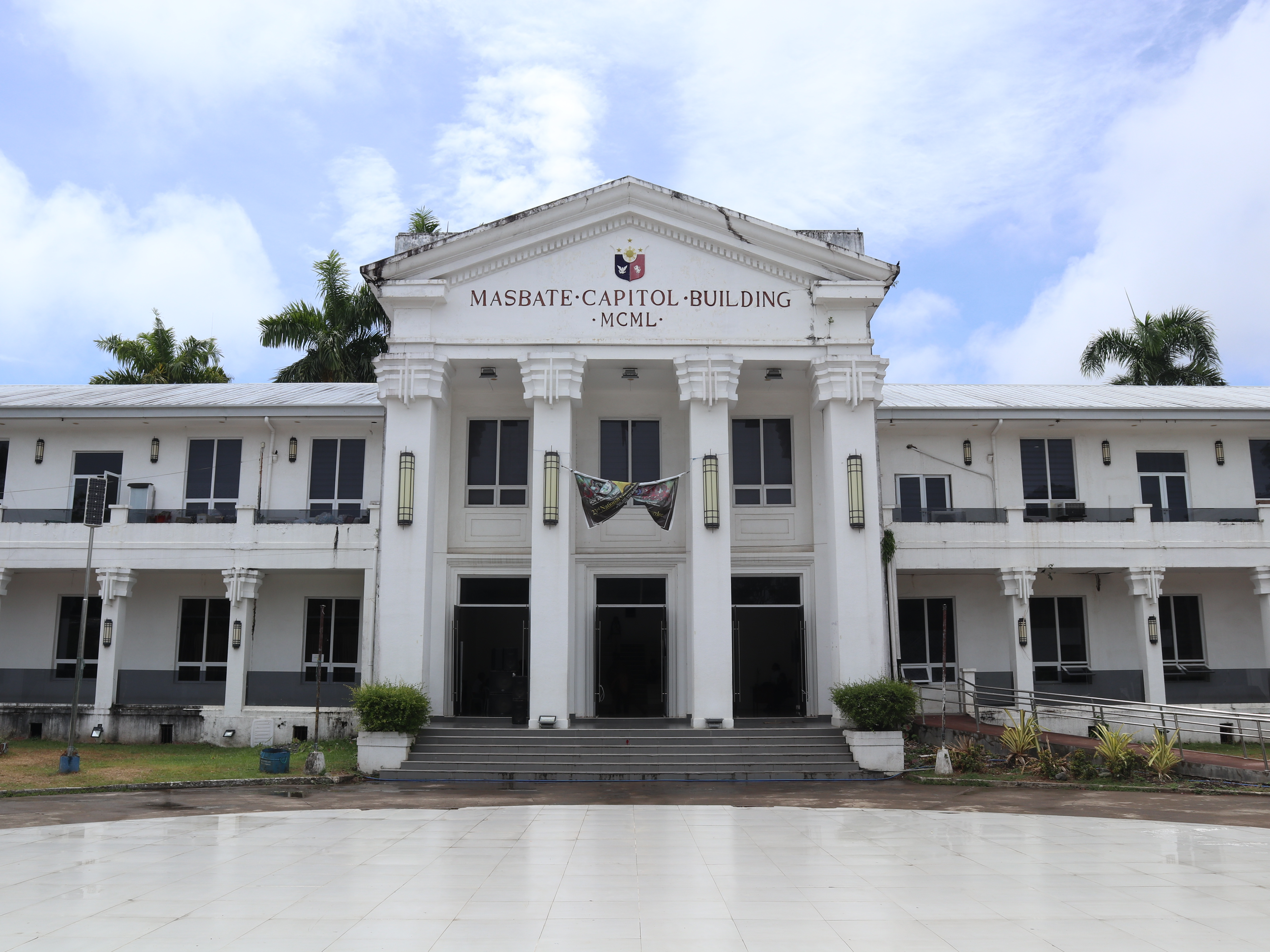
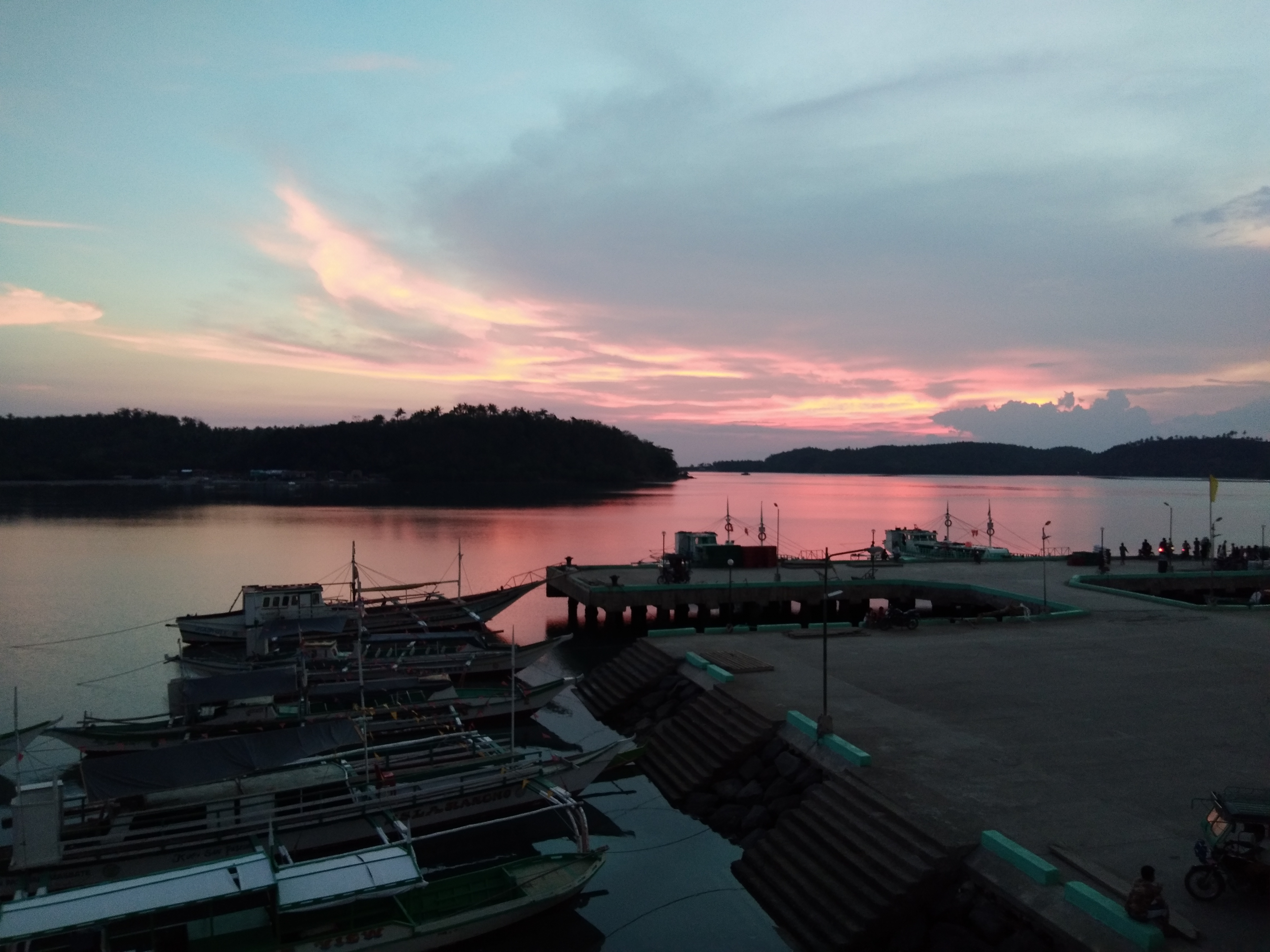
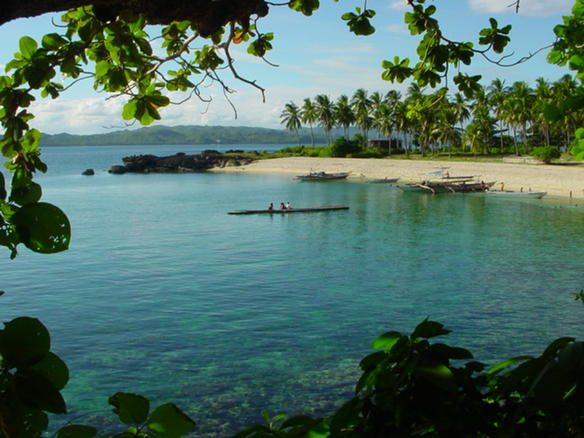
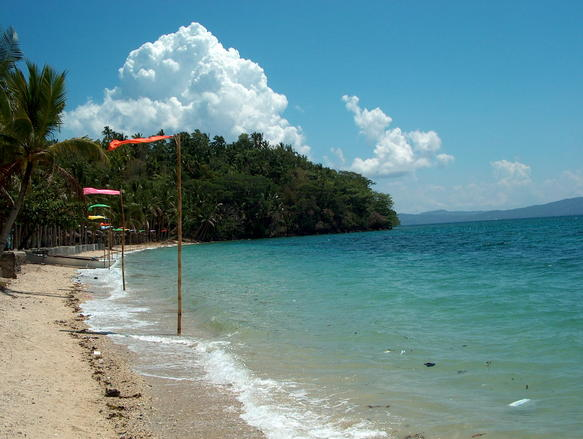
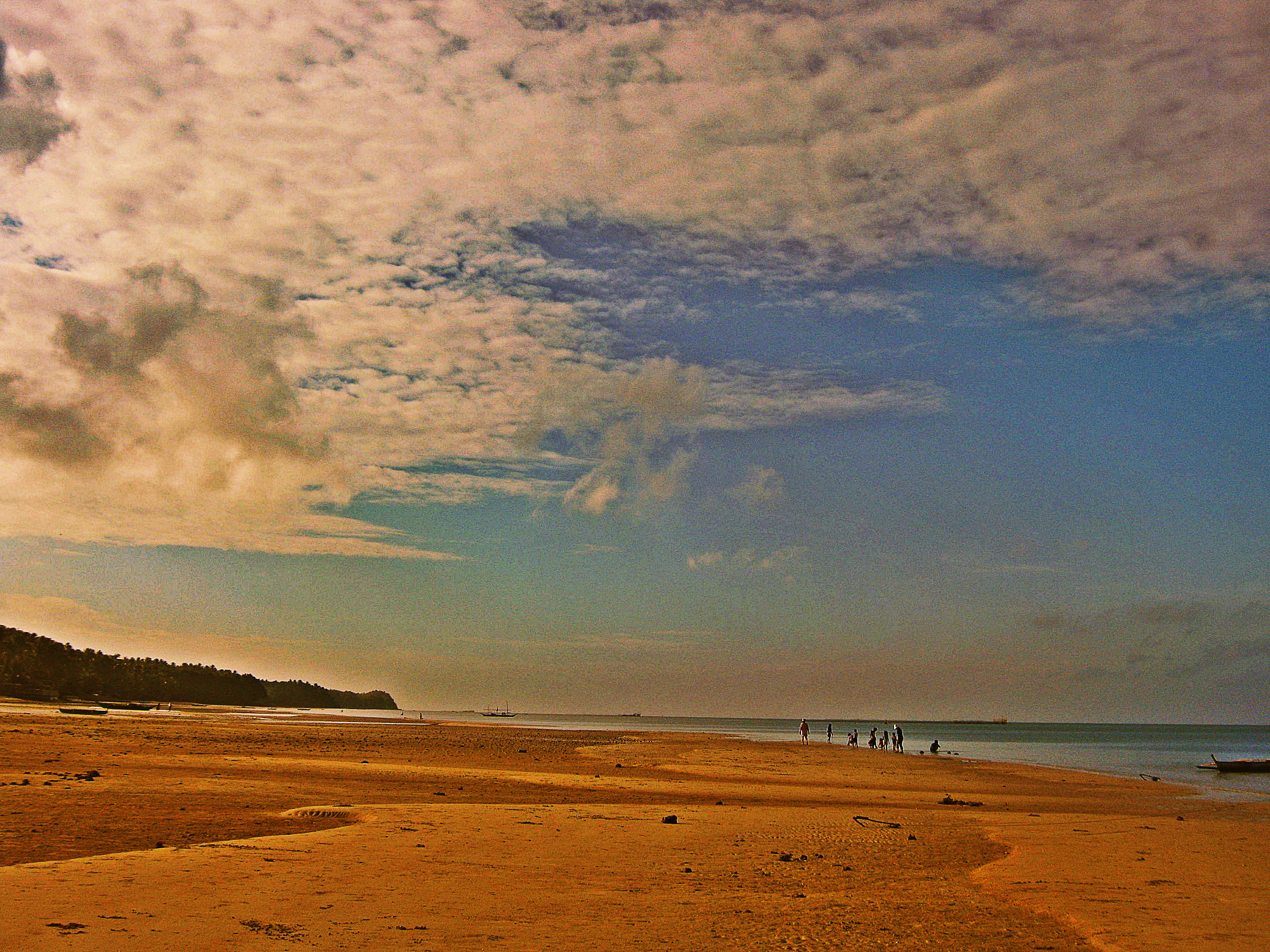
- (from top: left to right) Masbate Capitol Building, Port of Masbate, Balangingi Island in Pio V. Corpus, Bituon Beach in Mobo, and Gawas Beach in Esperanza

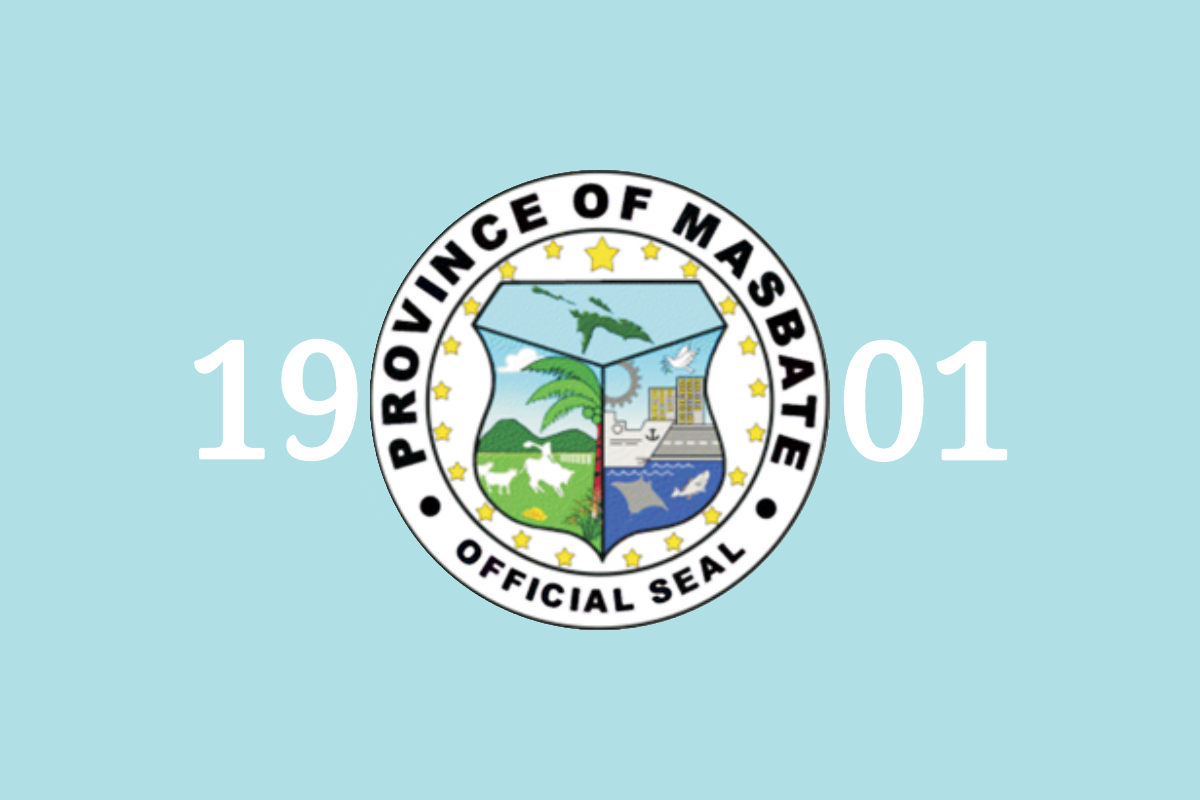
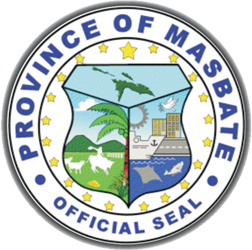
- Flag Seal

- Location within the Philippines
- Interactive map of Masbate
- Coordinates: 12°16′N 123°35′E
- Country: Philippines
- Region: Bicol Region
- Founded: March 18, 1901
- Capital and largest city: Masbate City

Government
  - Governor: Richard T. Kho (Lakas-CMD)
  - Vice Governor: Fernando P. Talisic (Lakas-CMD)
  - Legislature: Masbate Provincial Board
  - Electorate: 619,174 voters (2025)

Area
  - Total: 4,151.78 km^{2} (1,603.01 sq mi)
  - Rank: 30th out of 82
- Highest elevation (Conical Peak): 699 m (2,293 ft)

Population (2024 census)
  - Total: 910,813
  - Rank: 31st out of 82
  - Density: 219.379/km^{2} (568.189/sq mi)
  - Rank: 43rd out of 82
  - Households: 206,351
- Demonym: Masbateño

Divisions
  - Independent cities: 0
  - Component cities: 1: Masbate City
  - Municipalities: 20: Aroroy; Baleno; Balud; Batuan; Cataingan; Cawayan; Claveria; Dimasalang; Esperanza; Mandaon; Milagros; Mobo; Monreal; Palanas; Pio V. Corpus; Placer; San Fernando; San Jacinto; San Pascual; Uson
  - Barangays: 550
  - Districts: Legislative districts of Masbate

Economy
  - Income class: 1st provincial income class
  - Poverty incidence: 12.9% (2023)
  - Revenue: ₱ 2,499 million (2024)
  - Assets: ₱ 12,571 million (2024)
  - Expenditure: ₱ 1,866 million (2024)
  - Liabilities: ₱ 5,362 million (2024)
- Time zone: UTC+8 (PST)
- PSGC: 054100000
- IDD : area code: +63 (0)56
- ISO 3166 code: PH-MAS
- Spoken languages: Masbateño; Waray; Hiligaynon; Bikol; Cebuano; Filipino (Tagalog); English
- Website: masbate.gov.ph

Masbate, officially the Province of Masbate (Masbateño: Probinsya san Masbate; Tagalog: Lalawigan ng Masbate), is an island province in the Philippines located near the midsection of the nation's archipelago. Its provincial capital is Masbate City, the most populous in the province. The province consists of three major islands: Masbate, Ticao and Burias.

Masbate is at the crossroads of two island groups: Visayas and Luzon. It is politically part of Bicol Region in the latter. However, from a bio-geographic and socio-ethno-linguistic perspective, Masbate is grouped in the former.

== History ==
=== Early history ===
Masbate is one of the oldest settlements in the Philippines. Archaeological records show that Batungan (in Mandaon) and Bagumbayan (in Palanas) were major settlement sites during the Bronze Age (4000-1000 BC). The development of bronze metallurgy in Southeast Asia coincided with an increasingly hierarchical society, firmly based on agricultural village settlements. It was these crucial changes, the introduction of new technologies, new social forms, and a new economic base, which culminated in the foundation of the proto-urban settlements of the 1st millennium AD. A fine stone chisel from Mount Batungan is dated to the twelfth century BC. Of the age of Philippine neoliths, it is only possible to say that polished stone adzes from Masbate have been dated from 2710 BC to AD 179.2 Kalanay (in Aroroy) was an island site from 1000 BC to AD 850 (early metal). Masbateño burial jars and a small pottery skull box found in caves dated to the beginning of the Christian era. Exquisite gold work represents wealth in both an economic and an artistic sense: all sorts of wrought or moulded ornaments and jewellery demonstrate both the availability of the raw material and the skill of the artisan: finger rings, earrings, headbands, pendants, and pectoral ornaments, heavy chains with interlocking serrated edges, light filigree work, delicate necklaces of fine twisted wires, 12-millimeter beads composed of 184 separate granules soldered together, thin hammered sheets for decorating grosser objects like earplugs or the visages of corpses, and a charming little snail of unknown use. Productive mines in Benguet, Butuan, Masbate, and Paracale were in operation and gold being panned in riverbeds all over the archipelago when the Spaniards arrived in the 16th century.

=== Spanish colonial era ===
In the Spanish period, San Jacinto on Ticao Island was an anchorage point for the Manila-Acapulco-Manila galleons. The course as described by the standard pilot's guide of Cabrera Bueno was substantially followed by nearly all the galleons. The largest variations were in the height at which the eastward crossing was made and in the course laid off the coast of the Californias.

The successive stages were as follows: from Cavite on Manila Bay out through one of the bocas, generally between Mariveles and Corregidor; thence SSW, keeping well clear of Fortun to the left and high Ambil to the right; past Cape Santiago on the Luzon Coast, and E between Mindoro and Maricaban; by the Punta de Escarceo ("Tide Rip Point"), where currents run strong, and under Isla Verde, outside Subaang Bay, within which there was a fair anchorage in case of need; SE past the islets of Baco, with a good channel off Calapan; SE by E down the Mindoro coast by Punta Gorda de Pola; E by SE between the Tres Reyes and the Dos Hermanas; thence by the wide boca between Marinduque and Banton, out onto the tablazo, or open water, above Sibuyan; SE by E between Burias and Masbate; turning ENE around the Punta de San Miguel and the Punta del Diablo; coasting around the east side of Ticao to the anchorage at San Jacinto; clearing from thence and working out seaward with the monsoon; E right leagues, with the dangerous Naranjo Pass to starboard and Calantas Rock to port; NE by N and then ENE seven leagues around Capul; NE with the Sorsogon coast to port and San Bernardino to starboard and NE by E seven leagues to the Embocadero, with San Bernardino now to port and the island of Biri to starboard. At this point, according to Cabrera, “the rapid currents require skillful pilot work.” The galleon was now in the open sea.

From the chronicles of the early years of Spanish colonization, a relación (report) about Masbate first appeared in Fray Martín de Rada's letter dated July 1569 to the Viceroy of New Spain (now Mexico). He mentioned that in a place called Masbat there were plenty of gold mines. Other later documents such as Diego de Artieda Chirino’s Relación (1573) and Andrés de Mirandaola's letter (1574) refer to a place called Masbat or Masbad. It wasn't until 1582 that Miguel de Loarca wrote about a place called Masbate. Governor-General Miguel López de Legaspi founded encomiendas on the island and gave these to six of his soldiers garrisoned there, and these men formed families.

In the same year de Rada wrote of Masbat's gold mines, another Augustinian, Fray Alonzo Jiménez, landed in Burias and baptized its chieftain Buaya, thought to be the very first christening in Luzon. Fray Jiménez also built a church on Burias before he sailed on to Ibalon in 1570. By 1575, Masbate had become a priority in the Augustinian Missionary Memoranda. Fray Francisco de Ortega reported on the pillaging activities of a pirate named Caxabic in the islands of Masbate and Burias. By 1600, the Spaniards had developed Mobo as a galleon shipyard and San Jacinto as a strategic port. In 1605, Masbate was officially an Augustinian Mission and it is first prior was Fray Francisco Guerrero. Masbate had about 250 tributes and 1000 Christian natives. In 1609, Fray Pedro de Arce, bishop-elect of Nueva Cáceres, ceded spiritual administration of Masbate to the Mitra (secular clergy). On May 28, 1682, bishop-elect Dominican Fray Andrés Gonzáles petitioned King Charles II of Spain to revert some curacies of Nueva Cáceres to the charge of religious communities. The petition was approved in 1685 and by 1687, the first Augustinian Recollect missionaries had sailed for the port of San Jacinto to begin the Recollect Mission in Masbate. In 1700, Fray Ildefonso de la Concepción established the settlement of Uson as a visita of Mobo. The town of Masbate was established in 1791 by Fray Manuel de la Virgen del Tremedal.

The jurisdiction of Nueva Cáceres embraced the entire provinces of Camarines and Albay, as far as and including the islands of Ticao, Masbate, Burias, and Catanduanes; the province of Tayabas, as far as and including Lucban; and in the opposite coast of Maobàn, to Binangonan, Polo, Baler, and Casiguran. At one time, it was governed by The Most Illustrious Lordship Doctor Don Ysidoro de Arévalo, who was bishop-elect. Records show he enjoyed a yearly stipend of 4,000 pesos in common gold, in conformance with a royal decree. Likewise, a payment was made from the royal treasury, in virtue of a decree by the supreme government and the council of the royal treasury dated October 2, 1723, 200 pesos, for priests of the choir, at 100 pesos each, as assistants of the aforesaid illustrious lord. Another payment was made of 400 pesos, assigned to this church by the royal decree, dated at San Yldefonso on August 19, 1736; for the pay of singers, sacristans, and doorkeepers, and other expenses for worship and for the [care of the] building of the church. It likewise had a contribution of 232 pesos, 4 tomins, which was paid in 6 quintals of wax, 100 gantas of coconut-oil, and 4 arrobas of Castilian wine, in conformity with another royal decree dated February 21, 1705.

The administration of Masbate was given back to the Mitra after the Recollects left Masbate in 1794. All in all, over 60 Recollect missionaries were assigned to Masbate for a period of over 100 years. Masbate became a separate comandancia político-militar in 1846. In 1864, it was declared a separate province from Albay. After a devastating typhoon in 1908, Masbate was annexed to the province of Sorsogon. It finally gained status as a separate province on December 15, 1920, by virtue of Commonwealth Act No. 2934. In Rafael Bernal's book: México En Filipinas, Masbate was listed among other places which include Cavite and Pampanga, as areas where there were large concentrations of Mexican immigrants to the Philippines.

=== 20th century ===
During World War II, the Japanese invaded the Philippines and turned Masbate into a hub for sexual slavery which they called "the military club". A "comfort station" was built by the Japanese in the province, where young girls and teenagers were forced to become "comfort women", and routinely gang-raped, brutalized, humiliated, and murdered by Japanese soldiers for entertainment. The Japanese occupation was resisted by local Masbateño guerrillas under Captain Manuel Donato up until April 1945 during the Allied liberation by which the guerrillas controlled much of the province.

== Geography ==
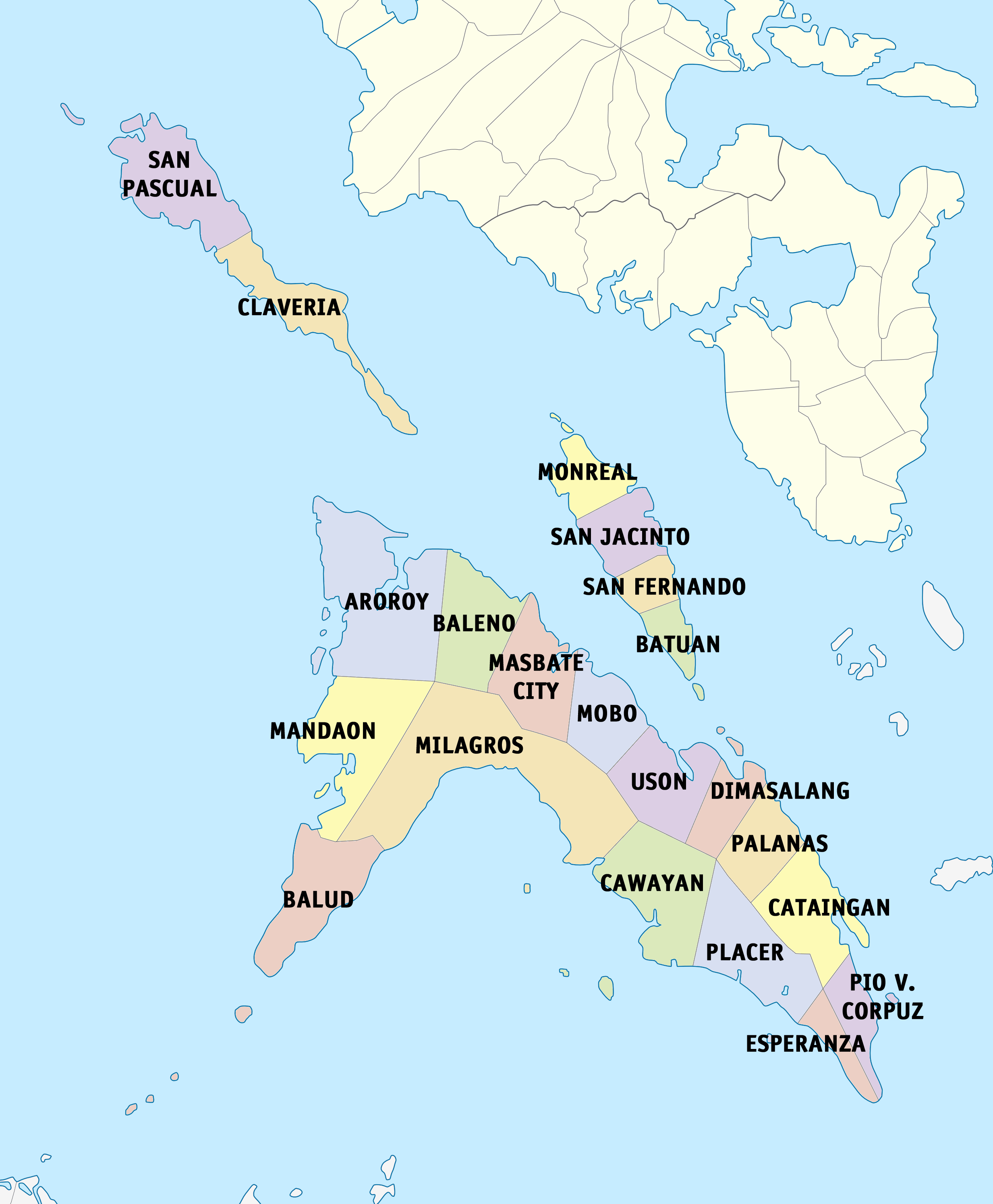
Political map of Masbate

The province lies roughly at the center of the Philippine archipelago, between latitudes 11°43′ north and 123°09′ east and 124°5′ east. It is bounded on the north by Burias and Ticao Pass, east by San Bernardino Strait, south by the Visayan Sea, and west by the Sibuyan Sea. Relative to mainland Bicol, the province faces the southwestern coasts of Camarines Sur, Albay, and Sorsogon areas. Masbate covers a total area of 4,151.78 square kilometres (1,603.01 sq mi).

The general surface configuration of the province ranges from slightly undulating to rolling and from hilly to mountainous. In each island, the rugged topography is concentrated in the northeastern portion and gradually recedes to blunt hills and rolling areas in the south, southeast, and southwest.

=== Administrative divisions ===
Masbate comprises 20 municipalities and one city, all encompassed by 3 congressional districts.

- † Provincial capital and component city
- Municipality

City or municipality		District	Population			±% p.a.	Area		Density		Barangay	Coordinates^{[A]}
			(2020)		(2015)		km^{2}	sq mi	/km^{2}	/sq mi		
Aroroy		2nd	9.7%	88,351	86,168	+0.48%	440.30	170.00	200	520	41	12°30′42″N 123°23′51″E
Baleno		2nd	3.2%	28,855	26,096	+1.93%	204.38	78.91	140	360	24	12°28′26″N 123°29′51″E
Balud		2nd	4.4%	40,155	38,124	+0.99%	231.00	89.19	170	440	32	12°02′15″N 123°11′35″E
Batuan		1st	1.6%	14,610	15,086	−0.61%	56.28	21.73	260	670	14	12°25′16″N 123°46′53″E
Cataingan		3rd	5.6%	50,623	50,327	+0.11%	191.64	73.99	260	670	36	12°00′01″N 123°59′48″E
Cawayan		3rd	7.6%	69,265	67,033	+0.63%	260.19	100.46	270	700	37	11°55′42″N 123°46′08″E
Claveria		1st	4.6%	42,142	43,693	−0.69%	182.98	70.65	230	600	22	12°54′10″N 123°14′45″E
Dimasalang		3rd	2.7%	24,909	26,192	−0.95%	148.07	57.17	170	440	20	12°11′32″N 123°51′32″E
Esperanza		3rd	1.9%	17,534	18,568	−1.09%	67.49	26.06	260	670	20	11°44′11″N 124°02′31″E
Mandaon		2nd	4.9%	44,122	41,262	+1.28%	319.15	123.22	140	360	26	12°13′34″N 123°17′03″E
Masbate City	†	2nd	11.5%	104,522	95,389	+1.76%	188.00	72.59	560	1,500	30	12°22′08″N 123°37′14″E
Milagros		2nd	6.3%	57,538	57,473	+0.02%	565.30	218.26	100	260	27	12°13′06″N 123°30′30″E
Mobo		2nd	4.5%	40,823	38,813	+0.97%	143.47	55.39	280	730	29	12°20′18″N 123°39′32″E
Monreal		1st	2.8%	25,164	26,614	−1.06%	128.67	49.68	200	520	11	12°38′35″N 123°39′49″E
Palanas		3rd	3.0%	27,322	26,222	+0.79%	119.53	46.15	230	600	24	12°08′45″N 123°55′18″E
Pio V. Corpus		3rd	2.6%	23,744	23,236	+0.41%	89.33	34.49	270	700	18	11°53′01″N 124°02′59″E
Placer		3rd	6.2%	56,340	55,826	+0.17%	193.03	74.53	290	750	35	11°52′05″N 123°54′43″E
San Fernando		1st	2.4%	21,600	23,057	−1.24%	77.50	29.92	280	730	26	12°29′01″N 123°45′45″E
San Jacinto		1st	3.3%	29,686	30,372	−0.43%	122.40	47.26	240	620	21	12°34′01″N 123°43′54″E
San Pascual		1st	4.9%	44,449	46,674	−0.93%	246.65	95.23	180	470	22	13°07′36″N 122°58′56″E
Uson		3rd	6.3%	57,166	56,168	+0.34%	163.20	63.01	350	910	35	12°13′31″N 123°47′00″E
Total				908,920	892,393	+0.35%	4,138.56	1,597.91	220	570	550	(see GeoGroup box)
1. Coordinates mark the city/town center, and are sortable by latitude.

== Demographics ==
Population census of Masbate

Year	Pop.	±% p.a.
1903	43,675	—
1918	67,513	+2.95%
1939	182,483	+4.85%
1948	211,113	+1.63%
1960	335,971	+3.95%
1970	492,908	+3.90%
1975	533,387	+1.60%
1980	584,520	+1.85%

Year	Pop.	±% p.a.
1990	599,355	+0.25%
1995	653,852	+1.64%
2000	707,668	+1.71%
2007	768,939	+1.15%
2010	834,650	+3.03%
2015	892,393	+1.28%
2020	908,920	+0.39%
2024	910,813	+0.05%

Source: Philippine Statistics Authority

The population of Masbate in the 2024 census was 910,813 people, with a density of 220 inhabitants per square kilometre or 570 inhabitants per square mile.

=== Language ===
Languages Spoken (2000)
Language	Speakers in '000
Masbateño	500
Hiligaynon	328
Cebuano	68
Waray	26

There are four Visayan languages and one from Luzon, spoken in the province.

Masbateño or Minasbaté is a Visayan language unique to the province. It has 75-83% mutual intelligibility with Hiligaynon, another Visayan language spoken in the southwestern tip of Masbate island. Cebuano is another Visayan language spoken in the southeastern municipalities in the island. Waray is spoken in the islands of Ticao Island due to their proximity to mainland Northern Samar, especially to the southern portion parts of the Province of Sorsogon where Waray Sorsogon is spoken.

Minasbaté is spoken in Masbate City and its neighboring municipalities. 33% of the population speaks Hiligaynon and it is spoken mainly in the towns of Balud, Mandaon and the southwestern part of Milagros, while the remaining 9% speak Cebuano, mainly in the southern towns of Esperanza, Pio V. Corpus and Placer. In northeastern Burias Island they speak Bicolano, while in Ticao Island they speak Waray similarly as the people of Gubat, due to the island's proximity to the Northern Samar mainland.

The people generally speak English and Tagalog, though these languages are rarely used in everyday discourse. The people only use them when conversing with tourists and visitors from other Philippine regions and foreign nationals.

=== Religion ===
Prior to colonization, the region had a complex religious system which involved various deities. Among these deities include: Gugurang, the supreme god who dwells inside of Mount Mayon where he guards and protects the sacred fire in which Aswang, his brother was trying to steal. Whenever people disobey his orders, wishes and commit numerous sins, he would cause Mount Mayon to burst lava as a sign of warning for people to mend their crooked ways. Ancient Bikolanos had a rite performed for him called Atang.; Asuang, the evil god who always tries to steal the sacred fire of Mount Mayon from his brother, Gugurang. Addressed sometimes as Aswang, he dwells mainly inside Mount Malinao. As an evil god, he would cause the people to suffer misfortunes and commit sins. Enemy of Gugurang and a friend of Bulan the god of the Moon; Haliya, the masked goddess of the moonlight and the arch-enemy of Bakunawa and protector of Bulan. Her cult is composed primarily of women. There is also a ritual dance named after her as it is performed to be a counter-measure against Bakunawa.; Bulan, the god of the pale moon, he is depicted as a pubescent boy with uncommon comeliness that made savage beast and the vicious mermaids (Magindara) tame. He has deep affection towards Magindang, but plays with him by running away so that Magindang would never catch him. The reason for this is because he is shy to the man that he loves. If Magindang manages to catch Bulan, Haliya always comes to free him from Magindang's grip; Magindang, the god of the sea and all its creatures. He has deep affection to the lunar god Bulan and pursues him despite never catching him. Due to this, the Bicolanos reasoned that it is to why the waves rise to reach the Moon when seen from the distant horizon. Whenever he does catch up to Bulan, Haliya comes to rescue Bulan and free him immediately; Okot, god of forest and hunting; and Bakunawa, a gigantic sea serpent deity who is often considered as the cause of eclipses, the devourer of the Sun and the Moon, and an adversary of Haliya as Bakunawa's main aim is to swallow Bulan, who Haliya swore to protect for all of eternity.

==== Catholicism ====
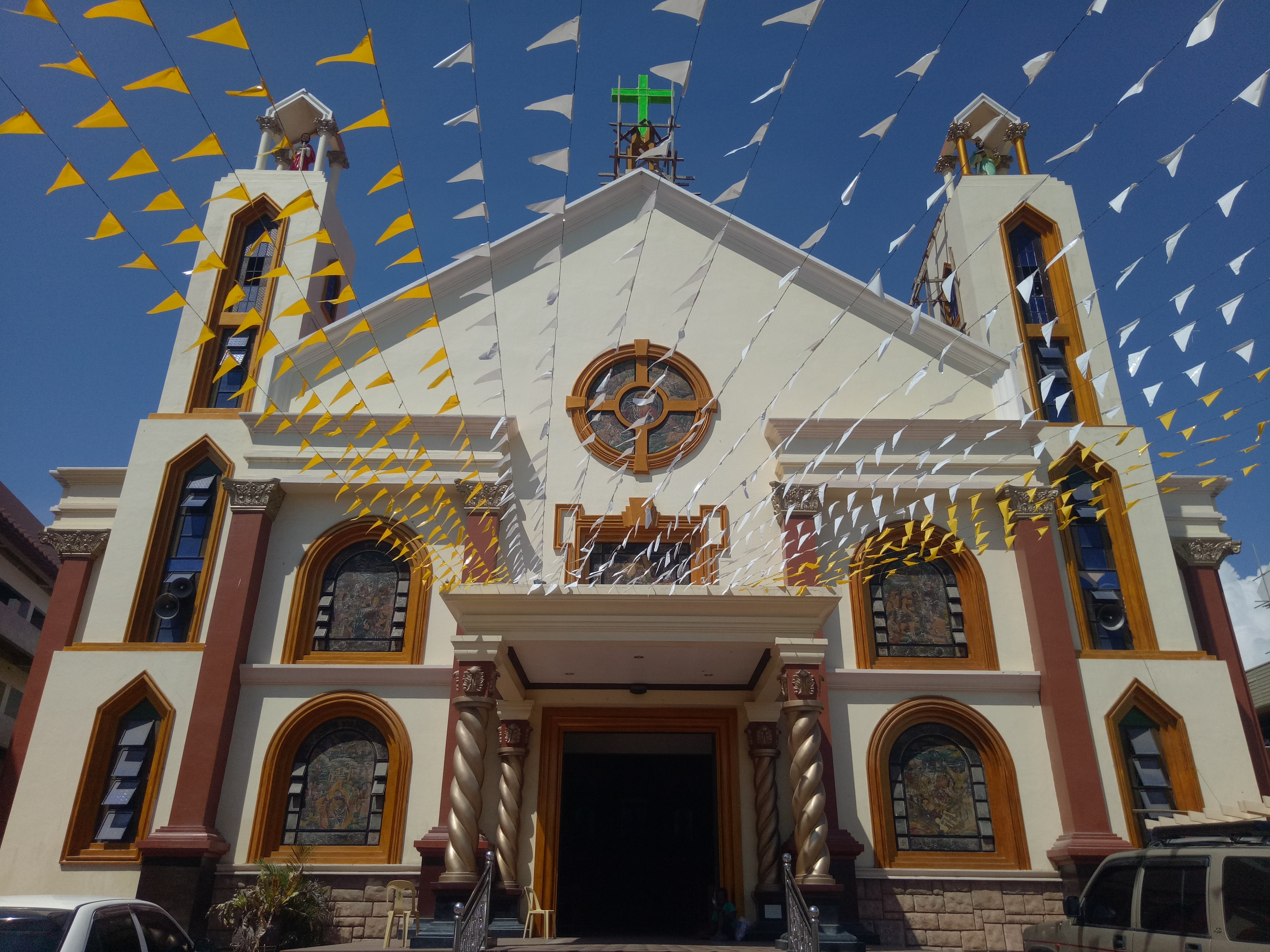
Cathedral of Saint Anthony of Padua

About 91% of the population are members of the Catholic Church (Statistics by Diocese Hierarchy, 2014). Devotional practices such as the rosary, novenas to saints, and other religious manifestations as processions, the Misa de Gallo and Holy Week traditional activities are still very much part of the way of life of most parishioners. The Diocese of Masbate was created on March 23, 1968, separating it from the Diocese of Sorsogon. It comprises then, and now, the civil province of Masbate with its 121 islands, including the two larger ones Burias and Ticao. It is now a suffragan of the Archdiocese of Caceres. Its titular patron is St. Anthony of Padua.

There are a total 22 parishes in the Diocese of Masbate, ministered to by 43 priests and 11 religious sisters. It has 1 minor seminary, 4 pastoral centers, 3 elementary schools, 6 high schools, 1 college and 7 kindergarten schools. And among its faith communities are 20 BEC's 46 neo-catechumenal communities, 11 mandated organizations and 3 charismatic groups.

==== Others ====
Other denominations include the Aglipayan Church, the Members Church of God International, popularly called Ang Dating Daan, Jesus Miracle Crusade, Iglesia ni Cristo (Church of Christ) which also functions many religious and social events in the province, as well as Baptist, Methodist, The Church of Jesus Christ of Latter-day Saints (Mormons), Jehovah's Witnesses, Seventh-day Adventist and other Christians. Non Christians are also present which is commonly represented by Muslims.

== Economy ==
Poverty incidence of Masbate (%)

Source: Philippine Statistics Authority

Masbate is endowed with rich natural resources. In line with its agriculture are other industries such as large farming, livestock, and poultry raising. Along with its coastal areas, the fishing industry predominates. Agricultural lands are planted with rice, corn, root crops, and coconut.

Masbate ranks second to Bukidnon in raising cattle. About 70% of these are sold to Metro Manila and other provinces in Luzon and Visayas. Farming is the main source of livelihood. Copra is the leading product, followed by corn, rice and root crops. Fishing is a major industry along the coast.

Manufacturing firms are in the copra industry, handicrafts, furniture making, and fish processing.

Rich minerals are found in the province. Masbate is described by geologists as a province sitting on a "pot of gold". Other minerals found in the area are manganese, copper, silver, iron, chromite, limestone, guano, and carbon.

Cottage industries such as furniture and cabinet making, ceramics, garments, handicrafts, and metalcrafts, are likewise the source of livelihood.

=== Infrastructure ===
In an agricultural province, Masbate remains a net importer of consumer and industrial products. The supply of goods came from Metro Manila, Cebu, Panay, and Bicol Provinces. Construction materials, particularly cement, are sometimes sourced from as far as Iligan City in Mindanao. Moises R. Espinosa Airport (also known as Masbate Airport) is the province's main airport which provides daily direct flights to Cebu and Angeles City that are operated by Cebgo.

== Tourism ==
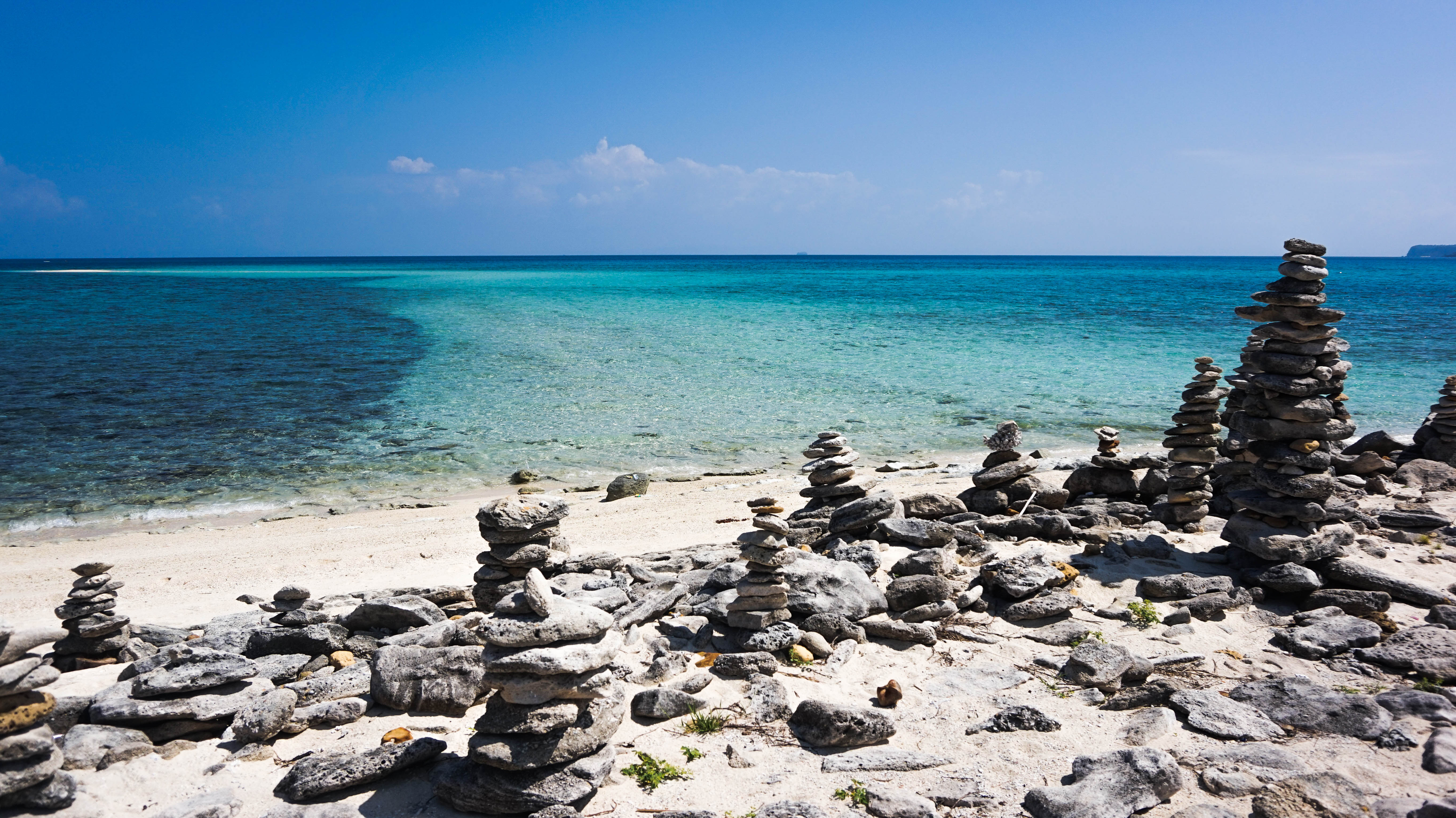
Animasola Beach in Masbate

Masbate has several islands and beaches open to tourists. The province also holds a rodeo festival every summer.

== Education ==
Major institutions of higher learning in the province include the state-supported Dr. Emilio B. Espinosa Sr. Memorial State College of Agriculture and Technology in Mandaon and in Masbate City, Osmeña Colleges, Masbate Colleges, Liceo de Masbate (a Catholic school with primary, secondary and tertiary educations under the directorship of the Diocese of Masbate), Southern Bicol College, Cataingan Municipal College. Masbate also has national schools in Aroroy, Cataingan, Placer, San Jacinto, Mandaon, Mobo, and Masbate City.

Other educational institutions include public and private schools such as the Masbate National Comprehensive High School in Masbate City that has two campuses: the Main Campus, which accommodates the Junior High School, and the Annex Campus which holds the Senior High School, Holy Name Academy (a Catholic institution run by the Augustinian Recollect Sisters in Palanas, Masbate) and Lucio Atabay Memorial Elementary School (formerly, Nipa Elem. School) in Nipa, Palanas, Masbate.

== Government ==
Current Provincial Government Officials (2025-2028)

- Governor: Richard T. Kho (Lakas-CMD)
- Vice-Governor: Fernando P. Talisic (Lakas-CMD)

Sangguniang Panlalawigan Members

1st District

- Alfredo L. Alim Jr. (Lakas-CMD)
- Sotero C. Cantela (Lakas-CMD)

2nd District

- Vicente Homer B. Revil (Lakas-CMD)
- Teddy L. Danao Jr. (Lakas-CMD)
- Kristoffer Paul A. Espinosa (Lakas-CMD)
- Allan B. Cos (PDP-Laban)

3rd District

- George A. Gonzales Jr. (Lakas-CMD)
- Nilda A. Tinegra (PDP-Laban)
- Ansbert S. Son (Lakas-CMD)

Ex-Officio Members

- TBD (President, Liga ng mga Barangay)
- TBD (President, PCL)
- TBD (President, Panlalawigang Pederasyon ng Sangguniang Kabataan)

=== House of Representatives ===
District	Representative	Party	Term	Bloc
1st	Antonio T. Kho	Lakas	1	Majority
2nd	Elisa "Olga" T. Kho	Lakas	1	Majority
3rd	Wilton "Tonton" T. Kho	Lakas	3	Majority

== Notable people ==
- Hannah Arnold – beauty queen, model, and television personality, Binibining Pilipinas International 2021
- Kisses Delavin – actress and singer
- Emilio R. Espinosa Jr. – politician, former governor and served as Secretary of the Department of Labor under President Ferdinand Marcos.
- Kristine Hermosa – actress
- Leonardo Quisumbing – lawyer, politician, served as former secretary of the Department of Labor and Employment and associate justice of the Supreme Court.
- Jesse Robredo – politician, former secretary of the Department of Interior and Local Government who died in a plane crash at Masbate islands
- Bea Santiago – beauty queen and television personality, Miss International 2013
- Johnoy Danao – singer
