= Dr. Emilio B. Espinosa Sr. Memorial State College of Agriculture and Technology =

Public college in Masbate, Philippines

- Kolehiyong Pampamahalaan sa Agrikultura na Pang-alaala kay Dr. Emilio B. Espinosa, Sr.
- Type: State college
- Established: November 15, 1952; 74 years ago
- President: Dr. Arnel B. Millesca, JD
- Location: Mandaon, Masbate, Philippines; 12°16′50″N 123°21′32″E
- Website: debesmscat.edu.ph
- Location in Luzon Location in the Philippines

The Dr. Emilio B. Espinosa Sr. Memorial State College of Agriculture and Technology (DEBESMSCAT; (Filipino: Kolehiyong Pampamahalaan sa Agrikultura na Pang-alaala kay Dr. Emilio B. Espinosa, Sr.) is the lone state college in the province of Masbate. Its main campus is located at Cabitan, Mandaon, Masbate, while its off campus learning site is located at Cawayan, Masbate.

== History ==
It was first called the Masbate National Agricultural School and was established on November 15, 1952, by virtue of Republic Act No. 605, authored by Dr. Emilio B. Espinosa Sr., then the lone congressman of the province of Masbate. MNAS was renamed Masbate Agricultural College on June 18, 1966, by virtue of Republic Act No. 4717, authored by then-congressman and con-con delegate, Hon. Andres R. Clemente Jr.

MAC was renamed the Dr. Emilio B. Espinosa Sr. Memorial Agricultural College on July 30, 1977, upon approval by Pres. Ferdinand E. Marcos of Resolution No. 136, series of 1976 enacted by the Sangguniang Panlalawigan of Masbate on December 8, 1976.

Republic Act No. 7945 approved March 3, 1995, authored by Masbate's Second Congressional District Representative Luz Cleta Reyes - Bakunawa and approved by President Fidel V. Ramos, converted the DEBESMAC into the Dr. Emilio B. Espinosa Sr. Memorial State College of Agriculture and Technology, with Dr. Percival V. Bartolata as its first president.

Pres. Bartolata was succeeded by Dr. Alfredo B. Atendido Sr., the acting president. On April 1, 2003, Dr. Magno S. Conag Jr. assumed his office as the second president. Under the leadership of Dr. Magno S. Conag Jr., the DEBESMSCAT continued to grow, particularly in the development of different curricular programs through accreditation.

After President Conag completed his two terms, Dr. Erwin H. Malto was elected by the Board of Trustees as the third president of DEBESMSCAT, granting him two terms from 2011 up to 2019. Under Dr. Malto's leadership, the state college became ISO-certified (ISO 9001:2008 - Quality Management System). A mock audit of the QMS consultant was conducted on October 27–28, 2015, and November 5–6, 2015. Internal audit followed on November 18–20, 2015. Stage 1 audit was conducted on February 11–12, 2016. On April 18–19, 2016, a Stage 2 audit was held. And on June 11, 2016, the most sought certification was given to the DEBESMSCAT by AJA (Anglo-Japanese-American) Registrars and the internal QMS auditor.

By virtue of Republic Act No. 11171, DEBESMSCAT was converted into Dr. Emilio B. Espinosa Sr. - Masbate State University (DEBESMSU).

On May 14, 2019, Dr. Renee A. Lamela, former vice president for Academic Affairs, was elected as the fourth SUC president and the first woman to have been elected in the office. Dr. Lamela's leadership seeks to capture the full compliance of the CHED requirements for the university status and initially implement RA 11171 otherwise known as DEBESMSU.

On May 13, 2023, the College welcomed its 5th SUC president in the person of Dr. Arnel B. Millesca.

== Facilities ==
The DEBESMSCAT's campus cover an area of 3,668 hectares (9,060 acres) in Mandaon, Masbate.

== Program accreditation ==
The curricular programs of the college are submitted for accreditation to the Accrediting Agency of Chartered Colleges and Universities in the Philippines (AACCUP), Inc. organized in 1987, though officially registered and recognized under the Securities and Exchange Commission (SEC) on September 4, 1989.
