= Masbate's 2nd congressional district =

Legislative district of the Philippines

- Constituency for the House of Representatives of the Philippines
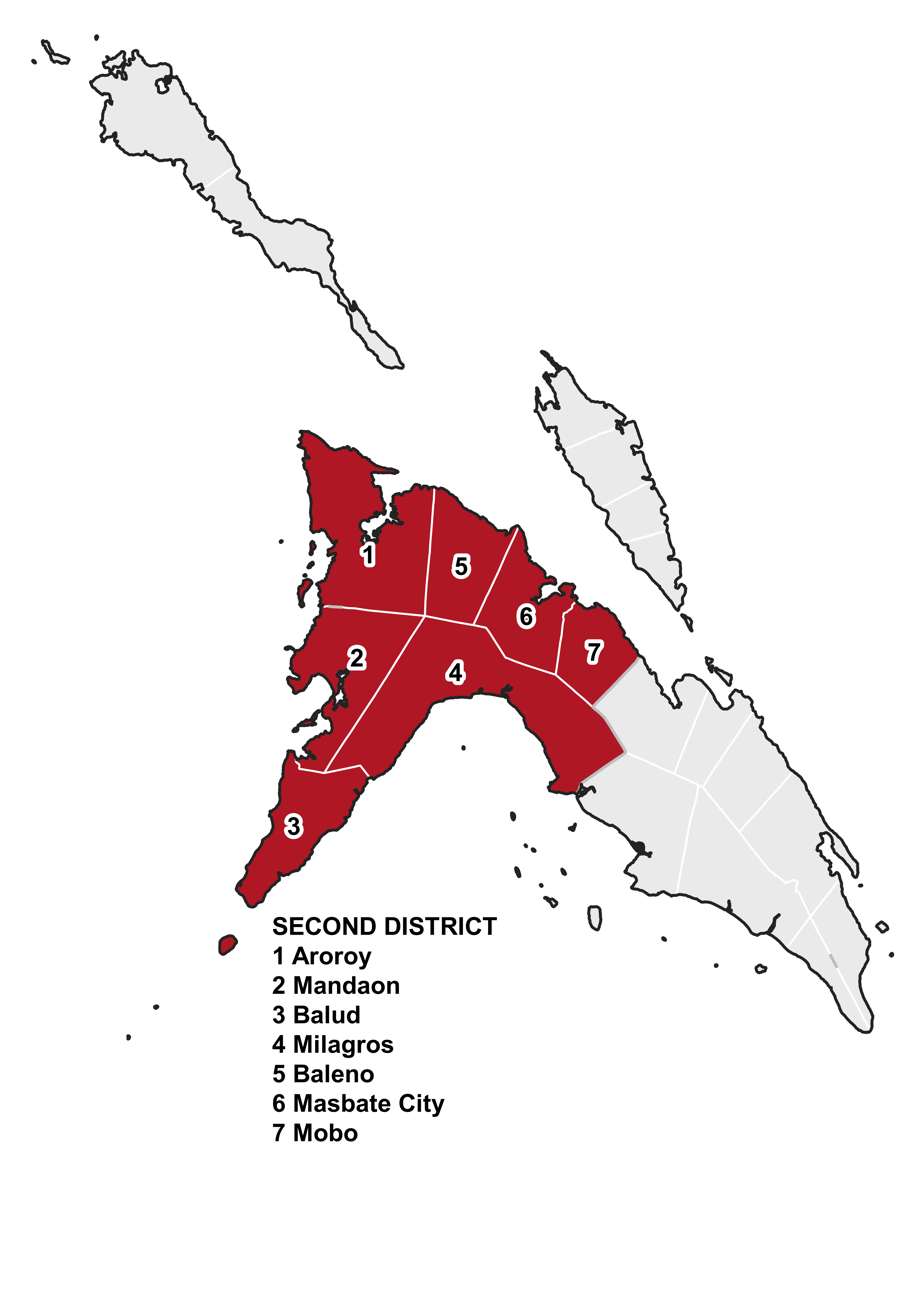

- Location of Masbate within the Philippines
- Province: Masbate
- Region: Bicol Region
- Population: 404,366 (2020)
- Electorate: 252,110 (2022)
- Major settlements: 7 LGUs: Cities; Masbate City; Municipalities; Aroroy; Baleno; Balud; Mandaon; Milagros; Mobo
- Area: 2,053.25 km^{2} (792.76 sq mi)

Current constituency
- Created: 1987
- Representative: Olga Kho
- Political party: Lakas–CMD
- Congressional bloc: Majority

Masbate's 2nd congressional district is one of the three congressional districts of the Philippines in the province of Masbate. It has been represented in the House of Representatives since 1987. The district encompasses the western half of Masbate Island consisting of the provincial capital Masbate City and the municipalities of Aroroy, Baleno, Balud, Mandaon, Milagros and Mobo. It is currently represented in the 20th Congress by Olga Kho of the Lakas–CMD.

== Representation history ==
#	Image	Member	Term of office		Congress	Party	Electoral history	Constituent LGUs
#	Image	Member	Start	End	Congress	Party	Electoral history	Constituent LGUs
=== Masbate's 2nd district for the House of Representatives of the Philippines ===
District created February 2, 1987.
1		Luz Cleta R. Bakunawa	June 30, 1987	February 28, 1998	8th	Independent	Elected in 1987.	1987–present Aroroy, Baleno, Balud, Mandaon, Masbate City, Milagros, Mobo
1		Luz Cleta R. Bakunawa	June 30, 1987	February 28, 1998	9th	LDP	Re-elected in 1992.	1987–present Aroroy, Baleno, Balud, Mandaon, Masbate City, Milagros, Mobo
1		Luz Cleta R. Bakunawa	June 30, 1987	February 28, 1998	10th	Nacionalista	Re-elected in 1995.	1987–present Aroroy, Baleno, Balud, Mandaon, Masbate City, Milagros, Mobo
2		Emilio Espinosa Jr.	June 30, 1998	June 30, 2007	11th	LAMMP	Elected in 1998.	1987–present Aroroy, Baleno, Balud, Mandaon, Masbate City, Milagros, Mobo
2		Emilio Espinosa Jr.	June 30, 1998	June 30, 2007	12th	NPC	Re-elected in 2001.	1987–present Aroroy, Baleno, Balud, Mandaon, Masbate City, Milagros, Mobo
2		Emilio Espinosa Jr.	June 30, 1998	June 30, 2007	13th	NPC	Re-elected in 2004.	1987–present Aroroy, Baleno, Balud, Mandaon, Masbate City, Milagros, Mobo
3		Antonio T. Kho	June 30, 2007	June 30, 2013	14th	Lakas	Elected in 2007.	1987–present Aroroy, Baleno, Balud, Mandaon, Masbate City, Milagros, Mobo
3		Antonio T. Kho	June 30, 2007	June 30, 2013	15th	Lakas–Kampi	Re-elected in 2010.	1987–present Aroroy, Baleno, Balud, Mandaon, Masbate City, Milagros, Mobo
4		Olga Kho	June 30, 2013	June 30, 2022	16th	Lakas	Elected in 2013.	1987–present Aroroy, Baleno, Balud, Mandaon, Masbate City, Milagros, Mobo
4		Olga Kho	June 30, 2013	June 30, 2022	17th	PDP–Laban	Re-elected in 2016.	1987–present Aroroy, Baleno, Balud, Mandaon, Masbate City, Milagros, Mobo
4		Olga Kho	June 30, 2013	June 30, 2022	18th	PDP–Laban	Re-elected in 2019.	1987–present Aroroy, Baleno, Balud, Mandaon, Masbate City, Milagros, Mobo
5		Ara Kho	June 30, 2022	June 30, 2025	19th	PDP–Laban	Elected in 2022.	1987–present Aroroy, Baleno, Balud, Mandaon, Masbate City, Milagros, Mobo
5		Ara Kho	June 30, 2022	June 30, 2025	19th	Lakas	Elected in 2022.	1987–present Aroroy, Baleno, Balud, Mandaon, Masbate City, Milagros, Mobo
(4)		Elisa Olga Kho	June 30, 2025	Present	20th	Lakas	Elected in 2025.	1987–present Aroroy, Baleno, Balud, Mandaon, Masbate City, Milagros, Mobo

== Election results ==
=== 2025 ===
Candidate	Party	Votes	%
Elisa Olga Kho	Lakas–CMD	141,264	71.78
Noel Tuason	Liberal Party	53,596	27.23
Sherman Valera	Independent	1,954	0.99
Total		196,814	100.00
Valid votes		196,814	90.06
Invalid/blank votes		21,713	9.94
Total votes		218,527	100.00
Registered voters/turnout		274,067	79.73
Lakas–CMD hold			
Source: Commission on Elections

=== 2022 ===
2022 Philippine House of Representatives elections
Party	Candidate	Votes	%
PDP–Laban	Olga "Ara" Kho	123,160	
NUP	Scott Davies Lanette	44,000	
Total votes			100.00
PDP–Laban hold			

=== 2016 ===
2016 Philippine House of Representatives elections
Party	Candidate	Votes	%
Nacionalista	Elisa Kho	61,182	
NUP	Vincente Homer Revil	48,487	
NPC	Darius Tuason	25,671	
Invalid or blank votes		35,142	
Total votes		170,482	
Nacionalista hold			

=== 2013 ===
2013 Philippine House of Representatives elections
Party	Candidate	Votes	%
Lakas	Elisa Olga Kho	60,592	40.51
NPC	Darius Tuason	42,363	28.32
Margin of victory		18,229	12.19%
Invalid or blank votes		46,619	31.17
Total votes		149,574	100.00
Lakas hold			

=== 2010 ===
Candidate	Party	Votes	%
Antonio Kho (incumbent)	Lakas–Kampi–CMD	68,300	58.61
Darius Tuason Sr.	Nationalist People's Coalition	48,232	41.39
Total		116,532	100.00
Valid votes		116,532	86.42
Invalid/blank votes		18,304	13.58
Total votes		134,836	100.00
Lakas–Kampi–CMD hold			
Source: Commission on Elections

=== 2007 ===
2007 Philippine House of Representatives elections
Party	Candidate	Votes	%
Lakas	Antonio Kho	48,364	
KAMPI	Ma. Lourdes Espinosa	34,685	
PDSP	Ricardo Celera	4,545	
PDP–Laban	Leo Manlapas	3,579	
Invalid or blank votes			
Total votes			
Lakas hold			

== See also ==
- Legislative districts of Masbate
