= Mandaon =

Municipality in Masbate, Philippines

- Municipality
- Municipality of Mandaon
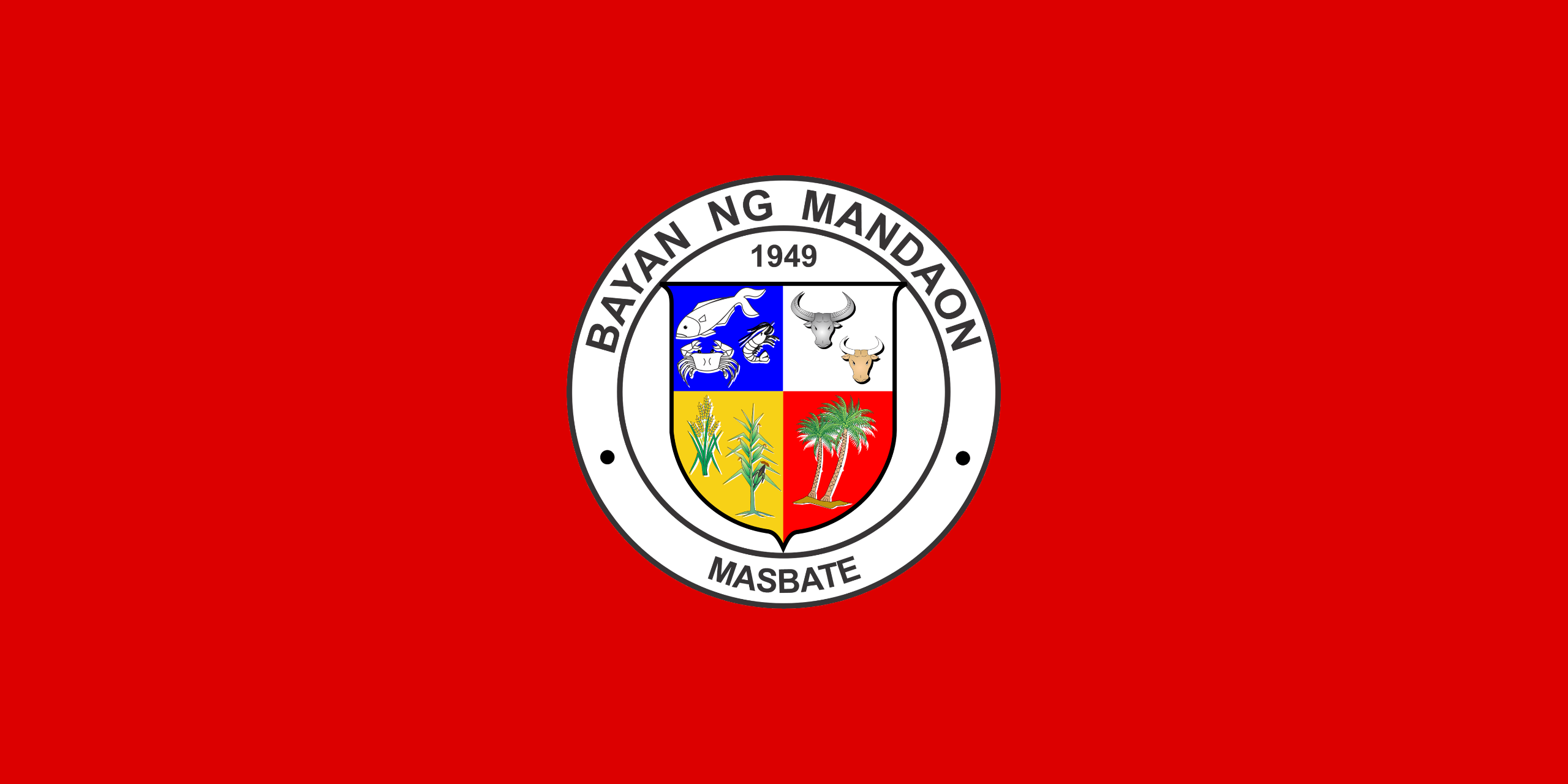
- Flag

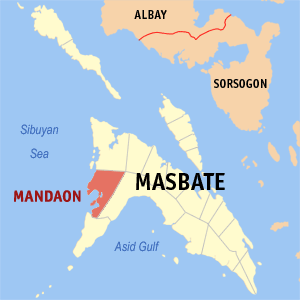
- Map of Masbate with Mandaon highlighted
- Interactive map of Mandaon
- Location within the Philippines
- Coordinates: 12°13′33″N 123°17′03″E
- Country: Philippines
- Region: Bicol Region
- Province: Masbate
- District: 2nd district
- Founded: 18 July 1949
- Barangays: 26 (see Barangays)

Government
  - Type: Sangguniang Bayan
  - Mayor: Emily E. Hao
  - Vice Mayor: Romeo R. Villanueva
  - Representative: Elisa T. Kho
  - Municipal Council: Members: Paul V. Santiago; Noel R. Coja; Olegario R. Estrella Jr.; Genaro B. Dote Jr.; Efren L. Oliva; Rommel B. Mortel; Mariecor S. Pimentel; Jovino D. Aguirre
  - Electorate: 28,127 voters (2025)

Area
  - Total: 280.80 km^{2} (108.42 sq mi)
- Elevation: 20 m (66 ft)
- Highest elevation: 181 m (594 ft)
- Lowest elevation: 0 m (0 ft)

Population (2024 census)
  - Total: 44,177
  - Density: 157.33/km^{2} (407.47/sq mi)
  - Households: 9,833

Economy
  - Income class: 1st municipal income class
  - Poverty incidence: 21.8% (2023)
  - Revenue: ₱ 228.1 million (2024)
  - Assets: ₱ 484.1 million (2024)
  - Expenditure: ₱ 189.9 million (2024)
  - Liabilities: ₱ 125.1 million (2024)

Service provider
  - Electricity: Masbate Electric Cooperative (MASELCO)
- Time zone: UTC+8 (PST)
- ZIP code: 5411
- PSGC: 0504110000
- IDD : area code: +63 (0)56
- Native languages: Capiznon; Tagalog

Mandaon, officially the Municipality of Mandaon (Capiznon: Banwa kang Mandaon; Masbatenyo: Banwa san Mandaon), is a municipality in the province of Masbate, Philippines. According to the 2024 census, it has a population of 44,177 people.

== History ==
Mandaon was originally a barrio of Milagros, established by Barrio Lieutenant Feliciano Aquillo Sr. In 1948, Juan Valencia, a settler from Pampanga, advocated for its elevation into a municipality. On July 18, 1949, President Elpidio Quirino, through Executive Order No. 244, officially recognized Mandaon as an independent municipality, distinct from Milagros.

== Geography ==
Mandaon is 64 kilometres (40 mi) from Masbate City.

=== Barangays ===
Mandaon is politically subdivided into 26 barangays. Each barangay consists of puroks and some have sitios.

- Alas
- Ayat
- Bat-Ongan
- Bugtong
- Buri
- Cabitan
- Cagmasoso
- Canomoy
- Centro
- Dayao
- Guincaiptan
- Laguinbanwa
- Lantangan
- Looc
- Mabatobato
- Maolingon
- Nailaban
- Nanipsan
- Pinamangcaan
- Poblacion
- Polo Dacu
- San Juan
- San Pablo
- Santa Fe
- Tagpu
- Tumalaytay

=== Climate ===
Climate data for Mandaon, Masbate
Month	Jan	Feb	Mar	Apr	May	Jun	Jul	Aug	Sep	Oct	Nov	Dec	Year
Mean daily maximum °C (°F)	29 (84)	29 (84)	31 (88)	32 (90)	32 (90)	31 (88)	30 (86)	30 (86)	30 (86)	30 (86)	29 (84)	29 (84)	30 (86)
Mean daily minimum °C (°F)	23 (73)	22 (72)	23 (73)	23 (73)	25 (77)	25 (77)	24 (75)	25 (77)	24 (75)	24 (75)	24 (75)	23 (73)	24 (75)
Average precipitation mm (inches)	39 (1.5)	34 (1.3)	42 (1.7)	36 (1.4)	73 (2.9)	109 (4.3)	118 (4.6)	108 (4.3)	129 (5.1)	136 (5.4)	112 (4.4)	89 (3.5)	1,025 (40.4)
Average rainy days	12.6	9.7	12.0	13.0	20.5	25.3	26.2	24.8	25.2	25.9	21.9	17.9	235
Source: Meteoblue

== Demographics ==
Population census of Mandaon

Year	Pop.	±% p.a.
1903	1,426	—
1960	13,277	+3.99%
1970	18,612	+3.43%
1975	22,161	+3.56%
1980	25,518	+2.86%
1990	25,670	+0.06%
1995	28,716	+2.12%

Year	Pop.	±% p.a.
2000	31,572	+2.05%
2007	34,401	+1.19%
2010	38,161	+3.85%
2015	41,262	+1.50%
2020	44,122	+1.42%
2024	44,177	+0.03%

Source: Philippine Statistics Authority

In the 2024 census, the population of Mandaon, Masbate, was 44,177 people, with a density of 160 inhabitants per square kilometre or 410 inhabitants per square mile.

== Economy ==
Poverty incidence of Mandaon (%)

Source: Philippine Statistics Authority

== Education ==
There are two schools district offices which govern all educational institutions within the municipality. They oversee the management and operations of all private and public, from primary to secondary schools. These are the:

- Mandaon North Schools District
- Mandaon South Schools District

The municipality is home to the 3,668-hectare campus of the only state college in the province of Masbate: the Dr. Emilio B. Espinosa Sr. Memorial State College of Agriculture and Technology (DEBESMSCAT), named after the former congressman of the province, Dr. Emilio B. Espinosa, Sr.

=== Primary and elementary schools ===
- Alas Elementary School
- Ayat Elementary School
- Bugtong Elementary School
- Buri Elementary School
- Cabitan Central School
- Cagmasoso Elementary School
- Canomoy Elementary School
- Centro Elementary School
- Dayao Elementary School
- Diogenes R. Cabarles Elementary School
- Guincaiptan Elementary School
- Holy Family Diocesan School
- Jose Zurbito Mesa S. Memorial Elementary School
- Lantangan Elementary School
- Mabato-bato Elementary School
- Mandaon Christian Academy
- Maolingon Elementary School
- Montano P. Estipona MES
- Nailaban Elementary School
- Nanipsan Elementary School
- Olegario O. Estrella Sr. Elementary School
- Pinamangcaan Elementary School
- Pulo Dacu Elementary School
- San Juan Elementary School
- San Pablo Elementary School
- Santa Fe Elementary School
- Tabuk Elementary School
- Tagpu Elementary School
- Tagpu High School
- Tunog SDA Multigrade School
- Yaneza Landed Estate Elementary School

=== Secondary schools ===
- Bugtong National High School
- Buri National High School
- Cabitan National High School
- Cleofe A. Arce Memorial High School
- Federico A. Estipona Memorial High School
- Lantangan High School
- San Pablo National High School
- Tumalaytay High School

=== Higher educational institution ===
- Dr. Emilio B. Espinosa Sr. Memorial State College of Agriculture and Technology
