= Balud =

Municipality in Masbate, Philippines

- Municipality
- Municipality of Balud
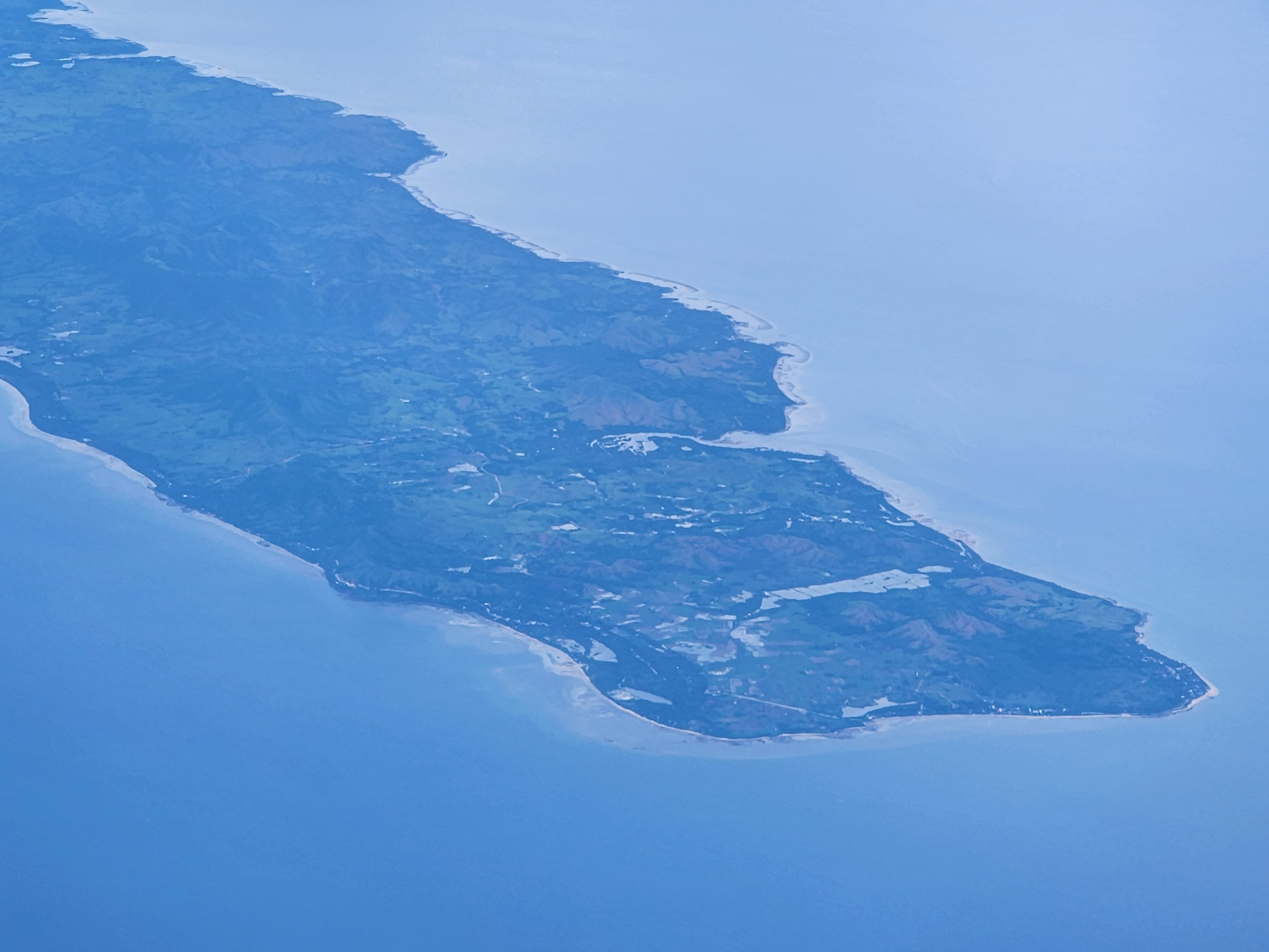
- Aerial view in 2024

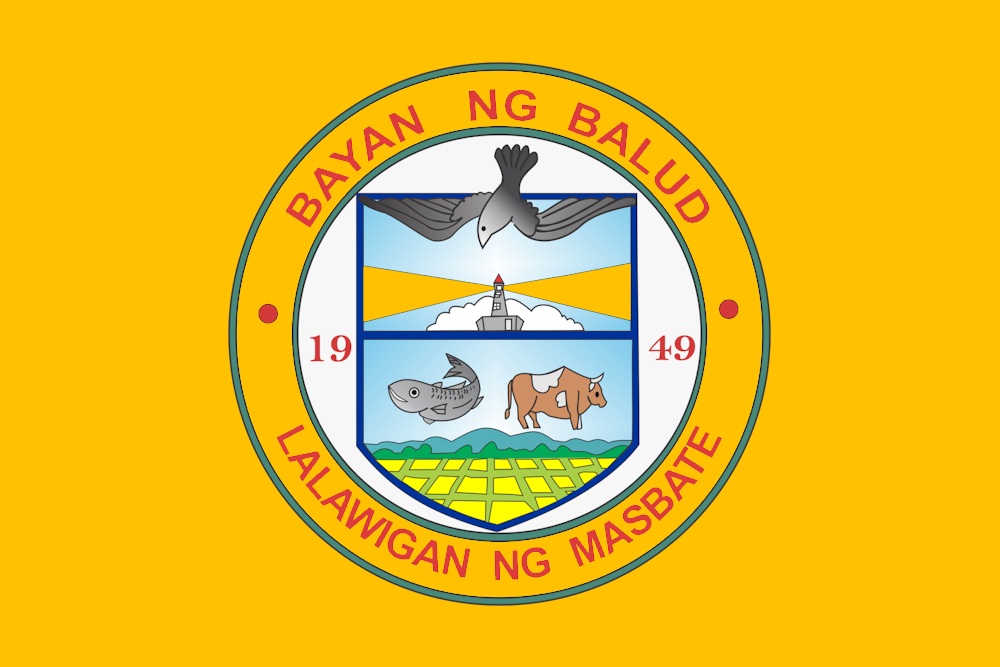
- Flag Seal

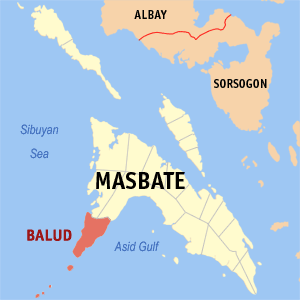
- Map of Masbate with Balud highlighted
- Interactive map of Balud
- Location within the Philippines
- Coordinates: 12°02′13″N 123°11′37″E
- Country: Philippines
- Region: Bicol Region
- Province: Masbate
- District: 2nd district
- Founded: July 18, 1949
- Barangays: 32 (see Barangays)

Government
  - Type: Sangguniang Bayan
  - Mayor: Rodolfo Estrella Jr.
  - Vice Mayor: Felimon C. Abelita III
  - Representative: Elisa T. Kho
  - Municipal Council: Members: Emmanuel T. Sese; Clemente P. Arguelles III; Julius P. Arguelles; Roque B. dela Cruz; Gina N. Alajar; Paulito P. Tacurda; Jinky J. Nuevo; Rey T. Sto. Domingo
  - Electorate: 28,285 voters (2025)

Area
  - Total: 231.00 km^{2} (89.19 sq mi)
- Elevation: 24 m (79 ft)
- Highest elevation: 356 m (1,168 ft)
- Lowest elevation: 0 m (0 ft)

Population (2024 census)
  - Total: 40,236
  - Density: 174.18/km^{2} (451.13/sq mi)
  - Households: 9,039

Economy
  - Income class: 2nd municipal income class
  - Poverty incidence: 22% (2023)
  - Revenue: ₱ 204.4 million (2024)
  - Assets: ₱ 574.5 million (2024)
  - Expenditure: ₱ 223.7 million (2024)
  - Liabilities: ₱ 224.1 million (2024)

Service provider
  - Electricity: Masbate Electric Cooperative (MASELCO)
- Time zone: UTC+8 (PST)
- ZIP code: 5412
- PSGC: 0504103000
- IDD : area code: +63 (0)56
- Native languages: Hiligaynon; Capiznon; Tagalog

Balud, officially the Municipality of Balud, is a municipality in the province of Masbate, Philippines. According to the 2024 census, it has a population of 40,236 people.

== Etymology ==
The name Balud came from the name of the Pink-bellied imperial pigeon (Ducula poliocephala).

== History ==
Balud was created as a municipality through Executive Order No. 244 signed by President Elpidio Quirino on July 18, 1949.

== Geography ==
Balud is 68 kilometres (42 mi) from Masbate City.

=== Barangays ===
Balud is politically subdivided into 32 barangays. Each barangay consists of puroks and some have sitios.

- Baybay (Lumocab)
- Bongcanaway
- Mabuhay (Bongcanaway III)
- Calumpang
- Cantil
- Casamongan
- Dao
- Danao
- Guinbanwahan
- Ilaya
- Jangan
- Jintotolo
- Mapili
- Mapitogo
- Pajo
- Palani
- Panguiranan
- Panubigan
- Poblacion (Balud)
- Pulanduta
- Quinayangan Diotay
- Quinayangan Tonga
- Salvacion
- Sampad
- San Andres (Quinayangan Dacu)
- San Antonio
- Sapatos
- Talisay
- Tonga
- Ubo
- Victory
- Villa Alvarez

=== Climate ===
Climate data for Balud, Masbate
Month	Jan	Feb	Mar	Apr	May	Jun	Jul	Aug	Sep	Oct	Nov	Dec	Year
Mean daily maximum °C (°F)	29 (84)	29 (84)	31 (88)	32 (90)	32 (90)	31 (88)	30 (86)	30 (86)	30 (86)	30 (86)	29 (84)	29 (84)	30 (86)
Mean daily minimum °C (°F)	23 (73)	22 (72)	23 (73)	23 (73)	25 (77)	25 (77)	24 (75)	25 (77)	24 (75)	24 (75)	24 (75)	23 (73)	24 (75)
Average precipitation mm (inches)	39 (1.5)	34 (1.3)	42 (1.7)	36 (1.4)	73 (2.9)	109 (4.3)	118 (4.6)	108 (4.3)	129 (5.1)	136 (5.4)	112 (4.4)	89 (3.5)	1,025 (40.4)
Average rainy days	12.6	9.7	12.0	13.0	20.5	25.3	26.2	24.8	25.2	25.9	21.9	17.9	235
Source: Meteoblue

== Demographics ==
Population census of Balud

Year	Pop.	±% p.a.
1960	14,708	—
1970	21,448	+3.84%
1975	24,219	+2.47%
1980	24,549	+0.27%
1990	26,121	+0.62%
1995	27,933	+1.26%

Year	Pop.	±% p.a.
2000	30,068	+1.59%
2007	31,484	+0.64%
2010	35,841	+4.83%
2015	38,124	+1.18%
2020	40,155	+1.10%
2024	40,236	+0.05%

Source: Philippine Statistics Authority

In the 2024 census, the population of Balud was 40,236 people, with a density of 170 inhabitants per square kilometre or 440 inhabitants per square mile.

== Economy ==
Poverty incidence of Balud

Source: Philippine Statistics Authority

== Education ==
There are two schools district offices which govern all educational institutions within the municipality. They oversee the management and operations of all private and public, from primary to secondary schools. These are the:

- Balud North Schools District
- Balud South Schools District

=== Primary and elementary schools ===
- Antonio Fajardo MS
- Balud Central School
- Bongcanaway Elementary School
- Calumpang Central School
- Cantil Elementary School
- Danao Elementary School
- Enrique A. Bayola Sr. Memmorial Elementary School
- G & A Gutierrez Learning Center
- Guinbanuahan Elementary School
- Ilaya Elementary School
- Immaculate Conception Academy
- Immaculate Conception Academy (Altabano St.)
- Jangan Elementary School
- Lomocab Elementary School
- Mapili Elementary School
- Mapitogo Elementary School
- Nicasio Descalzo Memorial Elementary School
- Pajo Elementary School
- Panguiranan Elementary School
- Panubigan Elementary School
- Pulanduta Elementary School
- Quinayangan Tonga Elementary School
- Salvacion Elementary School
- Sampad Elementary School
- San Andres Elementary School
- San Antonio Elementary School
- St. Anthony of Padua Diocesan School
- Talisay Elementary School
- Tambobo Elementary School
- Tonga Elementary School
- Victory Elementary School
- Vidal Bacolod Memorial School
- Villa Alvarez Elementary School

=== Secondary schools ===
- Balud National High School
- Briccio A. Aninang Sr. Memorial High School
- Casamongan Integrated School
- Liberato P. Tacurda Sr. High School
- Palani Integrated School
- Pedro C. Sese Sr. Memorial High School
- Quinayangan National High School
- Salvador Arollado Sr. Memorial High School
- Ubo Integrated School
- Zapatos Integrated School
