= Milagros, Masbate =

Municipality in Masbate, Philippines

Milagros
- Municipality
- Municipality of Milagros
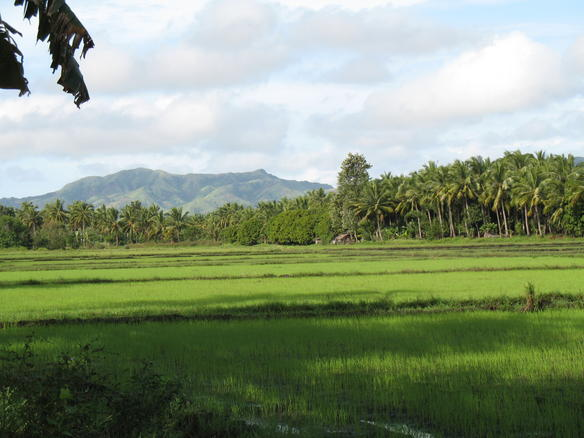
- Rice fields in Milagros

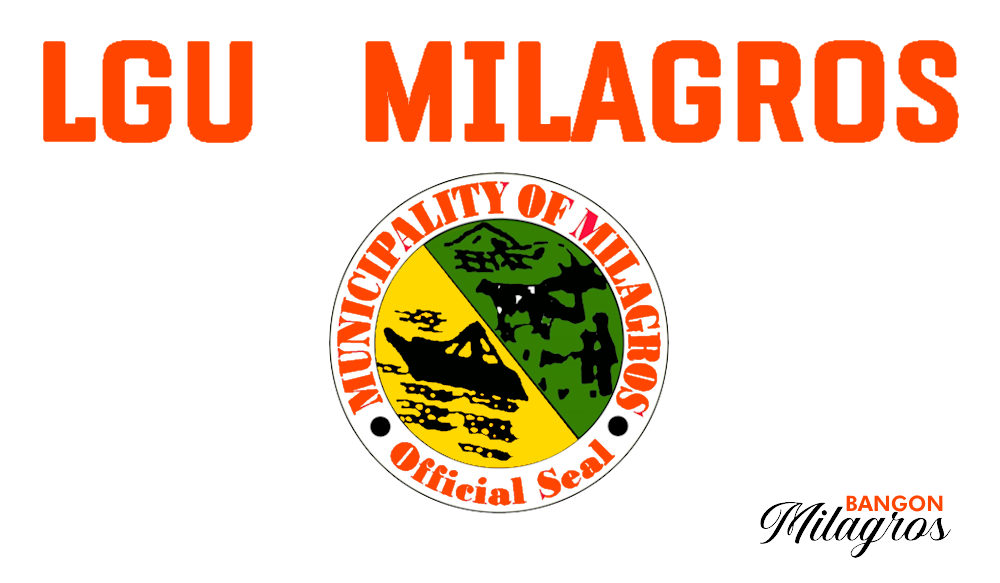
- Flag

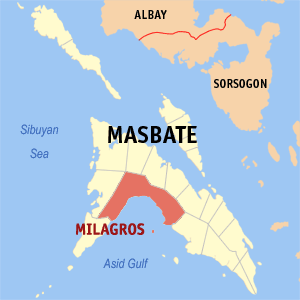
- Map of Masbate with Milagros highlighted
- Interactive map of Milagros
- Location within the Philippines
- Coordinates: 12°13′09″N 123°30′32″E
- Country: Philippines
- Region: Bicol Region
- Province: Masbate
- District: 2nd district
- Barangays: 27 (see Barangays)

Government
  - Type: Sangguniang Bayan
  - Mayor: Natividad Isabel R. Magbalon
  - Vice Mayor: Jose S. Magbalon Jr.
  - Representative: Elisa T. Kho
  - Municipal Council: Members: Joseleo O. Tan; Oscar G. Alba; Jenil M. Rosero; Romeo F. Delgado; Joey D. Avila; Roberto C. Ojeda; Eduardo C. Arcenas; Leopoldo D. Garra III
  - Electorate: 33,250 voters (2025)

Area
  - Total: 565.30 km^{2} (218.26 sq mi)
- Elevation: 11 m (36 ft)
- Highest elevation: 163 m (535 ft)
- Lowest elevation: 0 m (0 ft)

Population (2024 census)
  - Total: 57,362
  - Density: 101.47/km^{2} (262.81/sq mi)
  - Households: 12,371

Economy
  - Income class: 1st municipal income class
  - Poverty incidence: 23.54% (2023)
  - Revenue: ₱ 330.8 million (2024)
  - Assets: ₱ 942.4 million (2024)
  - Expenditure: ₱ 312.7 million (2024)
  - Liabilities: ₱ 266.1 million (2024)

Service provider
  - Electricity: Masbate Electric Cooperative (MASELCO)
- Time zone: UTC+8 (PST)
- ZIP code: 5410
- PSGC: 0504112000
- IDD : area code: +63 (0)56
- Native languages: Masbateño; Tagalog

Milagros, officially the Municipality of Milagros, is a municipality in the province of Masbate, Philippines. According to the 2024 census, it has a population of 57,362 people.

== Etymology ==
Milagros got its name from Spanish word Milagro meaning miracle. Stories handed down from generation to generation told us that the community was founded by early settlers who were peace loving and faithful converted Christians. Early then, coastal communities were the center of trade and commerce because of its facility to transport goods and products to and from the other communities. These were often the targets of marauding “moro” bandits who pillaged and wreaked havoc to victim communities. News of the atrocities caused by these heartless invaders sent shivers to the bones of those peaceful communities.

One day a flotilla of vintas with armed men aboard anchored at the bay ready to attack on signal. People scampered to safety to neighboring hills leaving behind the weak, the sick and the old. Being true believers of the Christian faith, they implored the aid of their patron, St. Joseph to spare them from the wrath of these heartless invaders. Their prayers were not left unanswered. Every time these invaders were poised to attack, they would see myriads of armed combatants with guns and cannons lined up at the shore in a defense position, thus giving the bandits second thoughts of pursuing their attack. Every time these bandits are set to attack these armed combatants always appear. Sensing that they are vulnerable to these invincible defenders, the “moro” bandits called off the attack.

This always happened whenever there were invaders who threaten the peaceful community. News of these events circulated among other bandit groups, which eventually deter them from raiding the community.

For these countless miracles, the community was called “Milagros”.

== History ==
Milagros is one of the original municipalities of Masbate since its creation as a New Province by virtue of Philippine Commission Act. No. 105 enacted on March 18, 1901. It is the mother municipality of Cawayan, Balud and Mandaon until their creation under Executive Order 244.

The former dominant political clan in Milagros was the De Jesus clan and followed by the Abapo clan. In 2015, former Milagros town Mayor Bernardito Abapo was arrested in a raid by the Philippine National Police and Philippine Drug Enforcement Agency on a suspected drug laboratory in Masbate province. The results of the 2007 local elections replaced the Abapo clan by the Magbalon clan. Dr. Natividad Isabel Revil-Magbalon finished her 3-consecutive terms or a total of 9 years as being the mayor of the municipality. Since Dr. Natividad Isabel Magbalon was no longer able to run for mayor, her husband Jose Magbalon Jr. ran on her behalf and won the 2016 elections with 51.2% votes over his opponent Bobet Trias.

== Geography ==
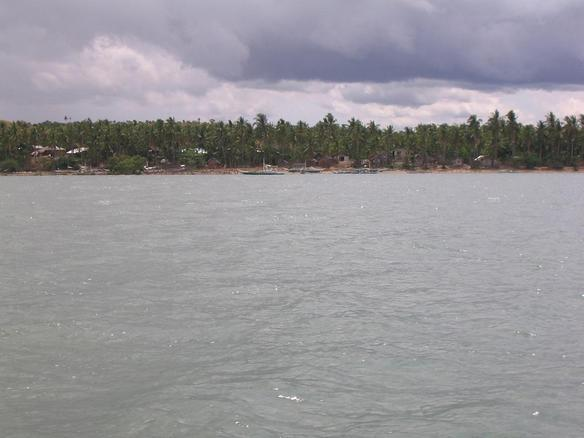
Milagros coast

The municipality is endowed with rich mineral resources the as of to date has partially been tapped. Manganese is being extracted at barangays Pamangpangon and Taisan and as being exported to Japan. Large deposit of white clay, which may be used in making of porcelain products and other novelty items can be found at Barangay Bonbon and Matanglad. Other precious minerals such as gold, copper and silver are also present in the area.

Milagros is facing the Asid Gulf, a rich existing fishing ground which is part of the Visayan Sea, and is the largest municipality in the province in terms of land area.. It is 26 kilometres (16 mi) from Masbate City.

Aware of the need to conserve, protect and manage our marine resources, the LGU has passed the Municipal Fishery Ordinance and Instituted the Coastal Resource Management Program.

Under this program, Bangad Fish Sanctuary was established and Mangrove Reforestation was launched and sustained. Fish wardens are trained and deputized. Other coastal barangays has resorted to seaweeds farming as alternative livelihood and to prevent corals and sea grass from further degradation from drag net and trawl fishing.

=== Barangays ===
Milagros is politically subdivided into 27 barangays with one island barangay and one island sitio.

It is located at the southern part of the Masbate Island duplicating boomerang shape of the Island. It is bounded out the north by the Mobo, Baleno, Masbate City, Mobo, North – East by Uson North West by Aroroy, Mandaon and Balud, On the East by the Municipality of Cawayan and to the south by Asid Gulf.

It is the largest municipality of the province with an area of 56, 540 hectares. It has an estimated population of 50, 100 for the year 2007.

- Bacolod
- Bangad
- Bara
- Bonbon
- Calasuche
- Calumpang
- Capaculan
- Cayabon
- Guinluthangan
- Jamorawon
- Magsalangi
- Matagbac
- Matanglad
- Matiporon
- Moises R. Espinosa
- Narangasan
- Pamangpangon
- Poblacion East
- Poblacion West
- Paraiso (Potot)
- San Antonio
- San Carlos
- Sawmill
- Tagbon
- Tawad
- Tigbao
- Tinaclipan (Bato)

=== Climate ===
Climate data for Milagros, Masbate
Month	Jan	Feb	Mar	Apr	May	Jun	Jul	Aug	Sep	Oct	Nov	Dec	Year
Mean daily maximum °C (°F)	29 (84)	29 (84)	31 (88)	32 (90)	32 (90)	31 (88)	30 (86)	30 (86)	30 (86)	30 (86)	29 (84)	29 (84)	30 (86)
Mean daily minimum °C (°F)	23 (73)	22 (72)	23 (73)	23 (73)	25 (77)	25 (77)	24 (75)	25 (77)	24 (75)	24 (75)	24 (75)	23 (73)	24 (75)
Average precipitation mm (inches)	39 (1.5)	34 (1.3)	42 (1.7)	36 (1.4)	73 (2.9)	109 (4.3)	118 (4.6)	108 (4.3)	129 (5.1)	136 (5.4)	112 (4.4)	89 (3.5)	1,025 (40.4)
Average rainy days	12.6	9.7	12.0	13.0	20.5	25.3	26.2	24.8	25.2	25.9	21.9	17.9	235
Source: Meteoblue

== Demographics ==
Population census of Milagros

Year	Pop.	±% p.a.
1903	6,674	—
1918	10,521	+3.08%
1939	30,171	+5.14%
1948	33,502	+1.17%
1960	17,048	−5.47%
1970	24,480	+3.68%
1975	24,630	+0.12%
1980	28,496	+2.96%

Year	Pop.	±% p.a.
1990	33,305	+1.57%
1995	38,925	+2.96%
2000	44,575	+2.95%
2007	48,185	+1.08%
2010	52,619	+3.26%
2015	57,473	+1.69%
2020	57,538	+0.02%
2024	57,362	−0.07%

Source: Philippine Statistics Authority

In the 2024 census, the population of Milagros was 57,362 people, with a density of 100 inhabitants per square kilometre or 260 inhabitants per square mile.

== Economy ==
Poverty incidence of Milagros (%)

Source: Philippine Statistics Authority

== Education ==
There are two schools district offices which govern all educational institutions within the municipality. They oversee the management and operations of all private and public, from primary to secondary schools. These are the:

- Milagros East Schools District
- Milagros West Schools District

=== Primary and elmentary schools ===
- Amado Beluso Elementary School
- Amazing Progress Learning Center
- Bangad Elementary School
- Bara Elementary School
- Bonbon Elementary School
- Calasuche Elementary School
- Capaclan Elementary School
- Capaculan Elementary School
- Cayabon Elementary School
- Clemente P. Bajar Sr. Elementary School
- Dominador D. Trabado Elementary School
- Francisco D. Lareta Elementary School
- Heracleo De Jesus Elementary School
- Jamorawon Elementary School
- John Miller Elementary School
- Jose Aninang Sr. Elementary School
- Luacan Elementary School
- Magsalangi Elementary School
- Maria Jenneil Learning Center
- Matagbac Elementary School
- Matanglad Elementary School
- Matiporon Elementary School
- Milagros East Central School
- Milagros West Central School
- Moises R. ESpinosa Elementary School
- Mopheth Christian School
- Pamangpangon Elementary School
- Paraiso Elementary School
- Pedro Y. Bautista Elementary School
- San Antonio Elementary School
- San Carlos Elementary School
- San Jose Elementary School
- San Vicente Elementary School
- Sawmill Elementary School
- Shining Hope Baptist Christian Academy
- Tagbon Elementary School
- Taisan Elementary School
- Tawad Elementary School
- Tesa Elementary School
- Tigbao Elementary School
- Tinaclipan Elementary School
- Vicente Oliva Sr. Elementary School

=== Secondary schools ===
- Jamorawon Barangay High School
- Liceo de San Jose
- Mary Perpetua E. Brioso National High School
- Masbate School of Fisheries
- Melchor B. Burlaos Memorial High School
- Milagros National High School
- Revil-Bajar National High School
- Serafin C. Rosero Memorial High School
- Shining Hope Baptist Christian Academy
- Taisan High School
