= Legislative districts of Sorsogon =

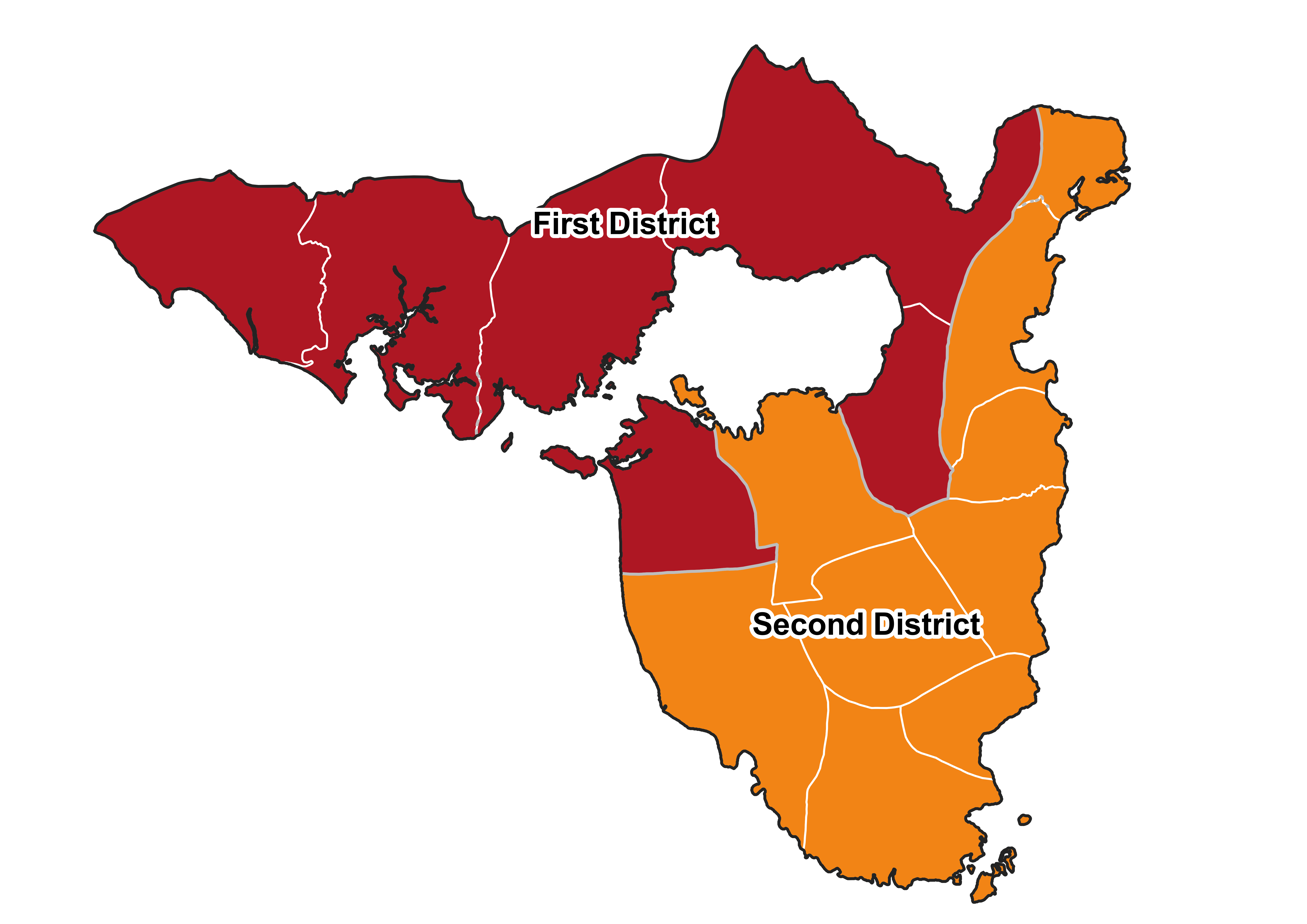

The legislative districts of Sorsogon are the representations of the province of Sorsogon in the various national legislatures of the Philippines. The province is currently represented in the lower house of the Congress of the Philippines through its first and second congressional districts.

== History ==
Sorsogon initially comprised a single district to the Malolos Congress from 1898 to 1899. It was later divided into two congressional districts since 1907, which included Masbate until it was given its own representation in 1922. From 1978 to 1984, it was part of the representation of Region V in the Interim Batasang Pambansa, and it elected two assemblymen at-large in the Regular Batasang Pambansa from 1984 to 1986.

== Current districts ==
Legislative districts and representatives of Sorsogon
District	Current Representative	Party	Constituent LGUs	Population (2020)	Area	Map
1st	Marie Bernadette Escudero (since 2022); Sorsogon City	NPC	List: Casiguran; Castilla; Donsol; Magallanes; Pilar; Sorsogon City	441,959	1,103.73 km^{2}	
2nd	Manuel Fortes, Jr. (since 2022); Barcelona	NPC	List: Barcelona; Bulan; Bulusan; Gubat; Irosin; Juban; Matnog; Prieto Diaz; Santa Magdalena	386,696	1,015.28 km^{2}	

== Historical districts ==
=== At-large (defunct) ===
==== 1943–1944 ====
Period	Representative
National Assembly; 1943–1944	Manuel Estipona
National Assembly; 1943–1944	Rafael Ramos

==== 1984–1986 ====
Period	Representative
Regular Batasang Pambansa; 1984–1986	Salvador H. Escudero III
Regular Batasang Pambansa; 1984–1986	Augusto G. Ortiz

== See also ==
- Legislative districts of Masbate
