= List of members of the House of Representatives of the Philippines (E) =

This is a complete list of past and present members of the House of Representatives of the Philippines whose last names begin with the letter E.

This list also includes members of the Philippine Assembly (1907–1916), the Commonwealth National Assembly (1935–1941), the Second Republic National Assembly (1943–1944) and the Batasang Pambansa (1978–1986).

== Ea ==
- Eugenio Ealdama, member for Iloilo's 1st district (1925–1928)

== Eb ==
- Melvyn Eballe, member for APEC party-list (1998–2001)
- Bienvenido Ebarle, member for Zamboanga del Sur (1984–1986)
- Adriano Ebcas, member for Ako Padayon party-list (2019–2022)
- Jun Omar Ebdane, member for Zambales's 2nd district (2012–2013)

== Ec ==
- Recom Echiverri, member for Caloocan's 1st district (1998–2004, 2013–2016)
- Alan Ecleo, member for Dinagat Islands (2019–2025)
- Glenda Ecleo, member for Surigao del Norte's 1st district (1987–1995, 2001–2007), and Dinagat Islands (2007–2010)
- Ruben Ecleo Jr., member for Dinagat Islands (2010–2012)
- Esmeraldo Eco, member for Camarines Norte (1946–1953)

== Ej ==
- JV Ejercito, member for San Juan (2010–2013)

== El ==
- Sarah Elago, member for Kabataan party-list (2016–2022), and Gabriela party-list 2025–present)
- Fred Elizalde, member for Region IV (1978–1984)

== Em ==
- Yevgeny Emano, member for Misamis Oriental's 2nd district (2007–2013, 2022–present)

== En ==
- Francisco Enage, member for Leyte's 4th district (1912–1916), and Leyte's 1st district (1919–1922)
- Demetrio Encarnacion, member for Cavite (1943–1944)
- Justino Encinas, member for Sorsogon's 1st district (1928–1931)
- Salvador Encinas, member for Sorsogon's 1st district (1953–1972)
- Nicolas Enciso VIII, member for Bicol Saro party-list (2022–2023)
- Canuto Enerio, member for Zamboanga del Sur (1957–1961)
- Jack Enrile, member for Cagayan's 1st district (1998–2007, 2010–2013)
- Juan Ponce Enrile, member for Region II (1978–1984), Cagayan (1984–1986), and Cagayan's 1st district (1992–1995)
- Joaquin Enriquez Jr., member for Region IX (1978–1984)
- Natalio Enriquez, member for Tayabas (1943–1944)
- Anna Katrina Enverga, member for Quezon's 1st district (2016–2019)
- Manuel Enverga, member for Quezon's 1st district (1953–1969)
- Mark Enverga, member for Quezon's 1st district (2007–2016, 2019–present)
- Wilfrido Enverga, member for Quezon's 1st district (1987–1998)

== Er ==
- Edgar Erice, member for Caloocan's 2nd district (2001–2004, 2013–2022, 2025–present)
- Eufranio Eriguel, member for La Union's 2nd district (2010–2016)
- Sandra Eriguel, member for La Union's 2nd district (2016–2022)
- Eduardo Ermita, member for Batangas's 1st district (1992–2001)
- Eileen Ermita-Buhain, member for Batangas's 1st district (2001–2010, 2013–2022)

== Es ==
- Gonzales Escalante, member for Ambos Camarines's 1st district (1916–1919)
- Antonio Escamilla, member for Nueva Vizcaya (1925–1928)
- Agripino Escareal, member for Samar's 1st district (1938–1941, 1946–1953)
- Charles Escolin, member for Capiz (1984–1986)
- Dette Escudero, member for Sorsogon's 1st district (2022–present)
- Evelina Escudero, member for Sorsogon's 1st district (2013–2022)
- Francis Escudero, member for Sorsogon's 1st district (1998–2007)
- Manuel Escudero, member for Sorsogon's 1st district (1916–1919)
- Salvador Escudero, member for Sorsogon (1984–1986), and Sorsogon's 1st district (1987–1996, 2007–2012)
- Mariano Escuate, member for Bulacan's 1st district (1916–1919)
- Moises Escueta, member for Quezon's 1st district (1916–1919)
- Manuel Espaldon, member for Region IX (1978–1984)
- Romulo Espaldon, member for Tawi-Tawi (1990–1992)
- Sofronio Española, member for Palawan (1945–1949)
- Felimon Espares, member for Coop-NATCCO party-list (2022–present)
- Gerardo Espina Sr., member for Region IV (1978–1984), and Biliran (1995–2004)
- Gerardo Espina Jr., member for Biliran (2004–2007, 2019–present)
- Rogelio Espina, member for Biliran (2010–2019)
- Amado Espino Jr., member for Pangasinan's 2nd district (2001–2007), and Pangasinan's 5th district (2016–2019)
- Jumel Anthony Espino, member for Pangasinan's 2nd district (2019–2022)
- Edgar Espinosa, member for Guimaras (2001–2007)
- Emilio Espinosa, member for Masbate (1934–1935, 1943–1944, 1945–1953)
- Emilio Espinosa Jr., member for Masbate (1957–1965, 1969–1972), Region V (1978–1984), and Masbate's 2nd district (1998–2007)
- Jose Espinosa, member for Tarlac's 2nd district (1912–1916)
- Moises Espinosa Sr., member for Masbate's 3rd district (1987–1989)
- Pascual Espinosa, member for Iloilo's 2nd district (1949–1953, 1957–1961)
- Tito Espinosa, member for Masbate's 1st district (1987–1995)
- Vida Espinosa, member for Masbate's 1st district (1995–2004)
- Pedro Espiritu, member for Cavite (1922–1925)
- Felipe Estella, member for Zambales (1934–1935)
- Manuel Estipona, member for Sorsogon (1943–1944)
- Santiago Estrada, member for Pangasinan (1943–1944)
- Eva Estrada Kalaw, member for Manila (1984–1986)
- Conrado Estrella Sr., member for Region I (1978–1984), and Pangasinan (1984–1986)
- Conrado Estrella Jr., member for Pangasinan's 5th district (1987–1992)
- Conrado Estrella III, member for Pangasinan's 6th district (1987–1995, 2001–2010), and Abono party-list (2013–2022)
- Ernesto Estrella, member for Surigao del Sur's 2nd district (1987–1995)
- Robert Estrella Sr., member for Pangasinan's 5th district (1969–1972)
- Robert Raymond Estrella, member for Abono party-list (2007–2013, 2022–2025, 2025–present)

== Et ==
- Luis Etcubañez, member for Aurora (1984–1986)

== Eu ==
- Richard Eusebio, member for Pasig (2016–2019)
- Antonieta Eudela, member for Zamboanga Sibugay's 2nd district (2022–2025)

== Ev ==
- Daniel Evangelista, member for Iloilo's 4th district (1919–1922)
- Jose Evangelista, member for Iloilo's 1st district (1919–1925)
- Ben Evardone, member for Eastern Samar (2010–2019)

== Ex ==
- Pedro Exmundo, member for Region VI (1978–1984)
