= Sorsogon's 1st congressional district =

Legislative district of the Philippines

- Constituency for the House of Representatives of the Philippines
- Boundary of the 1st congressional district in Sorsogon

- Location of Sorsogon within the Philippines
- Province: Sorsogon
- Region: Bicol Region
- Population: 441,959 (2020)
- Electorate: 274,532 (2022)
- Major settlements: 6 LGUs: Cities; Sorsogon City; Municipalities; Casiguran; Castilla; Donsol; Magallanes; Pilar
- Area: 1,103.73 km^{2} (426.15 sq mi)

Current constituency
- Created: 1907
- Representative: Maria Bernadette G. Escudero
- Political party: NPC
- Congressional bloc: Majority

Sorsogon's 1st congressional district is one of the two congressional districts of the Philippines in the province of Sorsogon. It has been represented in the House of Representatives of the Philippines since 1916 and earlier in the Philippine Assembly from 1907 to 1916. The district consists of the provincial capital, Sorsogon City, and adjacent municipalities of Casiguran, Castilla, Donsol, Magallanes and Pilar. It is currently represented in the 20th Congress by Maria Bernadette G. Escudero of the Nationalist People's Coalition (NPC).

Prior to its second dissolution in 1972, it consisted of the eastern municipalities of Barcelona, Bulan, Bulusan, Gubat, Irosin, Matnog, Prieto Diaz, and Santa Magdalena. The municipality of Casiguran was first part of this district until it was reapportioned to the second district effective 1922 as a result of the establishment of Masbate as an independent province in 1920.

== Representation history ==
#	Image	Member	Term of office		Legislature	Party	Electoral history	Constituent LGUs
#	Image	Member	Start	End	Legislature	Party	Electoral history	Constituent LGUs
=== Sorsogon's 1st district for the Philippine Assembly ===
District created January 9, 1907.
1		Vicente de Vera	October 16, 1907	October 16, 1909	1st	Independent	Elected in 1907.	1907–1916; Bacon, Barcelona, Bulusan, Casiguran, Castilla, Gubat, Irosin, Juban, Matnog, Prieto Diaz, Santa Magdalena, Sorsogon
2		Leoncio Grajo	October 16, 1909	October 16, 1916	2nd	Nacionalista	Elected in 1909.	1907–1916; Bacon, Barcelona, Bulusan, Casiguran, Castilla, Gubat, Irosin, Juban, Matnog, Prieto Diaz, Santa Magdalena, Sorsogon
2		Leoncio Grajo	October 16, 1909	October 16, 1916	3rd	Nacionalista	Re-elected in 1912.	1907–1916; Bacon, Barcelona, Bulusan, Casiguran, Castilla, Gubat, Irosin, Juban, Matnog, Prieto Diaz, Santa Magdalena, Sorsogon
=== Sorsogon's 1st district for the House of Representatives of the Philippine Islands ===
3		Manuel Escudero	October 16, 1916	June 3, 1919	4th	Independent	Elected in 1916.	1916–1922; Bacon, Barcelona, Bulusan, Casiguran, Castilla, Gubat, Irosin, Juban, Matnog, Prieto Diaz, Santa Magdalena, Sorsogon
(2)		Leoncio Grajo	June 3, 1919	June 6, 1922	5th	Nacionalista	Elected in 1919.	1916–1922; Bacon, Barcelona, Bulusan, Casiguran, Castilla, Gubat, Irosin, Juban, Matnog, Prieto Diaz, Santa Magdalena, Sorsogon
4		Antonio H. Rocha	June 6, 1922	June 2, 1925	6th	Demócrata	Elected in 1922.	1922–1935; Barcelona, Bulan, Bulusan, Gubat, Irosin, Matnog, Prieto Diaz, Santa Magdalena
5		Juan Reyes	June 2, 1925	June 5, 1928	7th	Demócrata	Elected in 1925.	1922–1935; Barcelona, Bulan, Bulusan, Gubat, Irosin, Matnog, Prieto Diaz, Santa Magdalena
6		Justino Encinas	June 5, 1928	June 2, 1931	8th	Nacionalista; Consolidado	Elected in 1928.	1922–1935; Barcelona, Bulan, Bulusan, Gubat, Irosin, Matnog, Prieto Diaz, Santa Magdalena
7		Adolfo Gerona	June 2, 1931	September 16, 1935	9th	Nacionalista; Consolidado	Elected in 1931.	1922–1935; Barcelona, Bulan, Bulusan, Gubat, Irosin, Matnog, Prieto Diaz, Santa Magdalena
7		Adolfo Gerona	June 2, 1931	September 16, 1935	10th	Nacionalista; Democrático	Re-elected in 1934.	1922–1935; Barcelona, Bulan, Bulusan, Gubat, Irosin, Matnog, Prieto Diaz, Santa Magdalena
#	Image	Member	Term of office		National Assembly	Party	Electoral history	Constituent LGUs
#	Image	Member	Start	End	National Assembly	Party	Electoral history	Constituent LGUs
=== Sorsogon's 1st district for the National Assembly (Commonwealth of the Philippines) ===
8		Norberto A. Roque	September 16, 1935	December 30, 1941	1st	Nacionalista; Democrático	Elected in 1935.	1935–1941; Barcelona, Bulan, Bulusan, Gubat, Irosin, Matnog, Prieto Diaz, Santa Magdalena
8		Norberto A. Roque	September 16, 1935	December 30, 1941	2nd	Nacionalista	Re-elected in 1938.	1935–1941; Barcelona, Bulan, Bulusan, Gubat, Irosin, Matnog, Prieto Diaz, Santa Magdalena
District dissolved into the two-seat Sorsogon's at-large district for the National Assembly (Second Philippine Republic).
#	Image	Member	Term of office		Common wealth Congress	Party	Electoral history	Constituent LGUs
#	Image	Member	Start	End	Common wealth Congress	Party	Electoral history	Constituent LGUs
=== Sorsogon's 1st district for the House of Representatives of the Commonwealth of the Philippines ===
District re-created May 24, 1945.
(8)		Norberto A. Roque	June 11, 1945	May 25, 1946	1st	Nacionalista	Re-elected in 1941.	1945–1946; Barcelona, Bulan, Bulusan, Gubat, Irosin, Matnog, Prieto Diaz, Santa Magdalena
#	Image	Member	Term of office		Congress	Party	Electoral history	Constituent LGUs
#	Image	Member	Start	End	Congress	Party	Electoral history	Constituent LGUs
=== Sorsogon's 1st district for the House of Representatives of the Philippines ===
9		Pacifico F. Lim	May 25, 1946	December 30, 1949	1st	Liberal	Elected in 1946.	1946–1972; Barcelona, Bulan, Bulusan, Gubat, Irosin, Matnog, Prieto Diaz, Santa Magdalena
10		Modesto G. Galias	December 30, 1949	December 30, 1953	2nd	Liberal	Elected in 1949.	1946–1972; Barcelona, Bulan, Bulusan, Gubat, Irosin, Matnog, Prieto Diaz, Santa Magdalena
11		Salvador R. Encinas	December 30, 1953	September 23, 1972	3rd	Nacionalista	Elected in 1953.	1946–1972; Barcelona, Bulan, Bulusan, Gubat, Irosin, Matnog, Prieto Diaz, Santa Magdalena
11		Salvador R. Encinas	December 30, 1953	September 23, 1972	4th	Nacionalista	Re-elected in 1957.	1946–1972; Barcelona, Bulan, Bulusan, Gubat, Irosin, Matnog, Prieto Diaz, Santa Magdalena
11		Salvador R. Encinas	December 30, 1953	September 23, 1972	5th	Nacionalista	Re-elected in 1961.	1946–1972; Barcelona, Bulan, Bulusan, Gubat, Irosin, Matnog, Prieto Diaz, Santa Magdalena
11		Salvador R. Encinas	December 30, 1953	September 23, 1972	6th	Liberal	Re-elected in 1965.	1946–1972; Barcelona, Bulan, Bulusan, Gubat, Irosin, Matnog, Prieto Diaz, Santa Magdalena
11		Salvador R. Encinas	December 30, 1953	September 23, 1972	7th	Liberal	Re-elected in 1969. Removed from office after imposition of martial law.	1946–1972; Barcelona, Bulan, Bulusan, Gubat, Irosin, Matnog, Prieto Diaz, Santa Magdalena
District dissolved into the twelve-seat Region V's at-large district for the Interim Batasang Pambansa, followed by the two-seat Sorsogon's at-large district for the Regular Batasang Pambansa.
District re-created February 2, 1987.
12		Salvador Escudero	June 30, 1987	April 15, 1996	8th	KBL	Elected in 1987.	1987–2001; Casiguran, Castilla, Donsol, Magallanes, Pilar, Sorsogon
12		Salvador Escudero	June 30, 1987	April 15, 1996	9th	NPC	Re-elected in 1992.	1987–2001; Casiguran, Castilla, Donsol, Magallanes, Pilar, Sorsogon
12		Salvador Escudero	June 30, 1987	April 15, 1996	10th	NPC	Re-elected in 1995. Resigned on appointment as Secretary of Agriculture.	1987–2001; Casiguran, Castilla, Donsol, Magallanes, Pilar, Sorsogon
13		Francis Escudero	June 30, 1998	June 30, 2007	11th	LAMMP	Elected in 1998.	1987–2001; Casiguran, Castilla, Donsol, Magallanes, Pilar, Sorsogon
13		Francis Escudero	June 30, 1998	June 30, 2007	12th	NPC	Elected in 2001.	2001–present Casiguran, Castilla, Donsol, Magallanes, Pilar, Sorsogon City
13		Francis Escudero	June 30, 1998	June 30, 2007	13th	NPC	Re-elected in 2004.	2001–present Casiguran, Castilla, Donsol, Magallanes, Pilar, Sorsogon City
(12)		Salvador Escudero	June 30, 2007	August 13, 2012	14th	NPC	Elected in 2007.	2001–present Casiguran, Castilla, Donsol, Magallanes, Pilar, Sorsogon City
(12)		Salvador Escudero	June 30, 2007	August 13, 2012	15th	Liberal	Re-elected in 2010. Died.	2001–present Casiguran, Castilla, Donsol, Magallanes, Pilar, Sorsogon City
14		Evelina G. Escudero	June 30, 2013	June 30, 2022	16th	NPC	Elected in 2013.	2001–present Casiguran, Castilla, Donsol, Magallanes, Pilar, Sorsogon City
14		Evelina G. Escudero	June 30, 2013	June 30, 2022	17th	NPC	Re-elected in 2016.	2001–present Casiguran, Castilla, Donsol, Magallanes, Pilar, Sorsogon City
14		Evelina G. Escudero	June 30, 2013	June 30, 2022	18th	NPC	Re-elected in 2019.	2001–present Casiguran, Castilla, Donsol, Magallanes, Pilar, Sorsogon City
15		Maria Bernadette G. Escudero	June 30, 2022	Incumbent	19th	NPC	Elected in 2022.	2001–present Casiguran, Castilla, Donsol, Magallanes, Pilar, Sorsogon City
15		Maria Bernadette G. Escudero	June 30, 2022	Incumbent	20th	NPC	Re-elected in 2025.	2001–present Casiguran, Castilla, Donsol, Magallanes, Pilar, Sorsogon City

== Election results ==
=== 2025 ===
Candidate	Party	Votes	%
Dette Escudero (incumbent)	Nationalist People's Coalition	197,919	100.00
Total		197,919	100.00
Valid votes		197,919	82.70
Invalid/blank votes		41,401	17.30
Total votes		239,320	100.00
Registered voters/turnout		282,352	84.76
Nationalist People's Coalition hold			
Source: Commission on Elections

=== 2022 ===
2022 Philippine House of Representatives elections
Party	Candidate	Votes	%
NPC	Maria Bernadette "Dette" Escudero	141,922	
NUP	Joan Lorenzano	71,217	
Independent	Rommel Japson	2,149	
Total votes		215,288	100
NPC hold			

=== 2019 ===
2019 Philippine House of Representatives elections
Party	Candidate	Votes	%
NPC	Evelina Escudero (incumbent)	118,436	
PDP–Laban	Christine Balita	62,051	
PFP	Eddie Lotino	1,564	
Total votes			100
NPC hold			

=== 2016 ===
2016 Philippine House of Representatives elections
Party	Candidate	Votes	%
NPC	Evelina Escudero (incumbent)	116,069	
Invalid or blank votes		64,305	
Total votes		180,374	
NPC hold			

=== 2013 ===
2013 Philippine House of Representatives elections
Party	Candidate	Votes	%
NPC	Evelina Escudero	55,425	50.34
Independent	Aeneas Eli Diaz	28,006	25.43
Independent	Arnulfo Perete	12,581	11.43
Margin of victory		27,419	24.90%
Invalid or blank votes		14,099	12.80
Total votes		110,111	100.00
NPC hold			

=== 2010 ===
2010 Philippine House of Representatives elections
Party	Candidate	Votes	%
Liberal	Salvador Escudero III	89,512	54.56
Nacionalista	Edwin Hamor	63,287	38.57
Valid ballots		152,799	93.13
Invalid or blank votes		11,274	6.87
Total votes		164,073	100.00
Liberal hold			

== See also ==
- Legislative districts of Sorsogon
