= Sorsogon's 2nd congressional district =

Legislative district of the Philippines

- Constituency for the House of Representatives of the Philippines
- Boundary of the 2nd congressional district in Sorsogon

- Location of Sorsogon within the Philippines
- Province: Sorsogon
- Region: Bicol Region
- Population: 386,696 (2020)
- Electorate: 263,550 (2022)
- Major settlements: 9 LGUs: Municipalities; Barcelona; Bulan; Bulusan; Gubat; Irosin; Juban; Matnog; Prieto Diaz; Santa Magdalena
- Area: 1,015.28 km^{2} (392.00 sq mi)

Current constituency
- Created: 1907
- Representative: Manuel L. Fortes Jr.
- Political party: NPC
- Congressional bloc: Majority

Sorsogon's 2nd congressional district is one of the two congressional districts of the Philippines in the province of Sorsogon. It has been represented in the House of Representatives of the Philippines since 1916 and earlier in the Philippine Assembly from 1907 to 1916. The district consists of the municipalities of Barcelona, Bulan, Bulusan, Gubat, Irosin, Juban, Matnog, Prieto Diaz and Santa Magdalena. It was represented in the 20th Congress by Manuel L. Fortes Jr. of the Nationalist People's Coalition (NPC).

Prior to its second dissolution in 1972, it consisted of the western municipalities of Sorsogon (the provincial capital), Bacon, Casiguran (from 1922), Castilla, Donsol, Juban, Magallanes, and Pilar. It also had consisted the sub-province of Masbate until 1922, two years after its establishment as an independent province.

== Representation history ==
#	Image	Member	Term of office		Legislature	Party	Electoral history	Constituent LGUs
#	Image	Member	Start	End	Legislature	Party	Electoral history	Constituent LGUs
=== Sorsogon's 2nd district for the Philippine Assembly ===
District created January 9, 1907.
1		Pedro Chaves	October 16, 1907	October 16, 1909	1st	Nacionalista	Elected in 1907.	1907–1912; Aroroy, Bulan, Cataingan, Dimasalang, Donsol, Magallanes, Mandaon, Masbate, Milagros, Mobo, Pilar, Placer, Pulanduta, San Fernando, San Jacinto, San Pascual, Uson
2		José Zurbito	October 16, 1909	October 16, 1916	2nd	Nacionalista	Elected in 1909.	1907–1912; Aroroy, Bulan, Cataingan, Dimasalang, Donsol, Magallanes, Mandaon, Masbate, Milagros, Mobo, Pilar, Placer, Pulanduta, San Fernando, San Jacinto, San Pascual, Uson
2		José Zurbito	October 16, 1909	October 16, 1916	3rd	Nacionalista	Re-elected in 1912.	1912–1916; Aroroy, Bulan, Cataingan, Dimasalang, Donsol, Magallanes, Masbate, Milagros, Pilar, San Fernando, San Jacinto, San Pascual
=== Sorsogon's 2nd district for the House of Representatives of the Philippine Islands ===
3		Amancio Aguilar	October 16, 1916	June 3, 1919	4th	Nacionalista	Elected in 1916.	1916–1922; Aroroy, Bulan, Cataingan, Dimasalang, Donsol, Magallanes, Masbate, Milagros, Pilar, San Fernando, San Jacinto, San Pascual
4		Pablo de la Rosa	June 3, 1919	June 6, 1922	5th	Nacionalista	Elected in 1919. Redistricted to Masbate's at-large district.	1916–1922; Aroroy, Bulan, Cataingan, Dimasalang, Donsol, Magallanes, Masbate, Milagros, Pilar, San Fernando, San Jacinto, San Pascual
5		Federico D. Jiménez	June 6, 1922	June 2, 1925	6th	Demócrata	Elected in 1922.	1922–1935; Bacon, Casiguran, Castilla, Donsol, Juban, Magallanes, Pilar, Sorsogon
6		Mario Guariña	June 2, 1925	June 5, 1928	7th	Nacionalista; Consolidado	Elected in 1925.	1922–1935; Bacon, Casiguran, Castilla, Donsol, Juban, Magallanes, Pilar, Sorsogon
7		Francisco Arellano	June 5, 1928	June 2, 1931	8th	Nacionalista; Consolidado	Elected in 1928.	1922–1935; Bacon, Casiguran, Castilla, Donsol, Juban, Magallanes, Pilar, Sorsogon
8		Fernando B. Durán	June 2, 1931	September 16, 1935	9th	Nacionalista; Consolidado	Elected in 1931.	1922–1935; Bacon, Casiguran, Castilla, Donsol, Juban, Magallanes, Pilar, Sorsogon
8		Fernando B. Durán	June 2, 1931	September 16, 1935	10th	Nacionalista; Democrático	Re-elected in 1934.	1922–1935; Bacon, Casiguran, Castilla, Donsol, Juban, Magallanes, Pilar, Sorsogon
#	Image	Member	Term of office		National Assembly	Party	Electoral history	Constituent LGUs
#	Image	Member	Start	End	National Assembly	Party	Electoral history	Constituent LGUs
=== Sorsogon's 2nd district for the National Assembly (Commonwealth of the Philippines) ===
9		Tomás S. Clemente	September 16, 1935	December 30, 1941	1st	Nacionalista; Democrático	Elected in 1935.	1935–1941; Bacon, Casiguran, Castilla, Donsol, Juban, Magallanes, Pilar, Sorsogon
9		Tomás S. Clemente	September 16, 1935	December 30, 1941	2nd	Nacionalista	Re-elected in 1938.	1935–1941; Bacon, Casiguran, Castilla, Donsol, Juban, Magallanes, Pilar, Sorsogon
District dissolved into the two-seat Sorsogon's at-large district for the National Assembly (Second Philippine Republic).
#	Image	Member	Term of office		Common wealth Congress	Party	Electoral history	Constituent LGUs
#	Image	Member	Start	End	Common wealth Congress	Party	Electoral history	Constituent LGUs
=== Sorsogon's 2nd district for the House of Representatives of the Commonwealth of the Philippines ===
District re-created May 24, 1945.
10		Teodoro de Vera	June 12, 1945	May 25, 1946	1st	Nacionalista	Elected in 1941. Oath taking deferred.	1945–1946; Bacon, Casiguran, Castilla, Donsol, Juban, Magallanes, Pilar, Sorsogon
#	Image	Member	Term of office		Congress	Party	Electoral history	Constituent LGUs
#	Image	Member	Start	End	Congress	Party	Electoral history	Constituent LGUs
=== Sorsogon's 2nd district for the House of Representatives of the Philippines ===
(9)		Tomás S. Clemente	May 25, 1946	December 30, 1953	1st	Liberal	Elected in 1946.	1946–1972; Bacon, Casiguran, Castilla, Donsol, Juban, Magallanes, Pilar, Sorsogon
(9)		Tomás S. Clemente	May 25, 1946	December 30, 1953	2nd	Liberal	Re-elected in 1949.	1946–1972; Bacon, Casiguran, Castilla, Donsol, Juban, Magallanes, Pilar, Sorsogon
11		Vicente Peralta	December 30, 1953	June 13, 1968	3rd	Nacionalista	Elected in 1953.	1946–1972; Bacon, Casiguran, Castilla, Donsol, Juban, Magallanes, Pilar, Sorsogon
11		Vicente Peralta	December 30, 1953	June 13, 1968	4th	Nacionalista	Re-elected in 1957.	1946–1972; Bacon, Casiguran, Castilla, Donsol, Juban, Magallanes, Pilar, Sorsogon
11		Vicente Peralta	December 30, 1953	June 13, 1968	5th	Nacionalista	Re-elected in 1961.	1946–1972; Bacon, Casiguran, Castilla, Donsol, Juban, Magallanes, Pilar, Sorsogon
11		Vicente Peralta	December 30, 1953	June 13, 1968	6th	Nacionalista	Re-elected in 1965. Died.	1946–1972; Bacon, Casiguran, Castilla, Donsol, Juban, Magallanes, Pilar, Sorsogon
12		Rafael C. Aquino	December 30, 1969	September 23, 1972	7th	Nacionalista	Elected in 1969. Removed from office after imposition of martial law.	1946–1972; Bacon, Casiguran, Castilla, Donsol, Juban, Magallanes, Pilar, Sorsogon
District dissolved into the twelve-seat Region V's at-large district for the Interim Batasang Pambansa, followed by the two-seat Sorsogon's at-large district for the Regular Batasang Pambansa.
District re-created February 2, 1987.
13		Bonifacio Gillego	June 30, 1987	June 30, 1998	8th	LABAN	Elected in 1987.	1987–present Barcelona, Bulan, Bulusan, Gubat, Irosin, Juban, Matnog, Prieto Diaz, Santa Magdalena
13		Bonifacio Gillego	June 30, 1987	June 30, 1998	9th	Lakas	Re-elected in 1992.	1987–present Barcelona, Bulan, Bulusan, Gubat, Irosin, Juban, Matnog, Prieto Diaz, Santa Magdalena
13		Bonifacio Gillego	June 30, 1987	June 30, 1998	10th	Lakas	Re-elected in 1995.	1987–present Barcelona, Bulan, Bulusan, Gubat, Irosin, Juban, Matnog, Prieto Diaz, Santa Magdalena
14		Rodolfo F. Gonzales	June 30, 1998	June 30, 2001	11th	LAMMP	Elected in 1998.	1987–present Barcelona, Bulan, Bulusan, Gubat, Irosin, Juban, Matnog, Prieto Diaz, Santa Magdalena
15		Jose G. Solis	June 30, 2001	June 30, 2010	12th	Lakas	Elected in 2001.	1987–present Barcelona, Bulan, Bulusan, Gubat, Irosin, Juban, Matnog, Prieto Diaz, Santa Magdalena
15		Jose G. Solis	June 30, 2001	June 30, 2010	13th	Lakas	Re-elected in 2004.	1987–present Barcelona, Bulan, Bulusan, Gubat, Irosin, Juban, Matnog, Prieto Diaz, Santa Magdalena
15		Jose G. Solis	June 30, 2001	June 30, 2010	14th	Lakas	Re-elected in 2007.	1987–present Barcelona, Bulan, Bulusan, Gubat, Irosin, Juban, Matnog, Prieto Diaz, Santa Magdalena
16		Deogracias B. Ramos Jr.	June 30, 2010	June 30, 2019	15th	Liberal	Elected in 2010.	1987–present Barcelona, Bulan, Bulusan, Gubat, Irosin, Juban, Matnog, Prieto Diaz, Santa Magdalena
16		Deogracias B. Ramos Jr.	June 30, 2010	June 30, 2019	16th	Liberal	Re-elected in 2013.	1987–present Barcelona, Bulan, Bulusan, Gubat, Irosin, Juban, Matnog, Prieto Diaz, Santa Magdalena
16		Deogracias B. Ramos Jr.	June 30, 2010	June 30, 2019	17th	PDP–Laban	Re-elected in 2016.	1987–present Barcelona, Bulan, Bulusan, Gubat, Irosin, Juban, Matnog, Prieto Diaz, Santa Magdalena
17		Bernardita Ramos	June 30, 2019	September 8, 2020	18th	NPC	Elected in 2019. Died.	1987–present Barcelona, Bulan, Bulusan, Gubat, Irosin, Juban, Matnog, Prieto Diaz, Santa Magdalena
—	vacant		September 8, 2020	June 30, 2022	18th	–	No special election held to fill vacancy.	1987–present Barcelona, Bulan, Bulusan, Gubat, Irosin, Juban, Matnog, Prieto Diaz, Santa Magdalena
18		Manuel L. Fortes Jr.	June 30, 2022	Incumbent	19th	NPC	Elected in 2022.	1987–present Barcelona, Bulan, Bulusan, Gubat, Irosin, Juban, Matnog, Prieto Diaz, Santa Magdalena
18		Manuel L. Fortes Jr.	June 30, 2022	Incumbent	20th	NPC	Re-elected in 2025.	1987–present Barcelona, Bulan, Bulusan, Gubat, Irosin, Juban, Matnog, Prieto Diaz, Santa Magdalena

== Election results ==
=== 2025 ===
Candidate	Party	Votes	%
Wowo Fortes (incumbent)	Nationalist People's Coalition	154,962	73.36
Kruni Escudero	Partido Federal ng Pilipinas	51,759	24.50
Nono Lopez	Independent	2,081	0.99
Totie Gabales	Independent	1,527	0.72
Jack Holaso	Independent	920	0.44
Total		211,249	100.00
Valid votes		211,249	89.51
Invalid/blank votes		24,762	10.49
Total votes		236,011	100.00
Registered voters/turnout		270,888	87.12
Nationalist People's Coalition hold			
Source: Commission on Elections

=== 2022 ===
2022 Philippine House of Representatives elections
Party	Candidate	Votes	%
NPC	Manuel "Wowo" Fortes Jr.	102,103	
NUP	Robert "Bobet" Lee Rodrigueza	93,996	
Lakas	Cris Gotladera	6,853	
PDDS	Edgar Gino	2,650	
Total votes			
NPC hold			

=== 2019 ===
2019 Philippine House of Representatives elections
Party	Candidate	Votes	%
NPC	Bernardita Ramos	110,264	
PDP–Laban	Robert "Bobet" Lee Rodrigueza	57,711	
Lakas	Randy Medina	4,107	
Independent	Juan Escandor Jr.	4,023	
Independent	Jack Holaso	665	
Total votes			
NPC gain from PDP–Laban			

=== 2016 ===
2016 Philippine House of Representatives elections
Party	Candidate	Votes	%
Liberal	Deogracias Ramos Jr.	111,608	
PDP–Laban	Eduardo Ong Jr.	47,040	
Invalid or blank votes		24,958	
Total votes		183,606	
Liberal hold			

=== 2013 ===
2013 Philippine House of Representatives elections
Party	Candidate	Votes	%
Liberal	Deogracias Ramos, Jr.	79,442	59.07
UNA	Guillermo de Castro	32,121	23.88
PMP	Sappho Gillego	6,346	4.72
Independent	Jose Solis	1,236	0.92
Margin of victory		47,321	35.19%
Invalid or blank votes		15,343	11.41
Total votes		134,488	100.00
Liberal hold			

=== 2010 ===
2010 Philippine House of Representatives elections
Party	Candidate	Votes	%
Liberal	Deogracias Ramos Jr.	30,945	19.45
NPC	Ricardo Golpeo	29,780	18.72
Nacionalista	Juan Guysayko	28,852	18.13
PDP–Laban	Arze Glipo	14,838	9.32
Lakas–Kampi	Flocerfida de Guzman	13,822	8.69
Independent	Sappho Gillego Ong	12,142	7.63
Independent	Cyril Ramos	10,501	6.60
PMP	Edmundo Escalante	1,168	0.73
Independent	Rosario Gavanzo	629	0.40
Valid ballots		142,677	89.67
Invalid or blank votes		16,441	10.33
Total votes		159,118	100.00
Liberal gain from Lakas–Kampi			

== See also ==
- Legislative districts of Sorsogon
