= Casiguran =

Casiguran may refer to the following municipalities in the Philippines:

- Casiguran, Aurora
- Casiguran, Sorsogon
