= Evelina Escudero =

Filipino educator and politician

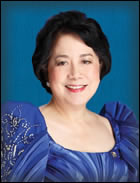
- Official portrait, 2013

Deputy Speaker of the House of Representatives of the Philippines
- In office July 22, 2019 – June 30, 2022
- House Speaker: Alan Peter Cayetano; Lord Allan Velasco
- In office August 29, 2018 – June 4, 2019
- House Speaker: Gloria Macapagal-Arroyo
- Preceded by: Rolando Andaya Jr.

Member of the Philippine House of Representatives from Sorsogon's 1st district
- In office June 30, 2013 – June 30, 2022
- Preceded by: Salvador Escudero
- Succeeded by: Dette Escudero

Personal details
- Born: Evelina Buencamino Guevara; December 16, 1942 (age 83) Quezon City, City of Greater Manila, Philippines
- Party: NPC (2012–present)
- Spouse: Salvador Escudero (died 2012)
- Children: 3 (including Chiz and Dette)
- Education: University of the Philippines Diliman

Evelina Buencamino Guevara-Escudero (born December 16, 1942) is a Filipino educator and politician who was a member of the House of Representatives of the Philippines representing Sorsogon's 1st congressional district from 2013 to 2022. She won the position following the death of her husband and predecessor, Salvador Escudero. She is the mother of Senate President Francis Escudero and House Deputy Majority Leader Dette Escudero and the grandmother of actor Martin Escudero.

Guevara-Escudero was born and raised in Quezon City. She graduated from University of the Philippines (UP) in 1964 with a degree in home economics, major in food and nutrition. She also obtained her masters and doctorate degree in education from the same university in 1999 and 2004, respectively. She was a UP College of Home Economics faculty member and was active in various organizations including becoming president of the UP Home Economics Alumni Association and treasurer of the UP Alumni Association. From 1987 to 1996, she was a professor at OB Montessori Professional High School and from 1996 to at least 2012, professor at OB Montessori College. In 2012, she was appointed by then-President Benigno Aquino III to the UP Board of Regents.

Guevara-Escudero was married to Salvador Escudero and has three children. Following her husband's death in August 2012, she ran for his vacant seat in the 2013 elections and won, garnering 55,425 or 50% of the total votes cast. She ran unopposed in the succeeding 2016 election and won again in 2019 garnering 118,436 votes. In all of these elections, she ran under the Nationalist People's Coalition party.

In the 17th Congress, Guevara-Escudero served as the chairperson of the Committee on Basic Education and Culture from 2016 to 2017. She was ousted from her position after voting "no" to a bill seeking to revive the death penalty. She also served as vice-chairperson of the Committee on Ethics and Privileges, and was a Deputy Speaker from August 2018 to June 2019 during the speakership of Gloria Macapagal Arroyo. She was again named Deputy Speaker in the 18th Congress and served in that position during her entire third term. In 2019, she filed a bill that would seek to remove homework as a requirement for Kinder to Grade 12 students. Following the death of Representative Bernardita Ramos of Sorsogon's 2nd district in September 2020 due to COVID-19, Guevara-Escudero was designated as the legislative caretaker of her district.

She is currently a trustee of the Government Service Insurance System since August 2022.

House of Representatives of the Philippines
Preceded by Salvador Escudero	Member of the House of Representatives from Sorsogon's 1st district 2013–2022	Succeeded by Maria Bernadette Escudero
