= Castilla, Sorsogon =

Municipality in Sorsogon, Philippines

Castilla
- Municipality
- Municipality of Castilla
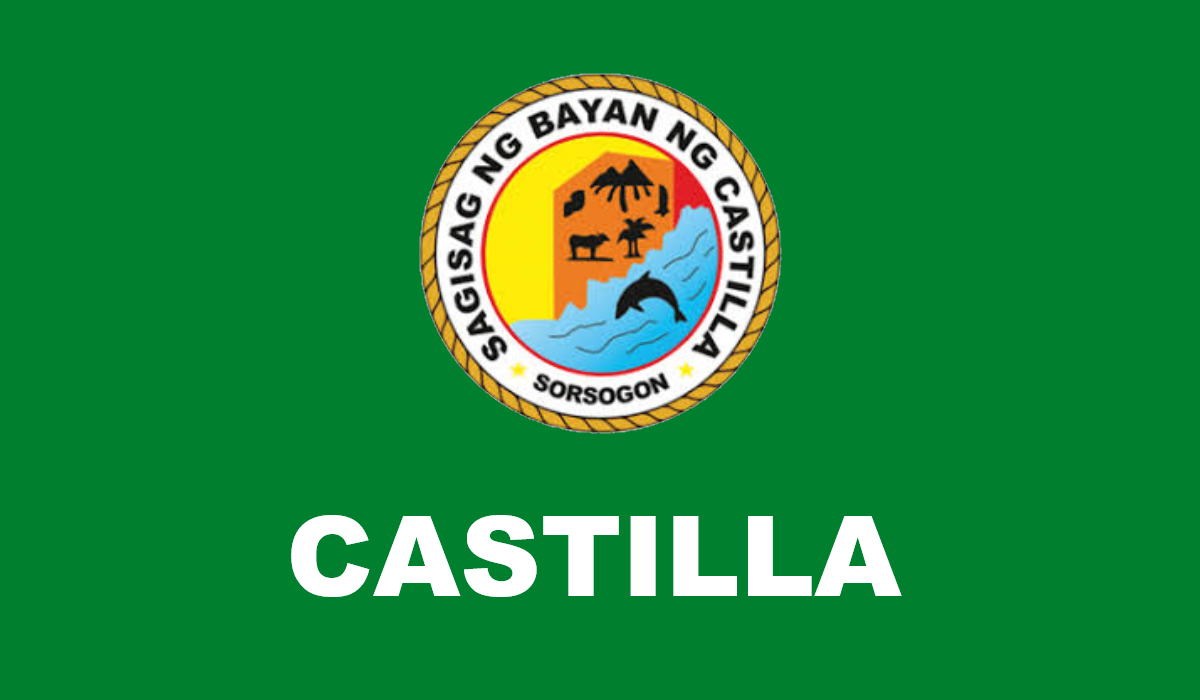
- Flag
- Interactive map of Castilla
- Location within the Philippines
- Coordinates: 12°57′19″N 123°52′35″E
- Country: Philippines
- Region: Bicol Region
- Province: Sorsogon
- District: 1st district
- Named for: Castille, Spain
- Barangays: 34 (see Barangays)

Government
  - Type: Sangguniang Bayan
  - Mayor: Isagani B. Mendoza
  - Vice Mayor: Vicente B. Manata
  - Representative: Dette G. Escudero
  - Municipal Council: Members: Noel D. Hao; Jesus M. Agarap; Erick M. Navas; Salome L. Marantal; Vilma L. Marticio; Elmer O. Mirandilla; Pepito E. Gapido; Eduardo P. Lleva Jr.
  - Electorate: 39,325 voters (2025)

Area
  - Total: 186.20 km^{2} (71.89 sq mi)
- Elevation: 42 m (138 ft)
- Highest elevation: 281 m (922 ft)
- Lowest elevation: 0 m (0 ft)

Population (2024 census)
  - Total: 61,308
  - Density: 329.26/km^{2} (852.78/sq mi)
  - Households: 14,035

Economy
  - Income class: 1st municipal income class
  - Poverty incidence: 37.28% (2023)
  - Revenue: ₱ 279 million (2024)
  - Assets: ₱ 818.4 million (2024)
  - Expenditure: ₱ 259.4 million (2024)
  - Liabilities: ₱ 358 million (2024)

Service provider
  - Electricity: Sorsogon 2 Electric Cooperative (SORECO 2)
- Time zone: UTC+8 (PST)
- ZIP code: 4713
- PSGC: 0506206000
- IDD : area code: +63 (0)56
- Native languages: Central Bikol; Sorsogon language Tagalog
- Website: castillasorsogon.gov.ph

Castilla, officially the Municipality of Castilla, is a municipality in the province of Sorsogon, Philippines. According to the 2024 census, it has a population of 61,308 people.

It is home to Malawmawan Island, a natural attraction situated off the coast of Barangays Buenavista and Macalaya.

== Geography ==
It borders Pilar in the east, Legazpi City and Manito in the north, and Sorsogon City in the east.

=== Barangays ===
Castilla is divided into 34 barangays. Each barangay consists of puroks and some have sitios.

- Amomonting
- Bagalayag
- Bagong Sirang
- Bonga
- Buenavista
- Burabod
- Caburacan
- Canjela
- Cogon
- Cumadcad
- Dangcalan
- Dinapa
- La Union
- Libtong
- Loreto
- Macalaya
- Maracabac
- Mayon
- Milagrosa
- Miluya
- Maypangi
- Monte Carmelo
- Oras
- Pandan
- Poblacion
- Quirapi
- Saclayan
- Salvacion
- San Isidro
- San Rafael
- San Roque
- San Vicente
- Sogoy
- Tomalaytay

=== Climate ===
Climate data for Castilla, Sorsogon
Month	Jan	Feb	Mar	Apr	May	Jun	Jul	Aug	Sep	Oct	Nov	Dec	Year
Mean daily maximum °C (°F)	28 (82)	28 (82)	29 (84)	31 (88)	31 (88)	31 (88)	29 (84)	30 (86)	29 (84)	29 (84)	29 (84)	28 (82)	29 (85)
Mean daily minimum °C (°F)	22 (72)	21 (70)	22 (72)	23 (73)	24 (75)	25 (77)	25 (77)	25 (77)	25 (77)	24 (75)	23 (73)	23 (73)	24 (74)
Average precipitation mm (inches)	65 (2.6)	44 (1.7)	42 (1.7)	39 (1.5)	87 (3.4)	150 (5.9)	184 (7.2)	153 (6.0)	163 (6.4)	154 (6.1)	127 (5.0)	100 (3.9)	1,308 (51.4)
Average rainy days	13.9	9.2	11.0	12.5	19.6	24.3	26.5	25.0	25.5	24.4	19.4	15.1	226.4
Source: Meteoblue (Use with caution: this is modeled/calculated data, not measured locally.)

== Demographics ==
Population census of Castilla
Year	Pop.	±% p.a.
1903	3,831	—
1918	6,380	+3.46%
1939	16,070	+4.50%
1948	17,578	+1.00%
1960	20,007	+1.08%
1970	27,060	+3.06%
1975	29,614	+1.83%
1980	34,782	+3.27%
1990	34,702	−0.02%
1995	40,506	+2.94%
2000	45,072	+2.32%
2007	49,407	+1.27%
2010	52,903	+2.52%
2015	57,827	+1.71%
2020	60,635	+1.00%
2024	61,308	+0.27%
Source: Philippine Statistics Authority

== Economy ==
Poverty incidence of Castilla (%)

Source: Philippine Statistics Authority

Majority of the males (62.02%) falling under working age population were employed while only a little over 10% of the females were employed. Out of the municipality's labor force, majority (52.54%) were not economically active who were either too old, sick, or still at school age. Overall, the total employment rate in Castilla was only 40.95% while unemployment was recorded at 6.50%. This is expected considering that there is inadequate employment opportunity in the municipality.

Total dependency ratio in Castilla was computed at 86.57%, which indicates more mouths to feed for those with gainful employment. Young dependency ratio was computed at 79.97% while old dependency ratio was 6.60%.

Farming and fishing are the main employment opportunities but are characteristically seasoned in nature. Castilla has 13 coastal barangays, which depend on fishing as the main economic activity.

== Education ==
There are two schools district offices which govern all educational institutions within the municipality. They oversee the management and operations of all private and public, from primary to secondary schools. These are the:

- Castilla East Schools District
- Castilla West Schools District

=== Primary and elementary schools ===
- Amomonting Elementary School
- Bagalayag Elementary School
- Bagong Sirang Elementary School
- Bogna Elementary School
- Buenavista Elementary School
- Burabod Elementary School
- Caburacan Elementary School
- Canjela Elementary School
- Castilla East Central School
- Cogon Elementary School
- Cumadcad Central School
- Cyber Culture Academy
- Dancalan Elementary School
- Dinapa Elementary School
- Dulangan Elementary School
- Jesus Cares Christian Academy
- La Union Elementary School
- Libtong Elementary School
- Loreto Elementary School
- Macalaya Elementary School
- Maracabac Elementary School
- Mayon Elementary School
- Maypangi Elementary School
- Milagrosa Elementary School
- Miluya Elementary School
- Minanticaan Elementary School
- Misalay Elementary School
- Monte Carmelo Elementary School
- Oras Elementary School
- Our Lady of the Most Holy Rosary School
- Pandan Elementary School
- Quirapi Elementary School
- Rosal Elementary School
- Saclayan Elementary School
- Salvacion Elementary School
- San Isidro Elementary School
- San Rafael Elementary School
- San Roque Elementary School
- San Vicente Elementary School
- Sogoy Elementary School
- Springhead Christian Academy
- Sto. Nino Elementary School
- Tomalaytay Elementary School

=== Secondary schools ===
- Bagong Sirang High School
- Buenavista National High School
- Castilla National High School
- Cumadcad National High School
- Dinapa National High School
- Jesus Cares Christian Academy (Junior High School)
- Macalaya National High School
- Mayon National High School
- Milagrosa National High School
- Oras National High School
- Pandan High School
- San Rafael High School
