= Roberto Sebastian =

Filipino government official (1944–2012)

Roberto "Bobot" Sison Sebastian

Secretary of Agriculture
- In office June 30, 1992 – June 30, 1996
- President: Fidel V. Ramos
- Preceded by: Senen Bacani
- Succeeded by: Salvador Escudero

Personal details
- Born: May 2, 1944 Manila
- Died: July 23, 2012 (aged 68) Makati
- Resting place: Davao City
- Party: Reporma–LM
- Spouse: Melba Erum Regis
- Children: 3
- Education: Ateneo de Manila University; University of California, Davis
- Occupation: Businessman, entrepreneur, philanthropist

Roberto "Bobot" Sison Sebastian (May 2, 1944 – July 23, 2012) was a Filipino government official and Secretary of the Department of Agriculture.

== Life and career ==
Sebastian was born in Manila, Philippines. He was once a staunch figure in the Philippine banana industry which opened him the opportunity to serve in the Philippine government. He started out with the Philippine Packing Corp. (PPC) and moved to manage the Marsman (MEPI) banana plantations from 1976 to 1992 and from 1996 to 2002 and was the company's president and CEO.

== Personal life ==
He married Melba Erum Regis on August 8, 1970 and has 3 children with her: Rommel Patton Regis Sebastian, June Genevieve Regis Sebastian and Roberto Charles Regis Sebastian, Jr. He has 2 daughters-in-law: Marie Nina Carmen Nasser Carriedo-Sebastian (wife of Rommel) and Maria Veronica Medina-Sebastian (wife of Roberto Jr.). He has 2 grandsons from Roberto Jr. and Maria Veronica: Roberto Nicholas Medina Sebastian and Francisco Ramon Medina Sebastian.

== Political career ==
In 1992, President Fidel V. Ramos picked Sebastian as Department of Agriculture chief who introduced the Key Production Approach (KPA) which became the basis in the formulation of the Medium-Term Agricultural Development Plan (MTADP). The MTADP laid down the foundation for the ascension of the Philippine agriculture to meet the challenge of competing globally.

Sebastian served the Philippine Department of Agriculture from 1992 to 1996. Thereafter, from 1996 to 1997 Mr. Sebastian served as the country’s Special Envoy for Agriculture to the World Trade Organization. He also served as president of various industry groups like the Philippine Banana Growers and Exporters Association (PBGEA), Confederation of Philippine Exporters Foundation, Inc. in Region 11 and Samahang Magsasaging ng Davao, Inc. He was also a member of the Philippine Business for Social Progress, Davao City Chamber of Commerce, Inc. and Rotary Club of Davao.

== Death ==
Sebastian died on Monday, July 23, 2012 at the age of 68 due to a massive heart attack. His remains lie in state at the Heritage Park in Fort Bonifacio, Taguig City until Wednesday, July 25, and will be flown to Davao City on Thursday, July 26. The Department of Agriculture (DA) headed by Secretary Proceso J. Alcala has expressed sorrow: “The Department is saddened for his loss and we wish that his family, relatives, and friends will find solace and strength in his memories. We do share their grief, and our thoughts and prayers continue to be with them as they gradually overcome this moment of grief,” Alcala said in a statement

Political offices
Preceded by Senen Bacani	Secretary of Agriculture; 1992–1996	Succeeded by Salvador Escudero
