= Pilar, Sorsogon =

Municipality in Sorsogon, Philippines

Pilar
- Municipality
- Municipality of Pilar
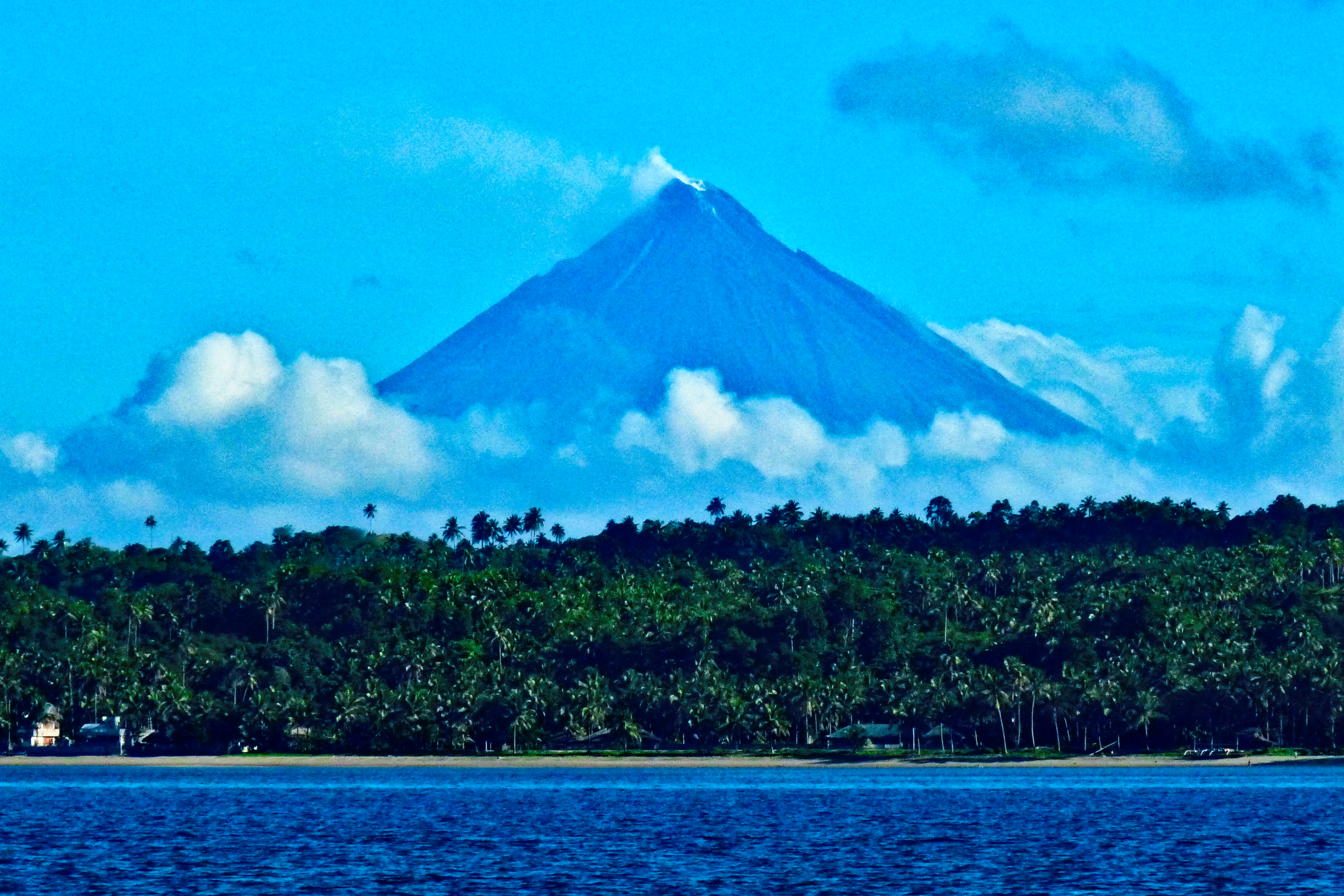
- Mayon Volcano as seen from Pilar

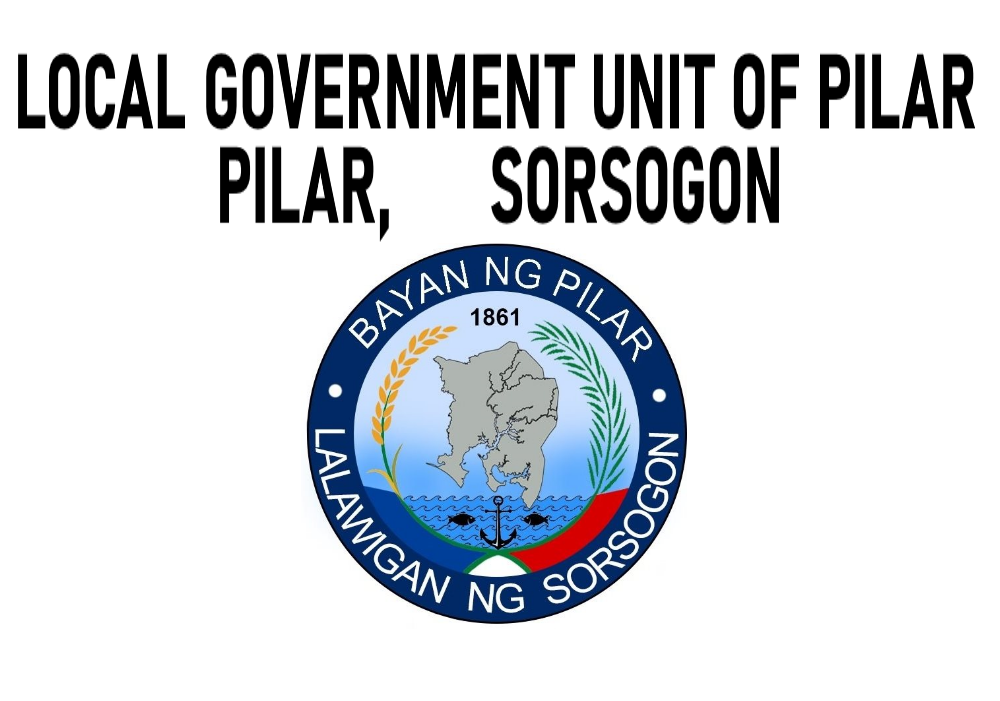
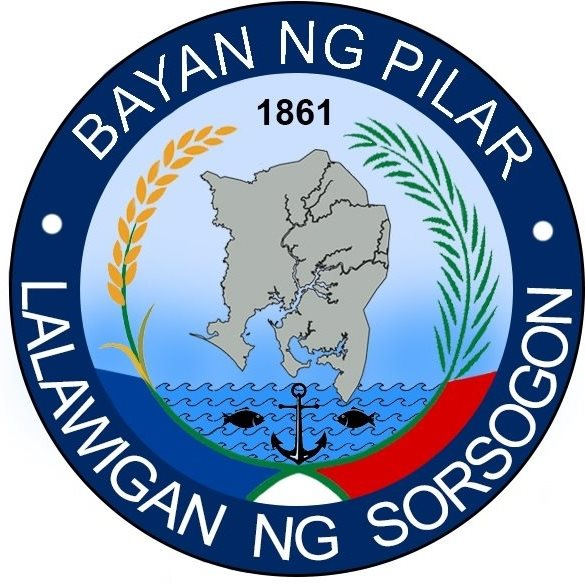
- Flag Seal

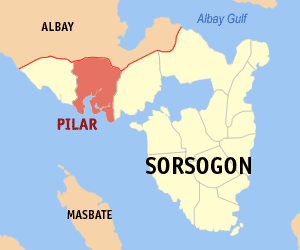
- Map of Sorsogon with Pilar highlighted
- Interactive map of Pilar
- Location within the Philippines
- Coordinates: 12°55′28″N 123°40′32″E
- Country: Philippines
- Region: Bicol Region
- Province: Sorsogon
- District: 1st district
- Founded: August 6, 1861
- Barangays: 49 (see Barangays)

Government
  - Type: Sangguniang Bayan
  - Mayor: Dennis A. Sy-Reyes
  - Vice Mayor: Celso Y. Lao, Jr.
  - Representative: Dette G. Escudero
  - Municipal Council: Members: Rafael P. Siao; Eugene P. Mananes; Liezl A. Millano; Sergio B. Reyes Jr.; Emmanuel H. Sia; Ramon L. Tee; George E. Loseriaga; Lilibeth L. Lao
  - Electorate: 47,491 voters (2025)

Area
  - Total: 248.00 km^{2} (95.75 sq mi)
- Elevation: 17 m (56 ft)
- Highest elevation: 82 m (269 ft)
- Lowest elevation: 0 m (0 ft)

Population (2024 census)
  - Total: 76,908
  - Density: 310.11/km^{2} (803.19/sq mi)
  - Households: 16,669
- Demonym: Pilareño

Economy
  - Income class: 1st municipal income class
  - Poverty incidence: 39.45% (2023)
  - Revenue: ₱ 407.7 million (2024)
  - Assets: ₱ 1,276 million (2024)
  - Expenditure: ₱ 442.7 million (2024)
  - Liabilities: ₱ 495.5 million (2024)

Service provider
  - Electricity: Sorsogon 2 Electric Cooperative (SORECO 2)
- Time zone: UTC+8 (PST)
- ZIP CODE: 4714
- PSGC: 0506213000
- IDD : area code: +63 (0)56
- Native languages: Central Bikol; Sorsogon language Tagalog
- Website: pilarsorsogon.gov.ph

Pilar, officially the Municipality of Pilar, is a municipality in the province of Sorsogon, Philippines. According to the 2024 census, it has a population of 76,908 people.

It is known for its supply of fresh prawns and mud crabs. These seafood products are available throughout the year and form a key part of the town’s local food industry.

== Etymology ==
The town got its name in honor of a newborn Spanish princess named Pilar, the daughter of King Philip and Queen Isabela.

== Geography ==
Pilar is 55 kilometres (34 mi) from Sorsogon City and 560 kilometres (350 mi) from Manila.

=== Barangays ===
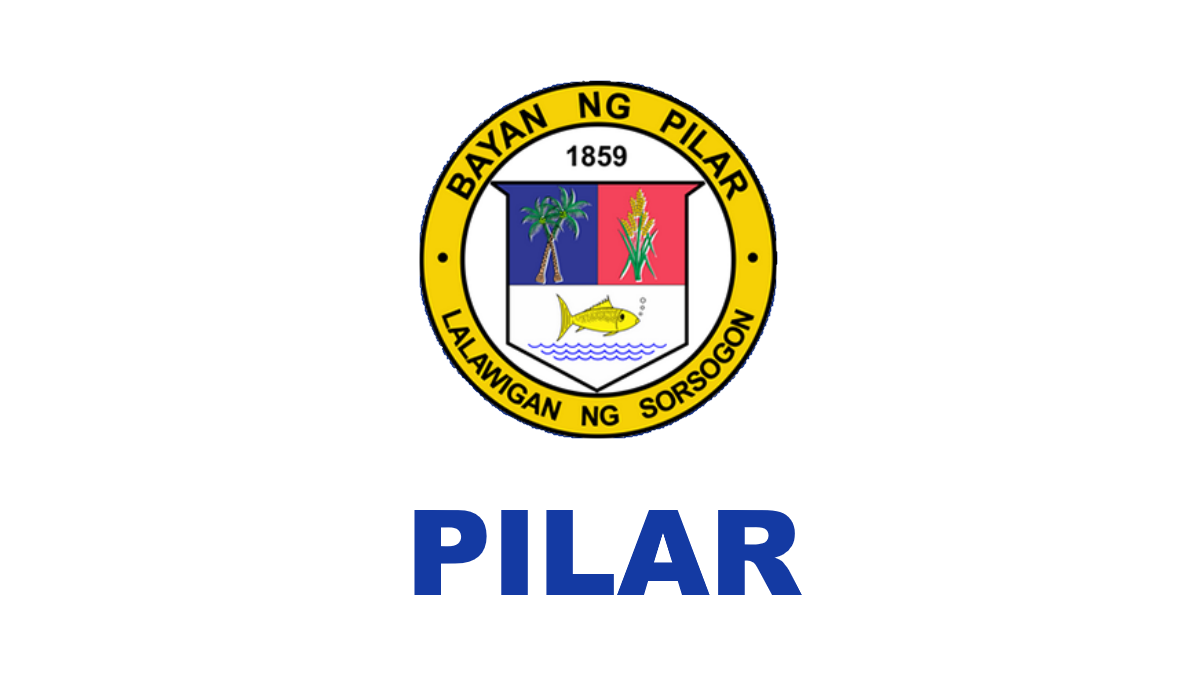
Former flag of Pilar (used until June 12, 2020)

Former seal of Pilar (used until June 12, 2020)

Pilar is politically subdivided into 49 barangays. Each barangay consists of puroks and some have sitios.

In 1957 the sitios of Naspi and Calaguitan were separated from the barrio of Putiao and converted into the barrio of Naspi.

- Abas
- Abucay
- Bantayan
- Banuyo (Poblacion)
- Bayasong
- Bayawas
- Binanuahan (Poblacion)
- Cabiguan
- Cagdongon
- Calongay
- Calpi
- Catamlangan
- Comapo-capo
- Danlog
- Dao (Poblacion)
- Dapdap
- Del Rosario (Bual)
- Esmerada
- Esperanza
- Guiron
- Ginablan
- Inang
- Inapugan
- Leona
- Lipason
- Lourdes
- Lubiano
- Lumbang
- Lungib
- Mabanate
- Malbog
- Marifosque (Poblacion)
- Mercedes
- Migabod
- Naspi
- Palanas
- Pangpang
- Pinagsalog
- Pineda
- Poctol
- Pudo
- Putiao
- Sacnangan
- Salvacion
- San Antonio (Millabas)
- San Antonio (Sapa)
- San Jose
- San Rafael
- Santa Fe

=== Climate ===
Climate data for Pilar, Sorsogon
| Month | Jan | Feb | Mar | Apr | May | Jun | Jul | Aug | Sep | Oct | Nov | Dec | Year |
|---|---|---|---|---|---|---|---|---|---|---|---|---|---|
| Mean daily maximum °C (°F) | 27 (81) | 28 (82) | 29 (84) | 31 (88) | 31 (88) | 30 (86) | 29 (84) | 29 (84) | 29 (84) | 29 (84) | 29 (84) | 28 (82) | 29 (84) |
| Mean daily minimum °C (°F) | 22 (72) | 21 (70) | 22 (72) | 23 (73) | 24 (75) | 25 (77) | 25 (77) | 25 (77) | 25 (77) | 24 (75) | 23 (73) | 23 (73) | 24 (74) |
| Average precipitation mm (inches) | 65 (2.6) | 44 (1.7) | 42 (1.7) | 39 (1.5) | 87 (3.4) | 150 (5.9) | 184 (7.2) | 153 (6.0) | 163 (6.4) | 154 (6.1) | 127 (5.0) | 100 (3.9) | 1,308 (51.4) |
| Average rainy days | 13.9 | 9.2 | 11.0 | 12.5 | 19.6 | 24.3 | 26.5 | 25.0 | 25.5 | 24.4 | 19.4 | 15.1 | 226.4 |
Source: Meteoblue

== Demographics ==
Population census of Pilar
| Year | Pop. | ±% p.a. |
|---|---|---|
| 1903 | 8,018 | — |
| 1918 | 11,845 | +2.64% |
| 1939 | 20,654 | +2.68% |
| 1948 | 25,600 | +2.41% |
| 1960 | 29,756 | +1.26% |
| 1970 | 37,461 | +2.33% |
| 1975 | 42,320 | +2.48% |
| 1980 | 45,579 | +1.49% |
| 1990 | 46,268 | +0.15% |
| 1995 | 51,318 | +1.96% |
| 2000 | 57,898 | +2.62% |
| 2007 | 63,539 | +1.29% |
| 2010 | 68,245 | +2.63% |
| 2015 | 74,564 | +1.70% |
| 2020 | 75,793 | +0.34% |
| 2024 | 76,908 | +0.35% |
Source: Philippine Statistics Authority

== Economy ==
Poverty incidence of Pilar (%)

Source: Philippine Statistics Authority

Pilar's economy is mainly agricultural. Despite efforts on multiplicity, this town is still dependent on the monoculture of coconut.

== Tourism ==
Though whale sharks are more associated with the town of Donsol, whale sharks can also be seen in Pilar Bay near San Antonio. Interaction with the whale sharks is regulated by the local department office. With the help of WWF, strict guidelines were developed to protect the sharks. These include limiting the number of swimmers per boat, no scuba divers and staying further than three meters away from the sharks. In practice, this rule is almost never applied. As many as 14 boats at a time may 'mob' a shark, with up to 30 or 40 swimmers following the shark on the surface. In recent years the number of male sharks has out-numbered female sharks by 20:1. The females that are seen are generally large mature adults in the 7 m ~ 9 m range. Increasing numbers of sharks show propeller marks on their backs. Anecdotal evidence from local fishermen suggests that prop strikes are from fishing boats in the off-season, rather than from tourist boats in the main January–May tourist season.

== Education ==
There are two schools district offices which govern all educational institutions within the municipality. They oversee the management and operations of all private and public, from primary to secondary schools. These are the:

- Pilar I Schools District
- Pilar II Schools District

=== Primary and elementary schools ===
- Abas Elementary School
- Abucay Elementary School
- Bantayan Elementary School
- Banuyo Elementary School
- Bayasong Elementary School
- Bayawas Elementary School
- Binanuahan Elementary School
- Bulabog Elementary School
- Cabiguan Elementary School
- Cagbacong Elementary School
- Cagdongon Elementary School
- Calongay Elementary School
- Calpi Elementary School
- Catamlangan Elementary School
- Comapo-Capo Elementary School
- Danlog Elementary School
- Dapdap Elementary School
- Del Rosario Elementary School
- Dr. Proyecto M. Lumbao Memorial Institute
- Esmerada Elementary School
- Esperanza Elementary School
- Ginablan Elementary School
- Guiron Elementary School
- Inang Elementary School
- Inapugan Elementary School
- Leona Elementary School
- Lipason Elementary School
- Lourdes Elementary School
- Lumbang Elementary School
- Lungib Elementary School
- Mabanate Elementary School
- Malbog Elementary School
- Marifosque Elementary School
- Mercedes Elementary School
- Migabod Elementary School
- Millabas Elementary School
- Naspi Elementary School
- Palanas Elementary School
- Palaypay Elementary School
- Pangpang Elementary School
- Pilar I Central School
- Pilar II Central School
- Pinagsalog Elementary School
- Pineda Elementary School
- Poctol Elementary School
- Provenir Elementary School
- Pudo Elementary School
- Sacnangan Elementary School
- Salvacion Elementary School
- San Antonio Elementary School
- San Jose Elementary School
- San Rafael Elementary School
- Sta. Fe Elementary School
- Tinago Elementary School
- Tingco Elementary School

=== Secondary schools ===
- Abucay National High School
- Bantayan National High School
- Bayasong National High School
- Dominican School of Pilar
- Holy Family Academy
- Lungib National High School
- Manuel T. Sia Memorial High School
- Palanas National High School
- Pilar National Comprehensive High School
- Salvacion National High School
- San Rafael High School
- Tingco National High School
