= Jose Solis =

Filipino politician

Jose Solis (died April 23, 2013) was a Filipino politician, who was a member of the House of Representatives for Sorsogon's 2nd District (2001–2010).
