= Salvador Escudero =

Filipino politician (1942–2012)

Salvador H. Escudero III
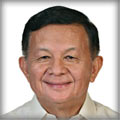
- Official portrait, 2010

Member of the Philippine House of Representatives from Sorsogon's 1st district
- In office June 30, 2007 – August 13, 2012
- Preceded by: Francis Escudero
- Succeeded by: Evelina Escudero
- In office June 30, 1987 – January 31, 1996
- Preceded by: Post established
- Succeeded by: Francis Escudero

Secretary of Agriculture
- In office February 1, 1996 – June 30, 1998
- President: Fidel V. Ramos
- Preceded by: Roberto Sebastian
- Succeeded by: William Dar

Minister of Food and Agriculture
- In office June 30, 1984 – March 25, 1986
- President: Ferdinand Marcos; Corazon Aquino
- Preceded by: Arturo R. Tanco Jr.
- Succeeded by: Ramon Mitra Jr.

Personal details
- Born: Salvador Hatoc Escudero III; December 18, 1942 Casiguran, Sorsogon, Philippine Commonwealth
- Died: August 13, 2012 (aged 69) Quezon City, Philippines
- Party: Liberal (2009–2012)
- Other political affiliations: NPC (1992–2009); KBL (1984–1992)
- Spouse: Evelina Guevara
- Children: 3 (including Francis and Dette)
- Occupation: Politician; veterinarian

Salvador "Sonny" Hatoc Escudero III (December 18, 1942 – August 13, 2012) was a Filipino politician and veterinarian. He was minister of food and agriculture from 1984 to 1986; and Secretary of Agriculture from 1996 to 1998. He was a Member of the House of Representatives from 1987 to 1998; and from 2007 up until his death in 2012.

An education advocate, Escudero is credited as the author of the laws that established the Commission on Higher Education (CHED) and the Technical Education and Skills Development Authority (TESDA). He is the father of Senate President Francis Escudero.

== Early life ==
Salvador Hatoc Escudero III was born on December 18, 1942 in Casiguran, Sorsogon. Sonny was the third-generation politician of the Escudero clan. His father, Antonio F. Escudero served as mayor of Casiguran and provincial board member. His grandfather, Salvador C. Escudero Sr., was a former councilor, mayor, provincial board member, and Governor of Sorsogon and was the son of a Spaniard, Don Manuel Escudero y Borrás from Santander, Spain.

== Career ==
- Director of UP Veterinary Hospital (1968-1969)
- Dean and Professor of College of Veterinary Medicine, University of the Philippines, Los Baños, Laguna (1970-1984)
- Director of Bureau of Animal Industry (1975-1984)
- Assistant Minister of the Ministry of Food and Agriculture (1980-1984)
- Minister of Ministry of Food and Agriculture (1984-1986)
- Representative of Batasang Pambansa (1984-1986)
- Secretary of Agriculture (1984-1986, Marcos administration; 1996–1998, Ramos administration)
- Representative of 1st District of Sorsogon (30 June 1987 – 31 January 1996; 30 June 2007 – 13 August 2012)
- Host of radio program Karambola (2005-2012)

In February 1987, Escudero was recruited to the Eva Estrada Kalaw-led wing of the Liberal Party, and was listed as one of the faction's six nominees for the Senate election in May. On February 28, Escudero was also nominated by the Kilusang Bagong Lipunan as one of its senatorial candidates. However, Escudero would later decide to run instead for the congressional seat of Sorsogon's first district, with his 17-year-old son Francis assisting in logistics; Escudero won the seat over former acting governor Elizalde Diaz and Augusto Ortiz.

== Personal life ==
Escudero was married to educator Evelina B. Guevara and had three children with her. His son, Francis "Chiz" Escudero, is a lawyer and politician who served as president of the Senate from 2024 to 2025, having been a senator since 2022 and previously from 2007 to 2019. Chiz has also served as representative of Sorsogon's 1st district and governor of Sorsogon. His daughter, Dette Escudero, is also a politician, serving as the deputy majority leader of the House of Representatives since 2025 and the incumbent representative of Sorsogon's 1st district since 2022.

Actor Martin Escudero is his grandson.

== Education ==
=== College ===
- Veterinary Medicine - University of the Philippines Diliman Quezon City (1963)

=== Higher studies ===
- Tropical Veterinary Medicine - University of Queensland, Australia (1968)
- Organization and Management - University of the Philippines (1969)

== Death ==
Escudero died of colon cancer in 2012. He was 69 years old.

House of Representatives of the Philippines
| Preceded by Chiz Escudero | Member of the House of Representatives from Sorsogon's 1st district 2007–2012; 1987–1996 | Succeeded by Evelina Escudero |
| Recreated Title last held by Salvador R. Encinas | Member of the House of Representatives from Sorsogon's 1st district 2007–2012; 1987–1996 | Succeeded by Chiz Escudero |
Political offices
| Preceded by Roberto Sebastian | Secretary of Agriculture; 1996–1998 | Succeeded by William Dar |
