= Santa Magdalena =

Municipality in Sorsogon, Philippines

Santa Magdalena Busaingan
- Municipality
- Municipality of Santa Magdalena
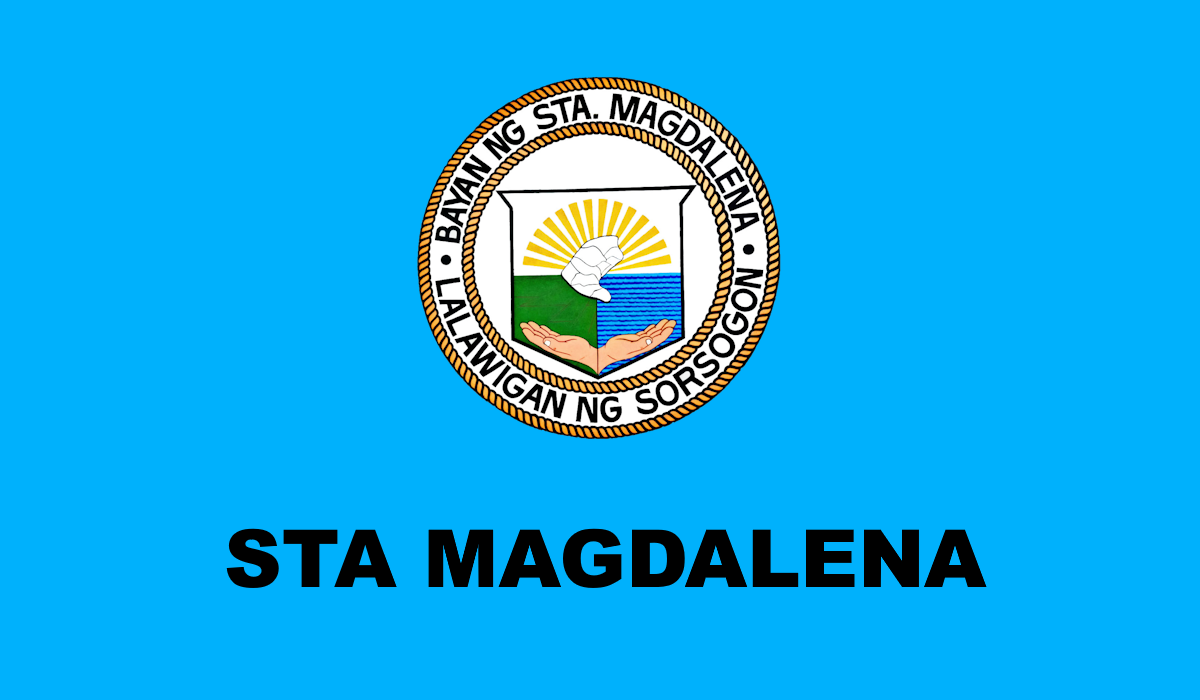
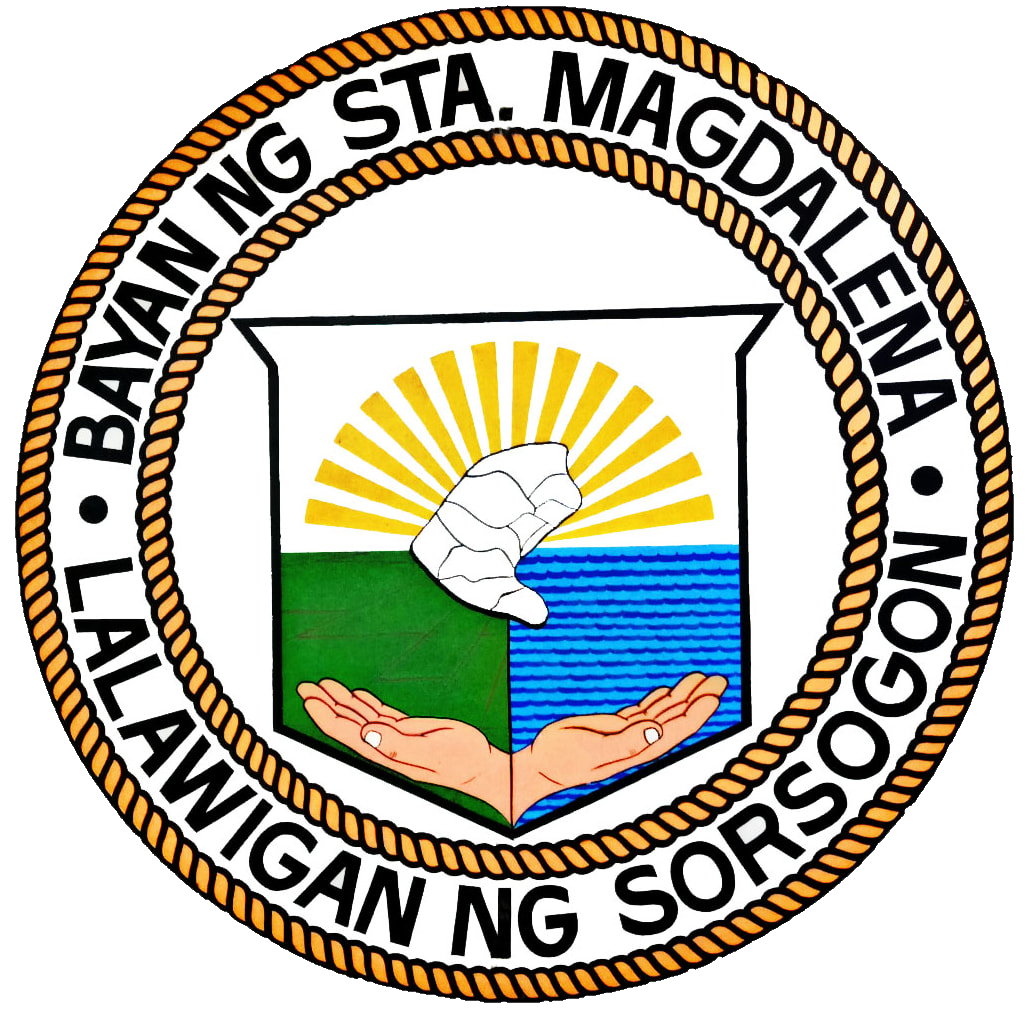
- Flag Seal

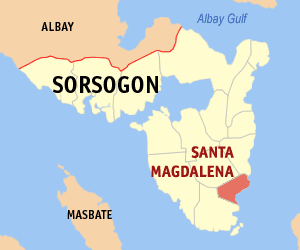
- Map of Sorsogon with Santa Magdalena highlighted
- Interactive map of Santa Magdalena
- Location within the Philippines
- Coordinates: 12°38′56″N 124°06′30″E
- Country: Philippines
- Region: Bicol Region
- Province: Sorsogon
- District: 2nd district
- Barangays: 14 (see Barangays)

Government
  - Type: Sangguniang Bayan
  - Mayor: Mark Jewery G. Lozano
  - Vice Mayor: Norbie F. Forte
  - Representative: Manuel “Wowo” L. Fortes, Sorsogon 2nd District Representative
  - Municipal Council: Members: Gina F. Correa; Arlene E. Lozano-Forte; Elaine F. Gapayao; Noel C. Agripa; Antonio G. Frilles; Natalio T. Gaton Jr.; Joven F. Furio; Salvador B. Jordan
  - Electorate: 12,729 voters (2025)

Area
  - Total: 43.50 km^{2} (16.80 sq mi)
- Elevation: 62 m (203 ft)
- Highest elevation: 630 m (2,070 ft)
- Lowest elevation: 0 m (0 ft)

Population (2024 census)
  - Total: 17,400
  - Density: 400/km^{2} (1,040/sq mi)
  - Households: 3,962

Economy
  - Income class: 4th municipal income class
  - Poverty incidence: 40.52% (2023)
  - Revenue: ₱ 106.3 million (2024)
  - Assets: ₱ 236 million (2024)
  - Expenditure: ₱ 94.25 million (2024)
  - Liabilities: ₱ 17.08 million (2024)

Service provider
  - Electricity: Sorsogon 1 Electric Cooperative (SORECO 1)
- Time zone: UTC+8 (PST)
- ZIP code: 4709
- PSGC: 0506215000
- IDD : area code: +63 (0)56
- Native languages: Sorsogon language Tagalog

Santa Magdalena, officially the Municipality of Santa Magdalena (Waray Sorsogon: Bungto san Santa Magdalena; Waray: Bungto han Santa Magdalena, Tagalog: Bayan ng Santa Magdalena), is a municipality in the province of Sorsogon, Philippines. According to the 2024 census, it has a population of 17,400 people.

== History ==
On April 15, 2001, former three-term mayor Felix Frayna was running against incumbent mayor Nida Gamos when he was assassinated by two suspected communist rebels in Barangay San Eugenio while giving a speech on a make-shift platform.

== Geography ==
It is bounded by Bulusan, Matnog and Irosin. It is the smallest municipality in the province, both in population and area. The territorial jurisdiction of the municipality comprises some 4706.443 hectares of land mass and areas of sea territory.

The local government unit is administratively subdivided into 14 barangays, dispersed geographically in the lowlands of Poblacion (4 barangays) and upland (10 barangays). It has 12 coastal barangays and 2 inland barangays (Salvacion and La Esperanza).

=== Barangays ===
Santa Magdalena is politically subdivided into 14 barangays. Each barangay consists of puroks and some have sitios.

- Barangay I Poblacion (San Francisco)
- Barangay II Poblacion (Mother of Perpetual Help)
- Barangay III Poblacion (Del Rosario)
- Barangay IV Poblacion (Santo Niño)
- La Esperanza (Manangkas)
- Peñafrancia (Uson)
- Salvacion (Taberna)
- San Antonio (Kaburihan)
- San Bartolome (Talaongan)
- San Eugenio (Alig-igan)
- San Isidro (Bilaoyon)
- San Rafael (Bil-og)
- San Roque (Alamre)
- San Sebastian (Bigo)

=== Climate ===
Climate data for Santa Magdalena, Sorsogon
Month	Jan	Feb	Mar	Apr	May	Jun	Jul	Aug	Sep	Oct	Nov	Dec	Year
Mean daily maximum °C (°F)	27 (81)	28 (82)	29 (84)	31 (88)	31 (88)	30 (86)	29 (84)	29 (84)	29 (84)	29 (84)	29 (84)	28 (82)	29 (84)
Mean daily minimum °C (°F)	22 (72)	21 (70)	22 (72)	23 (73)	24 (75)	25 (77)	25 (77)	25 (77)	25 (77)	24 (75)	23 (73)	23 (73)	24 (74)
Average precipitation mm (inches)	65 (2.6)	44 (1.7)	42 (1.7)	39 (1.5)	87 (3.4)	150 (5.9)	184 (7.2)	153 (6.0)	163 (6.4)	154 (6.1)	127 (5.0)	100 (3.9)	1,308 (51.4)
Average rainy days	13.9	9.2	11.0	12.5	19.6	24.3	26.5	25.0	25.5	24.4	19.4	15.1	226.4
Source: Meteoblue

== Demographics ==
Population census of Santa Magdalena
Year	Pop.	±% p.a.
1903	2,335	—
1918	3,747	+3.20%
1939	6,339	+2.54%
1948	8,098	+2.76%
1960	14,259	+4.83%
1970	11,489	−2.13%
1975	10,887	−1.07%
1980	13,121	+3.80%
1990	12,274	−0.67%
1995	13,900	+2.36%
2000	14,623	+1.09%
2007	15,425	+0.74%
2010	16,520	+2.53%
2015	16,848	+0.38%
2020	17,096	+0.31%
2024	17,400	+0.42%
Source: Philippine Statistics Authority

== Economy ==
Poverty incidence of Santa Magdalena (%)

Source: Philippine Statistics Authority

== Education ==
The Santa Magdalena Schools District Office governs all educational institutions within the municipality. It oversees the management and operations of all private and public, from primary to secondary schools.

=== Primary and elementary schools ===
- Alig-igan Elementary School
- Bigo Elementary School
- Bilaoyon Elementary School
- Manangkas Elementary School
- Salvacion Elementary School
- San Antonio Elementary School
- San Rafael Elementary School
- San Sebastian Elementary School
- Sta. Magdalena Central School
- Talaonga Elementary School
- Uson Elementary School

=== Secondary schools ===
- Santa Magdalena Central School
- Santa Magdalena National High School
- Talaonga National High School
