= Prieto Diaz =

Municipality in Sorsogon, Philippines

Prieto Diaz Montufar
- Municipality
- Municipality of Prieto Diaz
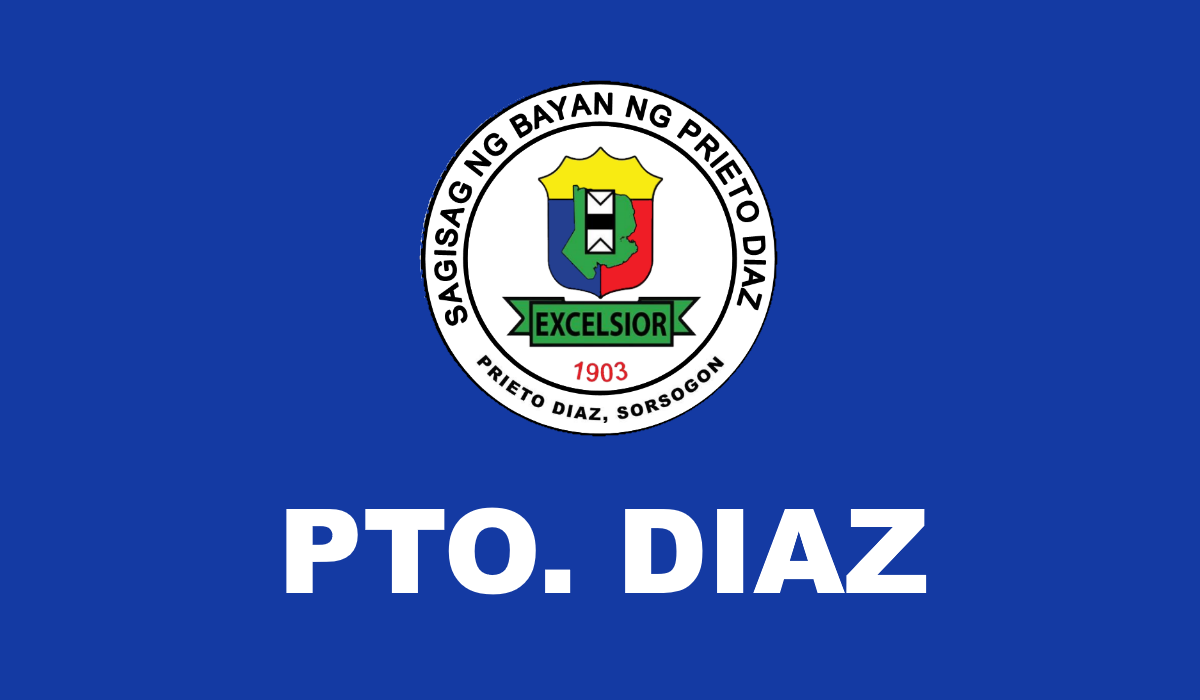
- Flag

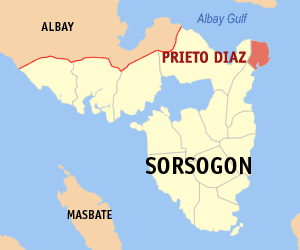
- Map of Sorsogon with Prieto Diaz highlighted
- Interactive map of Prieto Diaz
- Location within the Philippines
- Coordinates: 13°02′27″N 124°11′35″E
- Country: Philippines
- Region: Bicol Region
- Province: Sorsogon
- District: 2nd district
- Named for: Fathers Gabriel Prieto and Severino Diaz
- Barangays: 23 (see Barangays)

Government
  - Type: Sangguniang Bayan
  - Mayor: Benito L. Doma
  - Vice mayor: Romeo D. Domasian
  - Representative: Vacant
  - Municipal Council: Members: Vicente B. Bayoca; Avon D. Domalaon; Bienvenido D. Ayo; Florante D. Detecio; Albert D. Destura; Joseph H. Yap Jr.; Rodolfo D. Uy; Edwin B. Destajo
  - Electorate: 16,379 voters (2025)

Area
  - Total: 49.07 km^{2} (18.95 sq mi)
- Elevation: 9.0 m (29.5 ft)
- Highest elevation: 136 m (446 ft)
- Lowest elevation: −1 m (−3.3 ft)

Population (2024 census)
  - Total: 23,424
  - Density: 477.4/km^{2} (1,236/sq mi)
  - Households: 5,346

Economy
  - Income class: 4th municipal income class
  - Poverty incidence: 37.08% (2023)
  - Revenue: ₱ 123 million (2024)
  - Assets: ₱ 428 million (2024)
  - Expenditure: ₱ 124.3 million (2024)
  - Liabilities: ₱ 64.27 million (2024)

Service provider
  - Electricity: Sorsogon 2 Electric Cooperative (SORECO 2)
- Time zone: UTC+8 (PST)
- ZIP code: 4711
- PSGC: 0506214000
- IDD : area code: +63 (0)56
- Native languages: Sorsogon Ayta; Sorsogon language Central Bikol; Tagalog

Prieto Diaz, officially the Municipality of Prieto Diaz, is a municipality in the Philippine province of Sorsogon. According to the 2024 census, it had a population of 23,424 people.

== Etymology ==
Prieto Diaz got its name from two Bicolano martyrs, Gabriel Prieto and Severino Diaz.

== History ==
The town of Prieto Diaz was once a Visita of the old municipality of Bacon (now Bacon District of Sorsogon City). The town was given its present name from the surnames of the two Bicolano martyrs, Father Gabriel Prieto (1853–1897) and Father Severino Diaz (1862–1897), when it became independent from the municipality of Bacon, on October 12, 1903, by virtue of Act 940 of the Philippine Commission. Prieto Diaz was the only town organized after Sorsogon became a province, on October 17, 1894.

== Geography ==
Prieto Diaz is 387 km (241 mi) southeast of Manila, 150 km(31m) east-southeast of Legazpi City, the regional center, and 20 km (12.4 mi) north-northeast of Sorsogon City, the provincial capital. North of Prieto Diaz, across Albay Gulf, is Rapu-Rapu, in the west is Bacon District of Sorsogon City, and in the south is Gubat, while the Pacific Ocean is on the east. It is also the easternmost point on the island of Luzon.

=== Barangays ===
Prieto Diaz is politically subdivided into 23 barangays. Each barangay consists of puroks, and some have sitios.

In 1954, the sitio of Carayat was converted into a barrio.

- Brillante (Poblacion)
- Bulawan
- Calao
- Carayat
- Diamante
- Gogon
- Lupi
- Manlabong
- Maningcay De Oro
- Perlas
- Quidolog
- Rizal
- San Antonio
- San Fernando
- San Isidro
- San Juan
- San Rafael
- San Ramon
- Santa Lourdes
- Santo Domingo
- Talisayan
- Tupaz
- Ulag

=== Climate ===
Climate data for Prieto Diaz, Sorsogon
Month	Jan	Feb	Mar	Apr	May	Jun	Jul	Aug	Sep	Oct	Nov	Dec	Year
Mean daily maximum °C (°F)	27 (81)	28 (82)	29 (84)	31 (88)	31 (88)	30 (86)	29 (84)	29 (84)	29 (84)	29 (84)	29 (84)	28 (82)	29 (84)
Mean daily minimum °C (°F)	22 (72)	21 (70)	22 (72)	23 (73)	24 (75)	25 (77)	25 (77)	25 (77)	25 (77)	24 (75)	23 (73)	23 (73)	24 (74)
Average precipitation mm (inches)	65 (2.6)	44 (1.7)	42 (1.7)	39 (1.5)	87 (3.4)	150 (5.9)	184 (7.2)	153 (6.0)	163 (6.4)	154 (6.1)	127 (5.0)	100 (3.9)	1,308 (51.4)
Average rainy days	13.9	9.2	11.0	12.5	19.6	24.3	26.5	25.0	25.5	24.4	19.4	15.1	226.4
Source: Meteoblue

Prieto Diaz has a tropical climate, with significant rainfall throughout the year, even during the driest month. According to Köppen and Geiger, the climate in Prieto Diaz is classified as Af; the average annual temperature is 27.1 °C; and the average annual rainfall is 2965 mm. The driest month is April, with 119 mm. Most precipitation falls in December, with an average of 514 mm. The warmest month of the year is June, with an average temperature of 28.2 °C. In January, the average temperature is 25.6 °C, the lowest average temperature of the whole year. The difference in precipitation between the driest and wettest months is 395 mm. The average temperatures vary during the year by 2.6 °C.

Typhoons are especially frequent, and they are destructive menaces in Bicol Region. The months of September, October, and November experience the most destruction. Forty percent of storms carrying high-velocity winds in the Philippines pass through the southeastern part of Luzon, where Prieto Diaz is located.

== Demographics ==
Population census of Prieto Diaz
Year	Pop.	±% p.a.
1918	4,867	—
1939	7,480	+2.07%
1948	8,169	+0.98%
1960	10,407	+2.04%
1970	13,625	+2.73%
1975	14,006	+0.55%
1980	15,603	+2.18%
1990	15,324	−0.18%
1995	18,106	+3.18%
2000	18,925	+0.95%
2007	19,762	+0.60%
2010	20,478	+1.30%
2015	22,442	+1.76%
2020	22,644	+0.19%
Source: Philippine Statistics Authority

=== Sorsogon Ayta Language ===
In 2010, UNESCO released its third volume of Endangered Languages in the World, with three critically endangered languages being in the Philippines. One of these is Southern Ayta (Sorsogon Ayta), which had 150 estimated speakers in 2000. The language was classified as "Critically Endangered", meaning the youngest speakers are grandparents and older, and they speak the language partially and infrequently and hardly pass it to their children and grandchildren.

The Sorsogon Ayta people live only in the municipality of Prieto Diaz; they are one of the original Negrito settlers of the Philippines. They belong to the Aeta people classification but have distinct language and belief systems unique to their own culture and heritage.

== Economy ==
Poverty incidence of Prieto Diaz (%)

Source: Philippine Statistics Authority

== Education ==
The Prieto Diaz school district office governs all educational institutions within the municipality. It oversees the management and operations of all private and public schools, from primary to secondary.

Prieto Diaz had 19 elementary and 4 secondary schools as of 2021

=== Primary and elementary schools ===
- Bulawan Elementary School
- Calao Elementary School
- Carayat Elementary School
- Gogon Elementary School
- Lupi Elementary School
- Manlabong Elementary School
- Nenita E. Oandasan Memorial School
- Prieto Diaz Central School
- Quidolog Elementary School
- San Antonio Elementary School
- San Fernando Elementary School
- San Isidro Elementary School
- San Juan Elementary School
- San Rafael Elementary School
- San Ramon Elementary School
- Santa Lourdes Elementary School
- Santo Domingo Primary School
- Talisayan Elementary School
- Ulag Elementary School

=== Secondary schools ===
- Calao National High School
- Manlabong National High School
- Prieto Diaz National High School
- San Rafael Integrated School
