= Donsol =

Municipality in Sorsogon, Philippines

- Municipality
- Municipality of Donsol
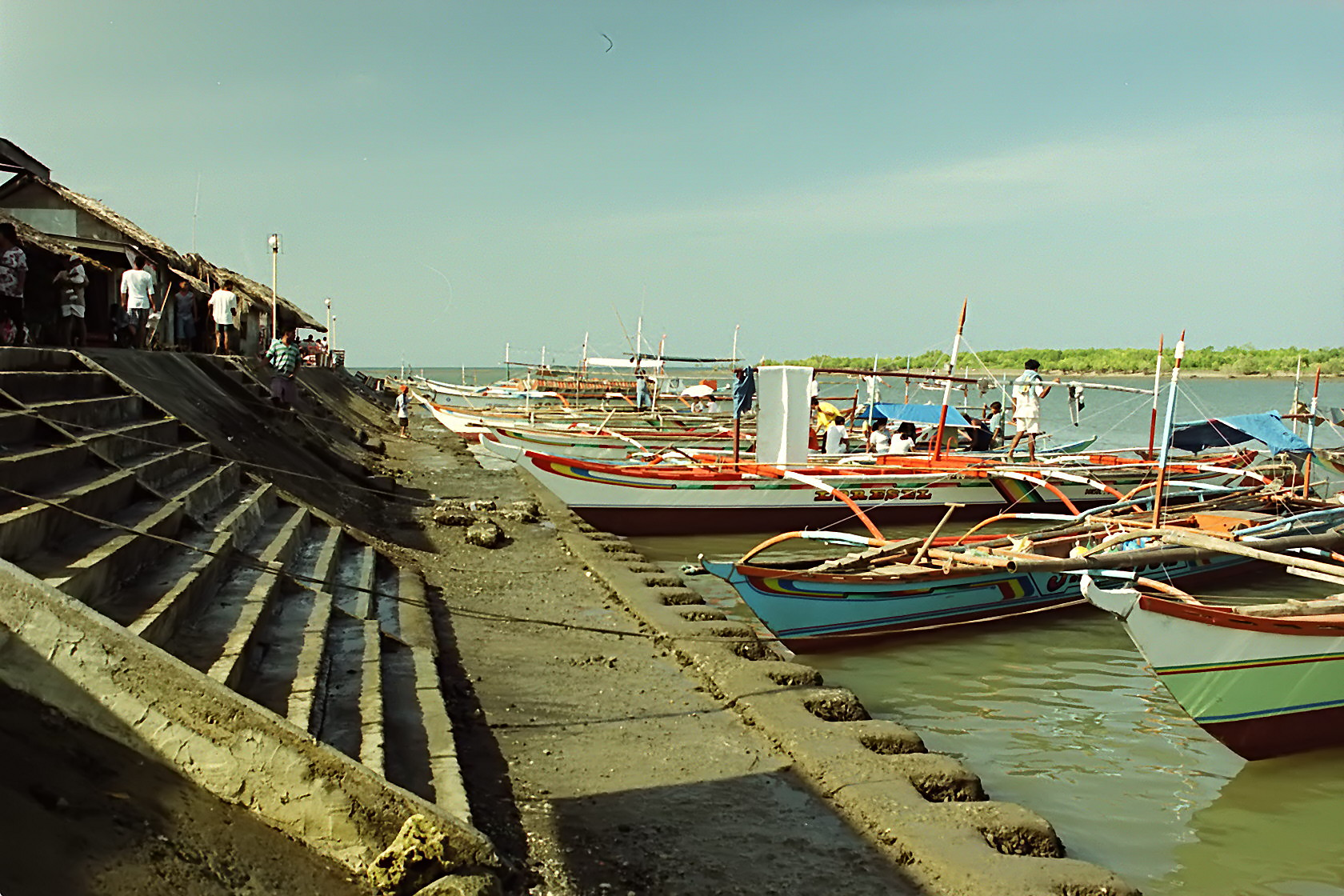
- Port of Donsol

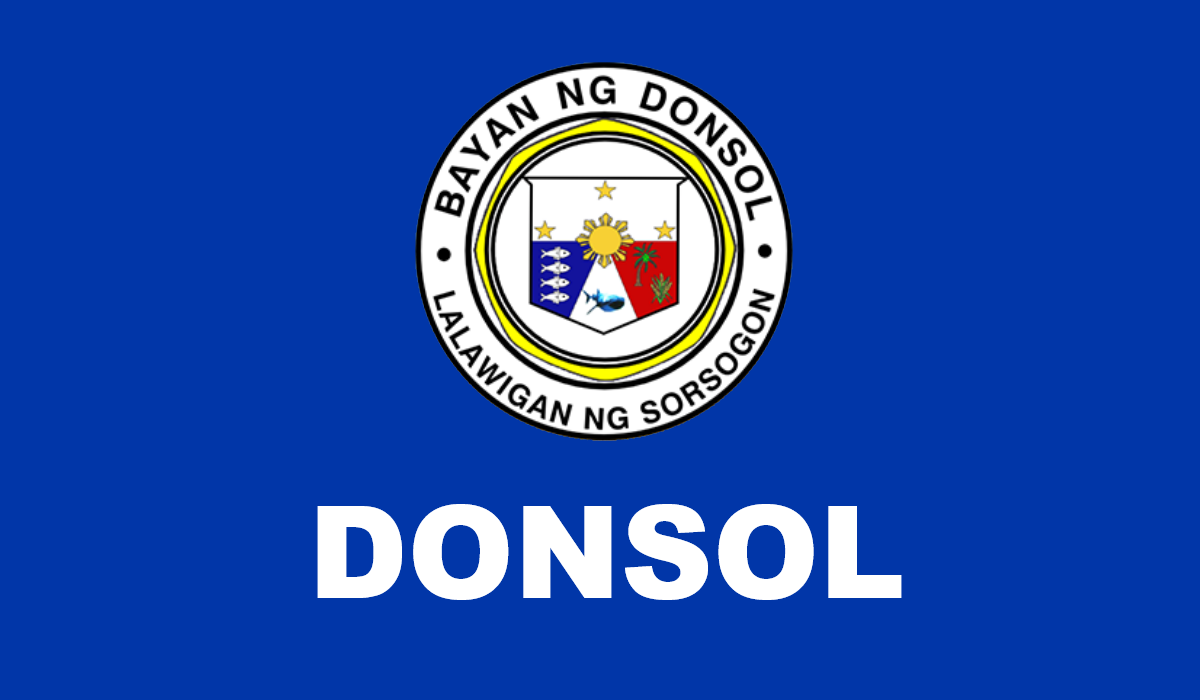
- Flag Seal
- Nickname: Whale Shark Tourism Capital of the Philippines
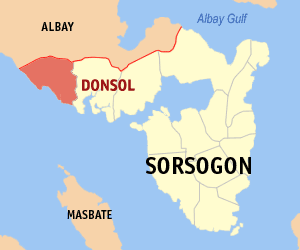
- Map of Sorsogon with Donsol highlighted
- Interactive map of Donsol
- Location within the Philippines
- Coordinates: 12°54′30″N 123°35′53″E
- Country: Philippines
- Region: Bicol Region
- Province: Sorsogon
- District: 1st district
- Founded: 1668
- Barangays: 51 (see Barangays)

Government
  - Type: Sangguniang Bayan
  - Mayor: Ralph Walter Lubiano
  - Vice Mayor: Ma. Christiana R. Abetria
  - Representative: Dette Escudero
  - Municipal Council: Members: Ma. Christiana R. Abetria; Teodoro B. de Guzman; Nicolas A. Nato; Mary Antoinette G. Aquino; Helene A. Garay; Argel D. Hernandez; Jerome R. Alcantara II; Victor V. Alim
  - Electorate: 32,811 voters (2025)

Area
  - Total: 156.20 km^{2} (60.31 sq mi)
- Elevation: 13 m (43 ft)
- Highest elevation: 84 m (276 ft)
- Lowest elevation: 0 m (0 ft)

Population (2024 census)
  - Total: 51,781
  - Density: 331.50/km^{2} (858.59/sq mi)
  - Households: 11,262
- Demonym: Donsolanon

Economy
  - Income class: 1st municipal income class
  - Poverty incidence: 39.18% (2023)
  - Revenue: ₱ 290.7 million (2024)
  - Assets: ₱ 948.7 million (2024)
  - Expenditure: ₱ 275.4 million (2024)
  - Liabilities: ₱ 287 million (2024)

Service provider
  - Electricity: Sorsogon 2 Electric Cooperative (SORECO 2)
- Time zone: UTC+8 (PST)
- ZIP code: 4715
- PSGC: 0506207000
- IDD : area code: +63 (0)56
- Native languages: East Miraya; Tagalog

Donsol, officially the Municipality of Donsol, (Central Bikol: Banwaan kan Donsol; Tagalog: Bayan ng Donsol) is a municipality in the province of Sorsogon, Philippines. According to the 2024 census, it has a population of 51,781 people.

It is known for whale shark encounters and its rich marine biodiversity, offering activities like snorkeling, diving, and wildlife exploration.

== Geography ==
Donsol is 66 kilometres (41 mi) from Sorsogon City, 571 kilometres (355 mi) from Manila, and 94 kilometres (58 mi) from Legazpi.

=== Barangays ===
Donsol is politically subdivided into 51 barangays. Each barangay consists of puroks and some have sitios.

- Alin
- Awaii (Poblacion)
- Banban
- Bandi
- Banuang Gurang
- Baras
- Bayawas
- Bororan Barangay 1 (Poblacion)
- Cabugao
- Central Barangay 2 (Poblacion)
- Cristo
- Dancalan
- De Vera
- Gimagaan
- Girawan
- Gogon
- Gura
- Juan Adre
- Lourdes
- Mabini
- Malapoc
- Malinao
- Market Site Barangay 3 (Poblacion)
- New Maguisa
- Ogod (Crossing)
- Old Maguisa
- Orange
- Pangpang
- Parina
- Pawala
- Pinamanaan
- Poso Pob. (Barangay 5)
- Punta Waling-Waling Dalisay (Poblacion)
- Rawis (Poblacion Brgy)
- San Antonio
- San Isidro
- San Jose
- San Rafael
- San Ramon
- San Vicente
- Santa Cruz (Itunggan)
- Sevilla
- Sibago
- Suguian
- Tagbac
- Tinanogan
- Tongdol
- Tres Marias (Poblacion Brgy)
- Tuba
- Tupas
- Vinisitahan

=== Demographics ===
Population census of Donsol
Year	Pop.	±% p.a.
1903	6,685	—
1918	10,656	+3.16%
1939	18,050	+2.54%
1948	20,681	+1.52%
1960	23,703	+1.14%
1970	30,548	+2.57%
1975	32,310	+1.13%
1980	33,785	+0.90%
1990	33,159	−0.19%
1995	36,013	+1.56%
2000	39,995	+2.27%
2007	43,996	+1.32%
2010	47,563	+2.88%
2015	49,711	+0.84%
2020	50,281	+0.24%
2024	51,781	+0.71%
Source: Philippine Statistics Authority

=== Language ===
The majority of the population speak Eastern Miraya, an Albay Bikol language of Inland Bikol group of languages. The language is also spoken in four towns of Albay and some parts of Pilar and Castilla, Sorsogon. It is mutually intelligible with Western Miraya. People of Donsol can also speak and understand Tagalog or Filipino, the national language, and English.

=== Climate ===
Climate data for Donsol, Sorsogon
Month	Jan	Feb	Mar	Apr	May	Jun	Jul	Aug	Sep	Oct	Nov	Dec	Year
Mean daily maximum °C (°F)	27 (81)	28 (82)	29 (84)	31 (88)	31 (88)	30 (86)	29 (84)	29 (84)	29 (84)	29 (84)	29 (84)	28 (82)	29 (84)
Mean daily minimum °C (°F)	22 (72)	21 (70)	22 (72)	23 (73)	24 (75)	25 (77)	25 (77)	25 (77)	25 (77)	24 (75)	23 (73)	23 (73)	24 (74)
Average precipitation mm (inches)	65 (2.6)	44 (1.7)	42 (1.7)	39 (1.5)	87 (3.4)	150 (5.9)	184 (7.2)	153 (6.0)	163 (6.4)	154 (6.1)	127 (5.0)	100 (3.9)	1,308 (51.4)
Average rainy days	13.9	9.2	11.0	12.5	19.6	24.3	26.5	25.0	25.5	24.4	19.4	15.1	226.4
Source: Meteoblue

== Religion ==
The majority of the people adhere to Catholicism and each barangay has a patron saint and fiestas are held annually. Iglesia ni Cristo is the second largest religion of the population and has several local congregations in the municipality.

== Economy ==
Poverty incidence of Donsol (%)

Source: Philippine Statistics Authority

== Tourism ==
=== Whale shark viewing ===
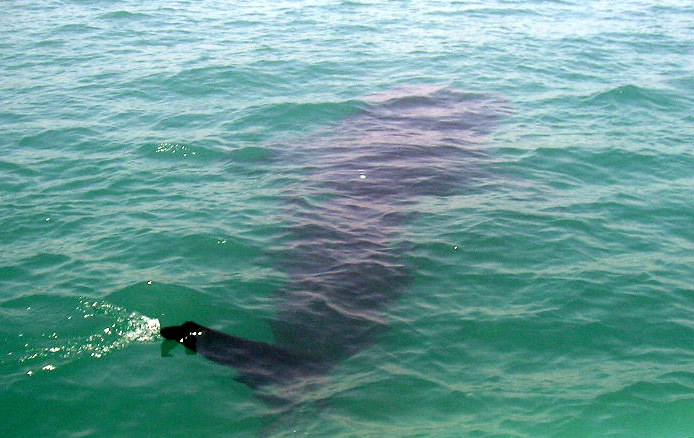
Butanding whale shark in Donsol, Sorsogon

Swimming with whale sharks, locally known as butanding, was featured as the Best Animal Encounter in Asia by Time magazine in 2004. Whale sharks can be seen between November and June, with presence peaking between February and May.

For over a century, Donsol residents believed whale sharks were dangerous. These gentle giants, *Rhincodon typus*, were misunderstood until December 26, 1997, when diving instructor Romir Aglugub and his group encountered them peacefully while scuba diving. At first, Aglugub's fellow divers doubted the gentle nature of whale sharks. However, after swimming with them, they observed their calm behavior. Their experience, documented on video and shared with the media and WWF-Philippines, helped dispel myths and initiated scientific research in Donsol. By 1998, whale sharks became symbols of Donsol’s natural heritage and earned it the title “Whale Shark Capital of the World.” This shift spurred eco-tourism and highlighted the value of education in marine conservation, thanks to Aglugub's efforts.

Interaction with the whale sharks is regulated by the local Department of Tourism (DOT) office. WWF guidelines are generally observed to protect the sharks. Rules include limiting the number of swimmers per boat to six, prohibiting scuba divers, and requiring staying farther than three meters from the sharks.

In recent years the number of male sharks has out-numbered female sharks by 20:1. Generally, the females that are seen are large mature adults in the 7m ~ 9m range. Increasing numbers of sharks show propeller marks on their backs. Anecdotal evidence from local fishermen suggests that prop strikes are from fishing boats in the off-season, rather than from tourist boats during the main February–June tourist season.

In 2006 five sharks were found dead on the surface of the water, within 30 miles of Donsol. They had all been shot at close range. One shark had 13 bullet wounds to the head. The locals blame this on commercial fishermen shooting the sharks if they are caught in their nets. Manta rays, which are also protected in the Philippines, are also over-fished and sold in local markets in the Sorsogon area.

Groups from Singapore, Hong Kong, Taiwan, and the Philippines make up the largest groups of visitors. Most tourists book guided tours with dive centers familiar with whale shark interaction.

=== Other attractions ===
Donsol has a night firefly tour and shrimp-catching night tour available all-year round. Donsol also is becoming the best jump-off and base for divers to the Manta Bowl and San Miguel Island in Ticao due to the existence of better tourist facilities. Diving in Donsol itself is not allowed. Donsol also is a trekking and biking site, due mainly to the abundance of hilly areas and fields.

== Education ==
There are two schools district offices which govern all educational institutions within the municipality. They oversee the management and operations of all private and public, from primary to secondary schools. These are the:

- Donsol East Schools District
- Donsol West Schools District

=== Primary and elementary schools ===
- Alin Elementary School
- Banban Elementary School
- Bandi Elementary School
- Banuang-Gurang Elementary School
- Baras Elementary School
- Bayawas Elementary School
- Cabugao Elementary School
- Cristo Elementary School
- Dancalan Elementary School
- De Vera Elementary School
- Donsol East Central School
- Donsol West Central School
- Gimagaan Elementary School
- Girawan Elementary School
- Gogon Elementary School
- Gura Elementary School
- Juan Adre Elementary School
- Lourdes Elementary School
- Mabini Elementary School
- Malapoc Elementary School
- Malinao Elementary School
- Nagalon Elementary School
- Ogod Elementary School
- Ohana Life Academy
- Old Maguisa Elementary School
- Orange Elementary School
- Pangpang Elementary School
- Parina Elementary School
- Pawala Elementary School
- Pinamanaan Elementary School
- Rawis Elementary School
- San Antonio Elementary School
- San Francisco Elementary School
- San Isidro Elementary School
- San Jose Elementary School
- San Rafael Elementary School
- San Ramon Elementary School
- San Vicente Elementary School
- Sevilla Elementary School
- Sibago Elementary School
- Sta. Cruz Elementary School
- Suguian Elementary School
- Tagbac Elementary School
- Tinanogan Elementary School
- Tongdol Elementary School
- Tres Maria Elementary School
- Tuba Elementary School
- Vinisitahan Elementary School

=== Secondary schools ===
- Banuang Gurang National High School
- Cabugao National High School
- Donsol National Comprehensive High School
- Donsol National Comprehensive High School (Sta. Cruz Extension High School)
- Donsol Vocational High School (Gimagaan)
- Donsol Vocational High School (Gogon)
- Donsol Vocational High School (Tupas)
