= Irosin =

Municipality in Sorsogon, Philippines

- Municipality
- Municipality of Irosin
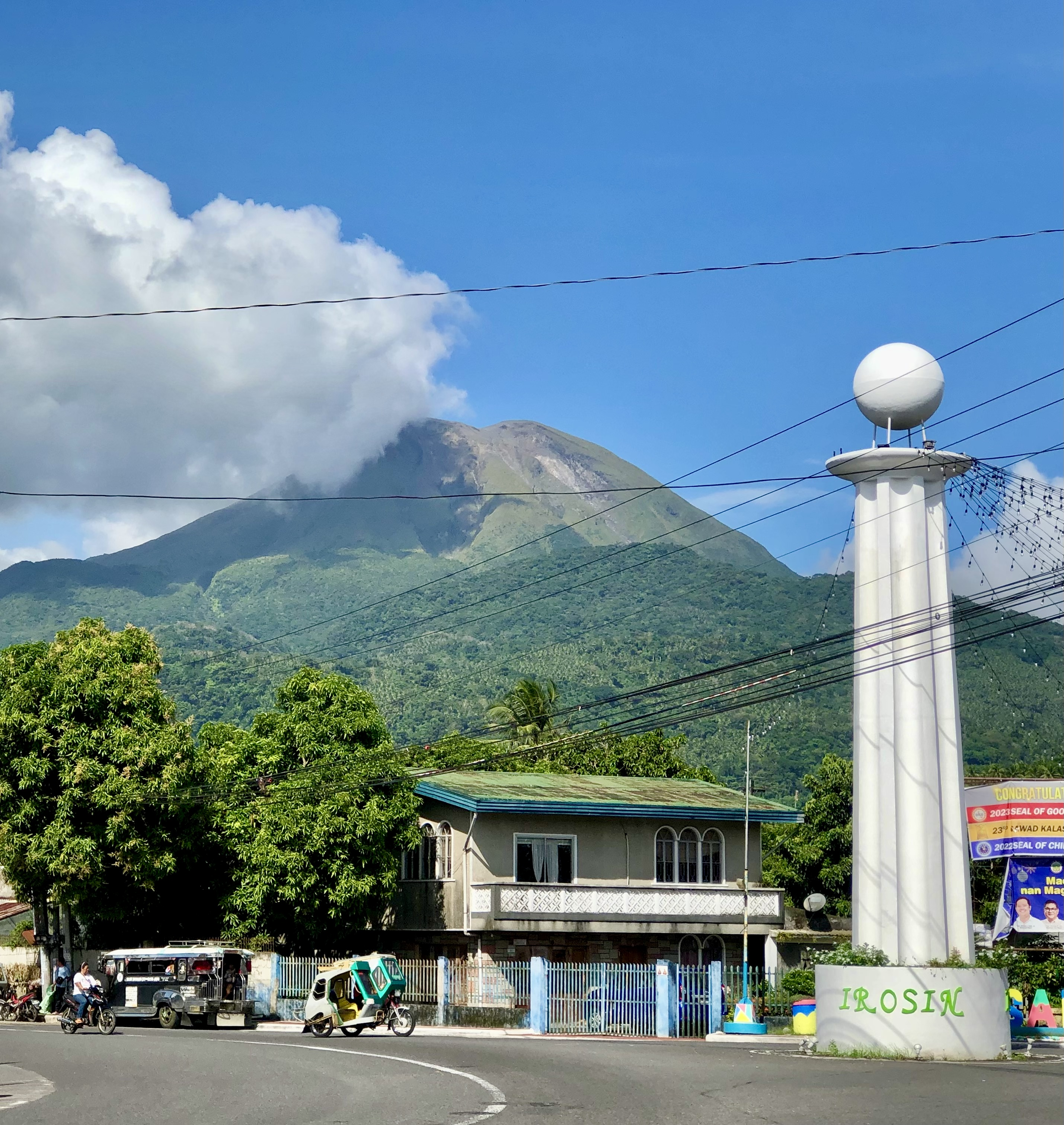
- Irosin Beacon with Mount Bulusan in the background

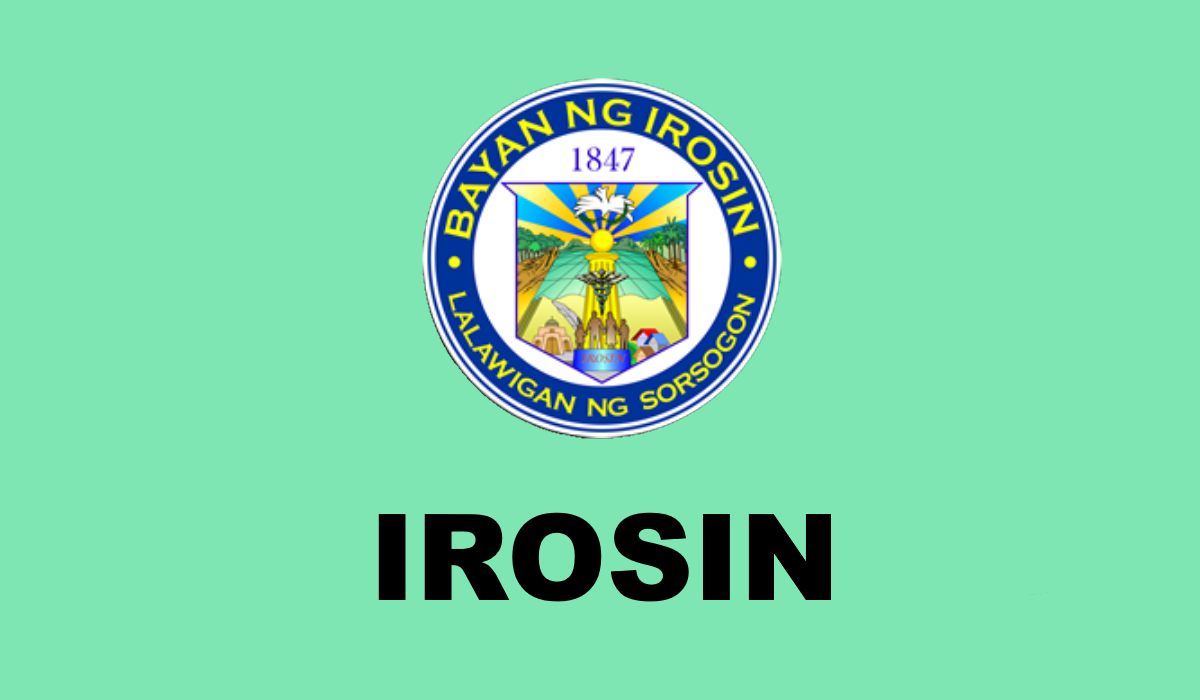
- Flag

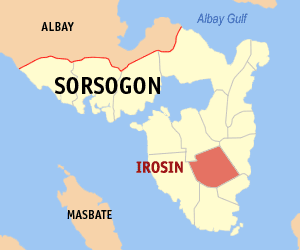
- Map of Sorsogon with Irosin highlighted
- Interactive map of Irosin
- Location within the Philippines
- Coordinates: 12°42′18″N 124°01′55″E
- Country: Philippines
- Region: Bicol Region
- Province: Sorsogon
- District: 2nd district
- Barangays: 28 (see Barangays)

Government
  - Type: Sangguniang Bayan
  - Mayor: Grace Hamor
  - Vice Mayor: Alfredo J. Cielo Jr.
  - Representative: Manuel L. Fortes Jr.
  - Municipal Council: Members: Agustin E. Delmonte III; Virgilio M. Gabito; Irvin Karl S. Fortes; Reynaldo P. Lascano Jr.; Mercy Donna D. Balmes; Ansam J. Bringuela; Antonio G. Gajo; Jhumer B. Ong
  - Electorate: 41,494 voters (2025)

Area
  - Total: 149.87 km^{2} (57.87 sq mi)
- Elevation: 168 m (551 ft)
- Highest elevation: 791 m (2,595 ft)
- Lowest elevation: 20 m (66 ft)

Population (2024 census)
  - Total: 59,540
  - Density: 397.3/km^{2} (1,029/sq mi)
  - Households: 12,753

Economy
  - Income class: 1st municipal income class
  - Poverty incidence: 48.63% (2000)
  - Revenue: ₱ 422.5 million (2024)
  - Assets: ₱ 864.6 million (2024)
  - Expenditure: ₱ 475 million (2024)
  - Liabilities: ₱ 436.4 million (2024)

Service provider
  - Electricity: Sorsogon 1 Electric Cooperative (SORECO 1)
- Time zone: UTC+8 (PST)
- ZIP code: 4707
- PSGC: 0506209000
- IDD : area code: +63 (0)56
- Native languages: Sorsogon language Tagalog
- Website: www.irosin.gov.ph

Irosin, officially the Municipality of Irosin (Southern Sorsoganon: Bungto san Irosin; Waray: Bungto han Irosin, Tagalog: Bayan ng Irosin), is a municipality in the province of Sorsogon, Philippines. According to the 2024 census, it has a population of 59,540 people.

== History ==
Irosin frequently experienced erosion due to river inundations. On December 24, 1933, massive flooding caused numerous fatalities. To prevent the violent surge of the river from eroding the town's mainland, a concrete river control dike was constructed in 1937 under Mayor Felipe Santiago and Congressman Norberto Roque.

=== Contemporary period ===
On April 10, 1989, Irosin was defended by military and police forces, led by Lieutenant Antonio Dy, against approximately 200 communist rebels of the New People's Army, which resulted in 20 rebel casualties; along with the deaths of three female civilians in the crossfire. Dy later received the "Medalya ng Kagitingan" Award in August for leading his 13 policemen to defend Irosin's municipal hall.

The local tourism industry has significant potential, as ecological tourism is a global trend and the national government aims to develop Bicol as a major tourist hub. Given its variety of natural tourist spots and strategic location, Irosin serves as a convergence area for both foreign and domestic tourists and visitors.

Climate data for Irosin, Sorsogon
Month	Jan	Feb	Mar	Apr	May	Jun	Jul	Aug	Sep	Oct	Nov	Dec	Year
Mean daily maximum °C (°F)	27 (81)	28 (82)	29 (84)	31 (88)	31 (88)	30 (86)	29 (84)	29 (84)	29 (84)	29 (84)	29 (84)	28 (82)	29 (84)
Mean daily minimum °C (°F)	22 (72)	21 (70)	22 (72)	23 (73)	24 (75)	25 (77)	25 (77)	25 (77)	25 (77)	24 (75)	23 (73)	23 (73)	24 (74)
Average precipitation mm (inches)	65 (2.6)	44 (1.7)	42 (1.7)	39 (1.5)	87 (3.4)	150 (5.9)	184 (7.2)	153 (6.0)	163 (6.4)	154 (6.1)	127 (5.0)	100 (3.9)	1,308 (51.4)
Average rainy days	13.9	9.2	11.0	12.5	19.6	24.3	26.5	25.0	25.5	24.4	19.4	15.1	226.4
Source: Meteoblue (modeled/calculated data, not measured locally)

=== Political geography ===
Irosin is the only landlocked municipality in Sorsogon province.

Irosin is politically subdivided into 28 barangays, each consisting of puroks, and some with sitios.

- Bagsangan
- Bacolod (Poblacion)
- Batang
- Bolos
- Buenavista
- Bulawan
- Carriedo
- Casini
- Cawayan
- Cogon
- Gabao
- Gulang-Gulang
- Gumapia
- Santo Domingo (Lamboon)
- Liang
- Macawayan
- Mapaso
- Monbon
- Patag
- Salvacion
- San Agustin (Poblacion)
- San Isidro (Palogtok)
- San Juan (Poblacion)
- San Julian (Poblacion)
- San Pedro (Poblacion)
- Tabon-Tabon
- Tinampo
- Tongdol

== Demographics ==
Population census of Irosin
Year	Pop.	±% p.a.
1903	8,644	—
1918	14,775	+3.64%
1939	17,017	+0.68%
1948	19,317	+1.42%
1960	23,134	+1.51%
1970	27,953	+1.91%
1975	30,989	+2.09%
1980	34,978	+2.45%
1990	37,887	+0.80%
1995	41,005	+1.49%
2000	45,507	+2.26%
2007	49,968	+1.30%
2010	51,777	+1.30%
2015	56,662	+1.73%
2020	59,267	+0.95%
2024	59,540	+0.11%
Source: Philippine Statistics Authority

== Economy ==
Poverty incidence of Irosin (%)

Source: Philippine Statistics Authority

== Education ==
The Iroson Schools District Office governs all educational institutions within the municipality. It oversees the management and operations of all private and public, from primary to secondary schools.

=== Primary and elementary schools ===
- Bacolod Elementary School
- Bagsangan Elementary School
- Batang Elementary School
- Benedicto F. Gabito Elementary School
- BLISS Elementary School
- Bolos Elementary School
- Buenavista Elementary School
- Bulawan Elementary School
- Carriedo Elementary School
- Casini Elementary School
- Cawayan Elementary School
- Cogon Elementary School
- Gabao Elementary School
- Gulang-Gulang Elementary School
- Gumapia Elementary School
- Holy Spirit Academy
- Holy Trinity Community School
- Irosin Central School
- Liang Elementary School
- Macawayan Elementary School
- Mapaso Elementary School
- Monbon Elementary School
- Myrtle Christian Learning Center
- Omagom Elementary School
- Salvacion Elementary School
- San Agustin Elementary School
- San Isidro Elementary School
- Severino E. Fortes Memorial School
- Sorsogon Family and Teachers Learning Center
- Sto. Domingo Elementary School
- Tabon-Tabon Elementary School
- Tinampo Elementary School
- Tongdol Elementary School
- Tulay Elementary School

=== Secondary schools ===
- Gabao National High School
- Gallanosa National High School
- Irosin North National High School
- Patag Integrated School

=== Technical and vocational school ===
- Irosin Institute of Science and Technology

=== Higher educational institution ===
- Veritas College of Irosin
- Bonaventure Colleges of Sorsogon Inc.
