= Casiguran, Sorsogon =

Municipality in Sorsogon, Philippines

Casiguran
- Municipality
- Municipality of Casiguran
- Municipal hall

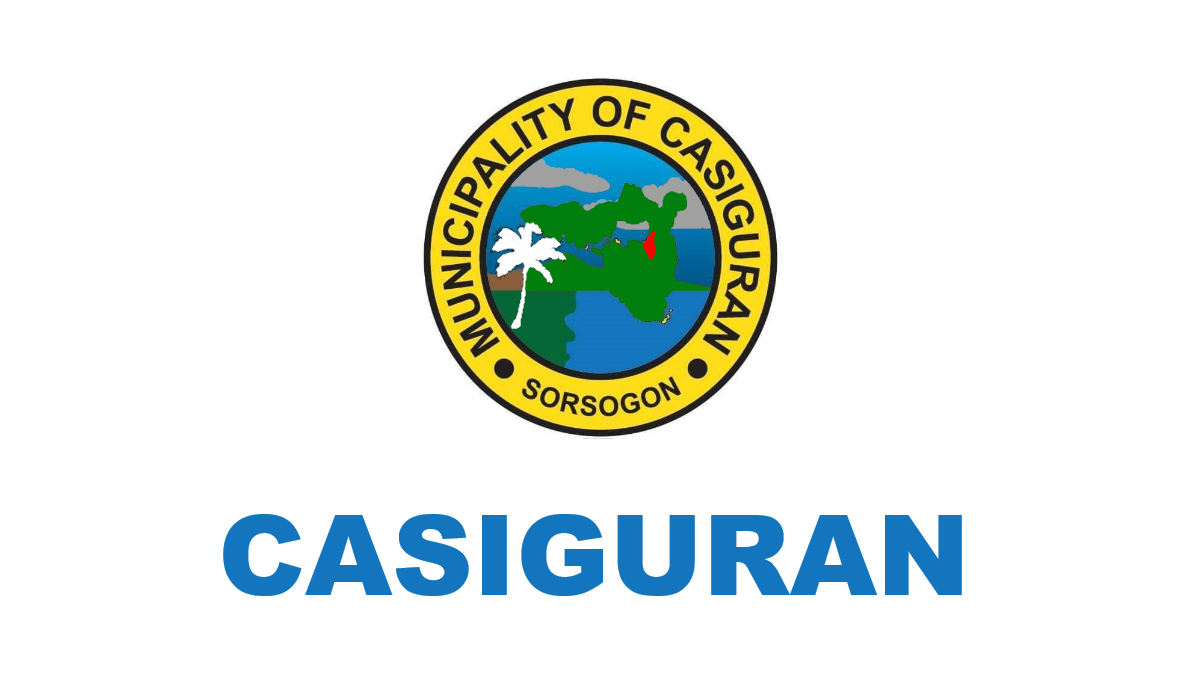
- Flag

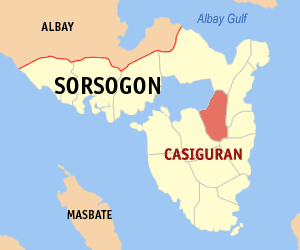
- Map of Sorsogon with Casiguran highlighted
- Interactive map of Casiguran
- Location within the Philippines
- Coordinates: 12°52′23″N 124°00′29″E
- Country: Philippines
- Region: Bicol Region
- Province: Sorsogon
- District: 1st district
- Founded: October 7, 1600
- Barangays: 25 (see Barangays)

Government
  - Type: Sangguniang Bayan
  - Mayor: Ma. Minez R. Hamor
  - Vice Mayor: Dennis Alfonso L. Escudero
  - Representative: Ma. Bernadette G. Escudero
  - Municipal Council: Members: Federico N. Hatoc III; Restituto E. Hamor; Ramon B. Escudero Sr.; Santos R. Palcuto; Samuel E. Encinares; John Art H. Janoras; Ligaya H. Habal; Rey D. Abotanatin
  - Electorate: 23,665 voters (2025)

Area
  - Total: 87.13 km^{2} (33.64 sq mi)
- Elevation: 26 m (85 ft)
- Highest elevation: 162 m (531 ft)
- Lowest elevation: 0 m (0 ft)

Population (2024 census)
  - Total: 36,464
  - Density: 418.5/km^{2} (1,084/sq mi)
  - Households: 8,288
- Demonym: Casiguranon

Economy
  - Income class: 3rd municipal income class
  - Poverty incidence: 36.23% (2023)
  - Revenue: ₱ 251.8 million (2024)
  - Assets: ₱ 692.7 million (2024)
  - Expenditure: ₱ 218.3 million (2024)
  - Liabilities: ₱ 79.57 million (2024)

Service provider
  - Electricity: Sorsogon 1 Electric Cooperative (SORECO 1)
- Time zone: UTC+8 (PST)
- ZIP code: 4702
- PSGC: 0506205000
- IDD : area code: +63 (0)56
- Native languages: Sorsogon language Tagalog
- Major religions: Roman Catholic
- Patron saint: Our Lady of the Most Holy Rosary
- Website: www.casiguran.gov.ph

Casiguran [ˌkaːsɪˈguːɾan], officially the Municipality of Casiguran, is a municipality in the province of Sorsogon, Philippines. According to the 2024 census, it has a population of 36,464 people.

== History ==
Established in the year 1600, Casiguran was the first missionary parish of Sorsogon. When the Spaniards first set foot in this part of Luzon in the 1570s, Casiguran was considered as their center of Kabikolan.

In 1583, the Franciscan missionaries took over the evangelization work started by the Augustinians.

The 1818 census showed 1,023 native families paying tribute and they were coexisting with 28 Spanish-Filipino families in the area.

== Etymology ==
There are two compelling thoughts for the origin of the town's name.

The first is from the name of Gugurang, the supreme deity of the indigenous peoples of Bicol (called Ibalon during the pre-colonial era).

A second is a folk legend, which narrates that the name is phonetically derived from the Bikol phrase 'kasi gurang' (literally translated, "because old") as it is Sorsogon's ancient kingdom.

== Geography ==
Casiguran is located at the coast of Sorsogon Bay, at the south of Luzon island, making it a suburb of neighboring Sorsogon City. It is 17 kilometers (11 mi) from Sorsogon City and 598 kilometers (372 mi) from Manila.

=== Barangays ===
Casiguran is politically subdivided into 25 barangays. Each barangay consists of puroks and some have sitios.

- Adovis (Poblacion)
- Boton
- Burgos
- Casay
- Cawit (Poblacion)
- Central (Poblacion)
- Colambis
- Escuala
- Gogon
- Inlagadian
- Lungib
- Mabini
- Ponong
- Rizal
- San Antonio
- San Isidro
- San Juan
- San Pascual
- Santa Cruz
- Somal-ot (Poblacion)
- Tigbao
- Timbayog (Poblacion)
- Tiris
- Trece Martires
- Tulay (Poblacion)

=== Climate ===
Climate data for Casiguran, Sorsogon
Month	Jan	Feb	Mar	Apr	May	Jun	Jul	Aug	Sep	Oct	Nov	Dec	Year
Mean daily maximum °C (°F)	27 (81)	28 (82)	29 (84)	31 (88)	31 (88)	30 (86)	29 (84)	29 (84)	29 (84)	29 (84)	29 (84)	28 (82)	29 (84)
Mean daily minimum °C (°F)	22 (72)	21 (70)	22 (72)	23 (73)	24 (75)	25 (77)	25 (77)	25 (77)	25 (77)	24 (75)	23 (73)	23 (73)	24 (74)
Average precipitation mm (inches)	65 (2.6)	44 (1.7)	42 (1.7)	39 (1.5)	87 (3.4)	150 (5.9)	184 (7.2)	153 (6.0)	163 (6.4)	154 (6.1)	127 (5.0)	100 (3.9)	1,308 (51.4)
Average rainy days	13.9	9.2	11.0	12.5	19.6	24.3	26.5	25.0	25.5	24.4	19.4	15.1	226.4
Source: Meteoblue (Use with caution: this is modeled/calculated data, not measured locally.)

== Demographics ==
Population census of Casiguran
Year	Pop.	±% p.a.
1903	7,873	—
1918	12,394	+3.07%
1939	12,412	+0.01%
1948	12,940	+0.46%
1960	15,043	+1.26%
1970	20,054	+2.91%
1975	18,224	−1.90%
1980	21,790	+3.64%
1990	22,277	+0.22%
1995	25,804	+2.79%
2000	28,057	+1.81%
2007	30,165	+1.00%
2010	30,995	+0.99%
2015	32,842	+1.11%
2020	35,602	+1.71%
2024	36,464	+0.58%
Source: Philippine Statistics Authority

== Economy ==
Poverty incidence of Casiguran (%)

Source: Philippine Statistics Authority

== Education ==
The Casiguran Schools District Office governs all educational institutions within the municipality. It oversees the management and operations of all private and public, from primary to secondary schools.

=== Primary and elementary schools ===
- Banawang Elementary School
- Boton Elementary School
- Burgos Elementary School
- Cagdagat Elementary School
- Casay Elementary School
- Casiguran Baptist Christian Academy
- Casiguran Central School
- Colambis Elementary School
- Escuala Elementary School
- Gogon Elementary School
- Inlagadian Elementary School
- Mabini Elementary School
- Ponong Elementary School
- Rizal Elementary School
- San Antonio Elementary School
- San Juan Elementary School
- San Pascual Elementary School
- Sta. Cruz Elementary School
- Tigbao Elementary School
- Tiris Elementary School
- Trece Martires Elementary School

=== Secondary schools ===
- Casiguran Technical Vocational School
- Del Carmen Memorial High School
- Estenias Science Foundation School
- San Juan National High School

== Notable personalities ==
- Juan B. Alegre - (1882-1931) a statesman, a delegate of the first Philippine Independence Mission
