= Dette Escudero =

Filipino politician (born 1978)

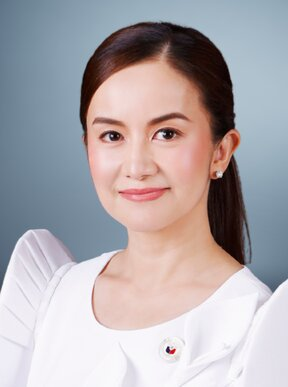
- Official portrait, 2026

Deputy Majority Leader of the House of Representatives of the Philippines
- Incumbent
- Assumed office July 29, 2025 Serving with several others
- Leader: Sandro Marcos

Assistant Majority Floor Leader of the House of Representatives of the Philippines
- In office July 25, 2022 – June 30, 2025 Serving with several others
- Leader: Mannix Dalipe

Member of the Philippine House of Representatives from Sorsogon's 1st district
- Incumbent
- Assumed office June 30, 2022
- Preceded by: Evelina Escudero

Personal details
- Born: Marie Bernadette Guevara Escudero; May 7, 1978 (age 48)
- Party: NPC (2021–present)
- Spouse: Jet Quirante
- Children: At least two
- Parents: Salvador Escudero (father); Evelina Escudero (mother)
- Relatives: Francis Escudero (brother); Heart Evangelista (sister-in-law); Martin Escudero (nephew)
- Education: University of the East (BBA)
- Occupation: Politician
- Website: House website

Marie Bernadette "Dette" Guevara Escudero-Quirante (born May 7, 1978) is a Filipino politician who has served as the representative of Sorsogon's 1st district in the House of Representatives of the Philippines since 2022. She was reelected to the position in 2025. Escudero has also served as the House deputy majority leader since 2025, having previously served as assistant majority leader from 2022 to 2025.

She is a member of the prominent Escudero political family in the Philippines.

== Early life and education ==
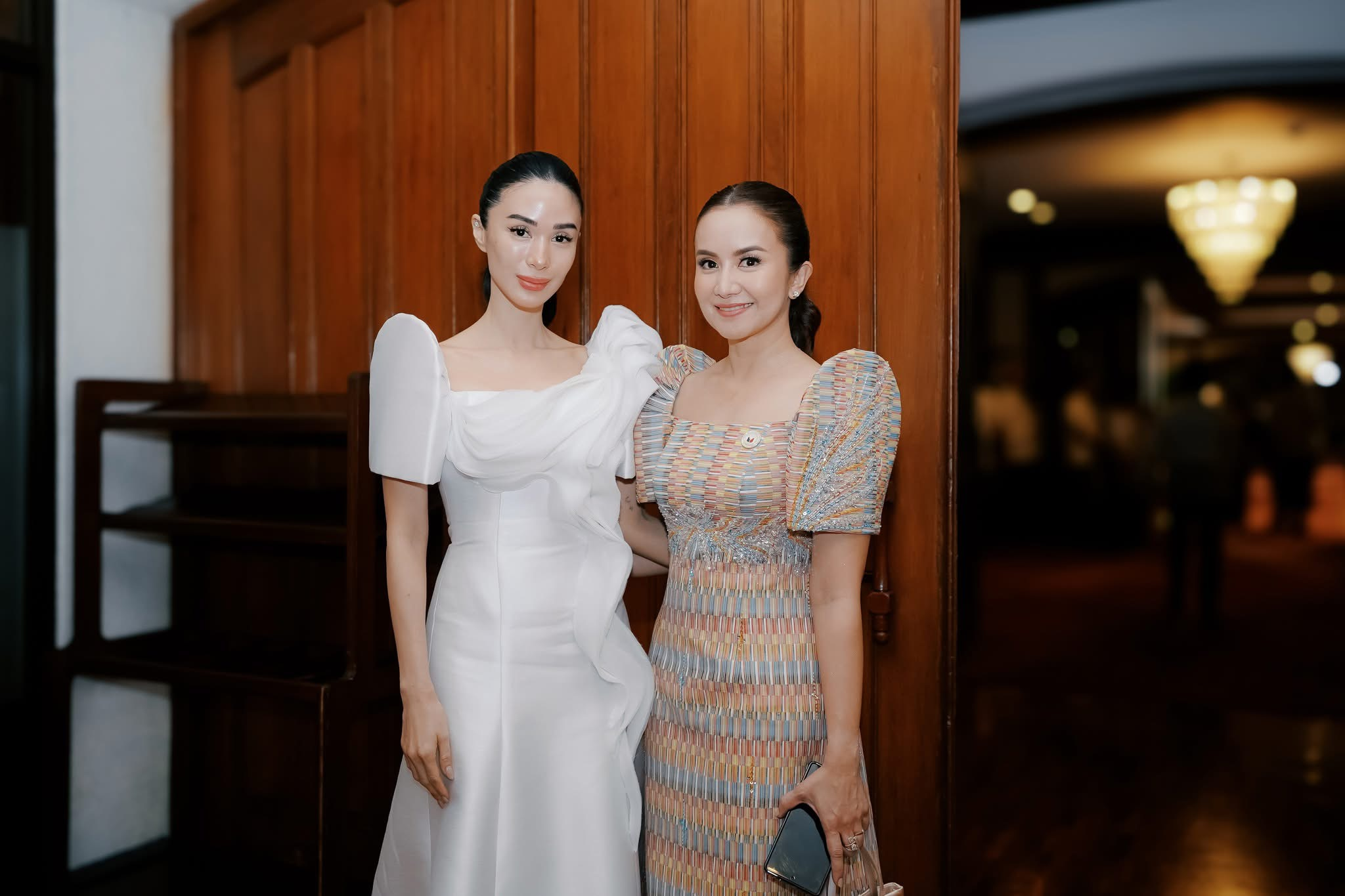
Escudero (right) with her sister-in-law, Heart Evangelista (left), on the sidelines of the 2025 State of the Nation Address

Marie Bernadette Guevara Escudero was born on May 7, 1978, to Sorsoganon politicians Salvador and Evelina Escudero. She has two siblings, including older brother Francis (Chiz), who is an incumbent senator and a former president of the Senate of the Philippines from 2024 to 2025. Her nephew, Mart, is an actor and media personality.

Escudero graduated from the University of the East with a degree in business administration.

== Elections ==
=== 2022 ===
Escudero entered politics following her mother's retirement from elective office. Running under the Nationalist People's Coalition (NPC) party, she contested the 2022 elections for the House of Representatives in Sorsogon's 1st congressional district. She won the seat, effectively succeeding her mother, Evelina Escudero, as district representative.

=== 2025 ===
By October 2024, Escudero had announced her intention to seek reelection in the 2025 general elections. Her older brother, Senate President Francis Escudero, publicly endorsed her candidacy for a second term. The younger Escudero ran and won unopposed. She vowed to continue her projects in the first district, including infrastructure improvements, educational scholarships, health services, and support for farmers and fisherfolk.

== Tenure ==
=== First term (2022–2025) ===
Escudero assumed office on June 30, 2022, as a member of the 19th Congress. In August 2022, she was appointed as one of the assistant majority leaders in the House of Representatives. In this capacity, she helped decide the legislative agenda on the floor, assisting Majority Floor Leader Mannix Dalipe in managing House business. Under the NPC banner, she aligned with the House majority bloc. In the 19th Congress, NPC was part of the supermajority coalition supporting the legislative agenda of President Bongbong Marcos. Escudero was a member of the congressional committees on basic education, agriculture and food, trade and industry, tourism, rural development, and the rules.

Escudero was one of the authors of the New Agrarian Emancipation Act, a law that condoned about ₱58 billion (almost US$1 billion) in unpaid amortizations and interest for agrarian reform beneficiaries. This law, which was a priority measure of the Bongbong Marcos administration, aims to free thousands of farmers from decades-old land debt and was signed as Republic Act No. 11953 in 2023.

Escudero also co-authored the proposed New Philippine Building Act, a comprehensive update to the 1977 National Building Code aimed at making structures more disaster-resilient. The House approved this measure (House Bill No. 8500) in 2023 in response to the need for safer buildings against earthquakes, typhoons, fires, and other hazards.

She introduced a bill known as the Magna Carta of Barangay Health Workers, which aimed to institutionalize a minimum stipend and additional incentives for barangay (village) health workers nationwide. The bill gained bicameral approval in the 19th Congress; however, its ratification was briefly recalled in 2023 due to funding source concerns. Nonetheless, Escudero and her colleagues pledged to refine and refile the proposal.

In addition, Escudero has authored or supported legislation to expand senior citizens' benefits. For example, she filed House Bill No. 7919, titled the Expanded Senior Citizens Act of 2023, which sought to increase the electricity consumption discount for senior citizens to five percent on the first 200 kilowatt-hours of electricity for qualified senior households and broaden the coverage of seniors eligible for utility discounts.

She had been active in House deliberations on education (sitting in the Committee on Basic Education and Culture) and has advocated for inclusive curricula and parental involvement in schools.

=== Second term (2025–present) ===
On July 29, 2025, Escudero was appointed as one of the deputy majority leaders in the House of Representatives during the 20th Congress.

== Personal life ==
Escudero is married to businessman Jet Quirante. The couple has children.

Escudero resides in Sorsogon City.

== Electoral history ==
=== 2025 ===
Sorsogon's 1st congressional district
Candidate	Party	Votes	%
Dette Escudero (incumbent)	Nationalist People's Coalition	197,919	100.00
Total		197,919	100.00
Valid votes		197,919	82.70
Invalid/blank votes		41,401	17.30
Total votes		239,320	100.00
Registered voters/turnout		282,352	84.76
Nationalist People's Coalition hold			
Source: Commission on Elections

=== 2022 ===
Sorsogon's 1st congressional district
Candidate	Party	Votes	%
Dette Escudero	Nationalist People's Coalition	141,922	65.92
Joan Lorenzano	National Unity Party	71,217	33.08
Rommel Japson	Independent	2,149	1.00
Total		215,288	100.00
Total votes		239,581	–
Registered voters/turnout		274,532	87.27
Nationalist People's Coalition hold			
Source: Commission on Elections

== See also ==
- List of female members of the House of Representatives of the Philippines
