= SM City San Fernando (disambiguation) =

SM City San Fernando and SM San Fernando may refer to:

- SM City San Fernando Downtown in San Fernando, Pampanga
- SM City La Union in San Fernando, La Union
- SM City Pampanga in San Fernando and Mexico, Pampanga
- SM City Telabastagan in San Fernando, Pampanga
