= Legazpi Grand Central Terminal =

Bus terminal in Legazpi, Albay, Philippines

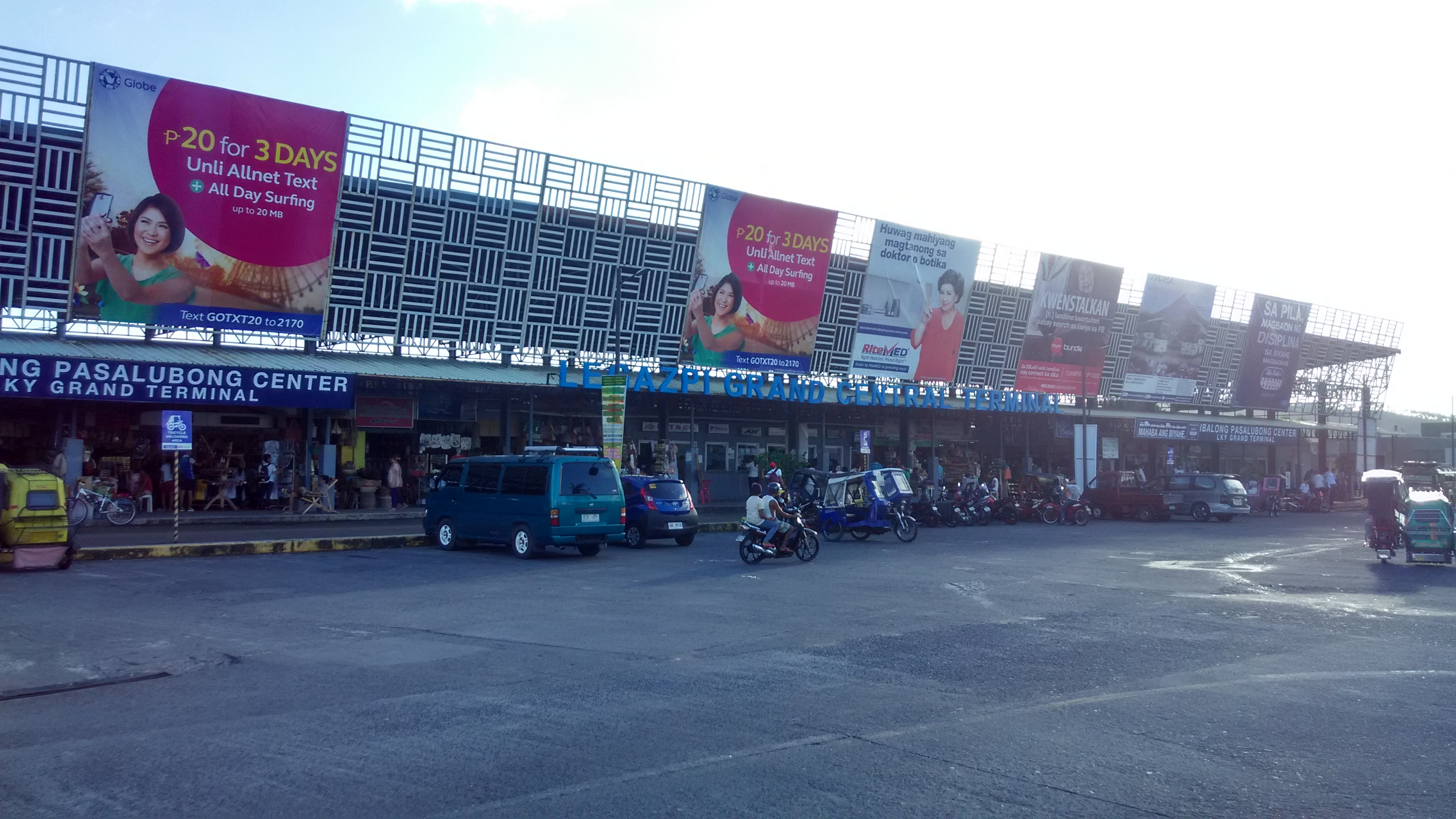

General information
- Location: Legazpi, Albay
- Coordinates: 13.1445°N 123.7451°E
- Operator: LKY Group; City Government of Legazpi
- Bus stands: 30
- Bus operators: Various: ALPS the Bus; Bicol Isarog; DLTBCo; Don Don Liner; Philtranco; Queen's Express; Raymond Transportation; RMB Bicol Express Transport; Superlines
- Connections: LKY Metro Transport and Lifestyle Hub (Jeepney and UV Express terminal); Capantawan

Construction
- Accessible: Yes

History
- Opened: July 9, 2009
Location

The Legazpi Grand Central Terminal is a bus terminal in Legazpi, Albay, Philippines.

== History ==
Legazpi Grand Central Terminal was opened on July 9, 2009. The terminal is operated through a public–private partnership between the city government and LKY Group, a local land developer. The terminal can accommodate to over 30 buses, and also has restaurants and shops. The development of the terminal along with the adjacent mall cost around ₱300 million (US$6 million).

== Location ==
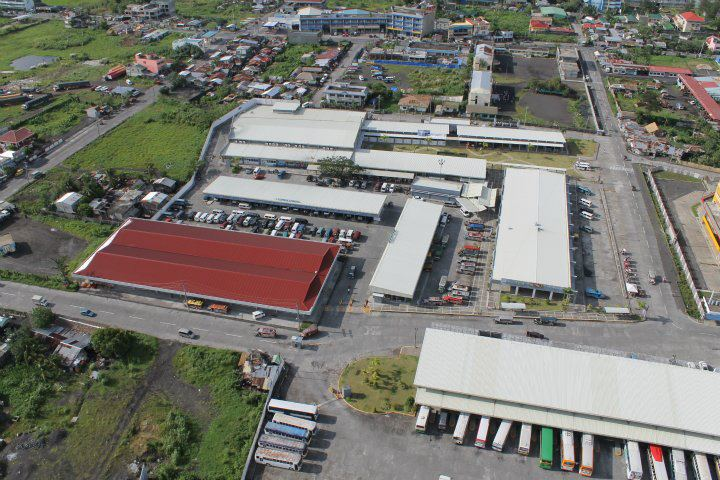
Aerial Shot of the terminal

Legazpi Grand Central Terminal is in the Legazpi Port District. It covers an area of about 3.9 hectares. The terminal is near the Port of Legazpi, Pacific Mall, Yashano Mall, SM City Legazpi and the Ibalong Centrum for Recreation.

== Connections ==
The terminal is connected with a jeepney and UV Express terminal called the LKY Metro Transport and Lifestyle Hub. It serves passengers from the terminal to small towns near Legazpi City, including a jeep that will serve as a direct service to the Mayon Volcano. Like the Legazpi Grand Central Terminal, it also houses restaurants and shops.

The terminal is also a short walk away to the PNR Bicol Commuter station of Capantawan.

=== Ticketing offices ===
The terminal houses ticketing offices for its tenant bus companies. Those bus companies who do not have ticketing offices inside the terminal may sell tickets inside the bus.

== Direct routes ==
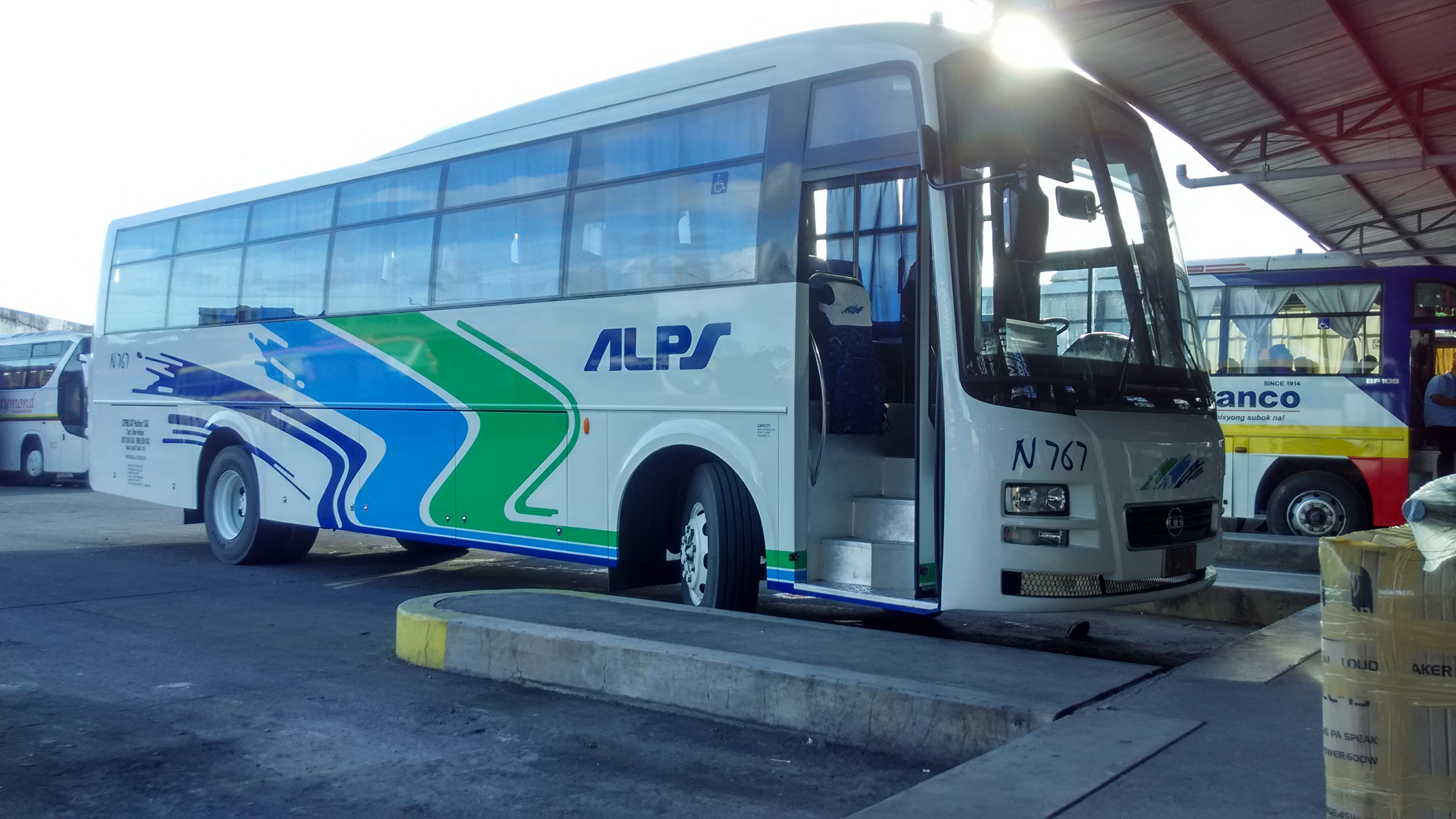
An Alps The Bus N 767 embarking passengers at the Legazpi Grand Central Terminal

The terminal has direct access to Manila, as well as nearer Sorsogon City, Bulan, Iriga, and Naga City.
