= Ayala Malls Legazpi =

Shopping mall in the Philippines

- Location: Legazpi City, Albay, Philippines
- Coordinates: 13°8′48.48″N 123°45′8.28″E
- Address: Quezon Avenue, Legazpi City, Albay
- Opened: April 19, 2016; 10 years ago
- Developer: Ayala Malls
- Manager: Ayala Malls
- Num. of stores: 200
- Num. of anchor tenants: 2
- Floor area: 32,000 m^{2} (340,000 sq ft)
- Floors: 4
- Parking: 250
- Website: https://www.ayalamalls.com/

Ayala Malls Legazpi is a shopping mall developed and managed by Ayala Malls in partnership with Bicol-based retail group LCC Group of Companies. It is located along Quezon Avenue in Barangay Capantawan, Legazpi City, Albay. It is the first Ayala Mall in the Bicol Region. Ayala Malls Legazpi opened on April 19, 2016 and has a gross floor area of 32,000 m^{2} (340,000 sq ft)

== History ==
In September 2013, Bicol-based retailer LCC Group of Companies held a groundbreaking ceremony for its new shopping mall called Liberty City Center. It is located on the site of the former Legazpi Public Market bounded by Luis Los Baños Avenue to the north, Quezon Avenue to the east and Rizal Street and F. Imperial Street to the south. The planned shopping center sits on land owned by the city government and leased by LCC under a 50-year lease agreement.

In January 2015, Legazpi City Mayor Noel Rosal announced that Ayala Land (ALI) had partnered with LCC Group of Companies for the new mall development to be called "Ayala Malls Legazpi". In subsequent news reports, ALI confirmed that they will invest Php1.6 billion in the development of the new shopping complex. Under the partnership, ALI will operate the mall while LCC will operate the department store and supermarket.

The LCC Supermarket - Liberty City Center held its soft opening on December 16, 2015. The full mall formally opened on April 19, 2016. The grand opening was led by local government officials and top executives of Ayala Land.

== Architecture ==
Mall facade

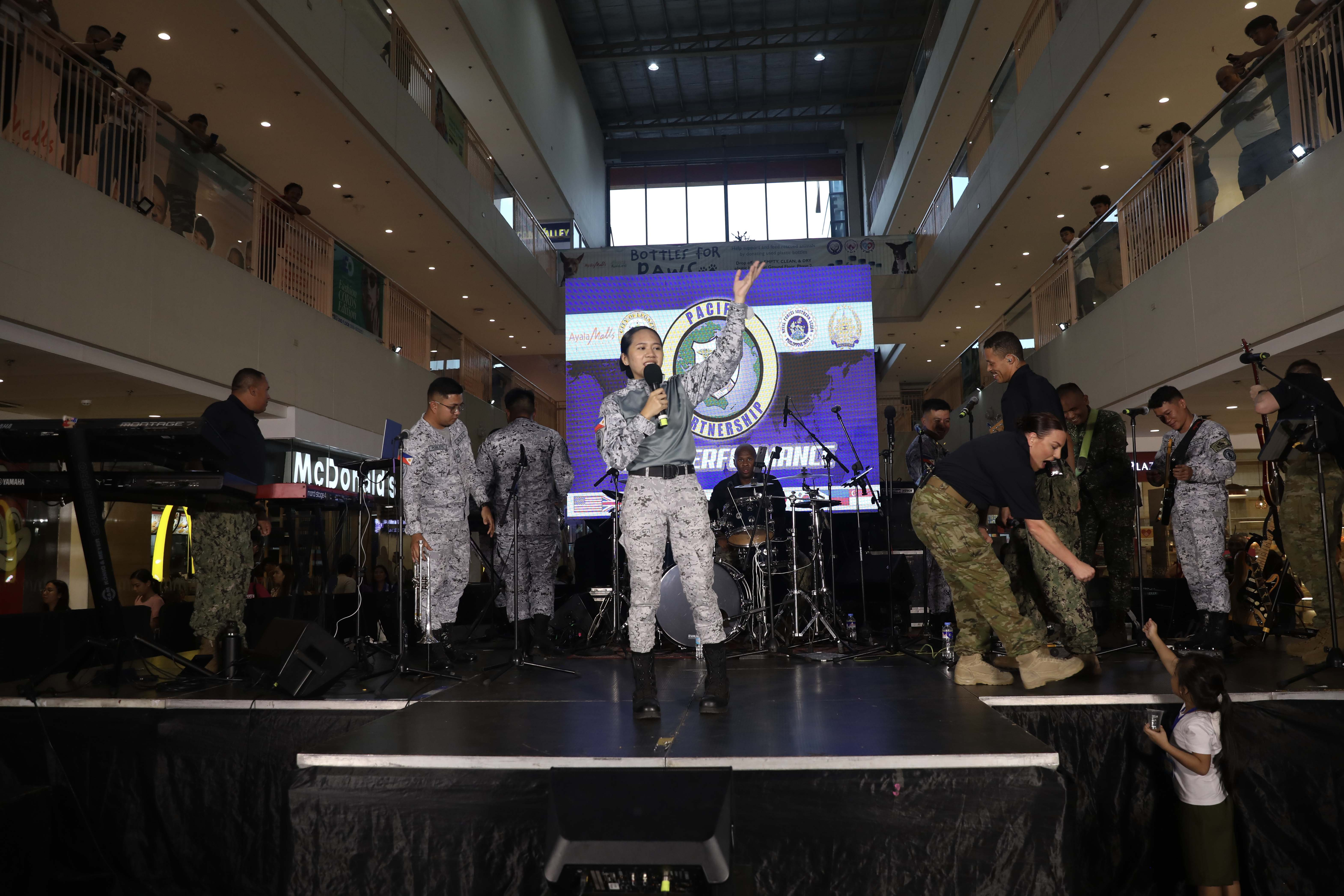
Activity center during a performance by the Philippine Navy Seabees Band

Ayala Malls Legazpi is a four-level shopping mall built on a 1.4-hectare (3.5-acre) lot. The mall has a four-storey atrium designed to let in natural light inside the mall and as a means of ventilation.

== Tenants ==
The mall has over 200 stores, with a mix of local and international brands including "first in Bicol branches” of top dining, service and specialty brands. Hamm Katipunan, Ayala business development and strategic planning group manager said that 10% of the stores are allotted for local businessmen. The mall's anchor stores are LCC Department Store and LCC Supermarket.

Ayala Malls Legazpi also has four digital cinemas, al fresco dining, lower ground parking, an organic garden on the roof deck, Timezone, J.CO Donuts and the first Starbucks cafe in Albay. The mall's roof deck is also utilized for open air concerts and events.

== See also ==
- SM City Legazpi
- Yashano Mall
