= SM City Legazpi =

- Location: Legazpi, Albay, Philippines
- Coordinates: 13°8′37.32″N 123°44′39.84″E
- Address: Imelda C. Roces Avenue corner Terminal Road, Barangay Bitano, Legazpi City, Albay
- Opened: September 14, 2018; 8 years ago
- Developer: SM Prime Holdings
- Manager: SM Prime Holdings
- Architect: DSGN Associates
- Floor area: 87,706 m^{2} (944,060 sq ft)
- Floors: 3
- Parking: 922 slots
- Website: SM City Legazpi

SM City Legazpi is a shopping mall owned and operated by SM Prime Holdings, the largest retail and mall operator in the Philippines. It is located along Imelda C. Roces Avenue corner Terminal Road, Barangay Bitano, Legazpi City, Albay. Opened on September 14, 2018, it is the first SM Supermall in Albay and the second in the Bicol Region following SM City Naga. It is also the 70th SM Supermall in the Philippines after SM City Telabastagan in San Fernando, Pampanga. SM City Legazpi is currently the largest mall in the Bicol Region based on gross floor area with 87,706 m^{2} (944,060 sq ft) of total floor space.

== History ==
In 2015, the city government of Legazpi City announced that SM Prime Holdings is planning to build an SM Supermalls branch in the city. Legazpi Mayor Noel E. Rosal disclosed in a news report that SM Prime Holdings had earmarked Php1 billion for the new shopping mall. Subsequent news reports revealed that SM will spend Php1.5 billion for the new shopping center. In late 2016, SM presented the design of the new mall.

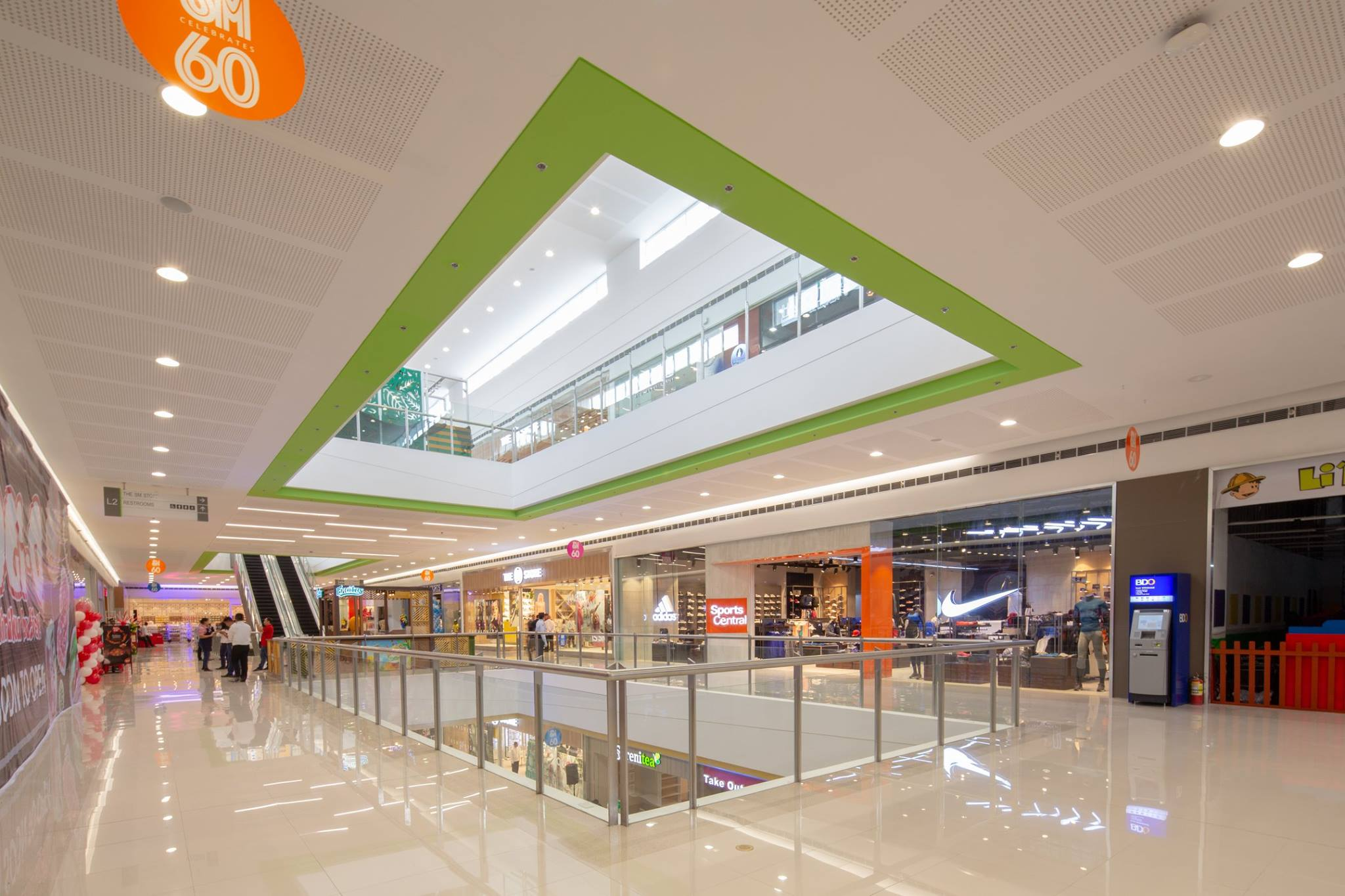
SM City Legazpi Interiors

The groundbreaking ceremony for the mall was held on February 22, 2017, and construction began immediately after. The jeepney terminal and retail complex of the LKY Metro Transport and Lifestyle Hub, including the SM Savemore, were relocated to give way to the construction. In anticipation of possible traffic congestion, alternate roads leading to the new mall are also being planned, according to Mayor Rosal. The mall is expected to generate 4,000 jobs.

The blessing and inaugural sale was held on September 13, 2018, attended by local officials and SM Supermalls officials led by SM Chairman for Executive Committee Hans T. Sy Sr. The mall was officially opened on September 14, 2018, with 85% of its space already lease-awarded.

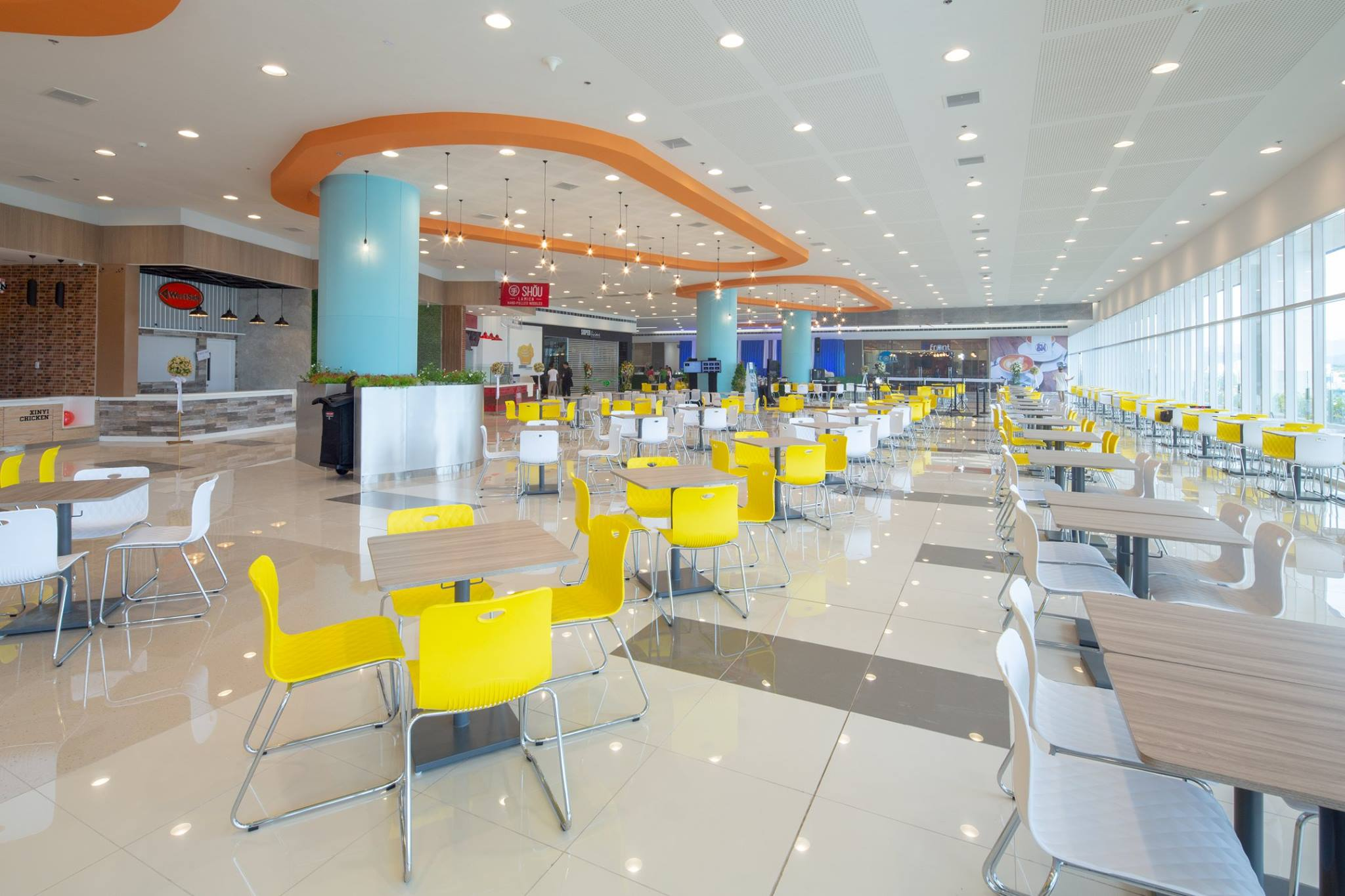
SM City Legazpi Food Hall has a glass wall facing Mt. Mayon

== Mall features ==
SM City Legazpi is a three-level shopping mall with green architecture features. The floor plan follows a z-shaped layout with provisions for natural daylight. Distinct mall features include a glass-walled Food Hall with outdoor balcony and an SM Prestige Lounge, both with panoramic views of Mt. Mayon. The mall also has a 922-slot three-level parking area with roof deck parking and six digital cinemas with 109 comfort seats per theater. Additional facilities include a customer service hub, PWD access ramps, and breastfeeding station. It is a typhoon-resilient structure, according to Annie Garcia, President of SM Supermalls.

== Tenants ==
SM City Legazpi is anchored by SM Store and SM Supermarket. It also has SM Supermalls junior anchors and retail affiliates such as SM Appliance Center, Our Home, Watsons, Cyberzone, ACE Hardware, BDO, Uniqlo, Surplus, National Book Store, Sports Central, Bata Shoes, The Face Shop, The Body Shop, and Miniso. The mall has more than 150 stores including a mix of local, national, and international retail brands, restaurants, and service vendors.

== Location ==
SM City Legazpi is located on a five-hectare property along Imelda C. Roces Avenue (formerly Tahao Road) in the Legazpi Port District approximately 1.5 kilometers from the Legazpi City Hall and 2.3 kilometers from the Legazpi Airport. The mall is located near a former SM Savemore, and is adjacent to the Legazpi Grand Central Terminal and the Ibalong Centrum for Recreation.

== Gallery ==
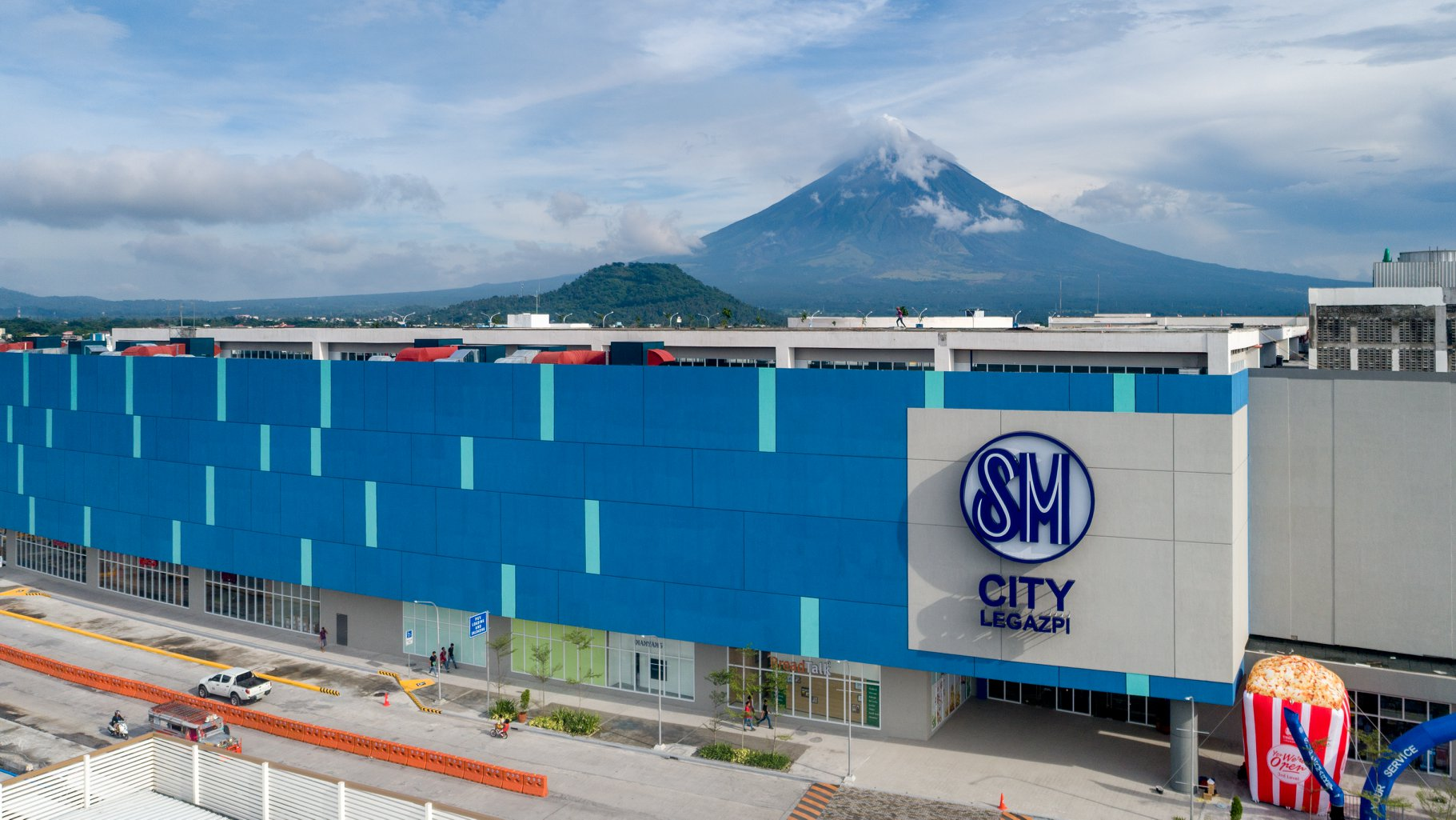
Aerial view of SM City Legazpi

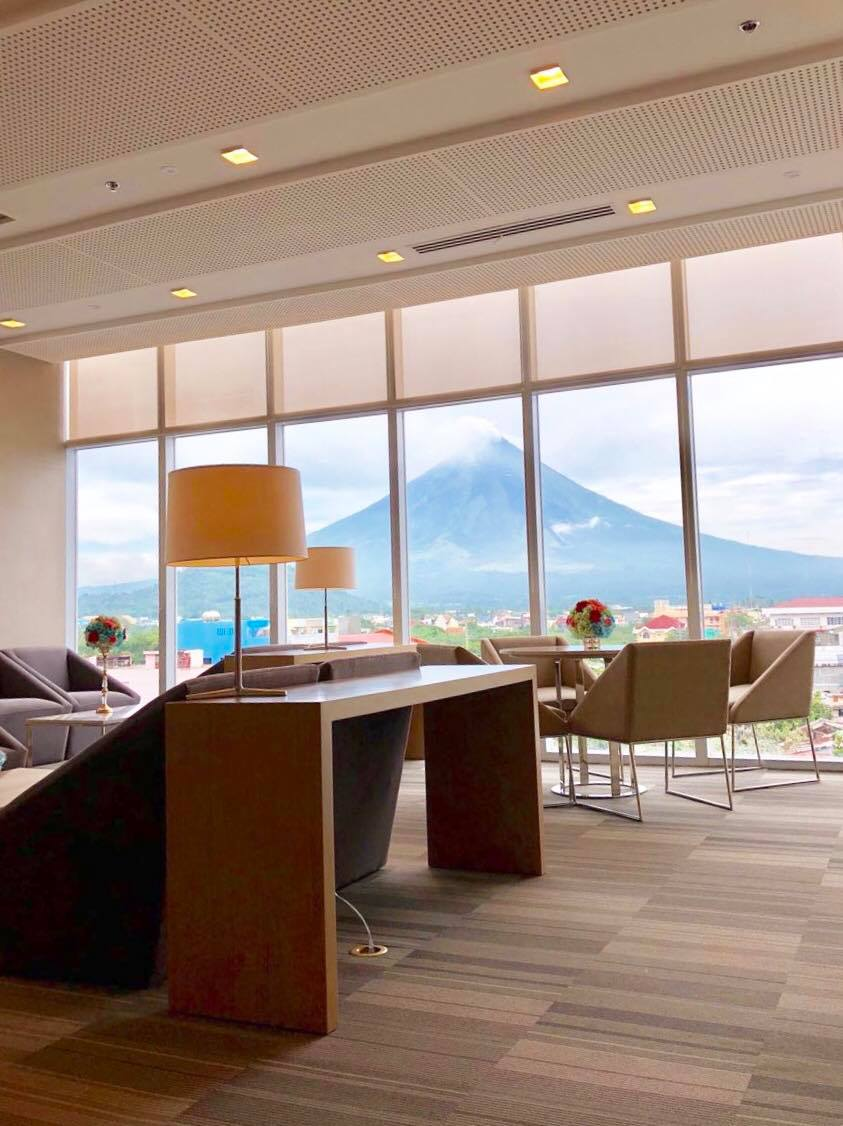
Prestige Lounge

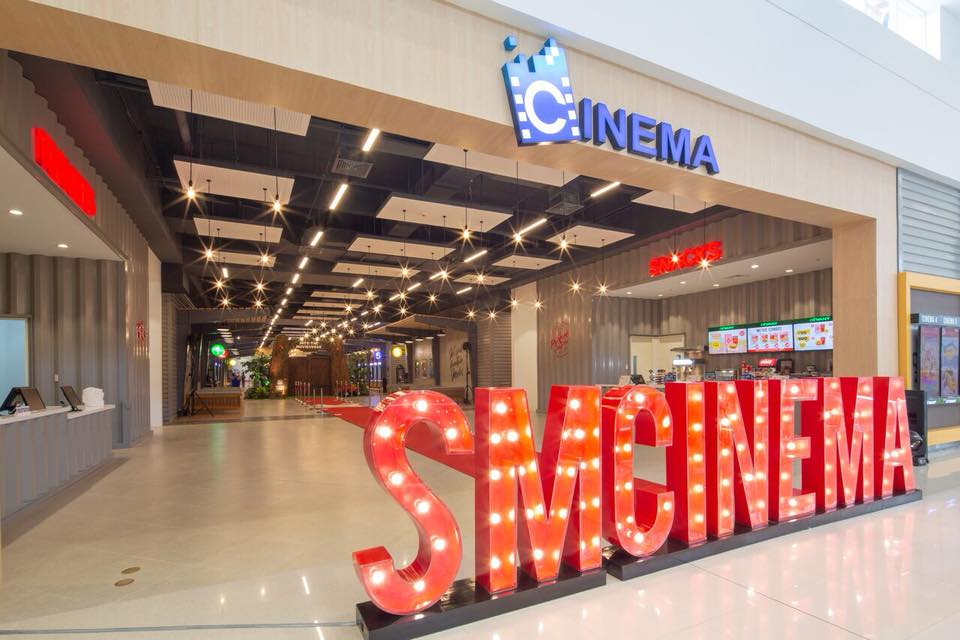
Cinema Lobby

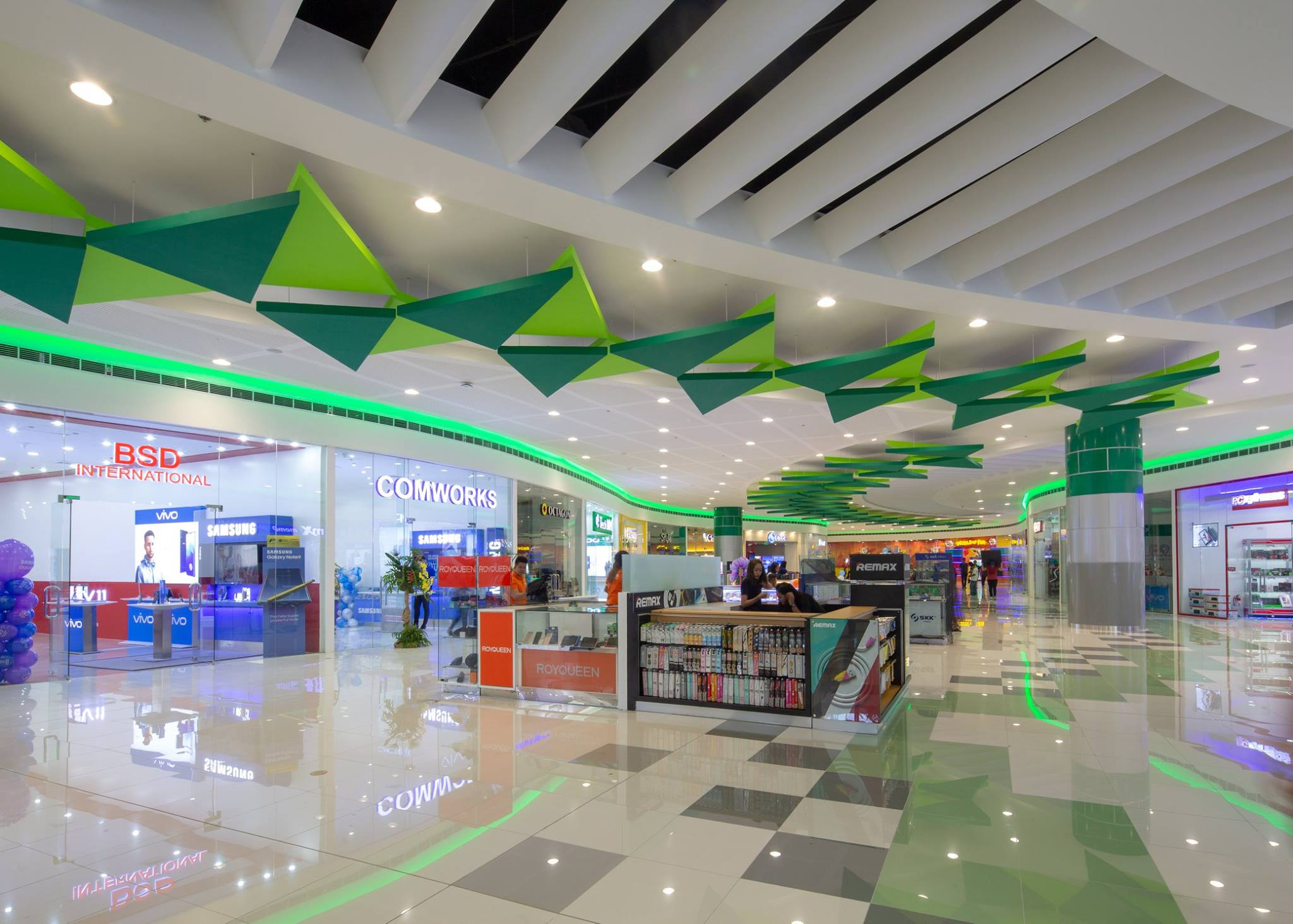
Cyberzone

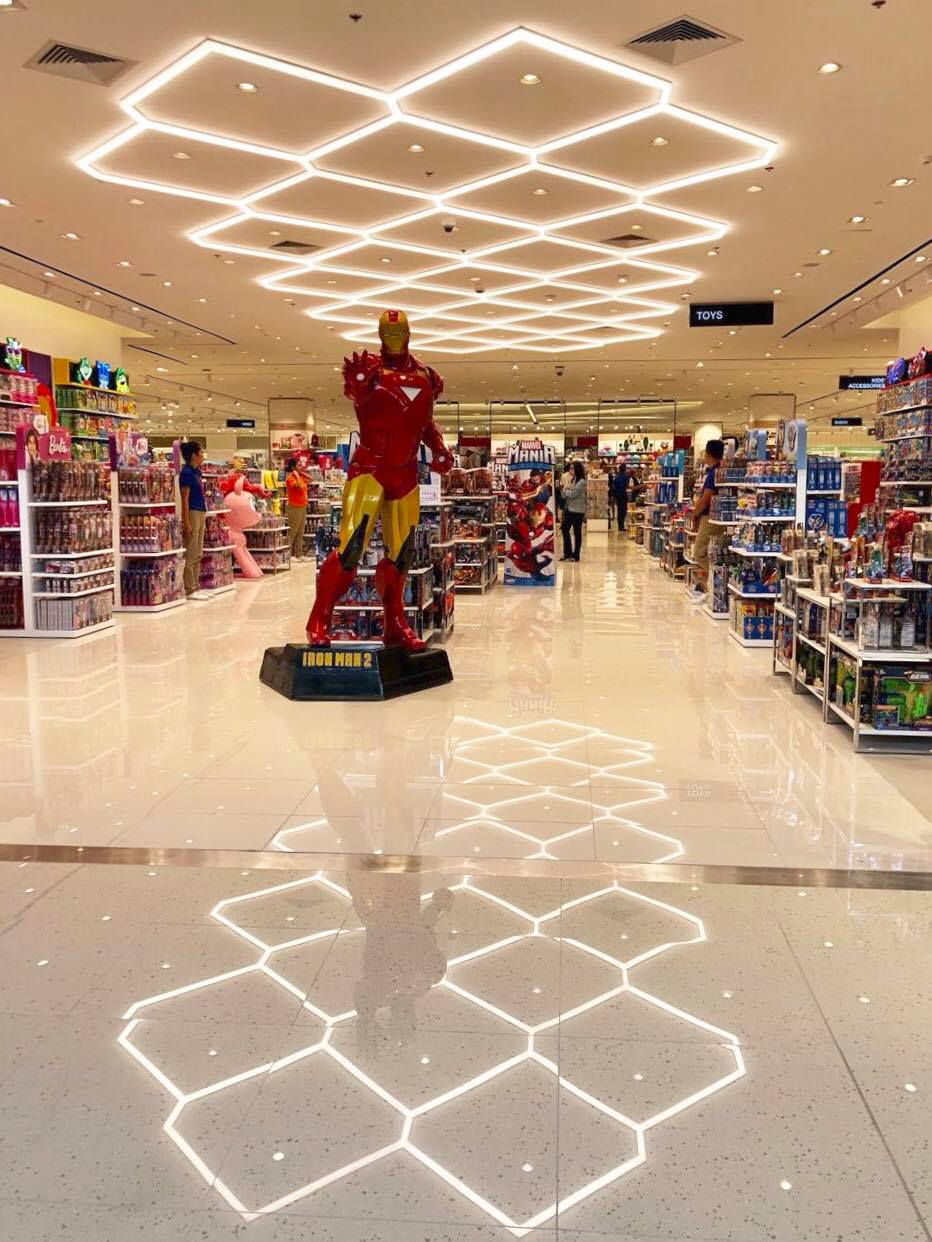
SM Store

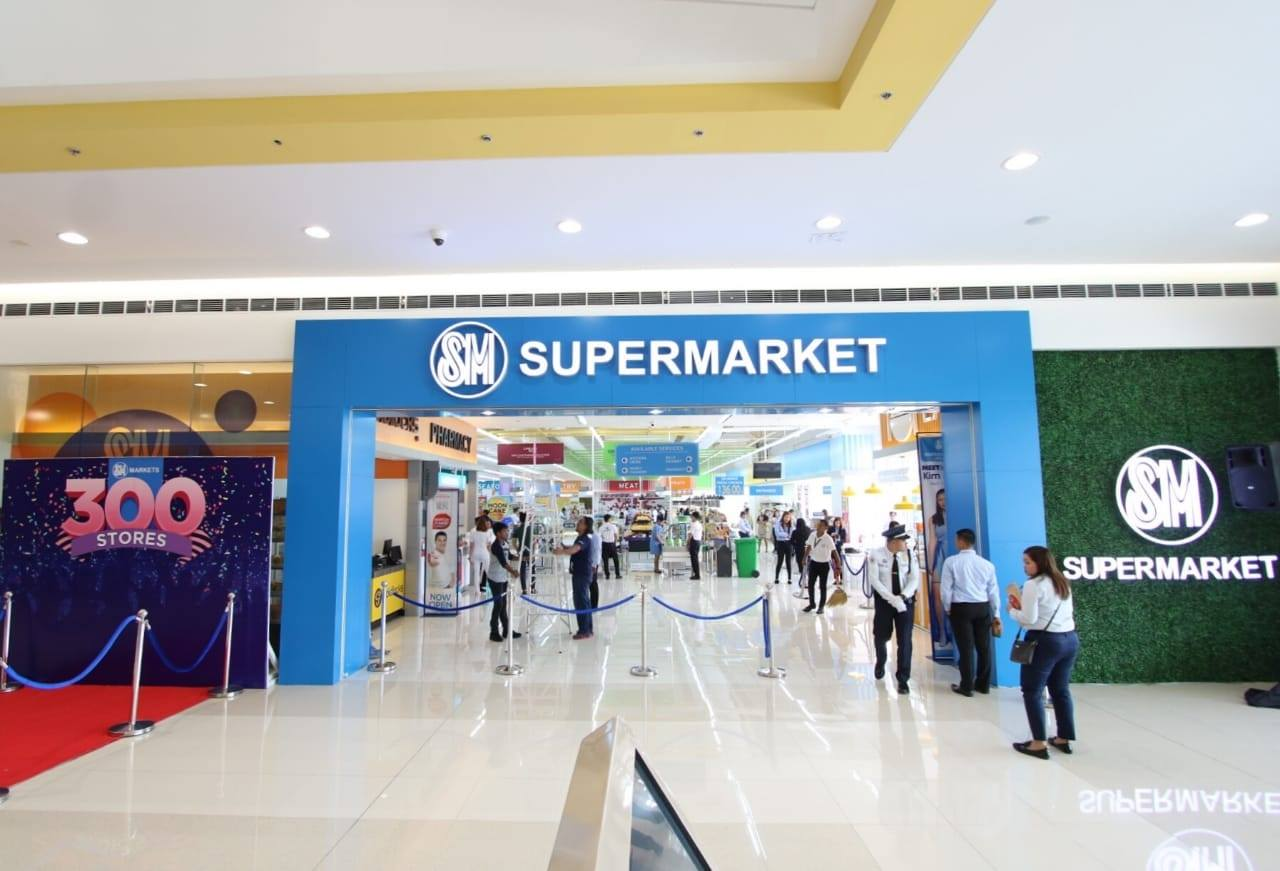
SM Supermarket

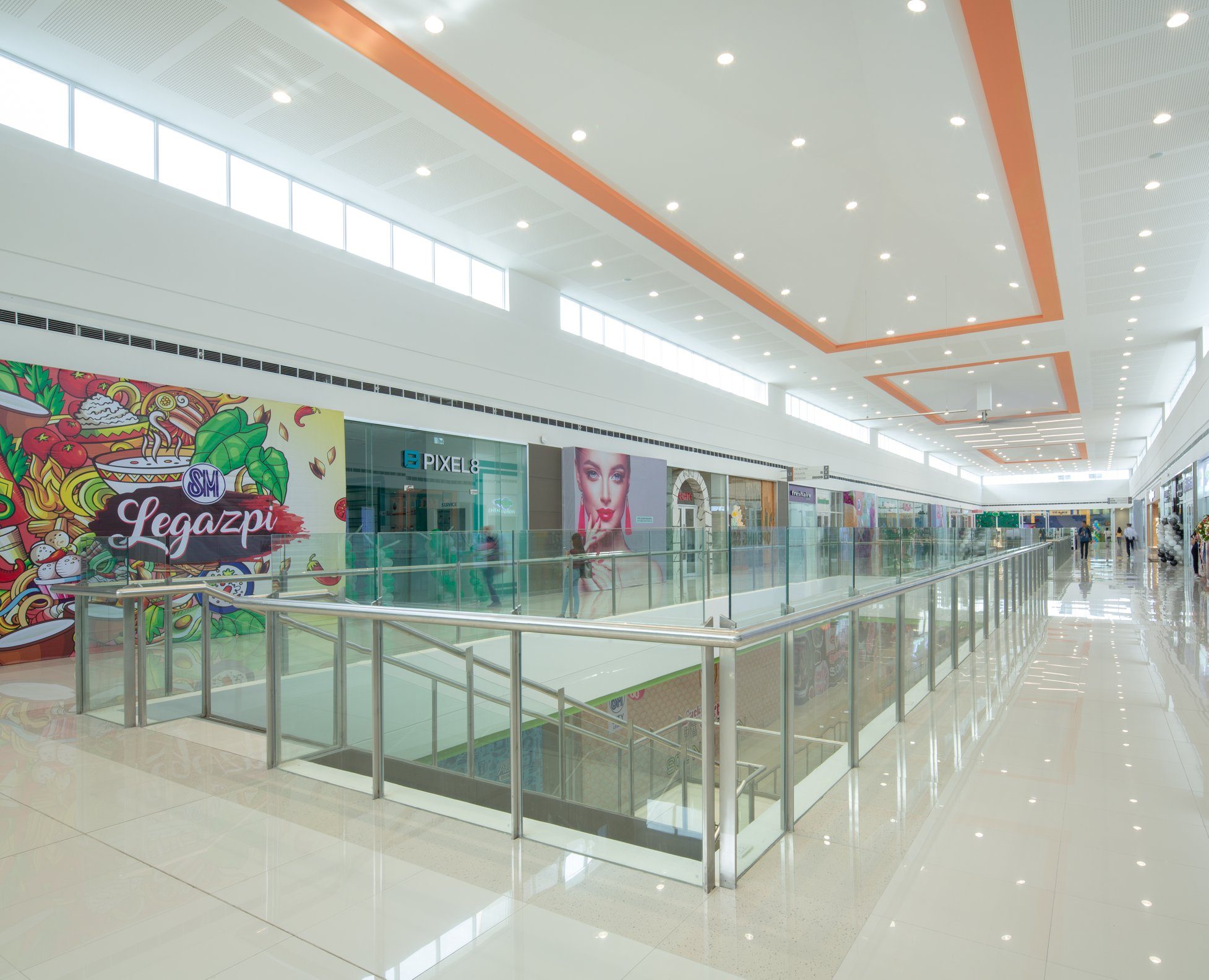
Interiors

== See also ==
- Ayala Malls Legazpi
- Yashano Mall
- SM City Naga

Preceded by SM City Telabastagan	71st SM Supermall; 2018	Succeeded by SM Center Ormoc
