= SM City Naga =

Shopping mall in Camarines Sur, Philippines

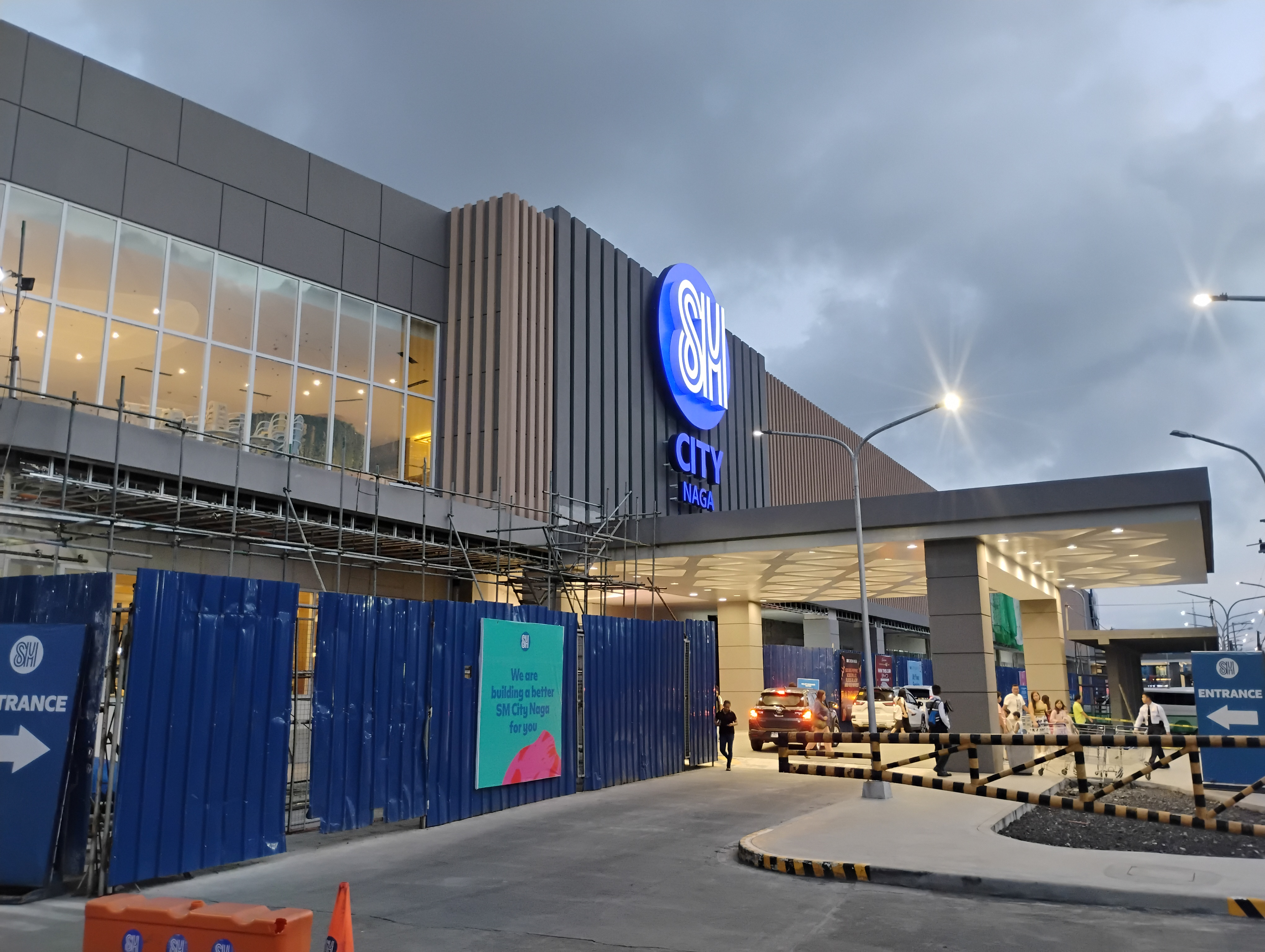
- The facade of SM City Naga in December 2025.
- Location: Naga, Camarines Sur, Philippines
- Coordinates: 13°37′16″N 123°11′25″E
- Address: Ninoy and Cory Aquino Avenue, Central Business District II, Brgy. Triangulo
- Opened: May 1, 2009; 17 years ago
- Developer: SM Prime Holdings
- Manager: SM Prime Holdings
- Num. of stores: 52
- Floor area: 75,652 m^{2} (814,310 sq ft)
- Floors: 2
- Parking: 1,000
- Website: SM City Naga

SM City Naga is a shopping mall located at Brgy. Triangulo, Naga City. Located within the vicinity of Central Business District II, the mall lies along Ninoy and Cory Avenue corner C. Anciano Street, south of the level crossing from Naga Station and Panganiban Drive, north of Central Business District II's commercial zone, such as LCC CBD II and CBD Terminal, and east of Central Business District II's office zone, such as Concentrix Naga Recruitment Site and IBM Naga. This mall sees around 10,000 daily visitors on average.

It is Owned and developed by SM Prime, the largest mall chain owner and developer in the Philippines, SM City Naga has a gross floor area of 64,870 square meters (sqm) (698,254 sq ft) and occupies 46,801 sqm (503,761 sq ft) of land. It has 75,662 sqm (814,418 sq ft) of total floor area. It has a leasable area of 31,398 sqm (337,965 sq ft), 94 percent of which has already been awarded to various tenants. The major tenants are SM Department Store and SM Supermarket, which have respectively occupied 11,991 sqm (129,070 sq ft) and 6,413 sqm (69,028 sq ft) of floor space.

It is the first and only SM Supermall in Camarines Sur and the first in the Bicol Region. It is also the first SM Supermall opened in the first quarter of 2009. The mall opened its doors to the public on May 1, 2009.

== History ==
=== Construction ===
SM City Naga nearing completion in 2009

Construction of the shopping mall started somewhere in 2008. SM Prime planned to open SM City Naga in Camarines Sur in the summer of 2009, originally planning to pull customers from all over Camarines Sur, as well as the contigious Bicolano provinces of Camarines Norte, Albay, Catanduanes, Sorsogon, and Masbate. Its construction was conducive to drive economic growth in Central Bicol, primarily within the vicinity of Naga.

SM City Naga's original construction site was product of a strategic decision to stir more foot traffic as it was deliberately built across the former Naga Transport Exchange, which consisted of the now supplanted Naga Integrated Bus Terminal and the now defunct dual jeepney terminals plying the north and south inter-municipality transportation, its negotiable distance from the Philippine National Railways' Naga Station, and its strategically parallel location south of Panganiban Drive, the main road accessing Centro Naga to the west and Naga Rotunda to the east, eventually leading to the Pan-Philippine Highway (Maharlika Highway) headed both for Metro Manila to the north and Southern Bicol to the south.

By April of 2009, all construction operations on SM City Naga had finished.

=== Opening and inauguration ===
On February 12, 2009, top competing national merchants incentivized to participate had an insider's glimpse of SM City Naga during the Tenants Preview at the SMX Convention Center. SM Prime Holdings president Hans Sy welcomed the tenants; he was joined by SCMC president Annie Garcia, VP for leasing Daisy Chua and SM City Lucena’s former mall manager Jayson Terrenal.

On May 1, 2009, Henry Sy Sr. and members of his family accompanied by different local officials, led by Former Mayor Jesse M. Robredo, spectated a concelebrated mass led by the Former Archbishop Leonardo Z. Legaspi at the mall's atrium. After the Eucharistic celebrations, the stores were promptly blessed by the Archbishop. On the opening day, 94 percent of the leasable area of 31,398 sqm (337,965 sq ft) had already been bought by tenants.

== Mall features, expansion and renovation ==
=== Features ===
==== Exterior ====
SM City Naga was constructed entirely by an unprecedented SM Supermalls design template. The mall's design is characterized by a combination of blue and white colors for the exterior of the main building, with bilateral green brick branding towers displaying the SM logo.

===== Open parking =====
A one-way road circulates around SM City Naga from Ninoy and Cory Ave. corner C. Anciano St. As of September of 2024, the only entrances open into the one-way road are on the north mall front and the south mall front, while the only eligible exit is on the parking garage front.

The open front parking lot accommodated 113 open parking spaces for cars and 253 for motorcycles, however, as of September of 2024, the parking lot is now one of the construction grounds for SM Naga City's expansion operations.

==== Interior ====
The interior was modelled after a T-shaped design, with its ends being two awning-covered paved mall fronts, and one front for the parking garage. In commerce, the interior accommodates about 52 lease spaces and available retail kiosks in its two-level corridors.

On the north mall front, the facade's separate branding tower overhangs above the mall's main fountain. To the right, relative of the exit, a present crosswalk leads towards an integrated taxi and tricycle/e-bike stand plied for Centro service.

On the south mall front, adjacent to the central atrium, the branding tower is fixed to the facade. To the left, relative of the exit, a present crosswalk leads towards a taxi and tricycle/e-bike stand plied for the commercial district of Brgy. Triangulo.

The tier-leveled central atrium jutting out the main building that is adjacent to the south mall front features a high curtain glass wall,

==== SM Cinema ====
The cinemas on the second floor of SM City Naga's parking garage mall front has four cinemas, with a total seating capacity of about 1,400 seats.

The mall opened five new regular cinemas on December 10, 2025. Similar to SM Cinema's newest technology offerings, it is equipped with Ferco seating, an RGB laser projector, and a Dolby 7.1 Surround Sound system. Following its opening, the old cinemas have been renumbered to Cinemas 6 to 8, leaving one cinema hall closed.

===== Covered parking =====
The four-level parking garage at the back portion of the mall is directly connected to the main building via the east mall front. It can accommodate approximately 695 parking slots exclusively for cars, prohibiting motorcycles or any non-automobile vehicles from entering.

=== Expansion and renovation ===
As of late 2024, SM City Naga has undergone a heavy expansion and renovation operation, closing off the open front parking lot, the taxi and tricycle stand and the motorcycle parking behind the queue.

== Tenants ==
=== Mall anchors ===
SM City Naga is anchored by SM Store, most of which is occupied by this two-story retailer, SM Supermarket, respectively occupying 11,991 sqm (129,070 sq ft) and 6,413 sqm (69,028 sq ft) of floor space.

It has SM Supermalls junior anchors and retail affiliates such as SM Appliance Center, SM Cinemas, Watsons, BDO, National Book Store, ACE Hardware, and Naga Bingo. It also has a mix of local, national, and international retail brands, restaurants, and service vendors, totalling about 52 stores and services.

== Gallery ==
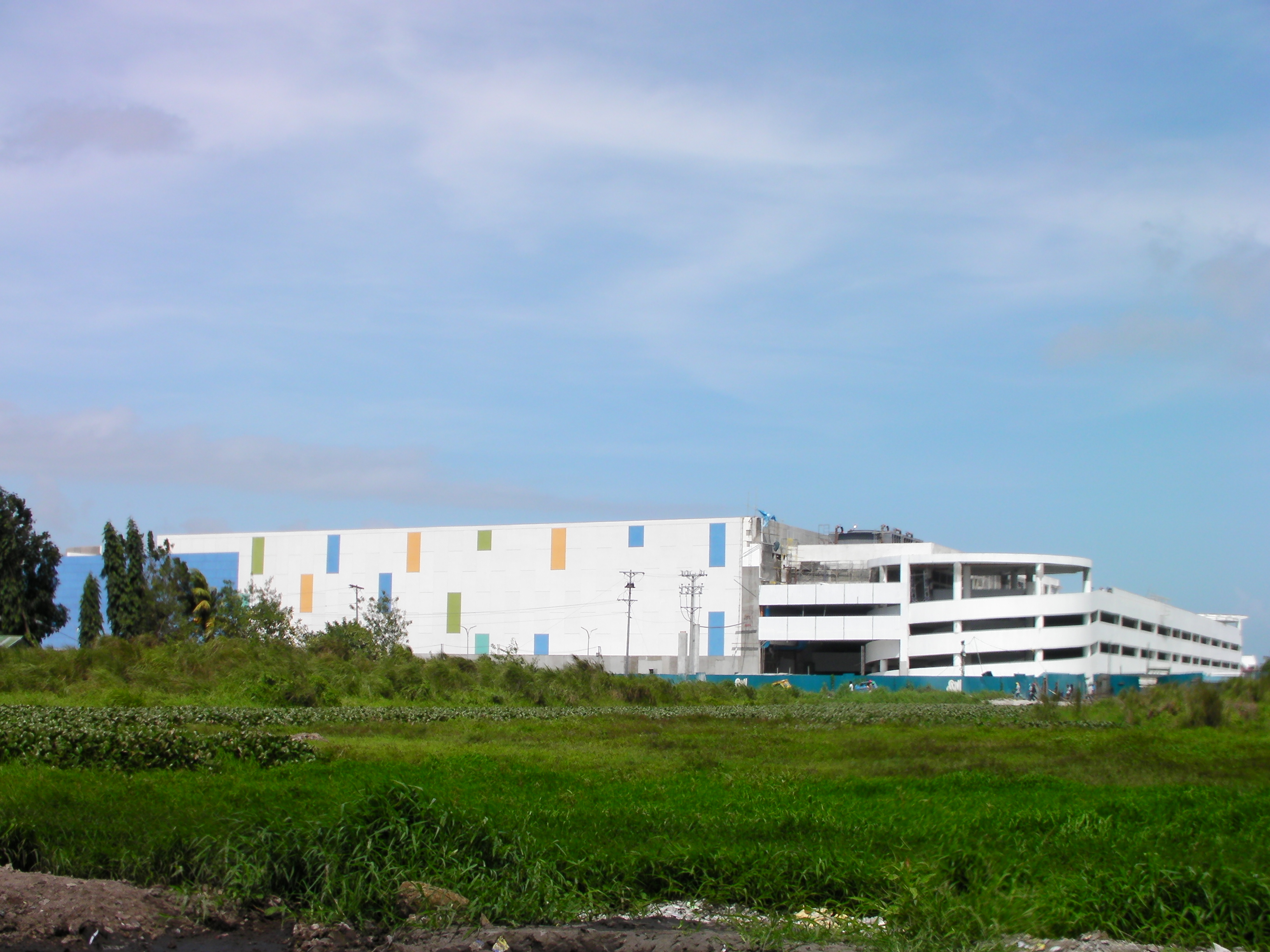

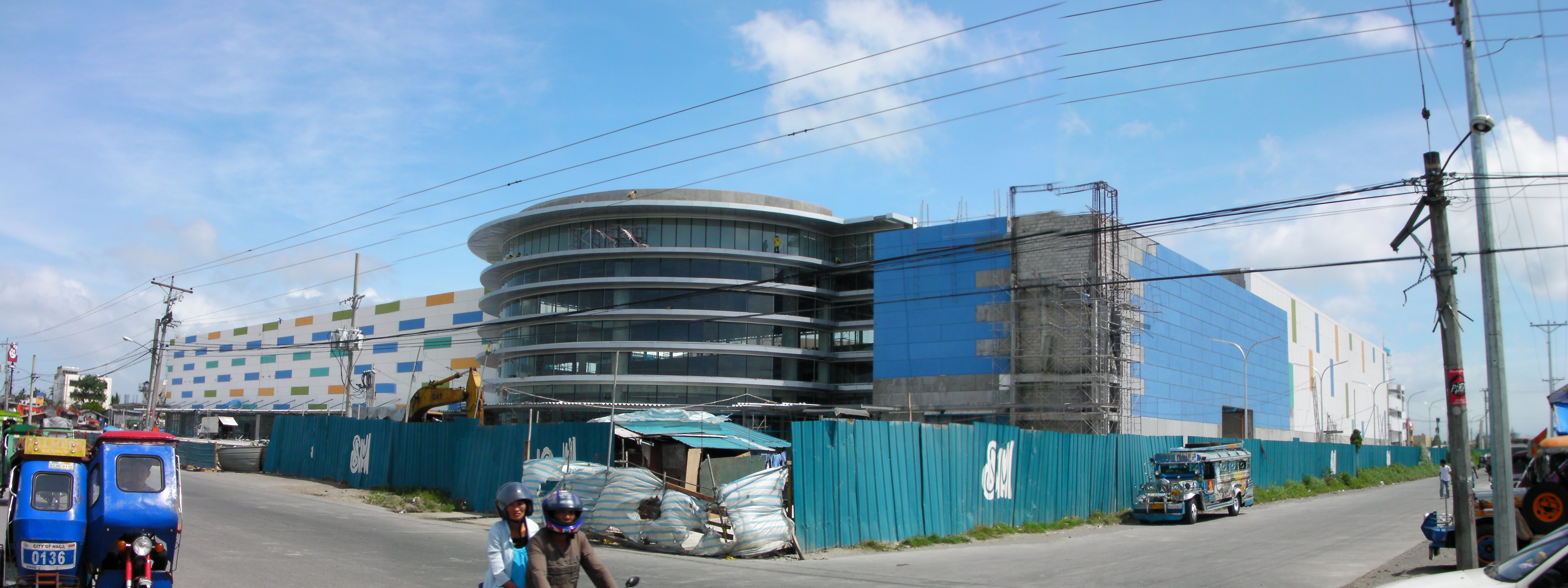

== See also ==
- SM City Legazpi
- SM City San Pablo

Preceded by SM City Baliwag	34th SM Supermall; 2009	Succeeded by SM Center Las Piñas
