= SM City Telabastagan =

Shopping mall in San Fernando, Pampanga

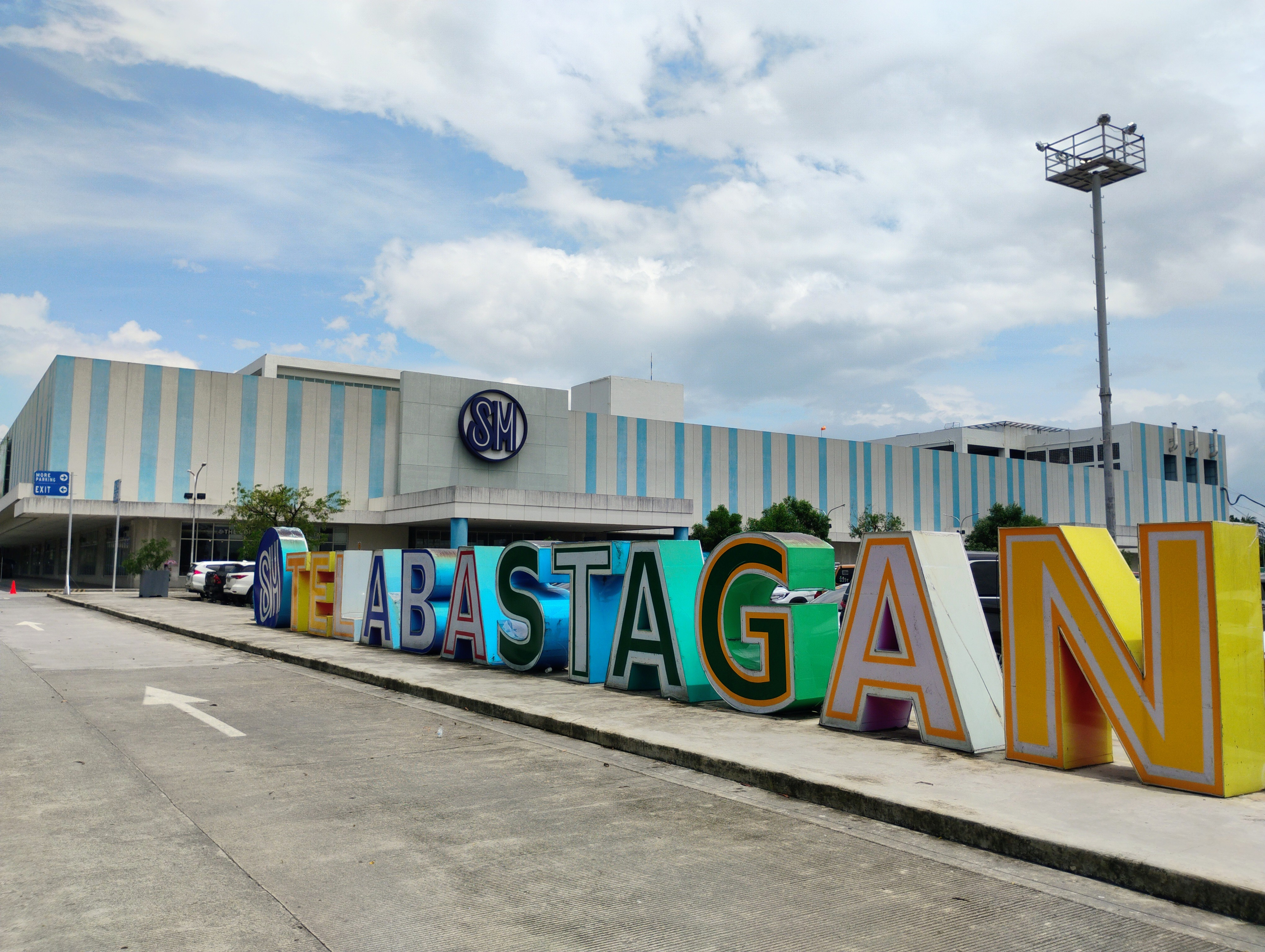
- The mall in 2026
- Location: San Fernando, Pampanga
- Coordinates: 15°07′13″N 120°35′57″E
- Opened: May 18, 2018; 8 years ago
- Owner: SM Prime

SM City Telabagastan is a shopping mall located at the city of San Fernando, Pampanga. The mall officially opened on May 18 with gross floor area of 55,000 square metres (590,000 square feet); 84 percent was already leased. Numerous local events took place in the mall. The shopping center is located close to the MacArthur Highway while accentuating "colorful" designs according to SunStar. The mall has numerous shops in a total of 150 stalls spanning from technology to food. The mall has numerous parking spaces: 728 slots for cars, 720 slots for motorcycles, and 92 slots for bicycles.

== History ==
=== Background and opening ===
In the first three months of 2018, SM Prime had a consolidated revenue of 23.4 billion PHP, a 14 percent increase. The company's net income also grew to 7.6 billion PHP, an increase of 15 percent. Before the opening, two malls by SM Prime were opened: SM City Legazpi on February 16 and SM City Urdaneta Central on May 4. Three malls preceded SM City Telabastagan in the province of Pampanga: SM City Pampanga, SM City Clark, and SM City San Fernando Downtown. The project team for the mall included the DSGN Associates as the design architect while Jose Siao Ling and associates were the main architects, SMEDD Corporation as the project and design manager, D.A. Abcede and Associates as the Construction Manager, and the New Golden City Builders and Development Corp as the General Contractor. On April 16, the government of San Fernando announced that the mall would open at May 18 at 10:00 PHT (02:00 UTC). A day before the opening, SM Prime announced that the mall had a gross floor area of 55,000 square metres (590,000 square feet). The mall was planned to open with 84 percent of the lease space already awarded. The mall officially opened on May 18.

=== Further history ===
On May 18, 2020, the mall re-opened after the COVID-19 pandemic with strict rules including a no mask, no entry policy, physical distancing, and bodily temperature checking. A specialized sanitation team was deployed to regularly disinfect normally touched areas. In June 2025, the mall joined the 2025 Kalayaan Job Fair which was a collaboration between the government of San Fernando and the Department of Labor and Employment Central Luzon. In September 2025, a local film festival was held by the tourism office of San Fernando.

== Architecture and description ==
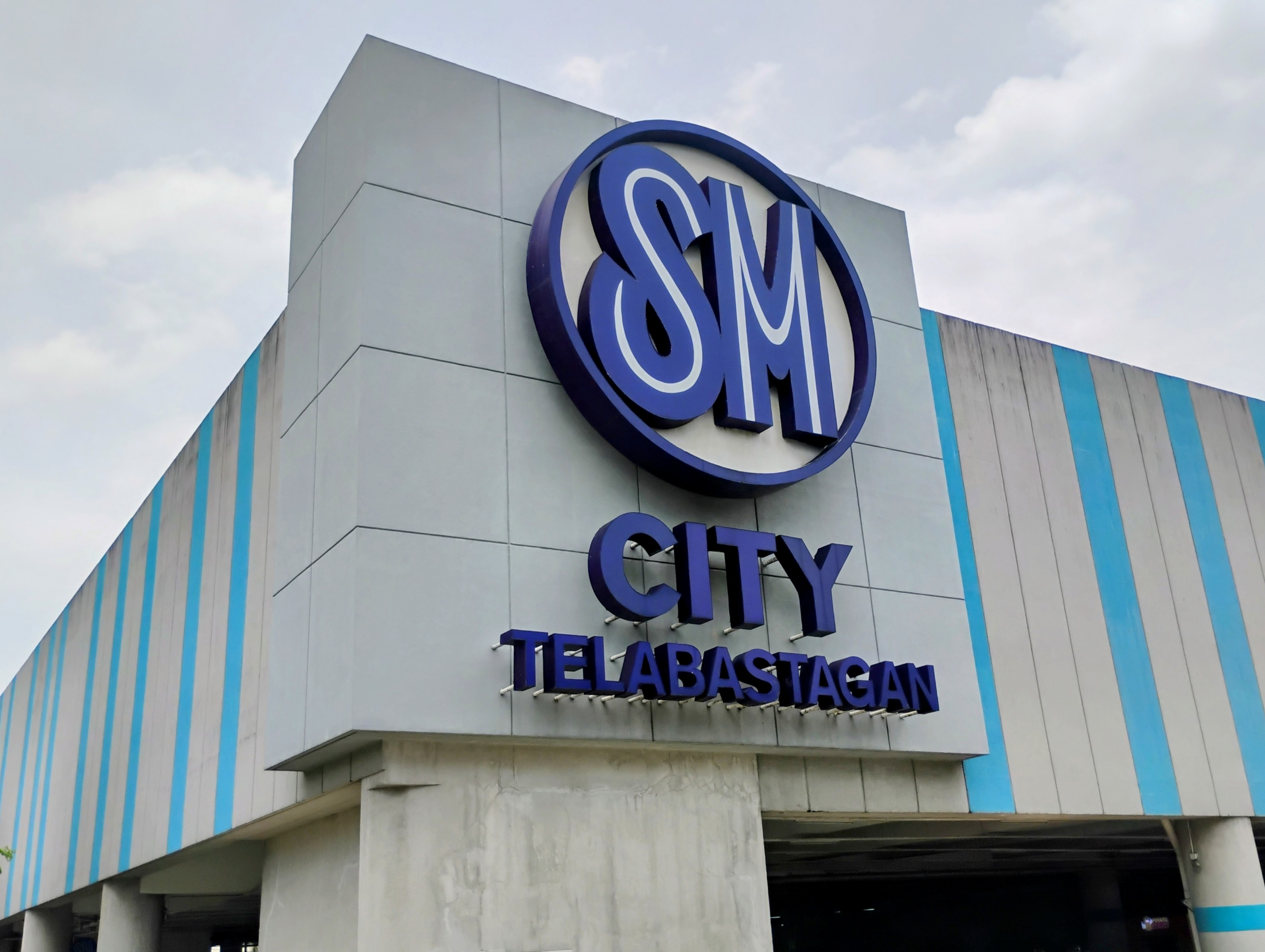
Exterior of the mall

The mall was built in a 105,694 m^{2} (1,137,680 sq ft) site while having two floors and 150 stalls. It is located close to the MacArthur Highway, one of Pampanga's "major thoroughfares" according to SM Prime. Due to traffic concerns, within the congested portion of MacArthur Highway in the area, the mall management designed a service road along the mall's facade. According to SunStar, the mall had "a series of bold and dynamic interlocking, geometrical forms [which] creates a vivid, colorful backdrop that continues around the building." The sidewalk frontage had generous landscaping which were covered by a sequence of canopies which support the interior design. The mall's interior is based on two sizeable corridors which, according to SunStar, make shopping easy by allowing a "clear line of sight". A clerestory provides daylight to all areas of the mall while a "burst of colors" accent the ceiling.

== Features ==
=== Shops and stores ===
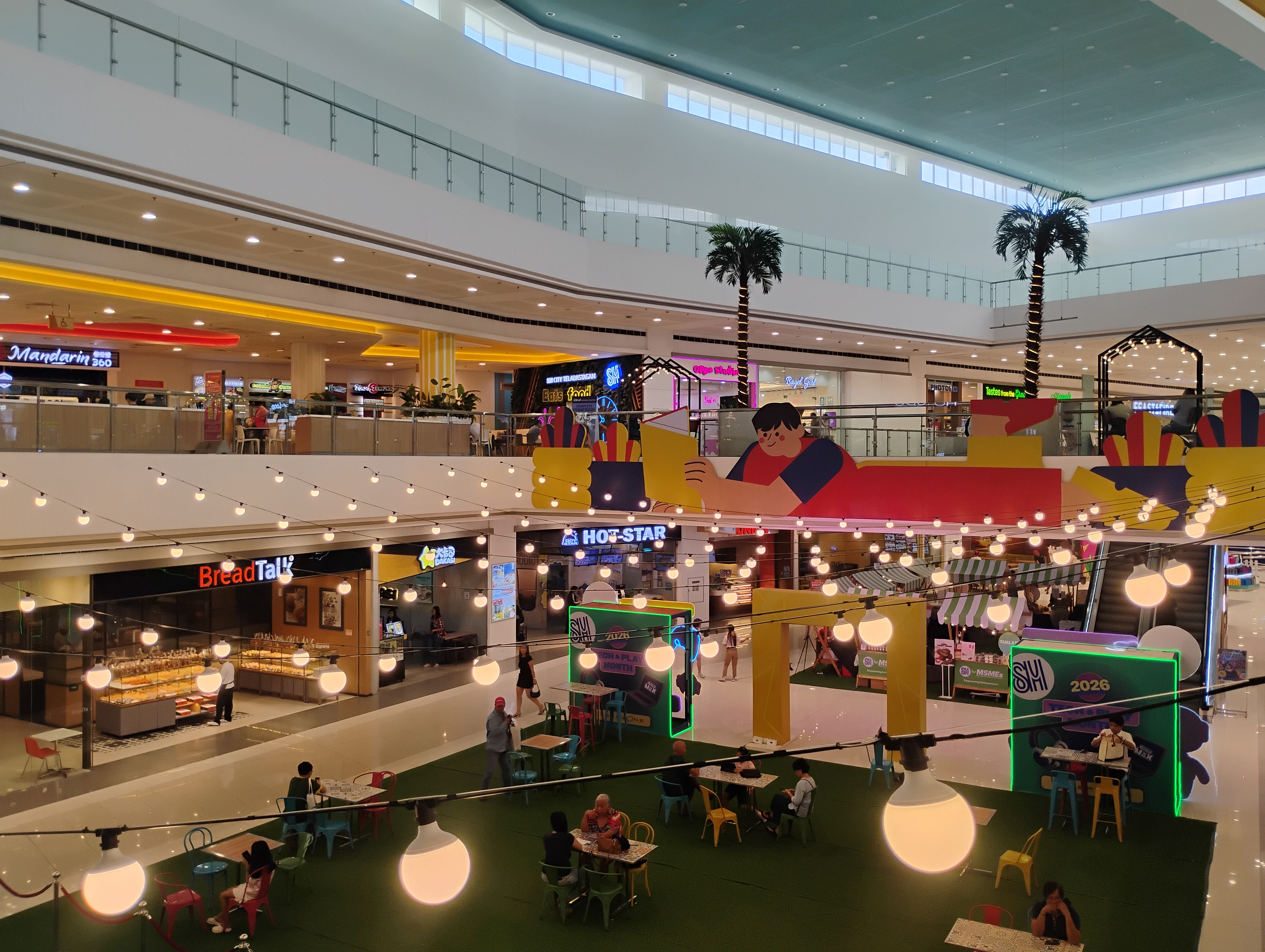
Interior of the mall

The mall has numerous stores owned by SM Prime, particularly SM Store, SM Supermarket, and SM Appliance Center. Other major stores include Ace Hardware, Watsons, Uniqlo, and Crocs. The mall also holds fashion and sports brands, jewelry shops, bookstores, eyewear stores, and more. It also has a cyberzone. Numerous restaurants are situated in the shopping center; most of them are situated in the food court. Banks, wellness areas, and other places are also in the mall. SM Supermalls Vice President Junias Eusebio stated that the mall was based on "the rich culture of Pampanga. The Kapampangans' love for festivals, their love of food and many more". Numerous entrances are placed in all sides of the mall.

=== Cinemas and transportation ===
The shopping center has six cinemas. The mall has numerous parking spaces: 728 slots for cars, 720 slots for motorcycles, and 92 slots for bicycles. Shoppers in private vehicles are transported from the main entrance to the primary parking lot in a short amount of time. A public utility terminal and passenger drop off zones contribute to transportation near and in the mall.
