= Matnog =

Municipality in Sorsogon, Philippines

- Municipality
- Municipality of Matnog
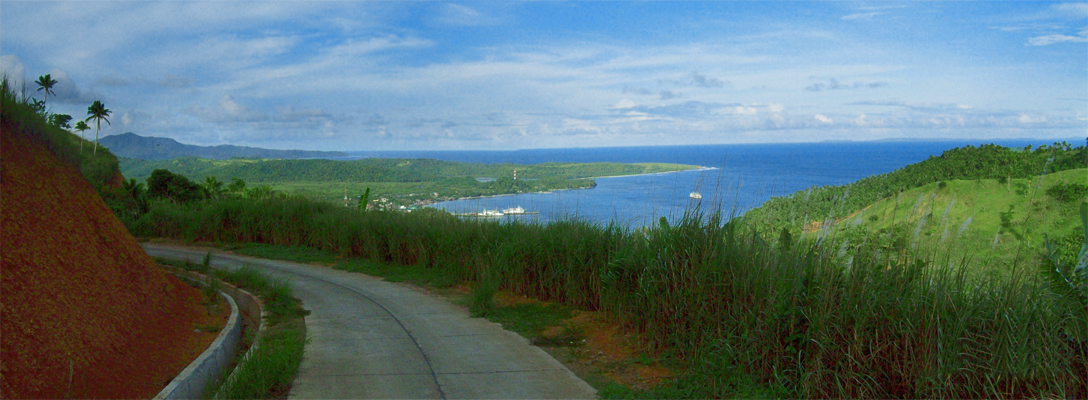
- Skyline of Matnog Matnog Port from the San Bernardino strait Sunrise over Matnog Bay

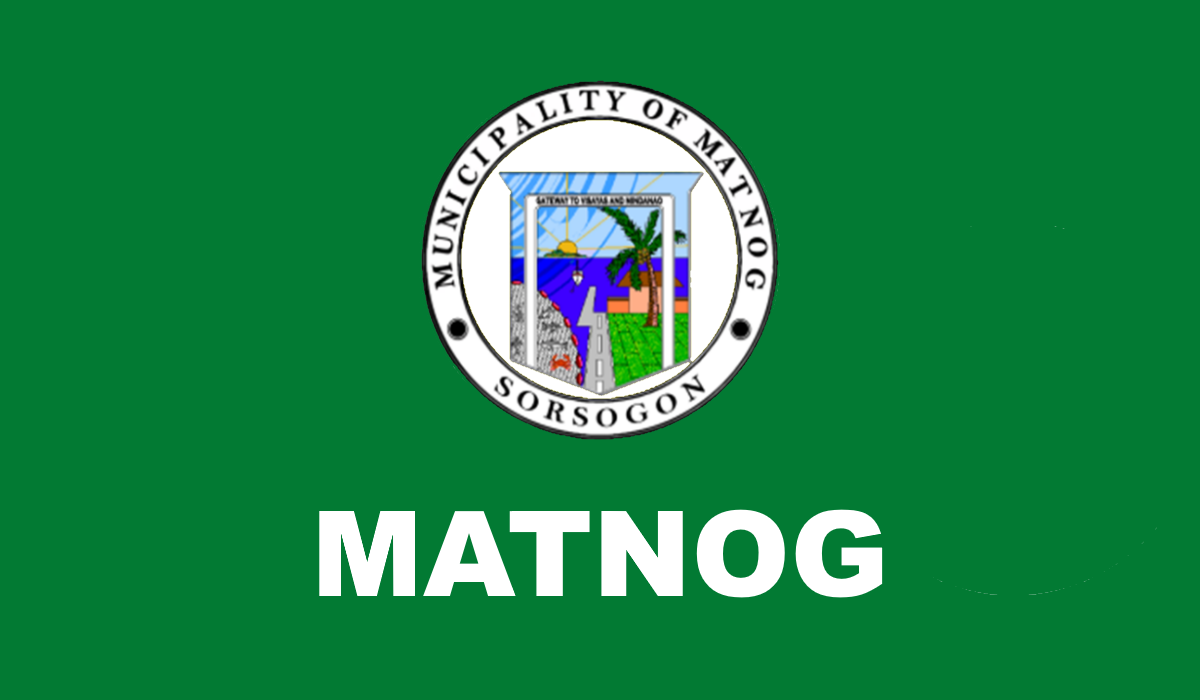
- Flag Seal
- Nicknames: Gateway of Luzon; Gateway to Visayas
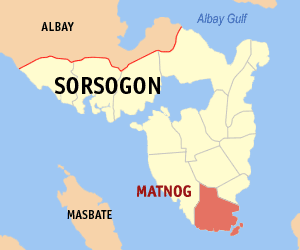
- Map of Sorsogon with Matnog highlighted
- Interactive map of Matnog
- Location within the Philippines
- Coordinates: 12°35′08″N 124°05′08″E
- Country: Philippines
- Region: Bicol Region
- Province: Sorsogon
- District: 2nd district
- Founded: May 17, 1800
- Barangays: 40 (see Barangays)

Government
  - Type: Sangguniang Bayan
  - Mayor: Bobet Lee Rodrigueza
  - Vice Mayor: Emilio Ubaldo III
  - Representative: Wowo Fortes
  - Municipal Council: Members: Celerina H. Ubaldo; Osmundo Garay; Edward Ruel Berlin, Jr.; Mercy G. Gata; Atorni Junnar Oro Garcia; Antonio S. Bilazon; Leopoldo Sabado Jr.; Joseph Alan Gacis
  - Electorate: 30,571 voters (2025)

Area
  - Total: 162.40 km^{2} (62.70 sq mi)
- Elevation: 49 m (161 ft)
- Highest elevation: 354 m (1,161 ft)
- Lowest elevation: 0 m (0 ft)

Population (2024 census)
  - Total: 42,444
  - Density: 261.35/km^{2} (676.91/sq mi)
  - Households: 9,455

Economy
  - Income class: 1st municipal income class
  - Poverty incidence: 40.25% (2023)
  - Revenue: ₱ 292.7 million (2024)
  - Assets: ₱ 456.3 million (2024)
  - Expenditure: ₱ 293.7 million (2024)
  - Liabilities: ₱ 261.8 million (2024)

Service provider
  - Electricity: Sorsogon 1 Electric Cooperative (SORECO 1)
- Time zone: UTC+8 (PST)
- ZIP code: 4708
- PSGC: 0506212000
- IDD : area code: +63 (0)56
- Native languages: Sorsogon language Tagalog

Matnog, officially the Municipality of Matnog (Waray Sorsogon: Bungto san Matnog; Waray: Bungto han Matnog, Tagalog: Bayan ng Matnog), is a municipality in the province of Sorsogon, Philippines and is the southernmost part of Luzon. According to the 2024 census, it has a population of 42,444 people.

The town's port is one of the busiest in the region, playing host to millions of people crossing the San Bernardino Strait to Northern Samar annually. It is the jump off point to Visayas and vice versa.

== Etymology ==
Local elders say that the name Matnog comes from the Bicol word "matonog", which means very audible that describes the loud sound of the waves. Some attribute the name to the sound of the gong used by early chieftains to call council meetings, while others link it to the noise of the tidal rip in the San Bernardino Strait.

== History ==
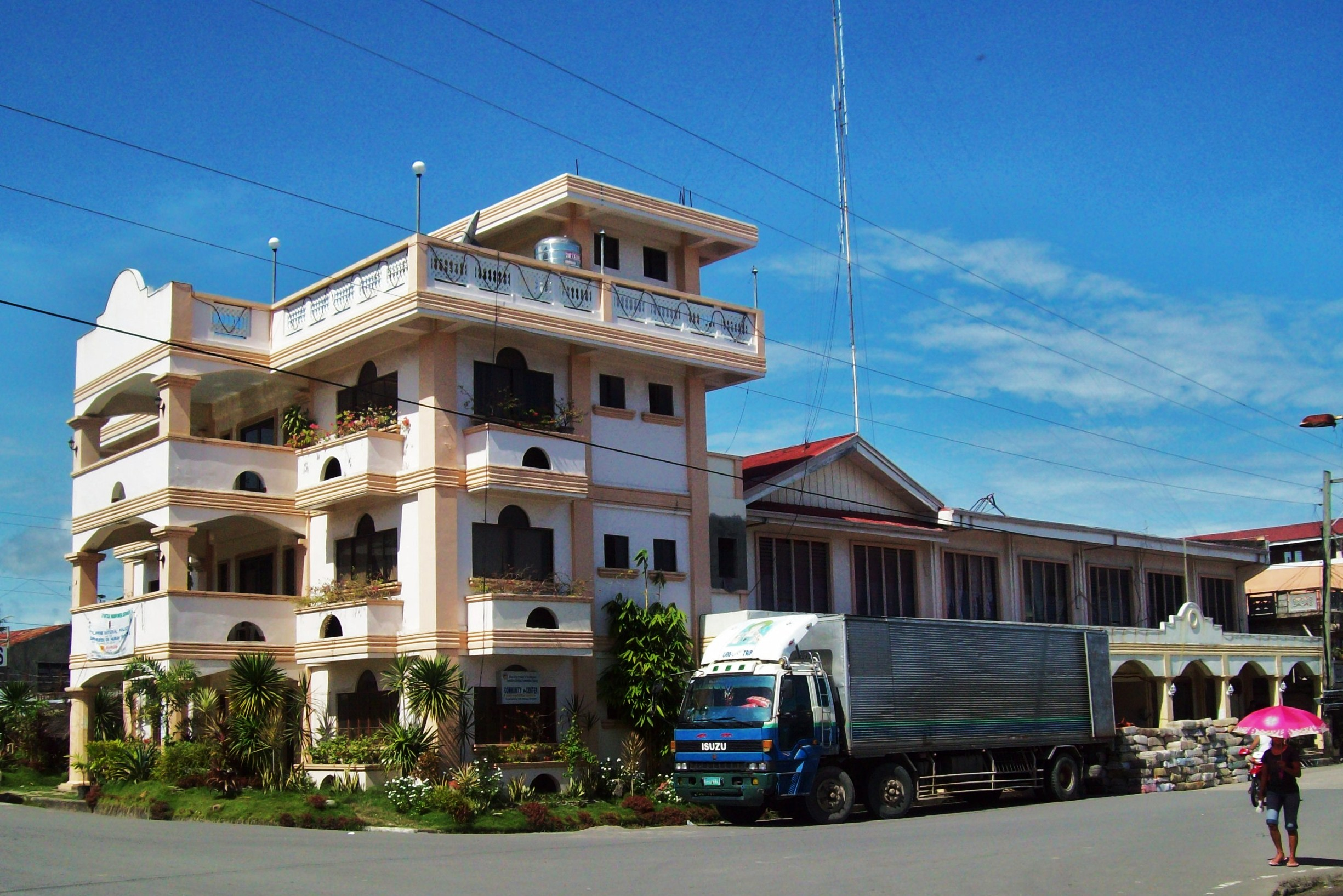
Old municipal hall of Matnog, built on the old Presidencia building

In 1785, Matnog became a barrio of Bulusan, with Juan Evangelista serving as its first head. Fifteen years later, it was designated as Puerto Civil. It later became a separate parish on November 21, 1963.

== Geography ==
Matnog is 65 kilometers (40 mi) from Sorsogon City and 646 kilometers (401 mi) from Manila.

=== Barangays ===
Matnog is politically subdivided into 40 barangays. Each barangay consists of puroks and some have sitios.

- Balocawe
- Banogao
- Banuang-daan
- Bariis
- Bolo
- Bon-Ot Dako (Big)
- Bon-Ot Saday (Small)
- Cabagahan
- Calayuan
- Calintaan
- Caloocan (Poblacion)
- Calpi
- Camachiles (Poblacion)
- Camcaman (Poblacion)
- Coron-coron
- Culasi
- Gadgaron
- Genablan Occidental
- Genablan Oriental
- Hid-hid
- Laboy
- Lajong
- Mambajog
- Manjumlad
- Manurabi
- Naburacan
- Paghuliran
- Pange
- Pawa
- Poropandan
- Santa Isabel
- Sinalmacan
- Sinang-Atan
- Sinebaran
- Sisigon
- Sua
- Sulangan
- Tablac (Poblacion)
- Tabunan (Poblacion)
- Tugas
- Para sa Training

=== Climate ===
Climate data for Matnog, Sorsogon
| Month | Jan | Feb | Mar | Apr | May | Jun | Jul | Aug | Sep | Oct | Nov | Dec | Year |
|---|---|---|---|---|---|---|---|---|---|---|---|---|---|
| Mean daily maximum °C (°F) | 27 (81) | 28 (82) | 29 (84) | 31 (88) | 31 (88) | 30 (86) | 29 (84) | 29 (84) | 29 (84) | 29 (84) | 29 (84) | 28 (82) | 29 (84) |
| Mean daily minimum °C (°F) | 22 (72) | 21 (70) | 22 (72) | 23 (73) | 24 (75) | 25 (77) | 25 (77) | 25 (77) | 25 (77) | 24 (75) | 23 (73) | 23 (73) | 24 (74) |
| Average precipitation mm (inches) | 65 (2.6) | 44 (1.7) | 42 (1.7) | 39 (1.5) | 87 (3.4) | 150 (5.9) | 184 (7.2) | 153 (6.0) | 163 (6.4) | 154 (6.1) | 127 (5.0) | 100 (3.9) | 1,308 (51.4) |
| Average rainy days | 13.9 | 9.2 | 11.0 | 12.5 | 19.6 | 24.3 | 26.5 | 25.0 | 25.5 | 24.4 | 19.4 | 15.1 | 226.4 |
Source: Meteoblue

== Demographics ==
Population census of Matnog
| Year | Pop. | ±% p.a. |
|---|---|---|
| 1903 | 2,457 | — |
| 1918 | 4,437 | +4.02% |
| 1939 | 10,119 | +4.00% |
| 1948 | 12,036 | +1.95% |
| 1960 | 15,570 | +2.17% |
| 1970 | 20,330 | +2.70% |
| 1975 | 20,680 | +0.34% |
| 1980 | 24,193 | +3.19% |
| 1990 | 25,957 | +0.71% |
| 1995 | 29,309 | +2.30% |
| 2000 | 32,712 | +2.38% |
| 2007 | 34,517 | +0.74% |
| 2010 | 37,641 | +3.20% |
| 2015 | 41,101 | +1.69% |
| 2020 | 41,989 | +0.45% |
| 2024 | 42,444 | +0.26% |
Source: Philippine Statistics Authority

The native people that settled in Matnog are the Agta, Tabangon, and Cimaron Tribe.

== Economy ==
Poverty incidence of Matnog (%)

Source: Philippine Statistics Authority

== Transportation ==
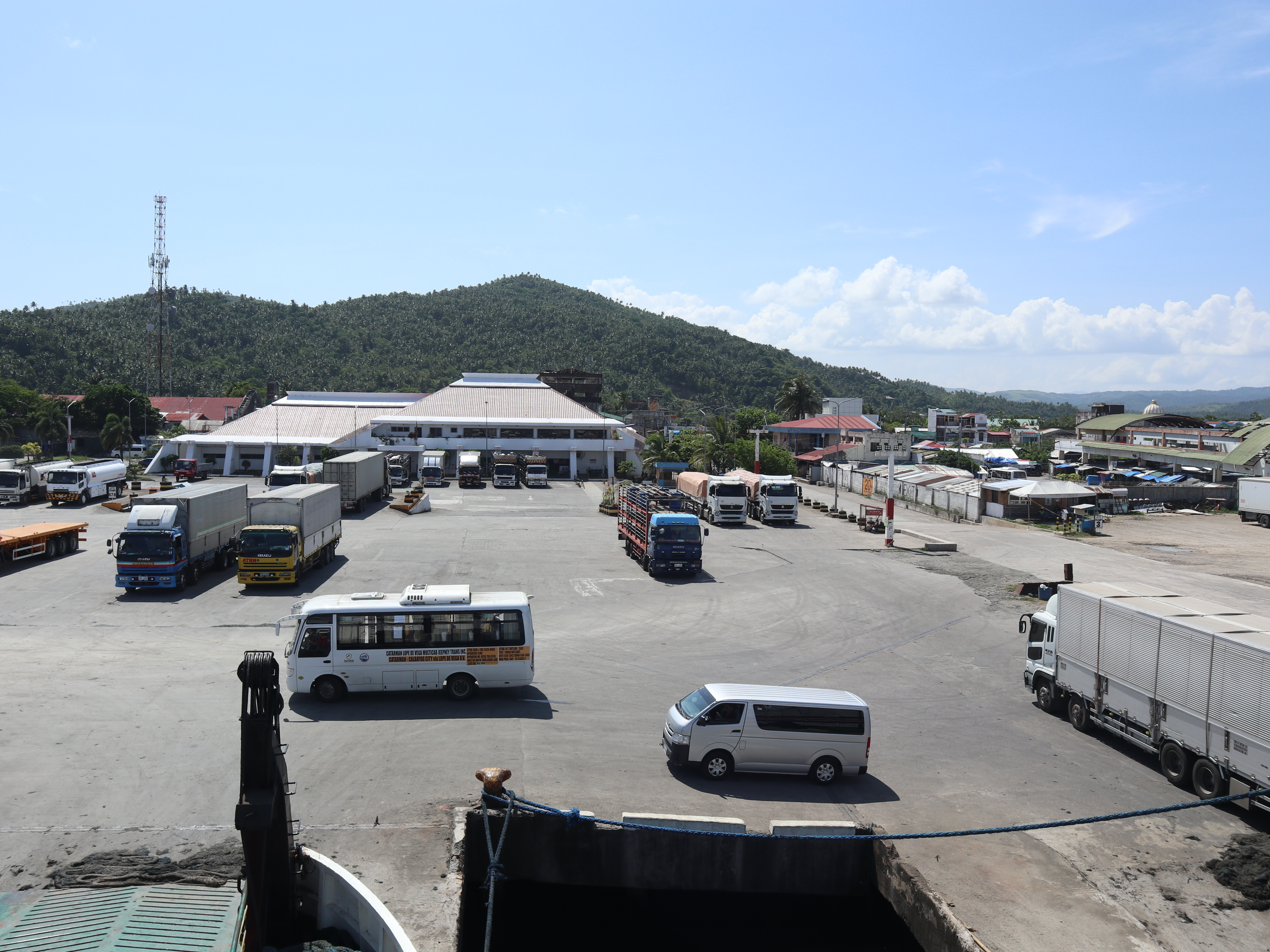
Matnog Port

Transportation includes buses going to and from Metro Manila and Bulan and ferries going to and from Allen, Northern Samar.

In order to spur development in the municipality, The Toll Regulatory Board declared Toll Road 5 the extension of South Luzon Expressway. A 420-kilometer (260 mi), four-lane expressway starting from the terminal point of the now under construction SLEX Toll Road 4 at Barangay Mayao in Lucena, Quezon, to Matnog, Sorsogon, near the Matnog Ferry Terminal. On August 25, 2020, San Miguel Corporation announced that they will invest the project which will reduce travel time from Lucena to Matnog from 9 hours to 5.5 hours.

== Education ==
The Matnog Schools District Office governs all educational institutions within the municipality. It oversees the management and operations of all private and public, from primary to secondary schools.

=== Primary and elementary schools ===
- Balocawe Elementary School
- Banogao Elementary School
- Banuang-Daan Elementary School
- Bolo Elementary School
- Bon-ot (Big) Elementary School
- Bon-ot (Small) Elementary School
- Cabagahan Elementary School
- Calayuan Elementary School
- Calintaan Elementary School
- Calpi Elementary School
- Coron-Coron Elementary School
- Culasi Elementary School
- Gadgaron Elementary School
- Genablan Occidental Elementary School
- Genablan Or. Elementary School
- Hidhid Elementary School
- Jose C. Frencillo Elementary School
- Laboy Elementary School
- Lajong Elementary School
- Mambajog Elementary School
- Manjumlad Elementary School
- Manurabi Elementary School
- Matnog Central School
- Matnog Seventh Day Adventist Elementary School
- Paghuliran Elementary School
- Pange Elementary School
- Pawa Elementary School
- Poropandan Elementary School
- Sinang-Atan Elementary School
- Sinalmacan Elementary School
- Sinebaran Elementary School
- Sta. Isabel Elementary School
- Sua Elementary School
- Tablac Elementary School
- Tugas Elementary School
- Vicente Dorotan Elementary School

=== Secondary schools ===
- Culasi National High School
- Matnog National High School
- Pacific View Academy
- Sisigon Integrated School
- Sua High School
- Tiong Hen So Memorial High School

== Gallery ==
New Matnog Municipal Hall

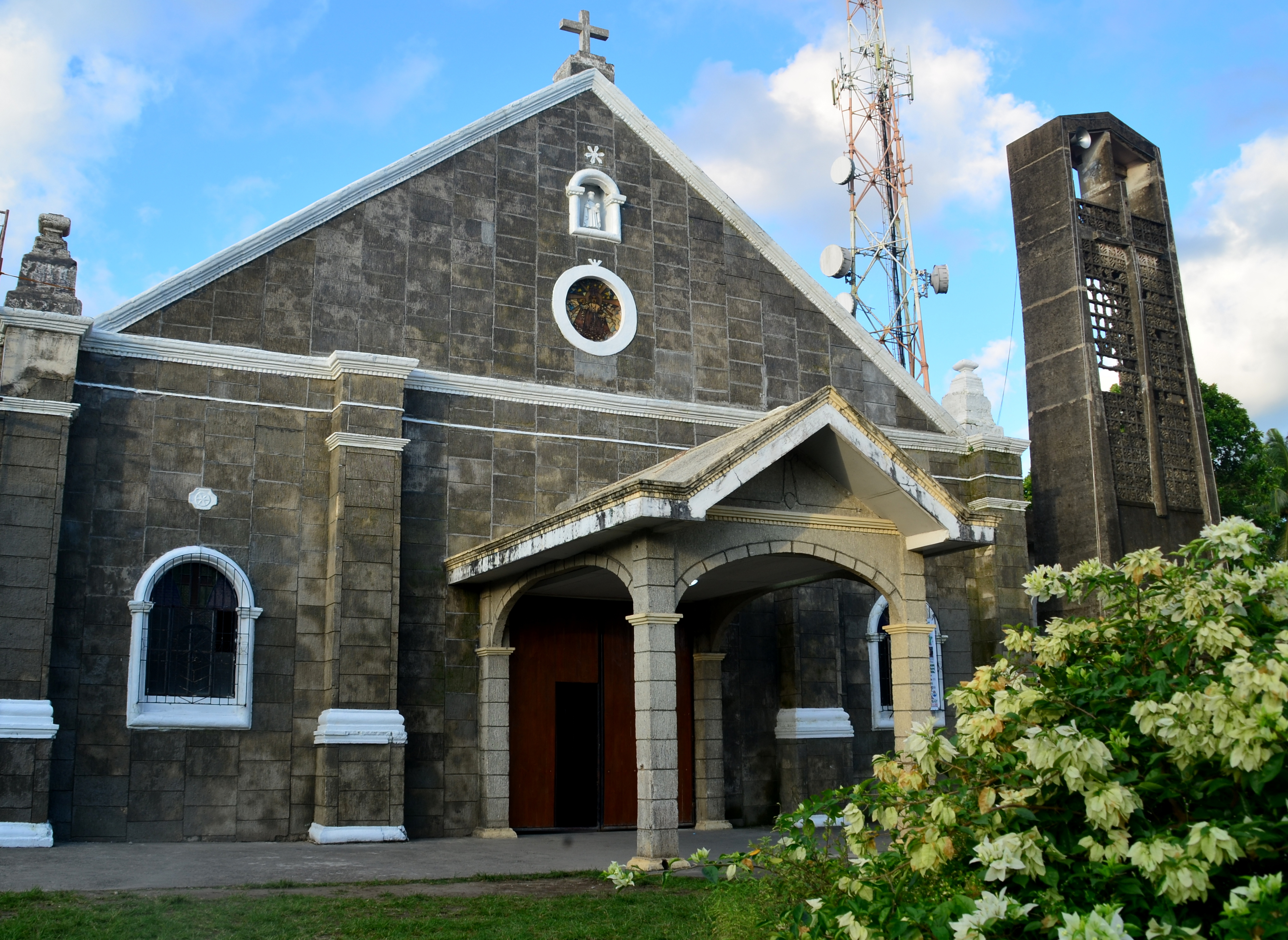
Matnog Church

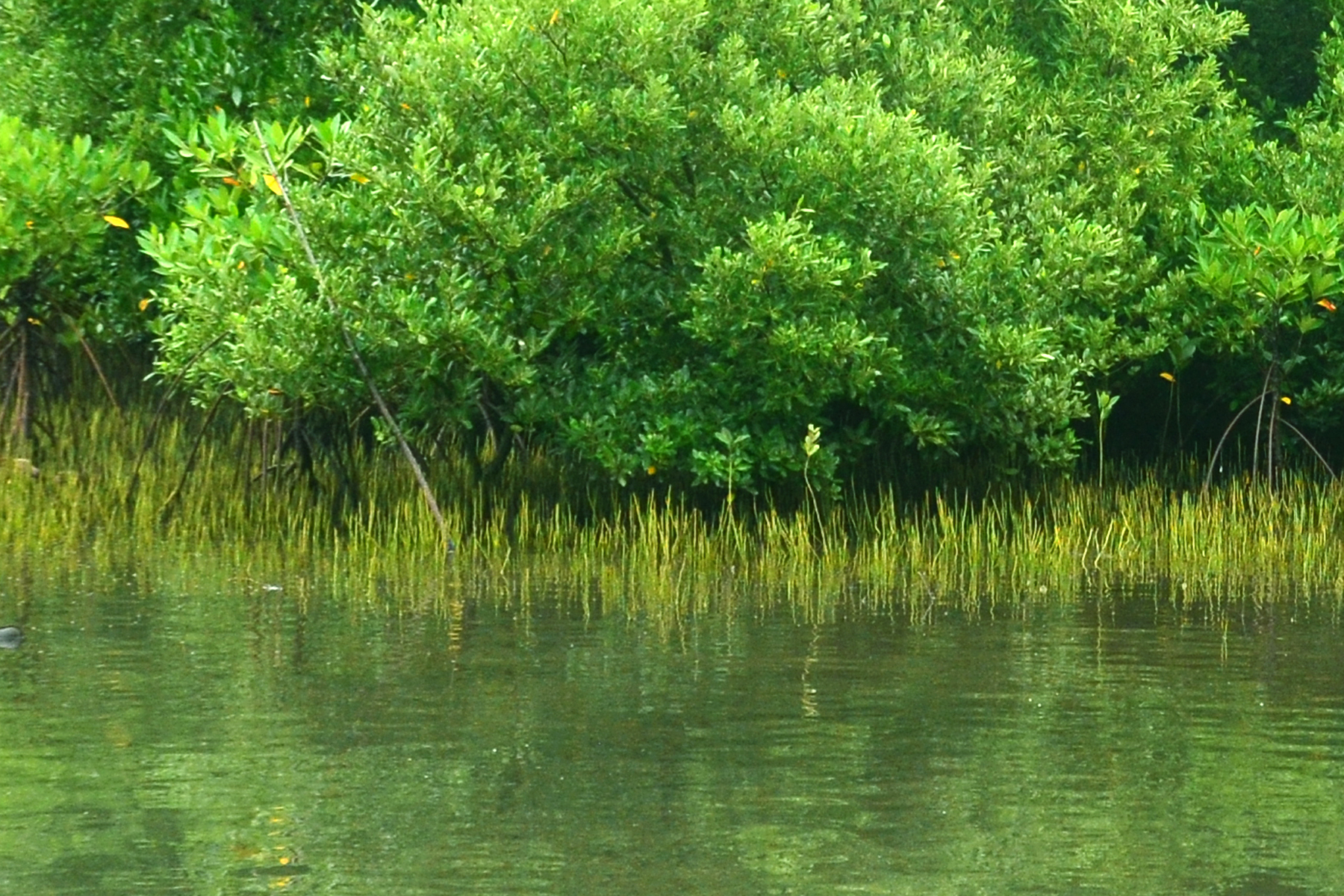
Mangroves in Brgy. Mambajog

Subic Beach

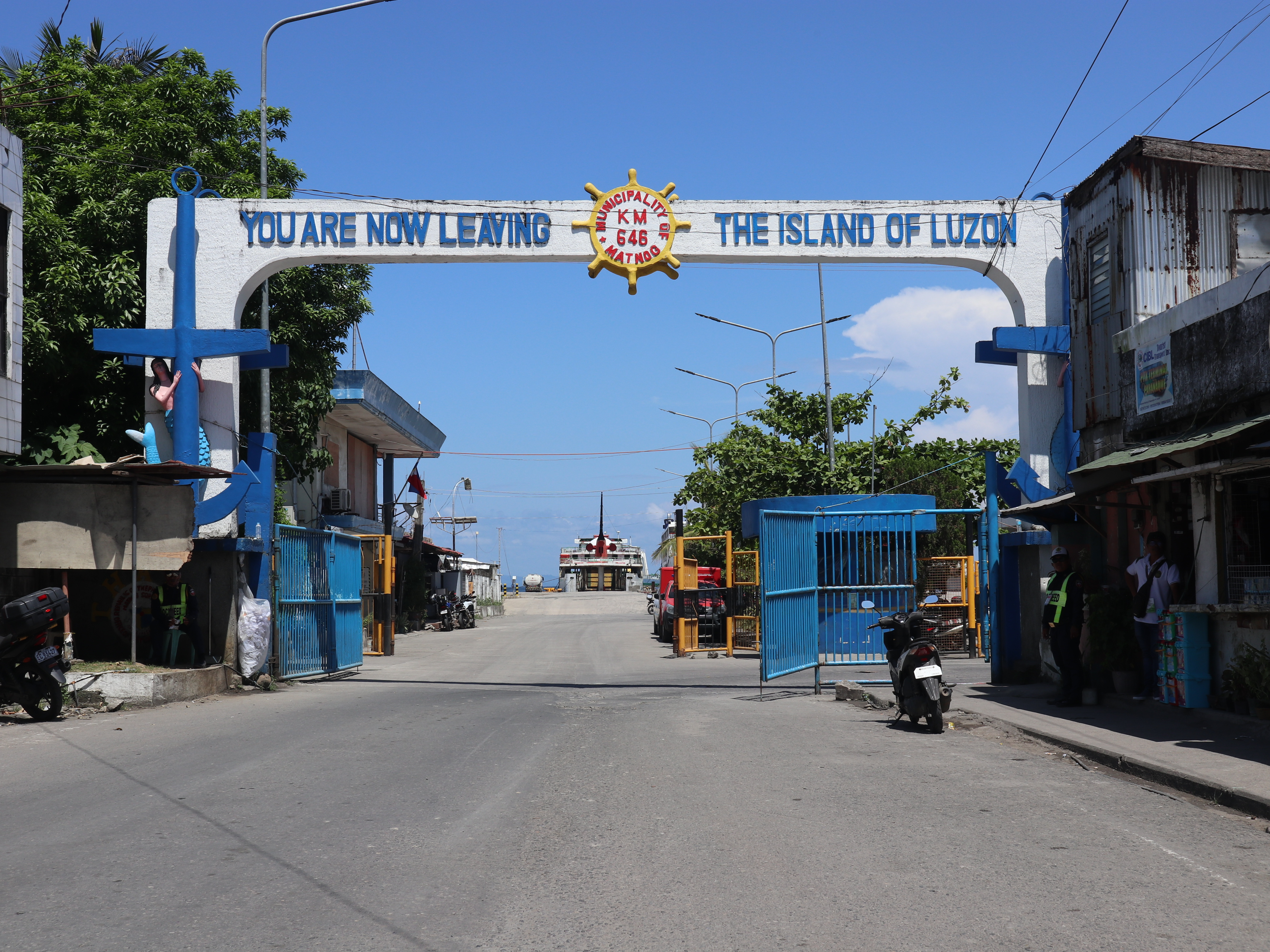
Matnog Port arch

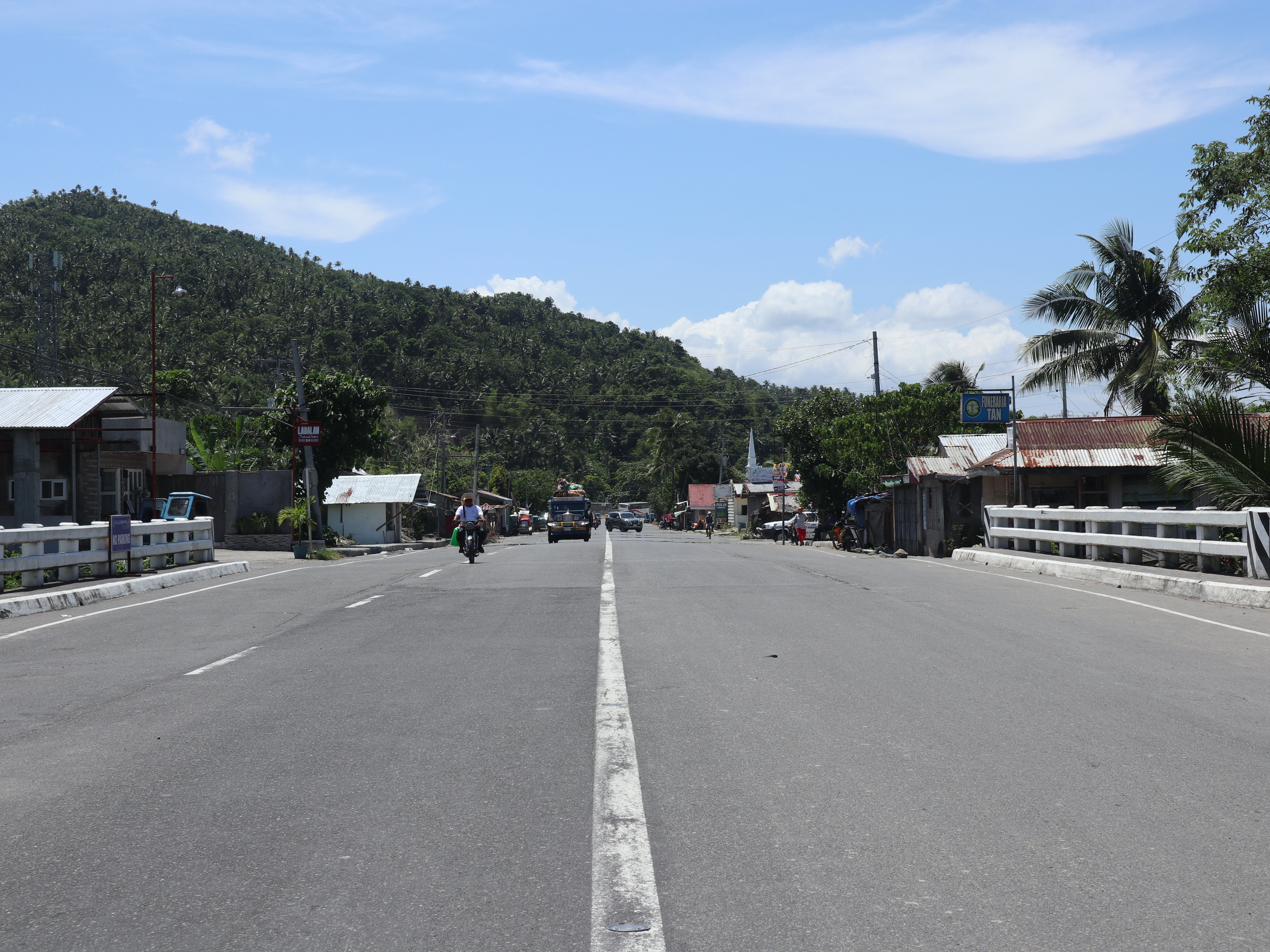
Pan-Philippine Highway in Camcaman

Tikling Island
