= Bulan, Sorsogon =

Municipality in Sorsogon, Philippines

Bulan The Home of Padaraw Festival
- Municipality
- Municipality of Bulan
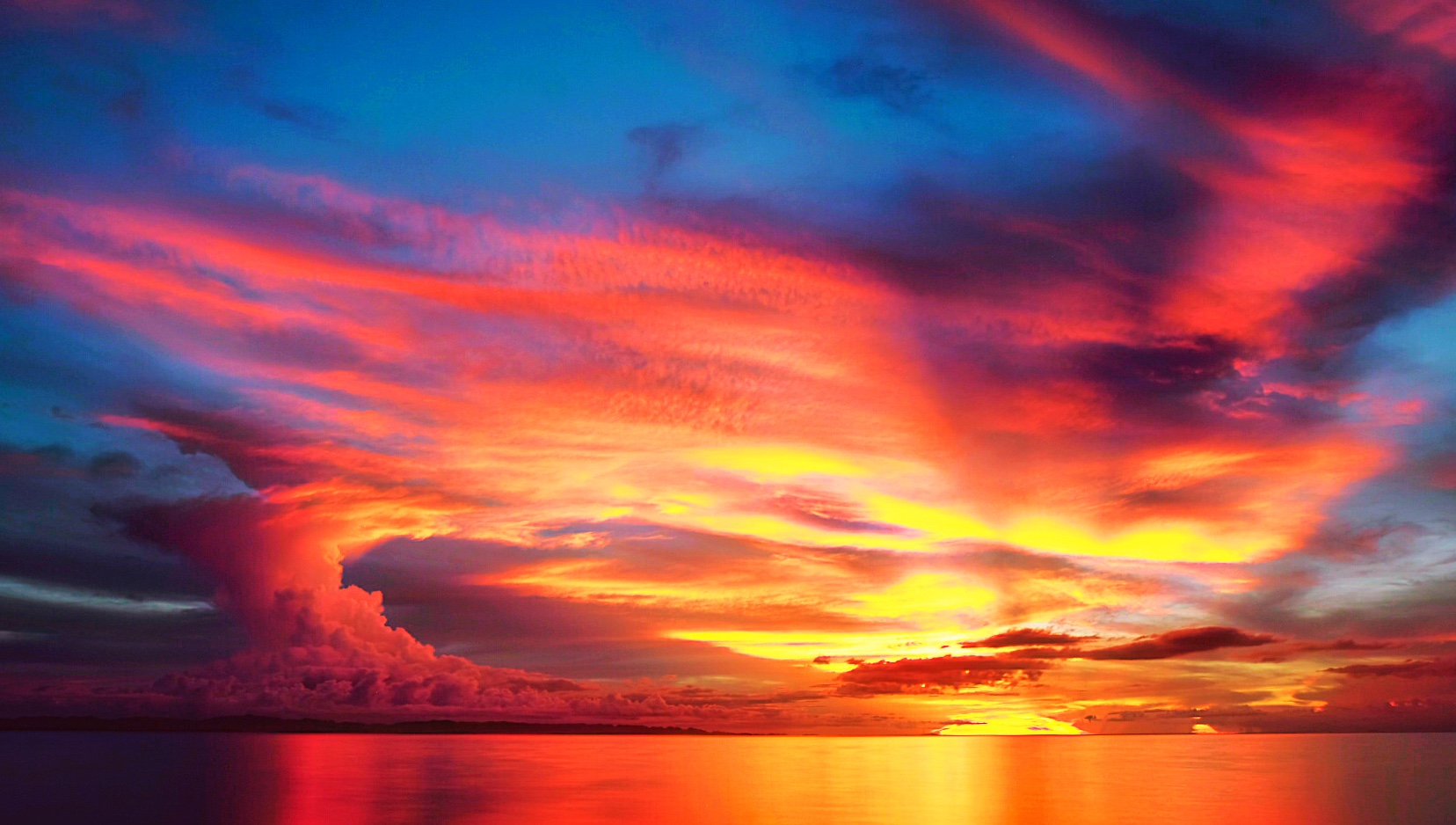
- Sunset at Ticao Pass

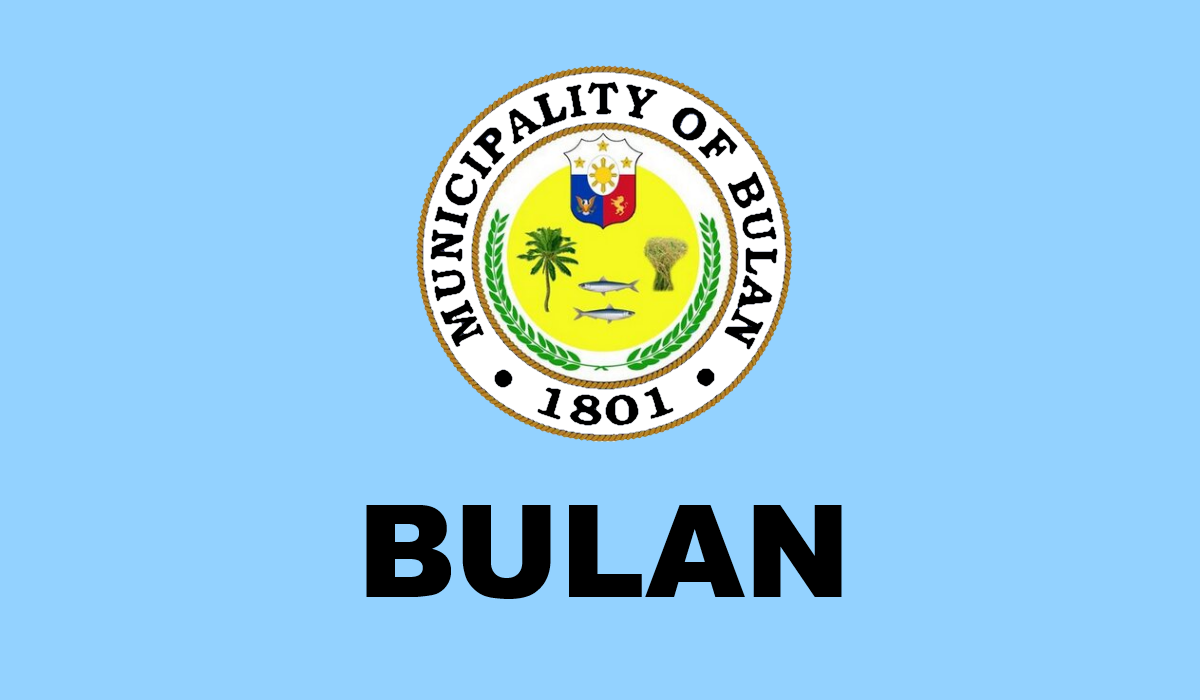
- Flag
- Nickname: Fishing Capital of Bicol
- Motto: "Unhan Bulan"
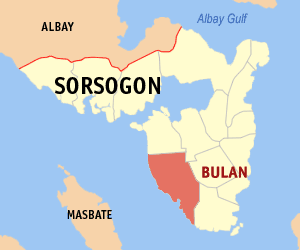
- Map of Sorsogon with Bulan highlighted
- Interactive map of Bulan
- Location within the Philippines
- Coordinates: 12°40′11″N 123°52′33″E
- Country: Philippines
- Region: Bicol Region
- Province: Sorsogon
- District: 2nd district
- Barangays: 63 (see Barangays)

Government
  - Type: Sangguniang Bayan
  - Mayor: Romeo A. Gordola
  - Vice Mayor: Chezka Mae B. Robles
  - Representative: Vacant
  - Municipal Council: Members: Joefrey O. Azur; Chezka Mae B. Robles; Renato D. Guban; Olaf S. Gotladera; Excel G. Zuñiga; Mildred H. Pelagio; Augusto G. Geronga; Tito G. Guelas
  - Electorate: 68,905 voters (2025)

Area
  - Total: 196.96 km^{2} (76.05 sq mi)
- Elevation: 8.0 m (26.2 ft)
- Highest elevation: 190 m (620 ft)
- Lowest elevation: 0 m (0 ft)

Population (2024 census)
  - Total: 106,919
  - Density: 542.85/km^{2} (1,406.0/sq mi)
  - Households: 23,082

Economy
  - Income class: 1st municipal income class
  - Poverty incidence: 36.13% (2023)
  - Revenue: ₱ 448.4 million (2024)
  - Assets: ₱ 1,474 million (2024)
  - Expenditure: ₱ 401.9 million (2024)
  - Liabilities: ₱ 350.5 million (2024)

Service provider
  - Electricity: Sorsogon 1 Electric Cooperative (SORECO 1)
- Time zone: UTC+8 (PST)
- ZIP code: 4706
- PSGC: 0506203000
- IDD : area code: +63 (0)56
- Native languages: - Bisakol (Southern Sorsogon); - Tagalog
- Website: www.bulan.gov.ph

Bulan, officially the Municipality of Bulan (Waray Sorsogon: Bungto san Bulan; Waray: Bungto han Bulan; Tagalog: Bayan ng Bulan), is a municipality in the province of Sorsogon, Philippines. According to the 2024 census, it has a population of 106,919 people, making it the most populated town in the province.

Bulan is being groomed to be the next city of Bicol province given its first class municipality status with an estimated population of 120,000, 196 square kilometers land area and an annual regular income of not less than P200M Bulan. The town is said to propose a cityhood bill in the near future.

It is also one of the Top Five Municipalities with the Highest Operating Income in Bicol, ISO Accredited LGU, with Seal of Good Financial Housekeeping from DILG.

The year 1818 census shows that Bulan had 714 native families and 16 Spanish-Filipino families.

== Geography ==
The Municipality of Bulan is located at the south-westernmost tip of the Bicol Peninsula of the island of Luzon. It has an area of exactly 20,094 hectares and is the terminal and burgeoning center of trade and commerce of its neighboring towns. It comprises fifty-five (55) barangays and eight (8) zones and is populated by people of diversified origin.

This municipality is bounded on the north by the Municipality of Magallanes, on the east by the municipalities of Juban and Irosin, on the south by the Municipality of Matnog, and on the west by Ticao Pass. It has a distance of 667 kilometres (414 mi) from Manila, 63 kilometres (39 mi) from the province's capital Sorsogon City, 20 kilometres (12 mi) from the town of Irosin and 30 kilometres (19 mi) from the town of Matnog.

=== Barangays ===
Bulan is politically subdivided into 63 barangays. Each barangay consists of puroks and some have sitios.

- A. Bonifacio (Tinurilan)
- Abad Santos (Kambal)
- Aguinaldo (Lipata Dako)
- Antipolo
- Aquino (Imelda)
- Bical
- Beguin
- Bonga
- Butag
- Cadandanan
- Calomagon
- Calpi
- Cocok-Cabitan
- Daganas
- Danao
- Dolos
- E. Quirino (Pinangomhan)
- Fabrica
- G. Del Pilar (Tanga)
- Gate
- Inararan
- J. Gerona (Biton)
- J.P. Laurel (Pon-od)
- Jamorawon
- Libertad (Calle Putol)
- Lajong
- Magsaysay (Bongog)
- Managa-naga
- Marinab
- Nasuje
- Montecalvario
- N. Roque (Calayugan)
- Namo
- Obrero
- Osmeña (Lipata Saday)
- Otavi
- Padre Diaz
- Palale
- Quezon (Cabarawan)
- R. Gerona (Butag)
- Recto
- Roxas (Busay)
- Sagrada
- San Francisco (Polot)
- San Isidro (Cabugaan)
- San Juan Bag-o
- San Juan Daan
- San Rafael (Togbongon)
- San Ramon
- San Vicente
- Santa Remedios
- Santa Teresita (Trece)
- Sigad
- Somagongsong
- Tarhan
- Taromata
- Zone 1 (Ilawod)
- Zone 2 (Sabang)
- Zone 3 (Central)
- Zone 4 (Central Business District)
- Zone 5 (Canipaan)
- Zone 6 (Baybay)
- Zone 7 (Iraya)
- Zone 8 (Loyo)

=== Climate ===
Climate data for Bulan, Sorsogon
Month	Jan	Feb	Mar	Apr	May	Jun	Jul	Aug	Sep	Oct	Nov	Dec	Year
Mean daily maximum °C (°F)	27 (81)	28 (82)	29 (84)	31 (88)	31 (88)	30 (86)	29 (84)	29 (84)	29 (84)	29 (84)	29 (84)	28 (82)	29 (84)
Mean daily minimum °C (°F)	22 (72)	21 (70)	22 (72)	23 (73)	24 (75)	25 (77)	25 (77)	25 (77)	25 (77)	24 (75)	23 (73)	23 (73)	24 (74)
Average precipitation mm (inches)	65 (2.6)	44 (1.7)	42 (1.7)	39 (1.5)	87 (3.4)	150 (5.9)	184 (7.2)	153 (6.0)	163 (6.4)	154 (6.1)	127 (5.0)	100 (3.9)	1,308 (51.4)
Average rainy days	13.9	9.2	11.0	12.5	19.6	24.3	26.5	25.0	25.5	24.4	19.4	15.1	226.4
Source: Meteoblue (modeled/calculated data, not measured locally)

== Demographics ==
Population census of Bulan
Year	Pop.	±% p.a.
1903	13,431	—
1918	19,268	+2.44%
1939	29,414	+2.03%
1948	37,231	+2.65%
1960	46,520	+1.87%
1970	54,180	+1.53%
1975	56,013	+0.67%
1980	60,911	+1.69%
1990	66,450	+0.87%
1995	74,219	+2.09%
2000	82,688	+2.34%
2007	91,730	+1.44%
2010	93,943	+0.87%
2015	100,076	+1.21%
2020	105,190	+1.05%
2024	106,919	+0.39%
Source: Philippine Statistics Authority

== Economy ==
Poverty incidence of Bulan (%)

Source: Philippine Statistics Authority

Residents of Bulan are now looking forward to its city hood because of its rapid-economic growth considering the fact that it is cited as the richest municipality in the province and 5th among the 1st class municipalities in Bicol Region with an average annual income of PHP 58.8M (2009). If it happens, Bulan will be the second city in the province and will be the 8th in the region.

Major exports of this town are from its coastal waters, agricultural lands produce rice, copra, abaca fiber. Most of the revenues come from the fishing port of Bulan and businesses.

=== Development areas ===
Commercial businesses are heavily concentrated in the town center. The expansion of the commercial area under the Comprehensive Land Use Plan (CLUP) has been approved, stretching from the Poblacion Zone Business District to Zone 7, Barangay Aquino, and extending to Barangay Fabrica. This will form the new Central Business District (CBD) of the town, aimed at alleviating traffic congestion and reducing the burden on commercial establishments in the downtown area. The expansion also includes an 80-meter radius on both sides of the National Highway.

Due to Bulan's rapidly growing economy and revenue, alongside its large population growth, the old and unfinished Bulan airport will start construction soon and will serve as the gateway to the province of Sorsogon.

Bulan port also will undergo rehabilitation so locals would not have to go to Matnog to access the Visayas and Masbate Area.

=== Growth ===
Although poverty is still high in Bulan, the government has improve people's lives. Bulan is ranked in the Top 10 richest municipalities out of 107 Municipalities in the Bicol Region, from 5th to 2nd fastest growing as of 2021 with an average annual income of 145.60M (41.91% increase) after Aroroy, Masbate.

== Infrastracture ==
=== Telecommunications ===
Bulan has fixed landline phones and fiber internet from BTTI (Bicol Telephone and Telegraph, Inc.). Mobile or cellular networks are Globe, Smart and Dito Telecommunications Companies.

== Education ==
There are two schools district offices which govern all educational institutions within the municipality. They oversee the management and operations of all private and public, from primary to secondary schools. These are the:

- Bulan North Schools District
- Bulan South Schools District

=== Primary and elementary schools ===
- Abad Santos Elementary School
- Aguinaldo Elementary School
- Alberto de Castro Elementary School
- Antipolo Elementary School
- Beguin Elementary School
- Benzon Educational House and Tutorial Centre
- Bical Elementary School
- BLISS Elementary School
- Bonifacio Elementary School
- Bulan Christian Learning Center
- Bulan North Central School (A)
- Bulan North Central School (B)
- Bulan South Central School
- Bunga Elementary School
- Butag Elementary School
- C.M. Recto Elementary School
- Cadandanan Elementary School
- Calomagon Elementary School
- Calpi Elementary School
- Cocok-Cabitan Elementary School
- Daganas Elementary School
- Danao Elementary School
- Dolos Elementary School
- E. Quirino Elementary School
- Fabrica Elementary School
- G. Del Pilar Elementary School
- Gabod Elementary School
- Gate Elementary School
- Ilawod West Elementary School
- Immaculate Concepcion Academy
- Inararan Elementary School
- J. Gerona Elementary School
- J.P. Laurel Elementary School
- Jamorawon Elementary School
- La Academia dela Immaculada Concepcion de Bulan (Parish Immaculate Concepcion Kinder School)
- Lahong Elementary School
- Little Missionary Learning Center
- M.A. Roxas Elementary School
- M.G. De Castro Elementary School (Magsaysay Elementary School)
- Marinab Elementary School
- Monte Calvario Elementary School
- N. Roque Elementary School
- Namo Elementary School
- Nasuje Elementary School
- New Jerusalem School
- Obrero Elementary School
- Osmena Elementary School
- Otavi Elementary School
- Padre Diaz Elementary School
- Palale Elementary School
- QUEZON Elementary School
- R. Gerona Elementary School
- Sabang Elementary School
- Sagrada Elementary School
- San Francisco Elementary School
- San Isidro Elementary School
- San Juan Bago Elementary School
- San Juan Daan Elementary School
- San Rafael Elementary School
- San Ramon Elementary School
- San Vicente Elementary School
- Sigad Elementary School
- Somagongsong Elementary School
- St. Bonaventure Academy (Butag)
- St. Bonaventure Academy (Estabaya St.)
- St. Louise de Marillac School
- Sta. Remedios Elementary School
- Sta. Teresita Elementary School
- San Jose Elementary School
- Taromata I Elementary School
- Taromata II Elementary School

=== Secondary schools ===
Bulan has many secondary educational institutions. The largest public high school is Bulan National High School. Formerly, it was the Bulan High School/Bulan Vocational High School, before the former was converted into Sorsogon State College Bulan Campus. BNHS has satellite Campuses at Barangays Otavi, Beguin, J.P. Laurel, San Juan Bag-o. There is also a Secondary School in San Francisco, one of the biggest Barangay of Bulan. The San Francisco National High School. On the coastal area, Quezon National High School, is one and only coastal high school in the area. Where students from nearby barangays (Osmeña, Aguinaldo, Sagrada and even Coron-Coron & Sua - part of Municipality of Matnog, use to send their students.

There are various private secondary schools. The St. Louise De Marillac School (Formerly Colegio de la Inmaculada Concepcion) a Catholic school run by the Daughters of Charity religious congregation, Immaculate Conception Academy of Bulan (Formerly Immaculate Conception Learning Center) a Catholic School, Saint Bonaventure Academy of Butag, the Southern Luzon Institute-Kenerino Ramirez Asuncion Memorial School (SLI-KRAMS) were the oldest school in Bulan, Solis Institute of Technology, and A.G. Villaroya Technological Foundation Institute.

- A.G. Villaroya Tech. Foundation Institute
- Beguin High School
- Bulan National High School
- Butag School of Fisheries
- Cadandanan National High School
- Danao National High School
- Faustino G. Glua High School
- Gate National High School
- J. P. Laurel High School
- Quezon National High School
- San Francisco National High School
- San Isidro National High School
- San Juan Bag-o High School
- Solis Institute of Technology
- Southern Luzon Institute

=== Higher educational institutions ===
- A.G. Villaroya (Post-Secondary courses only)
- R.G. De Castro Colleges (formerly Quezon Academy)
- SLI-KRAMS
- Solis Institute of Technology
- Sorsogon State University - Bulan Campus

=== Alternative Learning System ===
Aside from the formal education system, a parallel alternative learning system program is incorporated in the education system to provide a viable alternative to the existing formal education structure. It encompasses both the non-formal and informal sources of knowledge and skills such as those acquired at home, the church, media, environment or even the life itself and span the pre-literacy to higher skills continuum.

There are two major existing programs implemented. 1) Basic Literacy Program 2)Accreditation and Equivalency (A & E). ALS implementers such as Mobile Teachers and District ALS Coordinators were the one administer the implementation of the programs. It is intended for Out-of-School Youth and Adults who are unschooled or school drop-out. For more inquiries look for Bulan South and Bulan North Districts ALS implementers.

== Notable personalities ==
- Liliosa Rapi Hilao - Filipino student journalist and activist
- Vicente de Vera - Filipino lawyer and politician
