= SM City San Fernando Downtown =

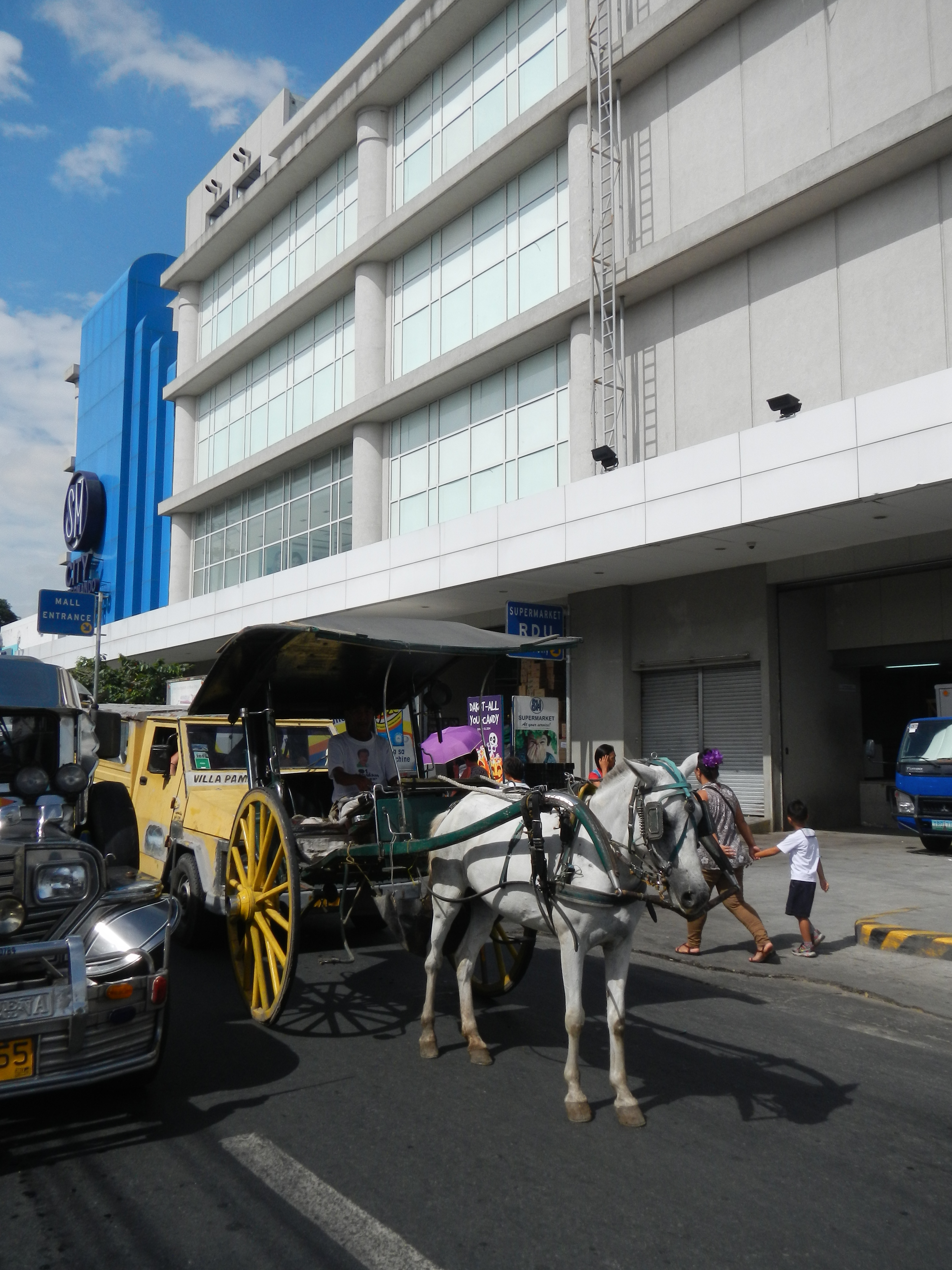
- Location: V. Tiomico Street cor. Consunji Street, Downtown Heritage District, Brgy. Sto. Rosario, San Fernando, Pampanga, Philippines
- Coordinates: 15°01′40″N 120°41′33″E
- Opened: July 20, 2012; 14 years ago
- Previous names: SM City San Fernando (2012)
- Developer: SM Prime Holdings
- Manager: SM Prime Holdings
- Owner: Henry Sy Sr.
- Num. of stores: 100+ shops
- Num. of anchor tenants: 2
- Floor area: 42,625 m^{2} (458,810 sq ft)
- Parking: 300
- Website: SM City San Fernando Downtown

SM City San Fernando Downtown (formerly known as SM City San Fernando on its first few months of operations in 2012), is a shopping mall owned and operated by SM Prime Holdings. It is located along V. Tiomico Street and Consunji Street in the Downtown Heritage District, Barangay Santo Rosario, San Fernando, Pampanga. It is the third SM supermall in the province of Pampanga after SM City Pampanga in San Fernando and Mexico, Pampanga and SM City Clark in the Clark Freeport Zone, Angeles City. The mall has a total gross floor area of 42,625 square metres (458,810 sq ft). It features more than 100 shops.

== Location ==
SM City San Fernando Downtown is located along V. Tiomico Street and Consunji Street in the Downtown Heritage District, Barangay Santo Rosario, City of San Fernando, Pampanga, Philippines. The mall is adjacent to the Metropolitan Cathedral and the city hall of San Fernando.

== Architecture ==
Mall sign and entrance in 2024

The mall opened on July 20, 2012. Its distinctive exterior design complies with the architectural theme of a heritage area, as mandated by the local government of the city. The seven-storey mall has a SM Department Store and an SM Supermarket as anchor tenants, and a three-level parking building that is directly connected to the mall.

== Tenants and features ==
SM City San Fernando Downtown features SM Supermarket and SM Store as tenants.

It featured 3 cinemas until it was closed in March 2020, due to the COVID-19 pandemic in the Philippines. The former cinemas remain intact for private screenings and reservations, focusing on SM City Pampanga's cinemas.

Preceded by SM City Consolacion	44th SM Supermall; 2012	Succeeded by SM City General Santos
