= Yashano Mall =

Shopping mall in Legazpi, Albay

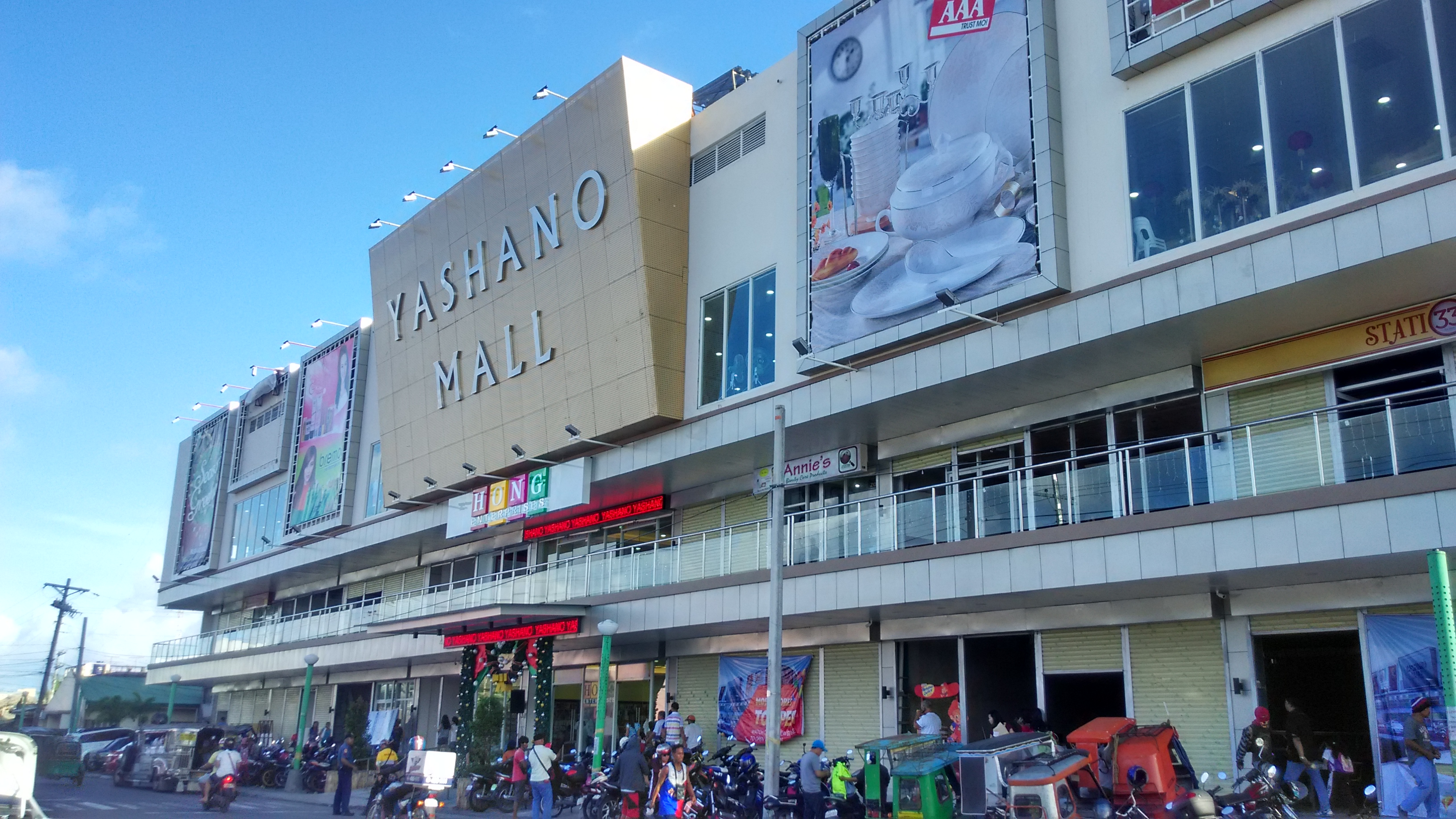
- Facade of Yashano Mall
- Location: Bitano, Legazpi, Albay Philippines
- Coordinates: 13.1459531°N 123.7460629°E
- Opened: November 27, 2015; 10 years ago
- Developer: HONG Enterprises
- Floor area: 32,000 m^{2} (340,000 sq ft)
- Floors: 4
- Website: www.facebook.com/YashanoMall

Yashano Mall is a 4-storey shopping mall in Legazpi, Albay. It houses at least 30 stalls, with 8,000 m^{2} (86,000 sq ft), and was the first commercial mall in the city to have a LED wall used for commercial advertising.

== History ==
Yashano Mall was opened on November 27, 2015 with Gerald Anderson as the mall's first celebrity guest. It is one of HONG Enterprises' biggest investment along with Gregorian Mall which follows to open a year after. Its one of two mall openings in Legazpi along with Ayala Mall Legazpi - Liberty City Center (a business venture of LCC Malls and Ayala Land)

HONG Enterprises is a Taiwanese family business which is based in Legazpi, Albay. They are also the operators of HONG Enterprises Stores which has several branches across Albay. Their stores offers cheap Taiwanese and Filipino products. Currently, the enterprise is owned by Sheryl Hong.

However, at the middle of its construction in February 2015, Yashano Mall came to a controversy when the shopping mall was allegedly constructed without appropriate building permit. It was first noted when required billboard that should indicate the building permit number and Environmental Clearance Certificate (ECC) which is granted through the Department of Environment and Natural Resources and the City Engineering Office was conspicuously absent at the construction site.

The allegations was exposed by Legazpi Councilor Rolly Rosal who lambasted the city engineering office for allowing its construction for almost a half a year now in violation and total disregard of certain provisions of the Building Code of the Philippines. Rosal who is the City Council's Committee on Public Works and Utilities noted that construction workers in the site are seen to be not wearing the required protective gears such as helmet.

Despite controversies, the mall continues to finalize the structure up until it opened in November.

The mall opened some Legazpi's first. One of which was the Figaro Coffee, a Filipino chain of coffee shop that started in Metro Manila. Then the Bacolod's Chicken Deli opened in June 2016.

On its first anniversary, Yashano Mall's Facebook page revealed to open its hotel business "Lotus Blu Hotel" which is located inside the mall complex.

== Milestones and developments ==
- November 2015 marks the grand opening with Gerald Anderson as their celebrity guest. It also unveiled their LED Wall which is Legazpi City's first.
- In July 2016, Yashano Mall offered a free jeepney ride within downtown to their mall premises.
- In November 2016 marked their first anniversary with the unveiling of "Lotus Blu Hotel" and the development at its second floor to have its own food court of food retail stores.
