= Lake Aguingay =

- Location within Sorsogon Lake Aguingay (Philippines)
- Location: Luzon Island
- Coordinates: 12.773126°N 124.070018°E
- Type: Seasonal crater lake
- Basin countries: Philippines
- Surface area: 76 hectares (190 acres)
- Shore length^{1}: 3.6 kilometres (2.2 mi)
- Surface elevation: 410 metres (1,350 ft)
- ^{1} Shore length is not a well-defined measure.

Lake Aguingay is a vast plain at the center of Bulusan Volcano National Park located near Bulusan Lake at the Municipality of Bulusan, South central part of the Sorsogon Province, Southern Luzon, Bicol Region, Philippines. It is called The Lake because it is occasionally flooded during wet season and dries up during summer. When it is wet it resembles a big lake located right at the foot of Mt. Bulusan. The area is home to various endemic birds, reptiles and other mammals. It is surrounded by lush vegetation and a tropical rain forest. It is only accessible by foot from Bulusan Lake and from the villages of Kapangihan and San Roque.

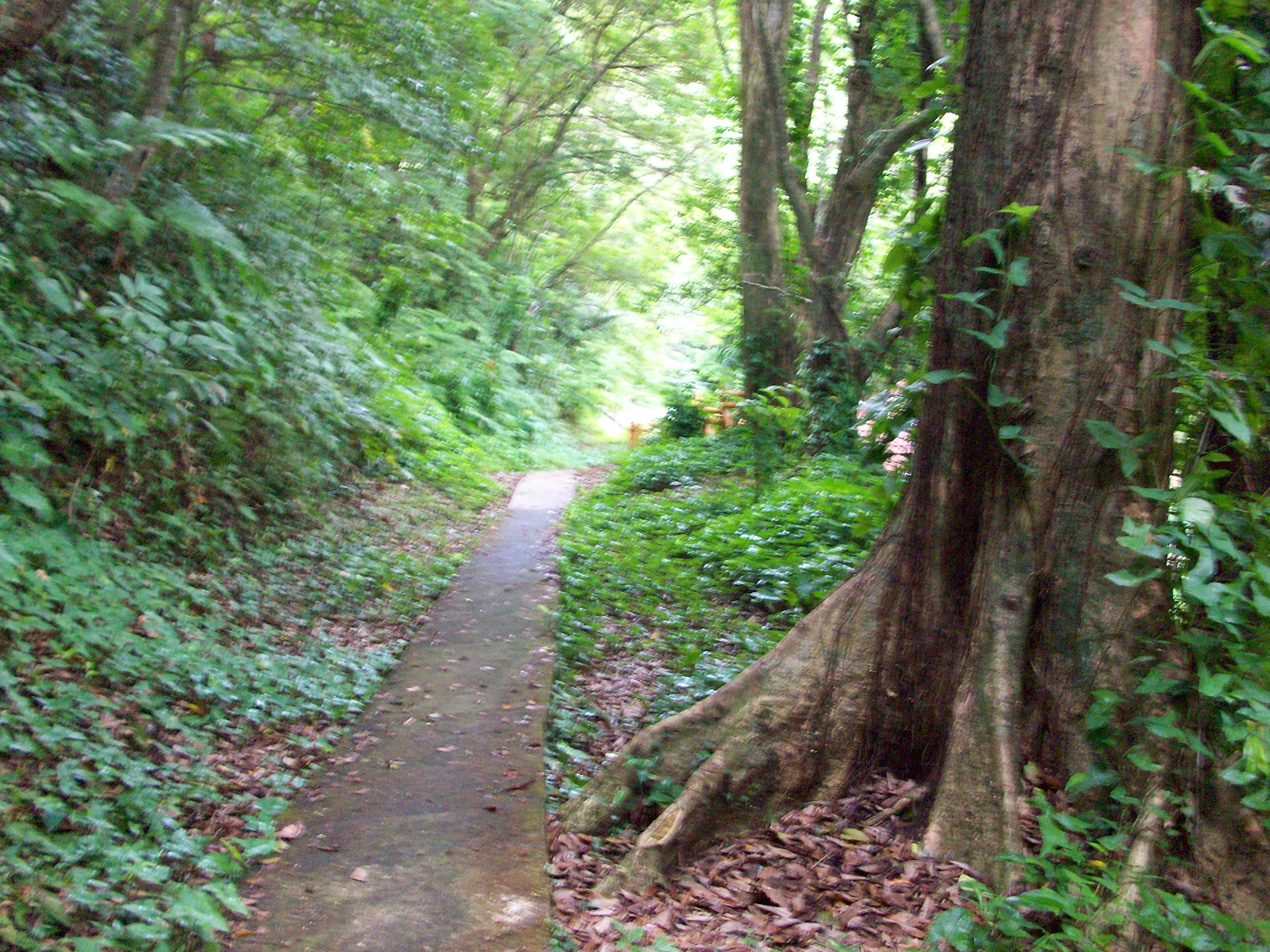
Bulusan Lake loop-way, a possible way to Lake Aguingay.

== Physical characteristics ==
Aguingay Lake is another dormant crater within the Bulusan Volcano areas. During rainy seasons the water is clear and greenish. Some areas are covered with grasses and rocks. It is home to some endemic birds, mammals, insects and reptiles surrounded by tropical rain forest.
