= Bulusan (disambiguation) =

Mount Bulusan is a stratovolcano on the island of Luzon in the Philippines.

Bulusan may also refer to:

- Bulusan (municipality), Sorsogon, Philippines
- Lake Bulusan, Luzon Island, Philippines
