= Bulusan Volcano Natural Park =

Protected area in the Philippines

- IUCN category II (national park)
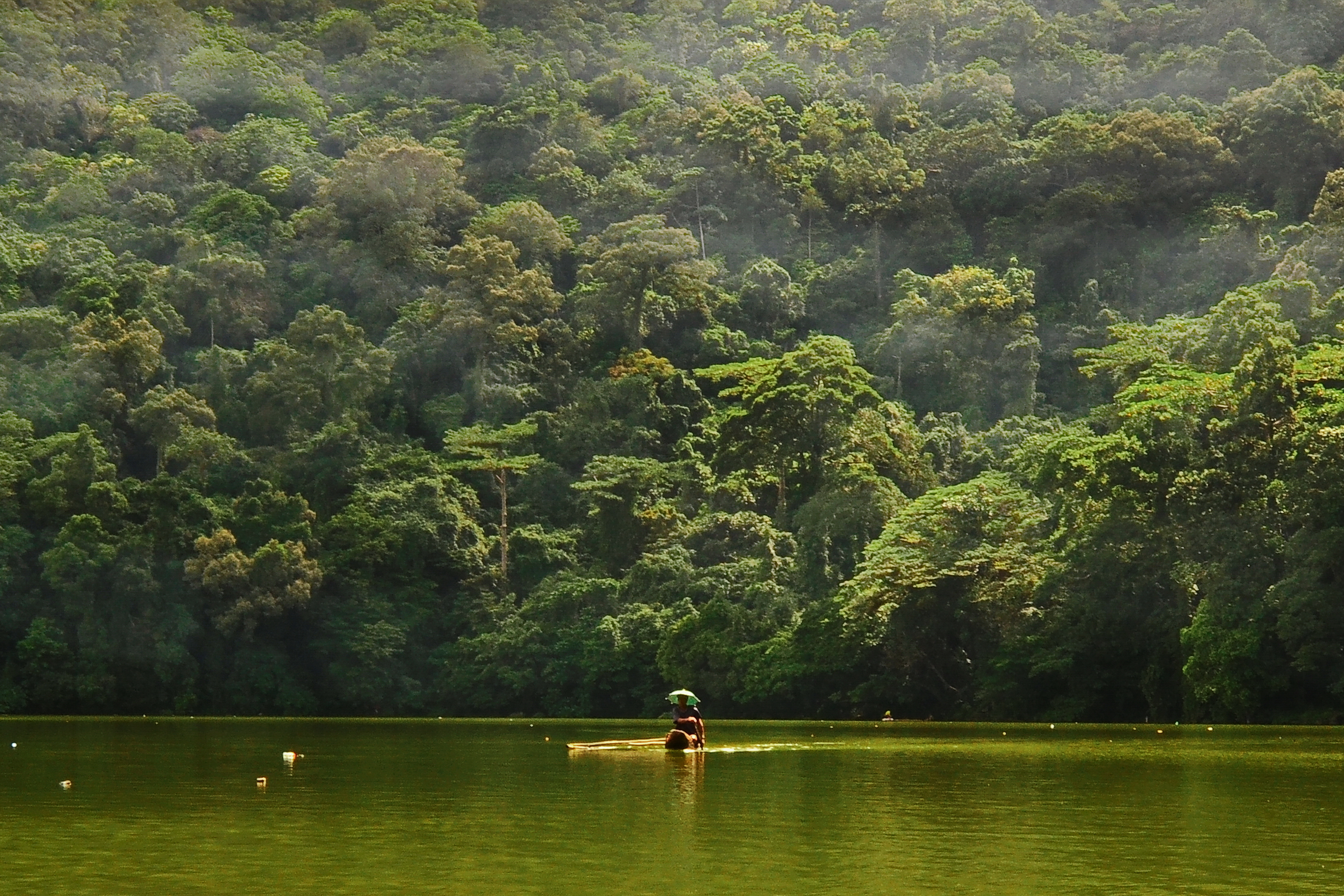

- Location within Sorsogon Location within Philippines
- Location: Sorsogon, Philippines
- Nearest city: Sorsogon City
- Coordinates: 12°46′12″N 124°03′00″E
- Area: 3,672 hectares (9,070 acres)
- Established: June 7, 1935 (National park); November 27, 2000 (Natural park)
- Governing body: Department of Environment and Natural Resources

The Bulusan Volcano Natural Park is a 3,673-hectare (9,080-acre) protected area of rainforest surrounding Mount Bulusan in the Philippines. It was first designated as a National Park by Proclamation no. 811 on June 7, 1935. Under the National Integrated Protected Areas System (NIPAS) of 1992 managed by the Department of the Environment and Natural Resources, the park was reclassified as a Natural Park by Proc. 421 on November 27, 2000. The area features the volcano itself, Bulusan Lake, the two other mountains known as the 'Sharp Peak' and 'Hormahan' and Lake Aguingay. The park is in the south central part of Sorsogon Province, southern Luzon, Bicol Region, Philippines, bounded by five municipalities: Bulusan, Barcelona, Irosin, Juban and Casiguran.

== Physical characteristics and biodiversity ==
There are three main peaks in the park — the active Bulusan Volcano, the highest, which is characterized by numerous deep ravines and caves — Sharp Peak, and the mountain called Hormahan.

The center of the mountain complex forms a vast plain that is occasionally flooded known as Lake Aguingay, which dries up during summer. Another lake in the park is Lake Bulusan. A substantial area of forest remains in the park, including forest around the peak and lowland forest on the slopes. Other habitats include secondary grassland, freshwater lakes and pools, small settlements and rural gardens, abandoned farmland and disturbed ground.

The park supports the needs of the nearby communities through its forest products, watershed, and recreational values. Local communities use the lower slopes as agricultural land. It is the source of water for several communities and for the irrigation of surrounding agricultural land, and it provides natural protection from calamities such as typhoons and flash floods.

== Flora ==
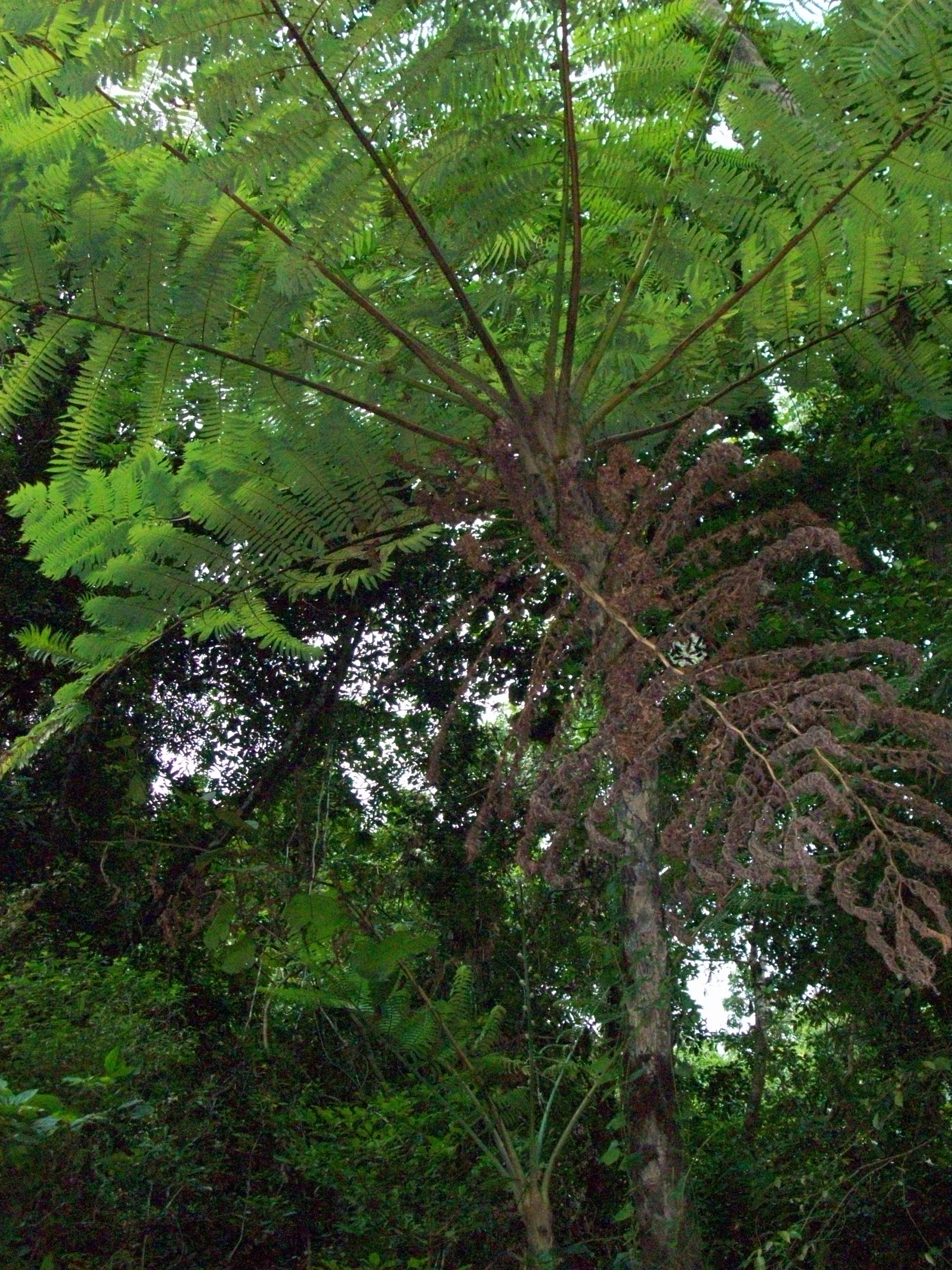
Giant ferns: the most common vegetation found in the park.

The most common vegetation is the giant ferns and tall trees such as the red lauan (Rubroshorea teysmanniana), molave (Vitex parviflora) and many others. Other plant species including ground orchids. Two endemic plant species, Thelypteris bulusanica (a fern) and Heptapleurum caudatifolium, are found in the area.

== Fauna ==
Some animals are in the area, such as the Philippine baboon, Philippine duck, Philippine hawk-eagle, flame-breasted fruit-dove, Philippine eagle-owl, monitor lizards, endemic frogs, snakes, and other reptiles. Philippine brown deer, warty pigs and rare civets were spotted in the area in the late 1980s, although there is no evidences of their existence in the park at present. The park also supports endangered species of frogs, lizards, bats, snakes and other reptiles.

== Management and conservation ==
As the natural habitats declined over the years as a result of extensive kaingin, heavy hunting, and human settling, cooperating municipalities especially Bulusan and Irosin joined in responding to conservation efforts. Plans have been drawn with the support from DENR, local communities, local government units, non-government organizations and concerned citizens for the rehabilitation of affected areas and protection of remaining untouched forests. Eco-tourism has been encouraged to give more jobs to the locals to limit the use of produce found in the park.

Bulusan Volcano Natural Park was declared a national park under Republic Act No. 11038 (Expanded National Integrated Protected Areas System Act of 2018) signed by President Rodrigo Duterte in July 2018.

== Gallery ==
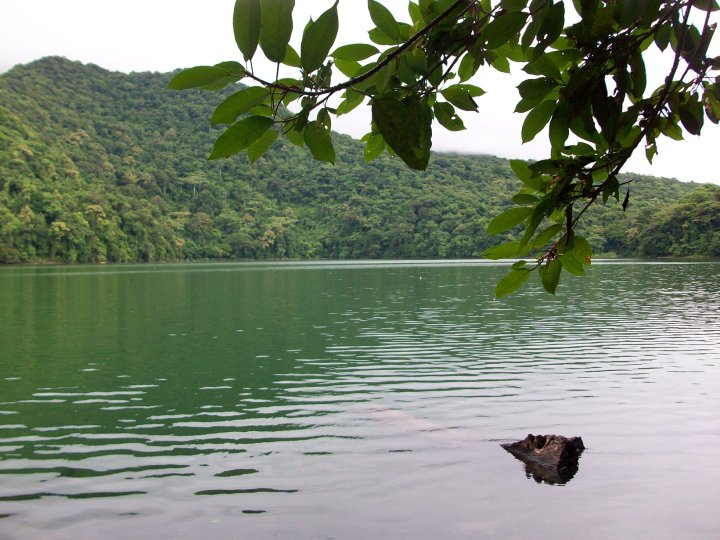
Bulusan Lake at the heart of the park.

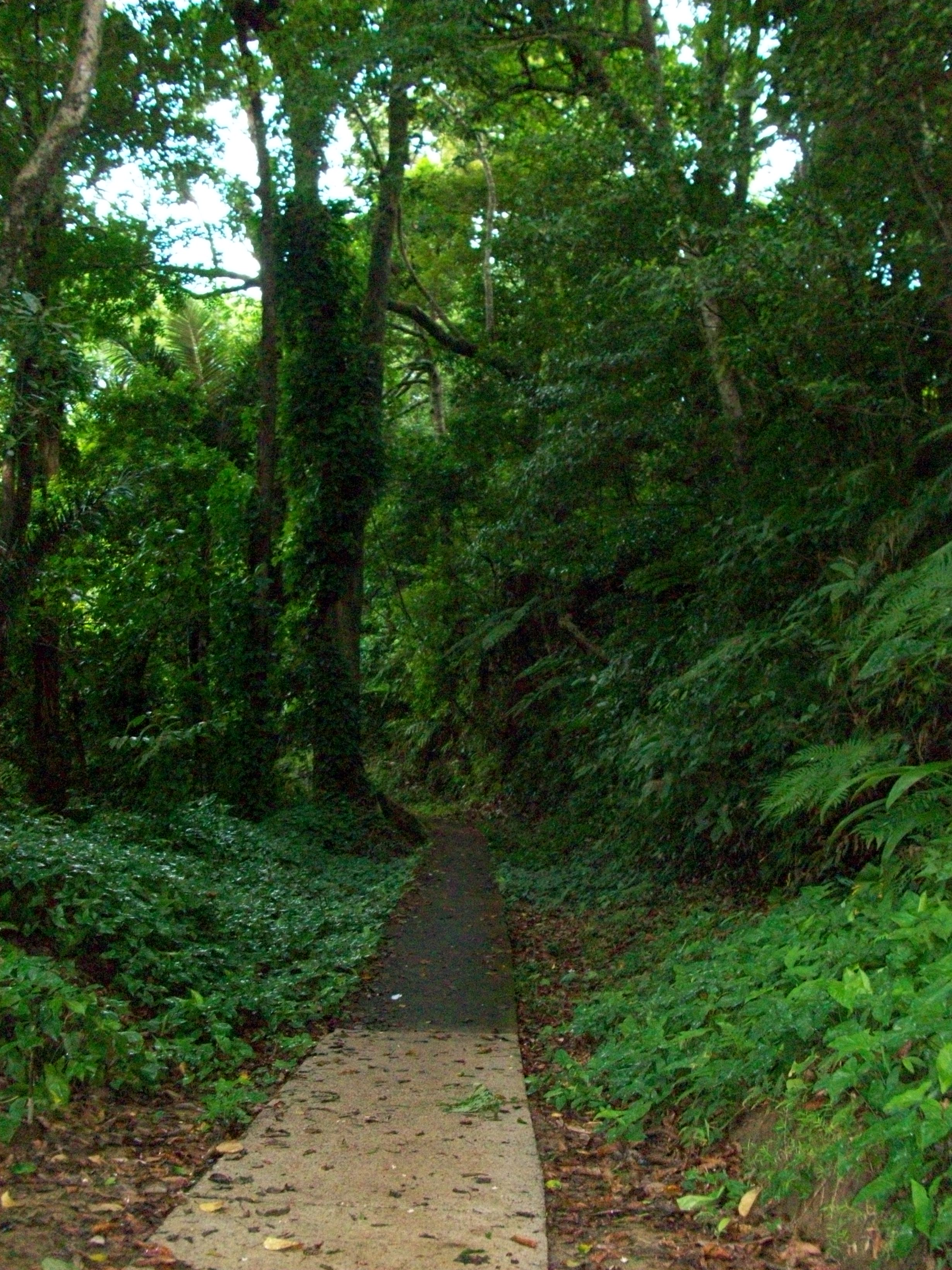
Bulusan Loop way.

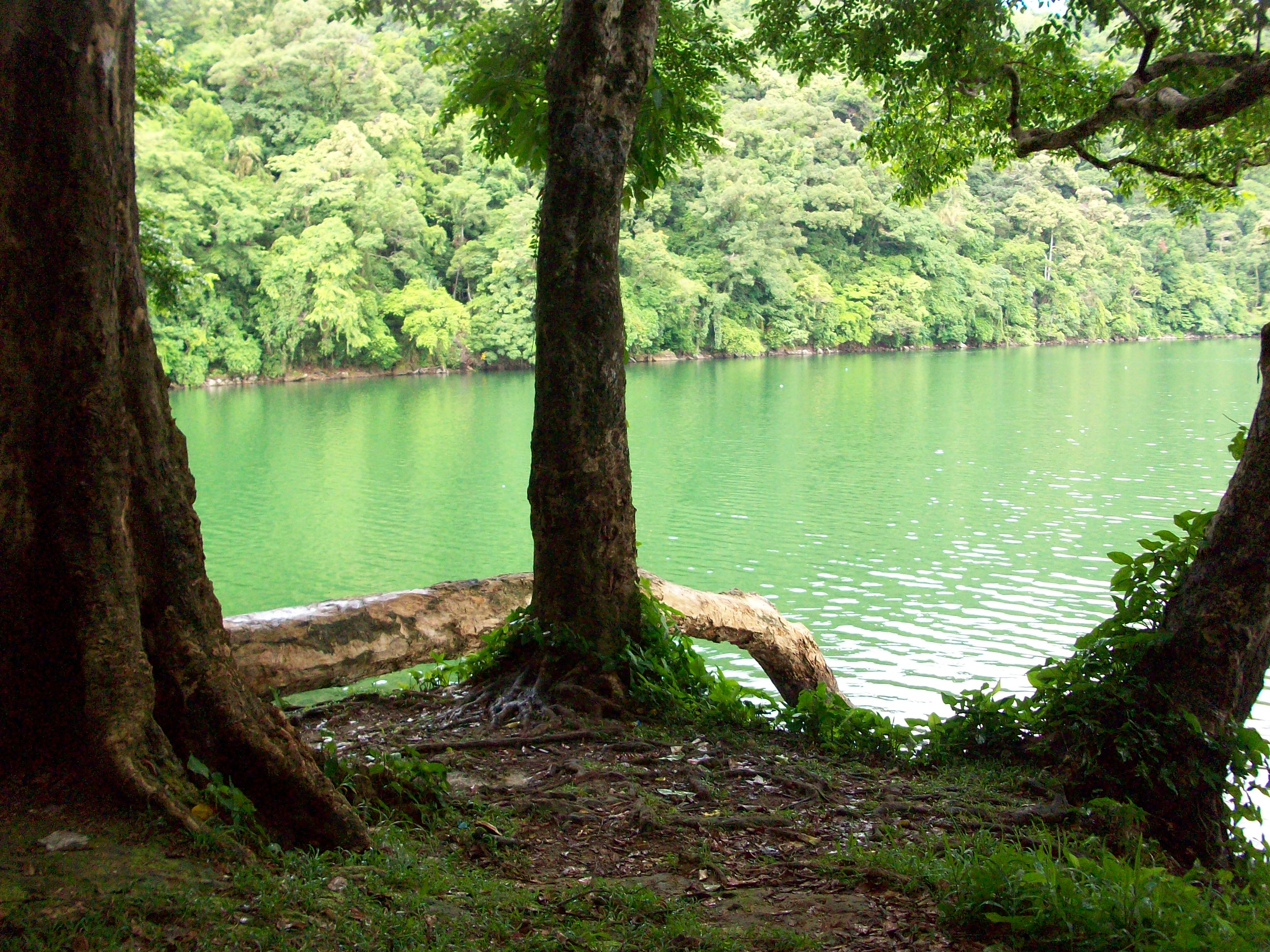
Bulusan Lake east side.

== See also ==
- List of natural parks of the Philippines
- List of protected areas of the Philippines
