= Bicol Volcanic Arc =

Volcanic chain located in the Bicol region

The Bicol Volcanic Arc (also called the Bicol Volcanic Chain) is a 260-kilometer-long volcanic arc located in the central-eastern margin of the Philippine Mobile Belt, specifically the Bicol Region. It is composed of at least 12 volcanic centers, four of which are considered active: Mayon Volcano, Bulusan Volcano, Iriga Volcano, and Isarog Volcano. The Bicol Arc is a product of the westward subduction of the Philippine Sea Plate along the Philippine Trench.

== Formation ==
The Bicol Volcanic Arc is formed by the subduction of the Philippine Sea Plate beneath the Luzon Island Arc. As the Philippine Sea Plate descends beneath Luzon, it melts and releases fluids that rise through the overlying crust. These fluids, which are rich in silica, aluminum, and other minerals, eventually cool and solidify, forming the volcanic arc.

== Characteristics ==
The volcanoes of the Bicol Volcanic Arc are typically stratovolcanoes, which are large, cone-shaped volcanoes that are built up by layers of lava, ash, and other volcanic debris. Stratovolcanoes are often associated with explosive eruptions, which can produce large amounts of ash and other volcanic material. The arc is also home to several calderas, which are large, circular depressions that are formed by the collapse of a volcanic summit.

The Bicol Arc has a significant impact on the Bicol Region. The volcanoes of the arc provide fertile soil for agriculture, and they also attract tourism. However, the volcanoes also pose a hazard to the region. Eruptions can cause damage to property and infrastructure, and they can also displace people from their homes. Additionally, the ash from eruptions can cause respiratory problems.

== Active Volcanoes ==
The Philippines is home to several notable volcanoes, each with its own distinct characteristics and history. Mayon Volcano stands out as one of the most active in the country, boasting a perfect conical shape and a record of over 40 eruptions in the last 400 years. Bulusan Volcano, part of the Bicol Volcanic Arc, is another active stratovolcano that has erupted more than 15 times, known for its explosive activity. In contrast, Iriga Volcano, also in the Bicol Volcanic Arc, is currently dormant, with its last eruption dating back to 1642. Iriga Volcano is a popular hiking destination. Similarly, Isarog Volcano, also dormant and part of the Bicol Volcanic Arc, last erupted in 2,374 BCE ± 87 years or 3,500 BCE ± 125 years (5,500 ya ± 125 years) and is now a favored camping destination. Together, these volcanoes contribute to the geological diversity and natural attractions of the Philippines.
