= Sorsogon =

Province in Bicol, Philippines

- Province
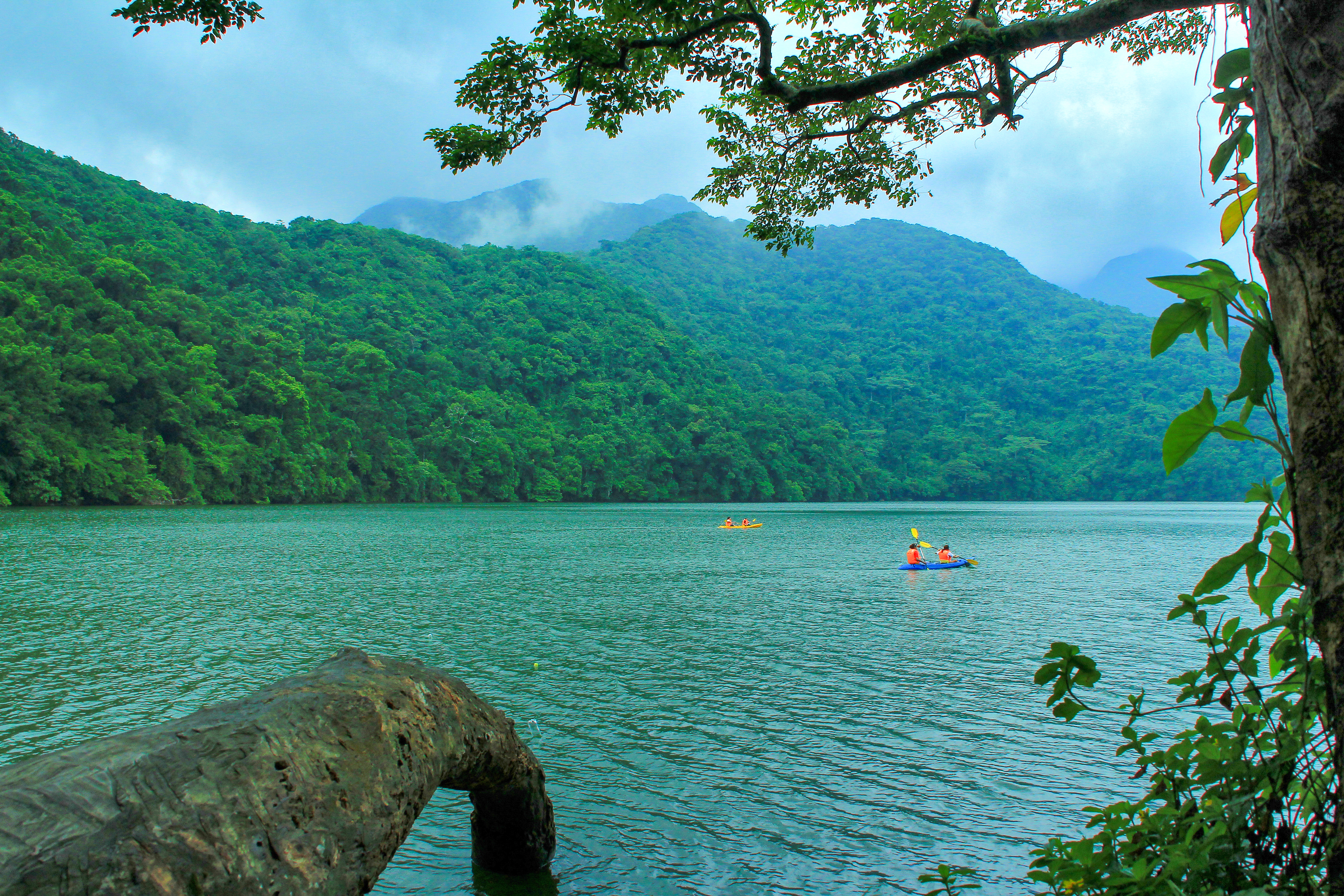
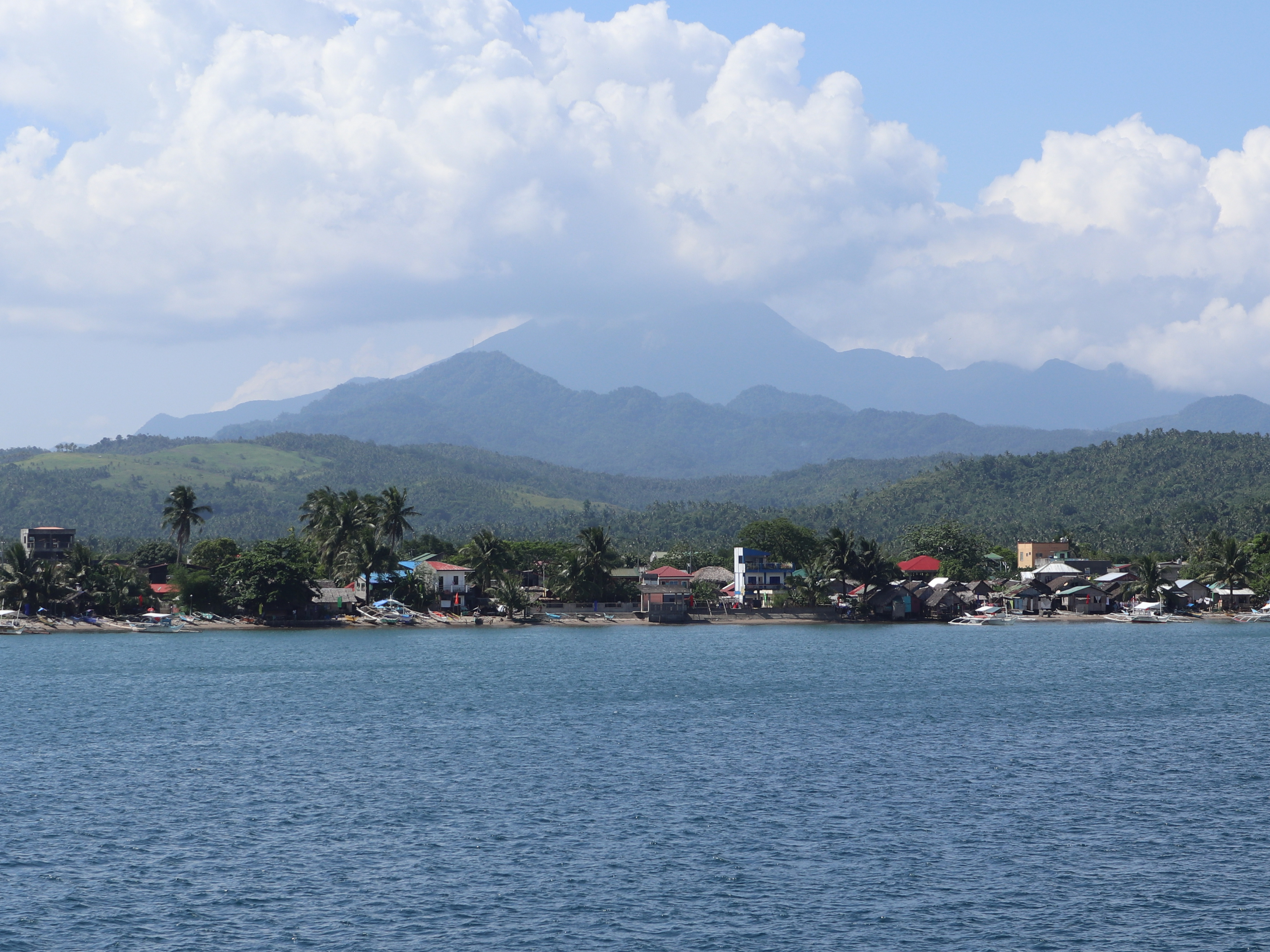
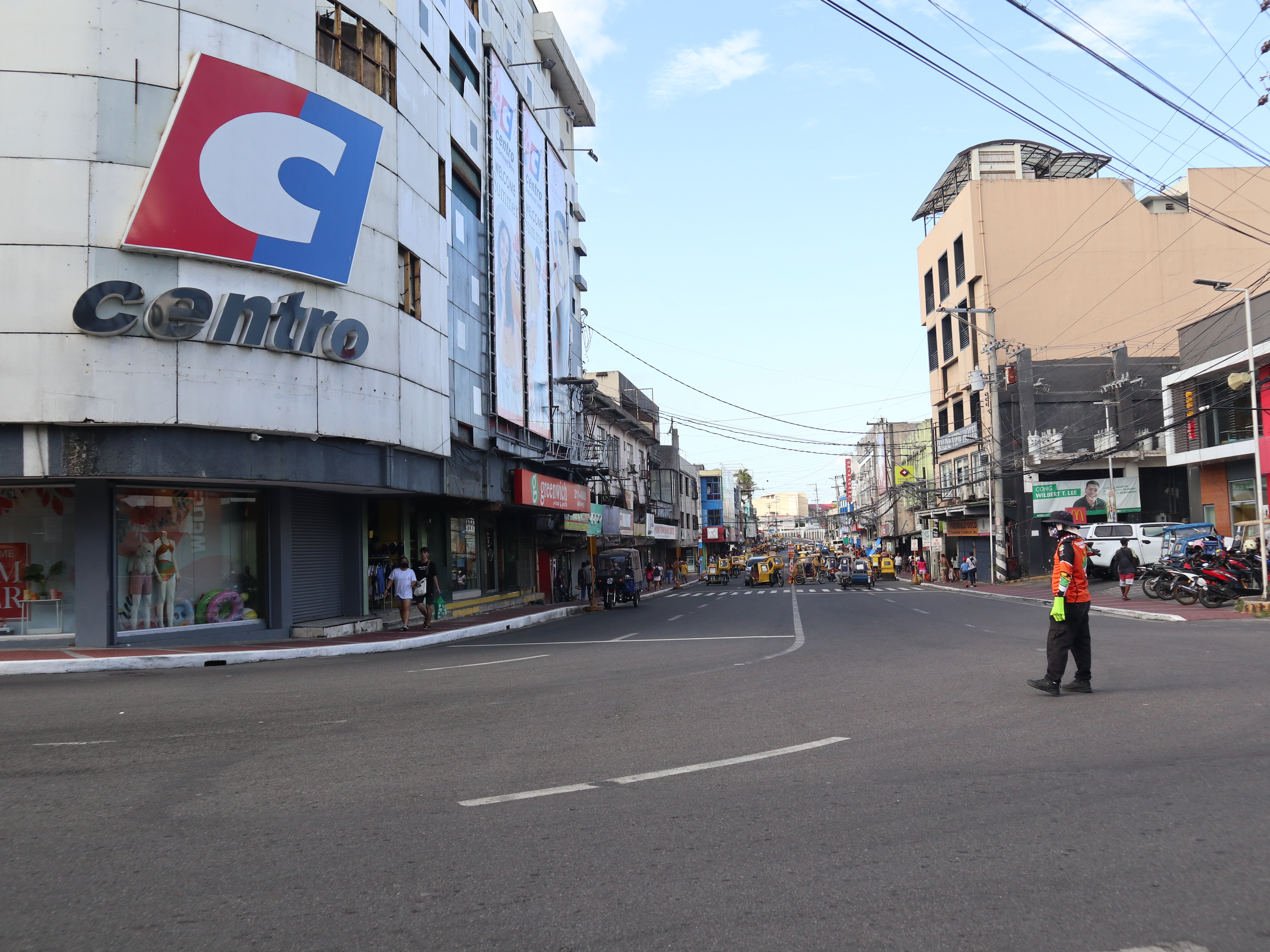
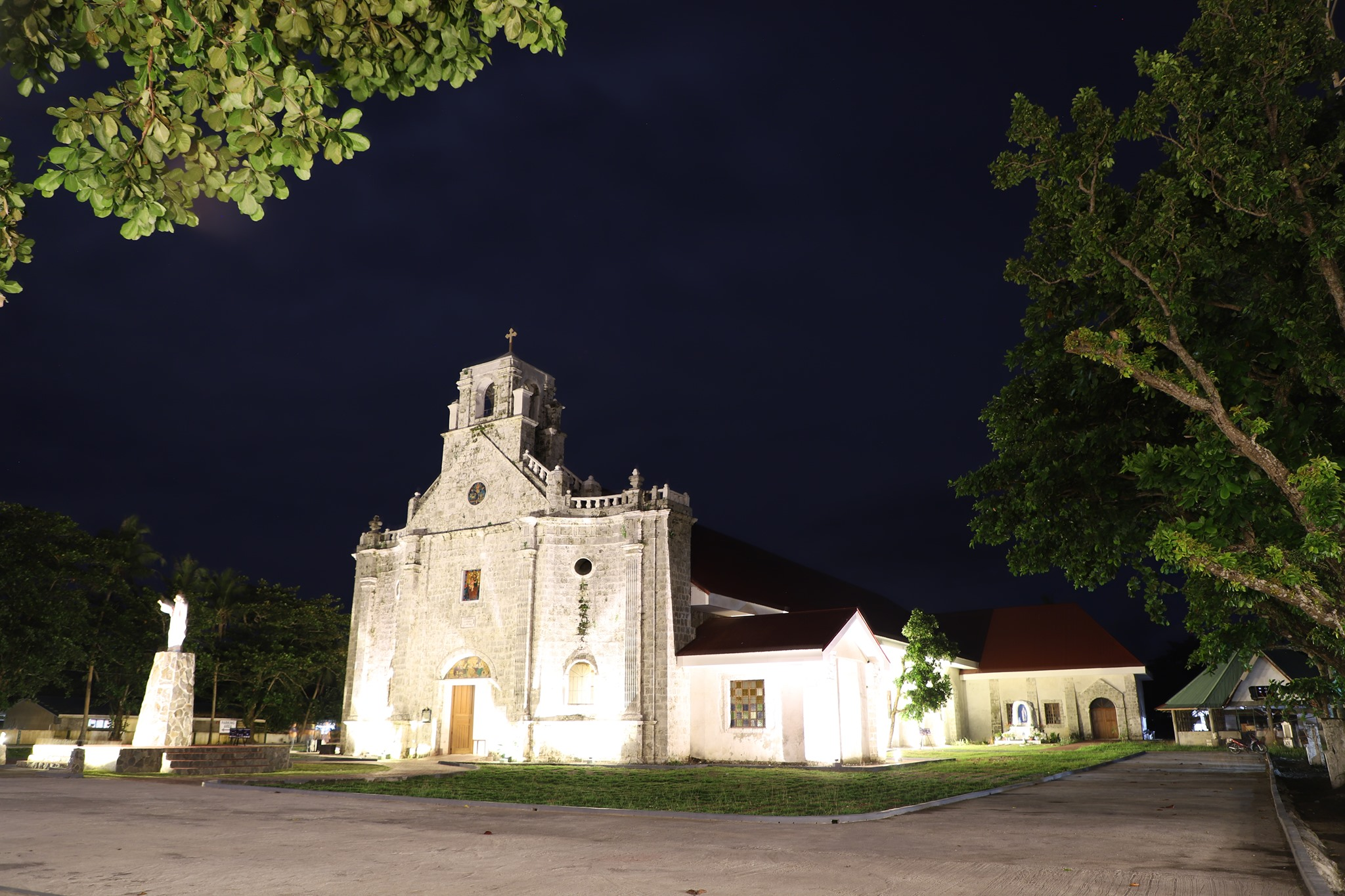
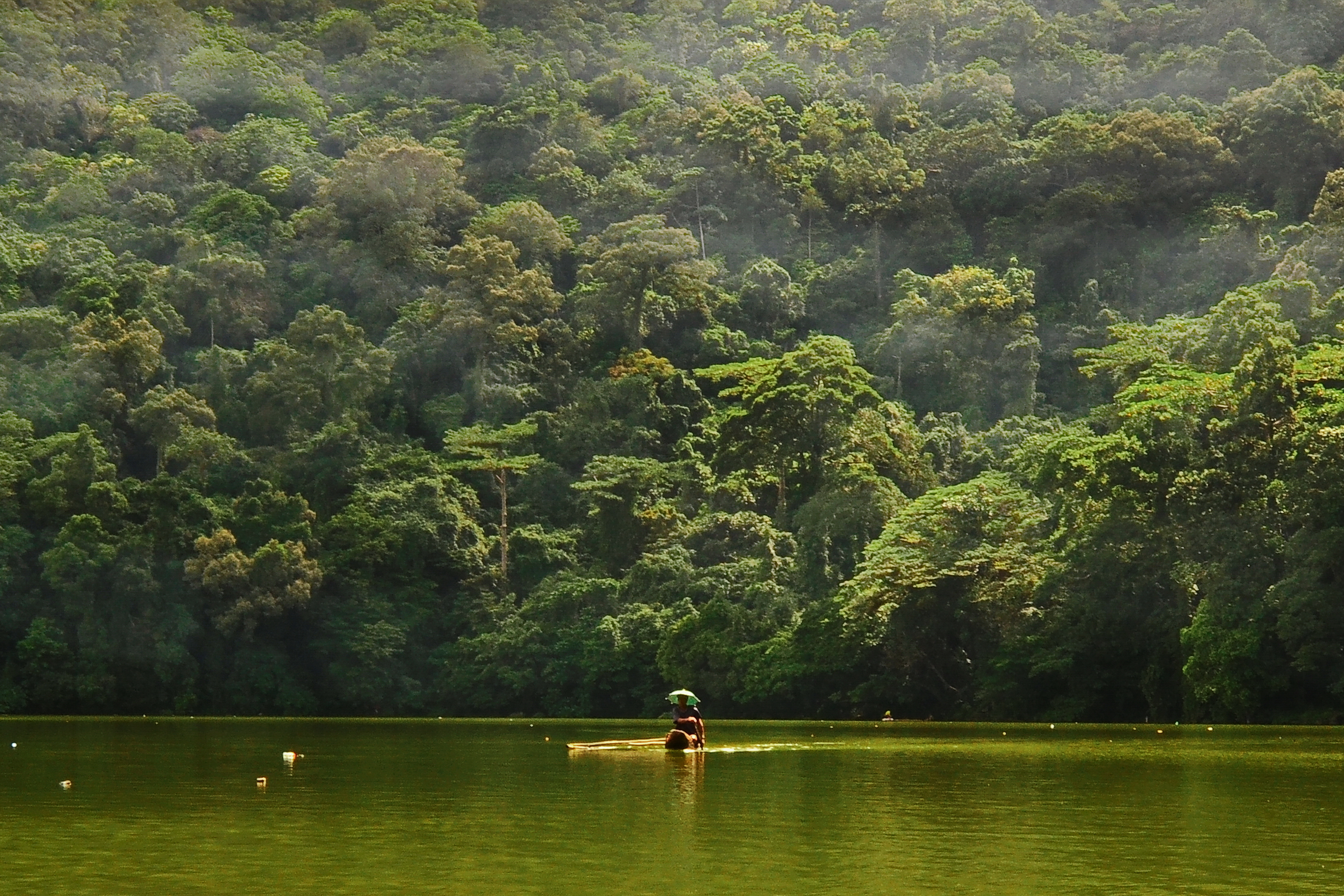
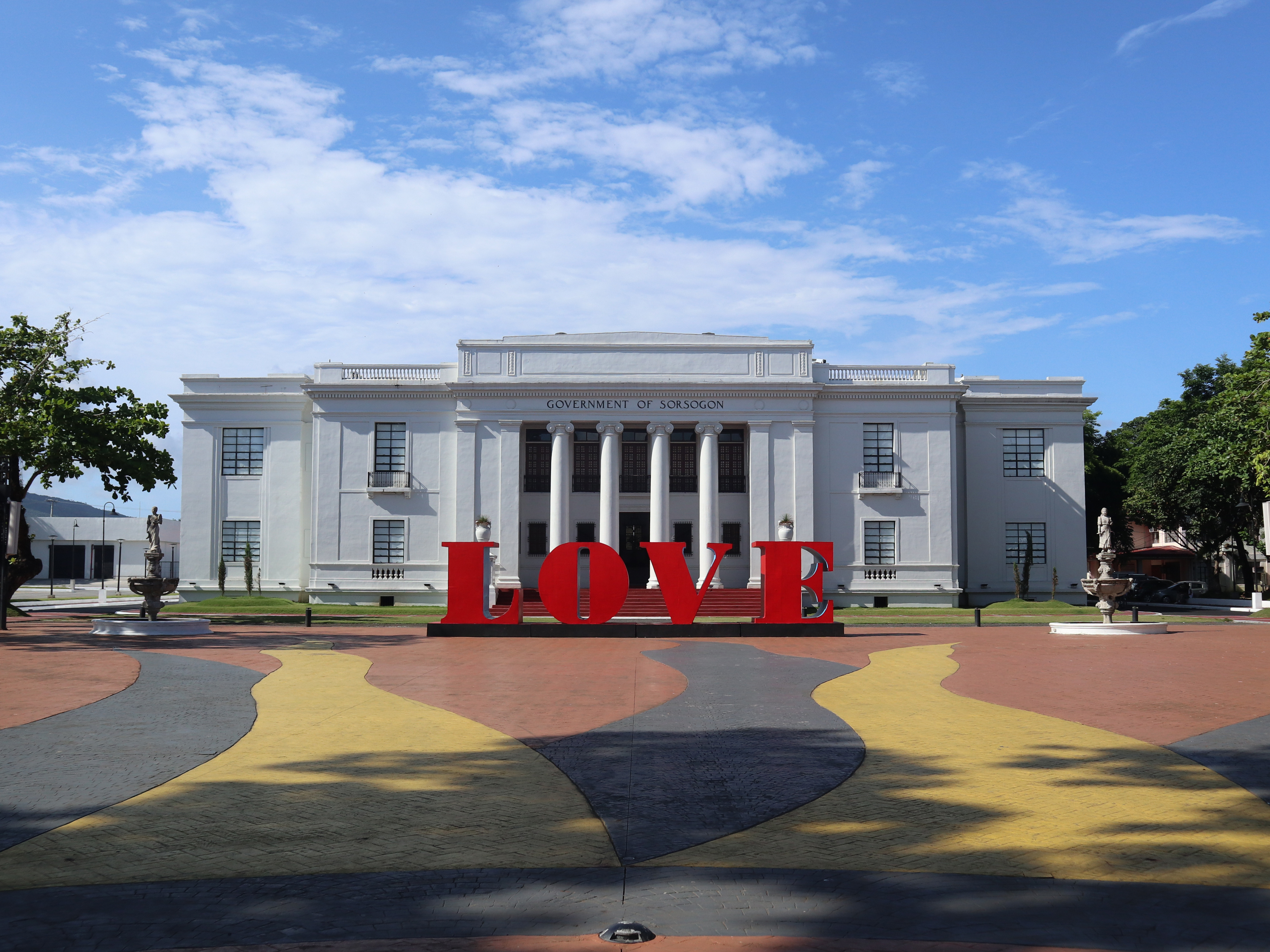
- (from top: left to right) Lake Bulusan, Mount Bulusan, Sorsogon City Downtown, Barcelona church, Bulusan Volcano National Park, Sorsogon Provincial Capitol.

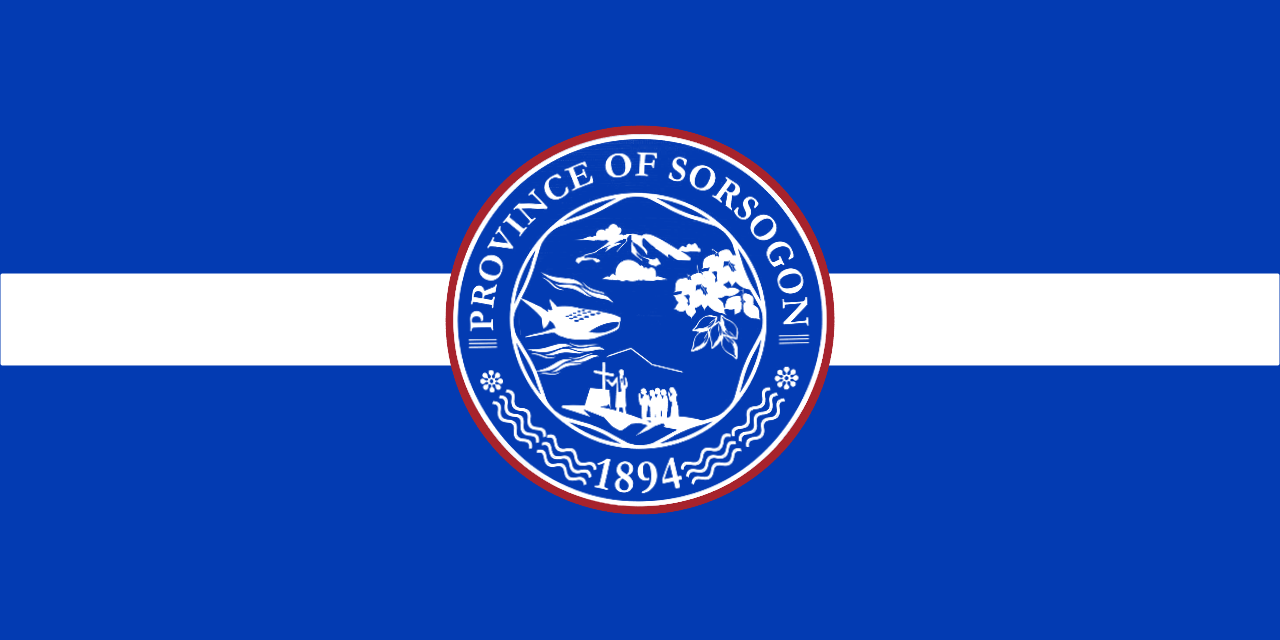
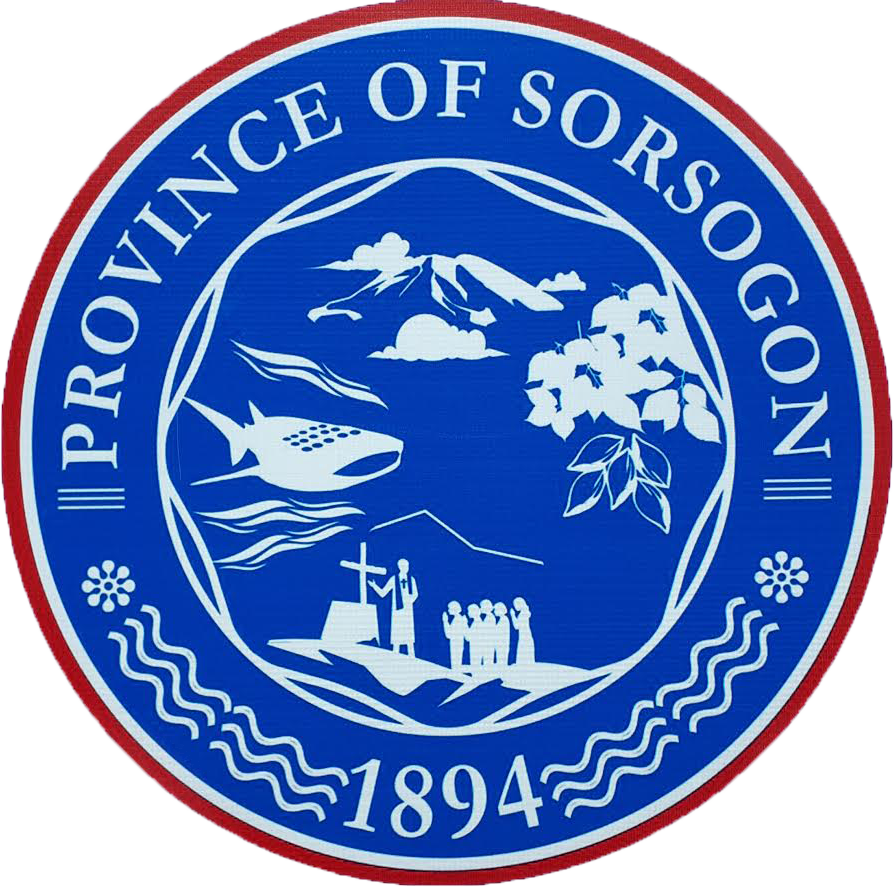
- Flag Seal
- Anthem: Marcha nin Sorsogon (Sorsogon March)
- Location in the Philippines
- Interactive map of Sorsogon
- Coordinates: 12°50′N 123°55′E
- Country: Philippines
- Region: Bicol Region
- Founded: October 17, 1894
- Capital and largest city: Sorsogon City

Government
  - Type: Sangguniang Panlalawigan
  - Governor: Jose Edwin B. Hamor (NPC)
  - Vice Governor: Krunimar Antonio D. Escudero II (NPC)
  - Legislature: Sorsogon Provincial Board
  - Electorate: 553,240 voters (2025)

Area
  - Total: 2,119.01 km^{2} (818.15 sq mi)
  - Rank: 59th out of 82
- Highest elevation (Mount Bulusan): 1,565 m (5,135 ft)

Population (2024 census)
  - Total: 845,066
  - Rank: 36th out of 82
  - Density: 398.802/km^{2} (1,032.89/sq mi)
  - Rank: 15th out of 82
  - Households: 187,462
- Demonyms: Sorsogueño; Sorsoganon

Divisions
  - Independent cities: 0
  - Component cities: 1: Sorsogon City
  - Municipalities: 14: Barcelona; Bulan; Bulusan; Casiguran; Castilla; Donsol; Gubat; Irosin; Juban; Magallanes; Matnog; Pilar; Prieto Diaz; Santa Magdalena
  - Barangays: 541
  - Districts: Legislative districts of Sorsogon

Economy
  - Income class: 1st provincial income class
  - Poverty incidence: 28.4% (2023)
  - Revenue: ₱ 2,783 million (2024)
  - Assets: ₱ 8,244 million (2024)
  - Expenditure: ₱ 2,574 million (2024)
  - Liabilities: ₱ 1,271 million (2024)
- Time zone: UTC+8 (PHT)
- PSGC: 056200000
- IDD : area code: +63 (0)56
- ISO 3166 code: PH-SOR
- Spoken languages: Northern Sorsogon; Bikol; Filipino; English; Waray Sorsogon; Waray-Waray
- Website: www.sorsogon.gov.ph

Sorsogon, officially the Province of Sorsogon (Bikol: Probinsya kan Sorsogon; Waray: Probinsya han Sorsogon; Tagalog: Lalawigan ng Sorsogon), is a province in the Philippines located in the Bicol Region. It is the southernmost province in the island of Luzon and is subdivided into fourteen municipalities (towns) and one city. Its capital (and largest city) is Sorsogon City (formerly the towns of Sorsogon and Bacon) and borders the province of Albay to the north.

Sorsogon is at the tip of the Bicol Peninsula and faces the island of Samar to the southeast across the San Bernardino Strait and Ticao Island to the southwest. Sorsoganons is how the people of Sorsogon call themselves.

== History ==
=== Spanish colonial era ===
In 1570, two Augustinian friars, Alonzon Jiménez and Juan Orta, accompanied by a certain captain, Enrique de Guzmán, reached Hibalong, a small fishing village near the mouth of Ginangra River, and planted the cross and erected the first chapel in Luzon. It was from this village that Ibalong, referring to the whole region, came to be. Moving inland with a northwesterly direction they passed by the territory now known as Pilar, before they reached Camalig, Albay. The establishment of the Abucay-Catamlangan Mission later was ample proof of this. The early towns established here were: Gibalon in 1570 (now sitio of Magallanes); Casiguran – 1600; Bulusan – 1631; Pilar – 1635; Donsol – 1668; Bacon - 1754; Gubat - 1764; Juban and Matnog – 1800; Bulan – 1801; Castilla – 1827; Magallanes – 1860; Barcelona – 1866 and Irosin – 1880. The province was eventually separated from Albay on October 17, 1894, and adopted the name Sorsogon. The town of Sorsogon was also selected as its capital.

The 1818 census showed 1,785 native families paying tribute and they were coexisting with 149 Spanish-Filipino families in the area.

=== American colonial era ===
At the 1935 Philippine Constitutional Convention, Sorsogon had its own delegates. They were Adolfo Grafilo, Francisco Arellano, José S. Reyes, and Mario Gaurino.

=== Martial law era ===
The Philippines' gradual postwar recovery took a turn for the worse in the late 1960s and early 1970s, with the 1969 Philippine balance of payments crisis being one of the early landmark events. Economic analysts generally attribute this to the ramp-up on loan-funded government spending to promote Ferdinand Marcos’ 1969 reelection campaign, The next two and a half years were fraught with social conflicts as various sectors went to the streets to express their dissastisfaction with policies that fostered widespread poverty. In 1972, one year before the expected end of his last constitutionally allowed term as president in 1973, Ferdinand Marcos placed the Philippines under Martial Law. This allowed Marcos to remain in power for fourteen more years, during which Sorsogon went through many social and economic ups and downs. Labor unions and protest actions were banned, media outlets were shuttered, the legislature was shuttered, and freedom of expression was generally suppressed. Those who expressed opinions which criticized the government or its policies were accused of being communists and arrested without warrant.

During this time, many citizens of Sorsogon joined the effort to resist the erosion of democracy, and many of them became political detainees, or were tortured and killed by the dictatorship's forces. Among the more prominent of them were local figures Ma. Antonia Teresa “Nanette” Vytiaco, Antonio "Tony" Ariado, Ceasar Gavanzo Jr., and Manuel Dorotan, as well as figures like Liliosa Hilao and Juan Escandor, who were killed in Manila. Vytiaco, Ariado, Gavanzo, Dorotan, Hilao, and Escandor have all since been honored by having their names inscribed on the Wall of Remembrance at the Philippines' Bantayog ng mga Bayani, which honors the martyrs and heroes who fought against the authoritarian regime.

=== Contemporary ===
In 2000, Sorsogon City was created through the merging of the municipalities of Bacon and Sorsogon.

== Geography ==
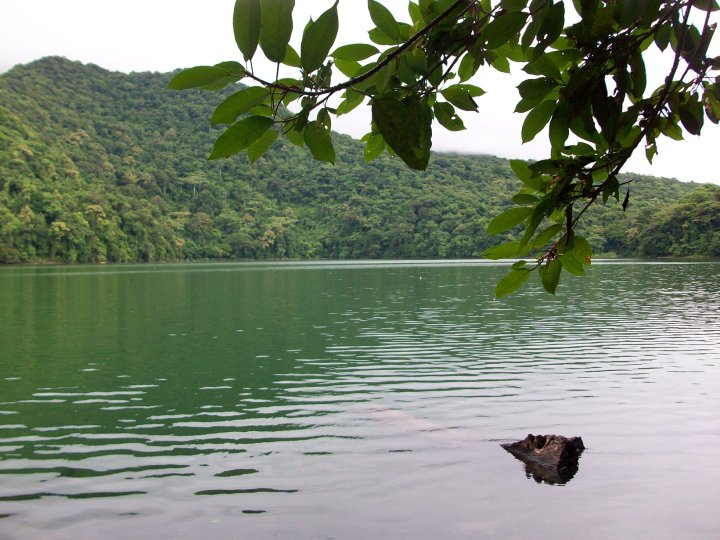
Bulusan Lake on the slope of Bulusan Volcano National Park

Sorsogon covers a total area of 2,119.01 square kilometres (818.15 sq mi) occupying the southeastern tip of the Bicol Peninsula in Luzon. The province is bordered on the north by Albay, east by the Philippine Sea, south by the San Bernardino Strait, and west and northwest by the Ticao and Burias Passes. The Sorsogon Bay lies within the central portion of the province.

The province has an irregular topography. Except for landlocked Irosin, all the towns lie along the coast. They are all connected by concrete and asphalt roads. Mountain's sprawl over the northeast, southeast and west portions. Mount Bulusan, the tallest peak, rises 1,560 metres (5,120 ft) above sea level.

Except for its overland link with the province of Albay to the north, it is completely surrounded by water. Sorsogon is the gateway of Luzon to the Visayas through its Roll-on/Roll-off ferry terminal facilities located in the municipalities of Matnog, Pilar and Bulan.

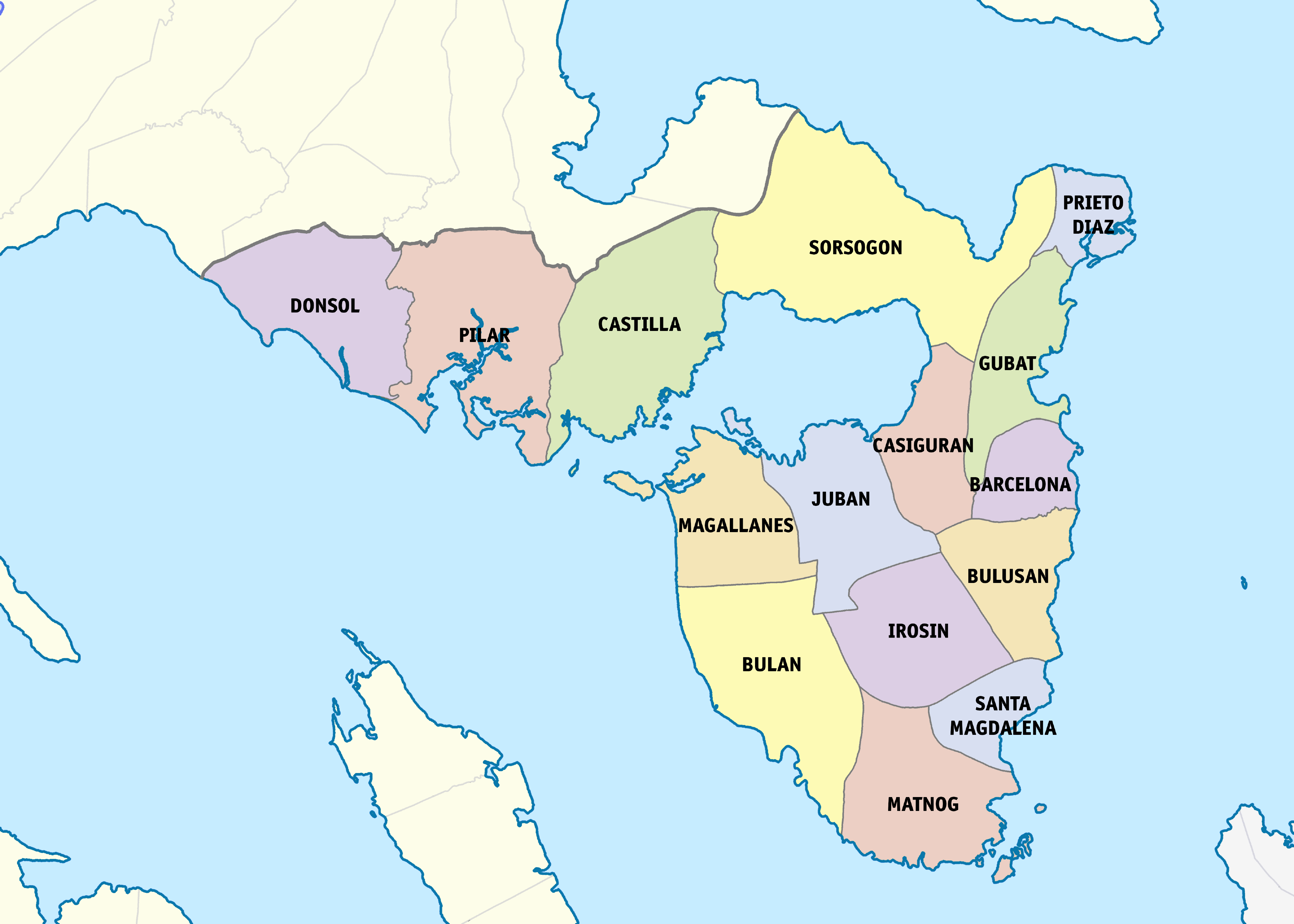
Political map of Sorsogon

=== Administrative divisions ===
Sorsogon comprises 14 municipalities and 1 city.

- † Provincial capital and component city
- Municipality

| City or municipality | | District | Population | | | ±% p.a. | Area | | Density | | Barangay | Coordinates^{[A]} |
| | | | (2020) | | (2015) | | km^{2} | sq mi | /km^{2} | /sq mi | | |
|---|---|---|---|---|---|---|---|---|---|---|---|---|
| Barcelona | | 2nd | 2.5% | 20,987 | 20,990 | 0.00% | 61.18 | 23.62 | 340 | 880 | 25 | 12°51′59″N 124°08′42″E |
| Bulan | | 2nd | 12.7% | 105,190 | 100,076 | +0.95% | 196.96 | 76.05 | 530 | 1,400 | 63 | 12°40′04″N 123°52′39″E |
| Bulusan | | 2nd | 2.9% | 23,932 | 22,884 | +0.86% | 96.30 | 37.18 | 250 | 650 | 24 | 12°45′06″N 124°08′14″E |
| Casiguran | | 1st | 4.3% | 35,602 | 32,842 | +1.55% | 87.13 | 33.64 | 410 | 1,100 | 25 | 12°52′24″N 124°00′33″E |
| Castilla | | 1st | 7.3% | 60,635 | 57,827 | +0.91% | 186.20 | 71.89 | 330 | 850 | 34 | 12°57′00″N 123°52′44″E |
| Donsol | | 1st | 6.1% | 50,281 | 49,711 | +0.22% | 156.20 | 60.31 | 320 | 830 | 51 | 12°54′28″N 123°35′55″E |
| Gubat | | 2nd | 7.3% | 60,294 | 59,534 | +0.24% | 134.51 | 51.93 | 450 | 1,200 | 42 | 12°55′04″N 124°07′27″E |
| Irosin | | 2nd | 7.2% | 59,267 | 56,662 | +0.86% | 149.87 | 57.87 | 400 | 1,000 | 28 | 12°42′08″N 124°02′03″E |
| Juban | | 1st | 4.3% | 35,297 | 32,320 | +1.69% | 121.49 | 46.91 | 290 | 750 | 25 | 12°50′51″N 123°59′22″E |
| Magallanes | | 1st | 4.5% | 37,411 | 37,038 | +0.19% | 150.09 | 57.95 | 250 | 650 | 34 | 12°49′38″N 123°50′14″E |
| Matnog | | 2nd | 5.1% | 41,989 | 41,101 | +0.41% | 162.40 | 62.70 | 260 | 670 | 40 | 12°35′10″N 124°05′08″E |
| Pilar | | 1st | 9.1% | 75,793 | 74,564 | +0.31% | 248.00 | 95.75 | 310 | 800 | 49 | 12°55′23″N 123°40′27″E |
| Prieto Diaz | | 2nd | 2.7% | 22,644 | 22,442 | +0.17% | 49.07 | 18.95 | 460 | 1,200 | 23 | 13°02′26″N 124°11′36″E |
| Santa Magdalena | | 2nd | 2.1% | 17,096 | 16,848 | +0.28% | 43.50 | 16.80 | 390 | 1,000 | 14 | 12°38′47″N 124°06′28″E |
| Sorsogon City | † | 1st | 22.0% | 182,237 | 168,110 | +1.55% | 276.11 | 106.61 | 660 | 1,700 | 64 | 12°58′15″N 124°00′19″E |
| Total | | | | 828,655 | 792,949 | +0.84% | 2,119.01 | 818.15 | 390 | 1,000 | 541 | (see GeoGroup box) |
1. Coordinates mark the city/town center, and are sortable by latitude.

=== Climate ===
Sorsogon belongs to Type 2 climate based on the Climate Map of the Philippines by the Philippine Atmospheric, Geophysical and Astronomical Services Administration (PAGASA). Being a Type 2, Sorsogon has No dry season with a pronounced rainfall from November to January.

Climate data for Sorsogon
| Month | Jan | Feb | Mar | Apr | May | Jun | Jul | Aug | Sep | Oct | Nov | Dec | Year |
|---|---|---|---|---|---|---|---|---|---|---|---|---|---|
| Mean daily maximum °C (°F) | 31 (88) | 31 (88) | 32 (90) | 34 (93) | 34 (93) | 33 (91) | 33 (91) | 33 (91) | 33 (91) | 33 (91) | 32 (90) | 31 (88) | 34 (93) |
| Mean daily minimum °C (°F) | 23 (73) | 23 (73) | 24 (75) | 25 (77) | 26 (79) | 25 (77) | 25 (77) | 25 (77) | 25 (77) | 25 (77) | 25 (77) | 24 (75) | 24 (75) |
| Average precipitation mm (inches) | 150.8 (5.94) | 101.8 (4.01) | 82.3 (3.24) | 44.9 (1.77) | 132.5 (5.22) | 146 (5.7) | 196.9 (7.75) | 181.6 (7.15) | 168.5 (6.63) | 199.2 (7.84) | 191.2 (7.53) | 233.7 (9.20) | 152.45 (6.00) |
| Average rainy days | 18 | 14 | 12 | 7 | 10 | 14 | 17 | 18 | 18 | 20 | 20 | 22 | 190 |
Source: World Weather Online (modeled/calculated data, not measured locally) "worldweatheronline.com". World Weather Online. 2015.

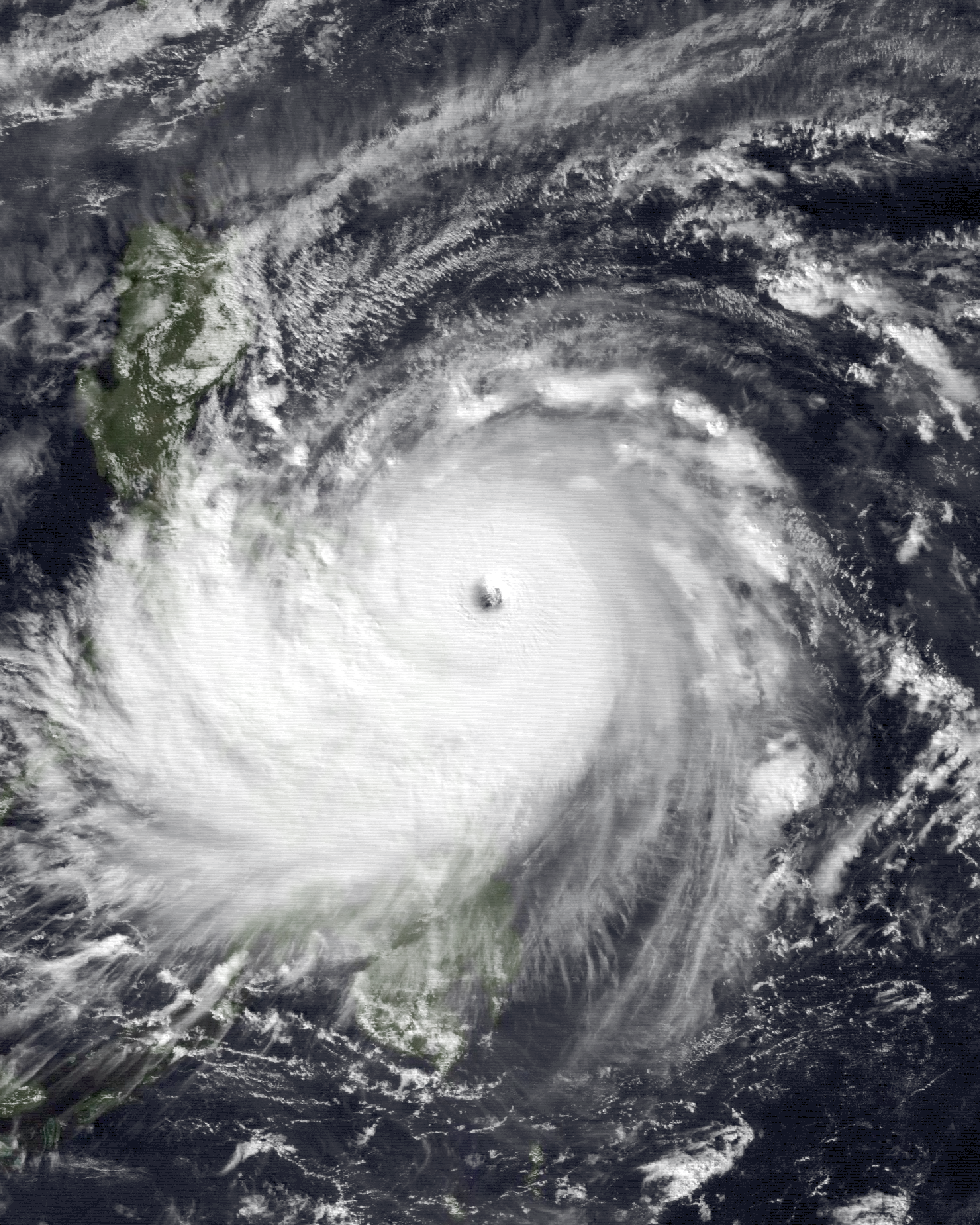
Typhoon Nina (known as Sisang) the strongest typhoon that hit the province killing at least 200 people

The province of Sorsogon normally gets 5 to 10 typhoons every year.

The most notable typhoon is in 1987, when Sorsogon was devastated by Super Typhoon Nina named Sisang. It was a major disaster in the Province of Sorsogon. Damages in properties cost millions of pesos and killing 200 people. It is said that Sisang is the strongest typhoon that hit the province, especially its capital, Sorsogon City. According to PAGASA, Typhoon Nina ravaged with a wind of 180 kilometres per hour (50 m/s) and a gustiness of 200 km/h (56 m/s). Thousands of houses plus business establishments were destroyed by the said natural calamity. Typhoon Sisang hit the Sorsogon soil at around 7:00 pm and it last until dawn of the next day. It also caused massive storm surges particularly around the Sorsogon Bay area which contributed to the many fatalities during the battering of the typhoon.

Typhoon Xangsane (Milenyo) also battered the province in September 2006 with torrential rains and strong winds. It caused massive flooding and caused infrastructure and agricultural damages. Damages to the entire province was initially placed at ₱2.23 billion, of which ₱1.27 billion was accounted for by damaged houses. Agriculture suffered damage worth ₱234.21 million; school facilities, ₱51 million and infrastructure, ₱208 million.

== Demographics ==
=== Population ===
The population of Sorsogon in the 2024 census was 845,066 people, with a density of 400 inhabitants per square kilometre or 1,000 inhabitants per square mile.

The top 5 towns with the greatest number of populations is Sorsogon City (168,110), Bulan (100,076), Pilar (74,564), Gubat (59,534), and Castilla (57,827). The least populated municipality since the 2000 census is Santa Magdalena.

Of the 704,024-household population in 2007, males accounted for 51.1% and while females comprised 48.9%.

The voting-age population of the province was 369,204 in 2007, equivalent to 52.1 percent of the household population.

Population census of Sorsogon

| Year | Pop. | ±% p.a. |
|---|---|---|
| 1903 | 161,921 | — |
| 1918 | 245,956 | +2.83% |
| 1939 | 247,653 | +0.03% |
| 1948 | 291,138 | +1.81% |
| 1960 | 347,771 | +1.49% |
| 1970 | 427,047 | +2.07% |

| Year | Pop. | ±% p.a. |
|---|---|---|
| 1975 | 446,502 | +0.90% |
| 1980 | 500,685 | +2.32% |
| 1990 | 522,960 | +0.44% |
| 1995 | 591,927 | +2.35% |
| 2000 | 650,535 | +2.04% |
| 2007 | 709,673 | +1.21% |

| Year | Pop. | ±% p.a. |
|---|---|---|
| 2010 | 740,743 | +1.57% |
| 2015 | 792,949 | +1.31% |
| 2020 | 828,655 | +0.93% |
| 2024 | 845,066 | +0.47% |

Figures before 1920 exclude areas that became part of Masbate.
Source: Philippine Statistics Authority

=== Languages ===
The Bicolano language is predominantly used in Sorsogon as the language used by its people. Despite this, Bicolano itself, as used in the province, has many peculiarities. What is known as "Bikol Naga" is generally used in written communications and generally understood there as a spoken language. However, the people who live in the southernmost parts of Sorsogon like Gubat speak the Waray language. In either case, English and Filipino are the official languages used in education and government communication.

The Bikol languages are peculiar in some localities. For example, people in Bacon, Prieto Diaz and Magallanes speak the Albay Bikol variant. In Sorsogon City, Casiguran and Juban, Bicolano is different for some terms being used there, which have similarity to the Hiligaynon language (the language spoken in Western Visayas and southwestern Masbate) and a variant of Bisakol.

In Barcelona, Gubat, Bulusan, Matnog, Irosin and Santa Magdalena, a dialect is spoken in which terms and tones are similar to the Waray language of Eastern Visayas (particularly in Northern Samar) called Waray Sorsogon language. The people of Pilar and Donsol speak a dialect which is similar, but not exactly, to the "Miraya Bicol" or the dialect spoken by the nearby towns of Camalig and Daraga in Albay province. The Castilla dialect, although distinct, has a similarity to that which is spoken in Daraga.

==== Sorsogon Ayta language ====
In 2010, UNESCO released its 3rd world volume of Endangered Languages in the World, where 3 critically endangered languages were in the Philippines. One of these languages in the Southern Ayta (Sorsogon Ayta) language which has an estimated speaker of 150 people in the year 2000. The language was classified as Critically Endangered, meaning the youngest speakers are grandparents and older, and they speak the language partially and infrequently and hardly pass the language to their children and grandchildren anymore. If the remaining 150 people do not pass their native language to the next generation of Sorsogon Ayta people, their indigenous language will be extinct within a period of 1 to 2 decades.

The Sorsogon Ayta people live only on the municipality of Prieto Diaz, Sorsogon. They are one of the original Negrito settlers in the entire Philippines. They belong to the Aeta people classification but have distinct language and belief systems unique to their own culture and heritage.

=== Religion ===
Sorsogon is predominantly a Catholic province. Spanish conquistadores gave Sorsogon its first encounter with Christianity. This was in the year 1569 when Fray Alonzo Jimenez, OSA, chaplain of the expedition under Luis Enriquez de Guzman celebrated the first Mass upon landing on the coast of sitio Gibal-ong (or Gibalon), barangay Siuton, in the town of Magallanes. Christianity, however, was formally established in Sorsogon with the planting of the Cross on the shores of Casiguran town in 1600 by the Franciscan Friars. This was a prelude to the erection of the first church building dedicated to the Holy Rosary, still revered at present as the Patroness of Casiguran. From there, the Franciscan missionaries devotedly spread the faith to the other towns in Bacon (1617), Bulusan (1630) and Donsol (1668). The other twelve towns followed suit in the course of time. In the original geographic division, the province of Sorsogon formed part of Albay province. It seceded as a separate province on October 17, 1984. Catholicism is followed by 93% of the population of Sorsogon.

The Diocese of Sorsogon was originally part of the Archdiocese of Nueva Caceres. When it was made a separate diocese on June 29, 1951, it included the territory of Masbate. When the Diocese of Nueva Caceres was elevated into an archdiocese in the same year, Legazpi and Sorsogon were made suffragan dioceses of Nueva Caceres. On March 23, 1968, Masbate was made into a separate diocese. At present the Diocese of Sorsogon covers simply the civil province of Sorsogon and the City of Sorsogon with the Saints Peter and Paul Cathedral in Sorsogon City as its seat.

The Iglesia Ni Cristo (Church Of Christ) has the minority of this province each town has 2-3 locale chapels built, the whole province comprised 71 locale, and barangay chapels.

== Superstitions and local legends and beliefs ==
Prior to colonization, the region had a complex religious system which involved various deities. These deities include: Gugurang, the supreme god who dwells inside of Mount Mayon where he guards and protects the sacred fire in which an Aswang (local version of witches and monsters) and, his brother was trying to steal. Whenever people disobey his orders, wishes and commit numerous sins, he would cause Mount Mayon to burst lava as a sign of warning for people to mend their crooked ways. Ancient Bikolanos had a rite performed for him called Atang.; Asuang, the evil god who always tries to steal the sacred fire of Mount Mayon from his brother, Gugurang. Addressed sometimes as Aswang, he dwells mainly inside Mount Malinao. As an evil god, he would cause the people to suffer misfortunes and commit sins. Enemy of Gugurang and a friend of Bulan the god of the Moon; Haliya, the masked goddess of the moonlight and the archenemy of Bakunawa and protector of Bulan. Her cult is composed primarily of women. There is also a ritual dance named after her as it is performed to be a countermeasure against Bakunawa.; Bulan, the god of the pale moon, he is depicted as a pubescent boy with uncommon comeliness that made savage beast and the vicious mermaids (Magindara) tame. He has deep affection towards Magindang, but plays with him by running away so that Magindang would never catch him. The reason for this is because he is shy to the man that he loves. If Magindang manages to catch Bulan, Haliya always comes to free him from Magindang's grip; Magindang, the god of the sea and all its creatures. He has deep affection to the lunar god Bulan and pursues him despite never catching him. Due to this, the Bicolanos reasoned that it is to why the waves rise to reach the Moon when seen from the distant horizon. Whenever he does catch up to Bulan, Haliya comes to rescue Bulan and free him immediately; Okot, god of forest and hunting; and Bakunawa, a gigantic sea serpent deity who is often considered as the cause of eclipses, the devourer of the Sun and the Noon, and an adversary of Haliya as Bakunawa's main aim is to swallow Bulan, who Haliya swore to protect for all of eternity.

== Economy ==
Poverty incidence of Sorsogon (%)

Source: Philippine Statistics Authority

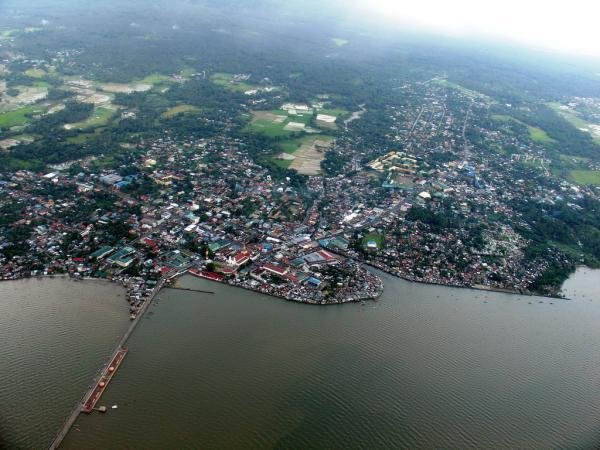
Aerial view of Sorsogon City

The province's economic activity is highly concentrated in its capital city, Sorsogon City, and the towns of Bulan, Irosin, Gubat, Pilar and Matnog as well. Sorsogon Province is classified as 2nd class with an average annual income of ₱339.4M (C.Ys. 2000–2003). This is about ₱11M short for the province to attain 1st class reclassification which requires at least ₱350M average annual income.

The province had a great contribution on the 97-percent growth in investments for the first quarter of 2008 and increasing tourism arrivals that buoyed the Bicol Region economy, despite the damage brought about by incessant rains and a rice shortage. This is according to the Quarterly Regional Economic Situationer (QRES) released by the National Economic and Development Authority (NEDA) Regional Office in Bicol (NRO 5).

Among the provinces, Sorsogon posted the highest growth (293% respectively) in investments from the previous year. Next to Sorsogon is Catanduanes that posted a growth of 280%. Albay contributed 39 percent to the region's investments and posted a growth of 221% from the preceding quarter.

“For the third time, Bicol Region hosted the kick-off of Asia's premier extreme sailing event, the Philippine Hobie Challenge last February 16 at Gubat, Sorsogon. This 260-mile journey from Gubat-Sambuyan-Bacsal-Marambut-Suluan to Siargao enticed both local and foreign water sports enthusiasts. It opened the opportunity for the municipality of Gubat to showcase the town's best,” the QRES stated.

Ranked from main sources of income, 40% of families in the province derived incomes from entrepreneurial activities, 33% from salaries and wages, and 27% from income from other sources such as rental incomes, interests, and overseas Filipino remittances.

== Infrastructure ==
=== Transportation ===
==== Road ====
The Pan-Philippine Highway (N1/AH26), is the highway backbone network, and the secondary and tertiary roads interconnect most cities and municipalities in Pilar, Castilla, Sorsogon City, Casiguran, Juban, Irosin before ending at Matnog at the ferry terminal.

In order to spur development in the province, The Toll Regulatory Board declared Toll Road 5 the extension of South Luzon Expressway. A 420-kilometer, four lane expressway starting from the terminal point of the now under construction SLEX Toll Road 4 at Barangay Mayao, Lucena City in Quezon to Matnog, Sorsogon, near the Matnog Ferry Terminal. On August 25, 2020, San Miguel Corporation announced that they will invest the project which will reduce travel time from Lucena to Matnog from 9 hours to 5.5 hours.

==== Seaports ====
The Matnog Ferry Terminal provides access to the island of Northern Samar in Allen.

== Culture ==
=== Festivals ===
==== Town fiestas ====
Most of the inhabitants of the province belong to the ethnolinguistic Bicolano and Bisakol groups. Sorsogueños are religious, being mostly Roman Catholics, and are active in festivities celebrated throughout the year. Each town honors their Patron Saint with celebration on its Feast Day. In Sorsogon City, the locals celebrate the Fiesta of the Patron Saints Peter and Paul every June 28–29 annually. Another featured attraction during town fiestas are the traveling carnivals set up near the town center. In Gubat, Feast Day is celebrated on June 13 in honor of St Anthony of Padua. In Juban, which shares the same patron saint as Gubat, Sorsogon, the townsfolk celebrate Feast Day on June 20.

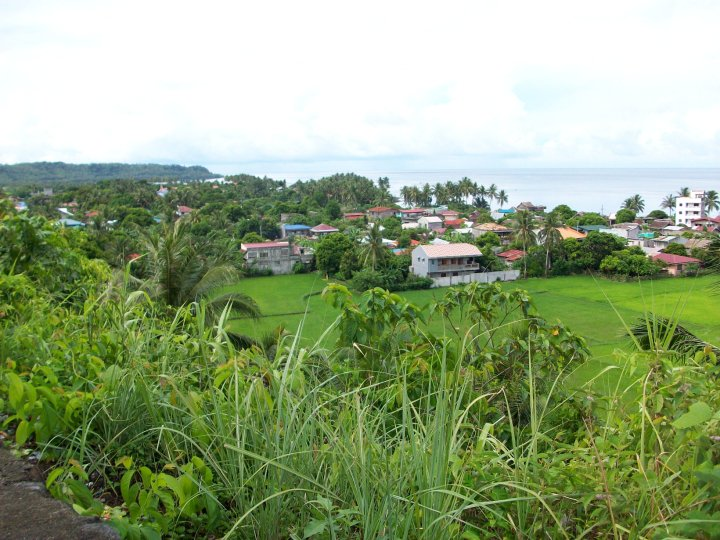
Downtown Bulusan located east of the province

- Kasanggayahan Festival — celebrated in the whole province in the last week of October, commemorates the founding of Sorsogon as a province. Festivities include a series of cultural, historical, religious, agro-industrial and economic activities, showcasing the province's abundant agricultural products, particularly food and decorative items. One of the main activities and highlight of the festival is the Pantomina sa Tinampo, it is a kind of cultural-ethnic street dance native to the province. Hundreds of men and women participated, clad in colorful traditional Filipino couture while dancing barefoot as they parade around the city.

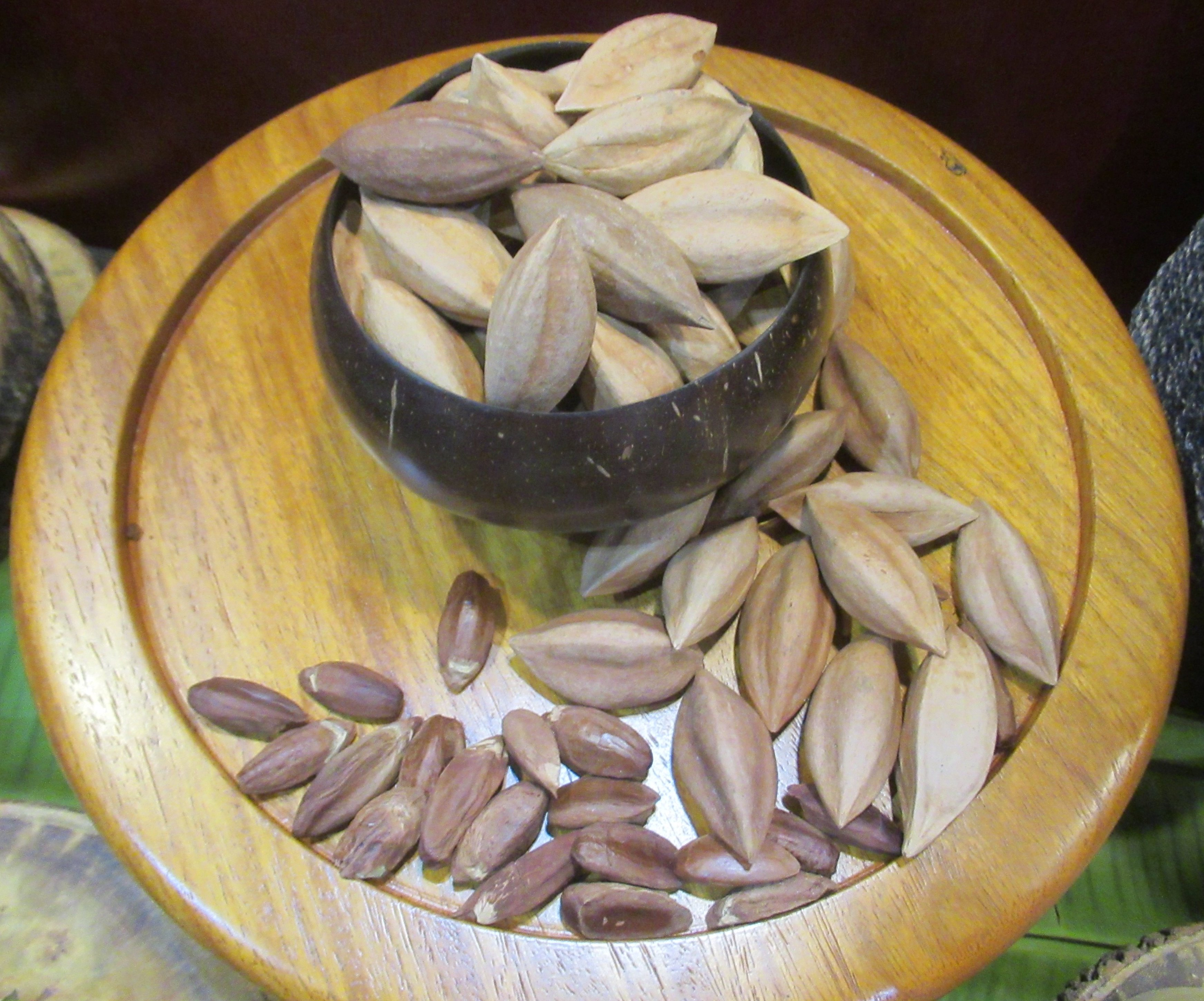
Pili nuts (unshelled and roasted)

- Pili Festival — in Sorsogon City, honors the Pili nut and tree which is indigenous to province. The festival coincides with the town fiesta of Sorsogon City. Celebrations include street dancing by locals donning pili nut costumes, cooking competitions, fireworks displays, color run, and even a nutcracking session along the road by the locals.
  - On February 21, 2024, the Department of Agriculture formally introduced a new product, Sorsoganon’s Pili Milk at SM City Sorsogon. It is made from pili nut hard shell (exocarp) or kernel. Currently, the Bicol Region has 13,435 farmers that cultivate 142,405 hectares pili plantation. Hence, the Sorsogon Provincial Pili Development Board will petition for declaration of the province as the "Pili Capital of the Philippines".
- Parau Festival – Pilar, Sorsogon celebrates Parau Festival every October. The Festival coincides with the town fiesta of Pilar. Events include Inter-High School Sportsfest, DLC Competition, Parau Street Dancing Competition, Color Run, Palarong Bayan.
- Ginubat Festival – from Gubat, Sorsogon, a festival based on the roots of the town of which its name was derived. It features the following activities: cultural street parade, exhibit, sail boat race, beauty pageant, fiesta celebration and the Balik Gubat which is the highlight of the festival.

=== Minorities ===
Minorities include Muslim immigrants from Mindanao, who engage in street vending and small shop businesses. A mosque is situated inside Sitio Bolangan on the outskirts of the city. A significant small Chinese population are owners of hardware stores and commodity shops and dwell in the business center. Indian communities are also present and are Hindus. They are typically known to engage in money lending businesses—colloquially called "five-six".

== Government ==
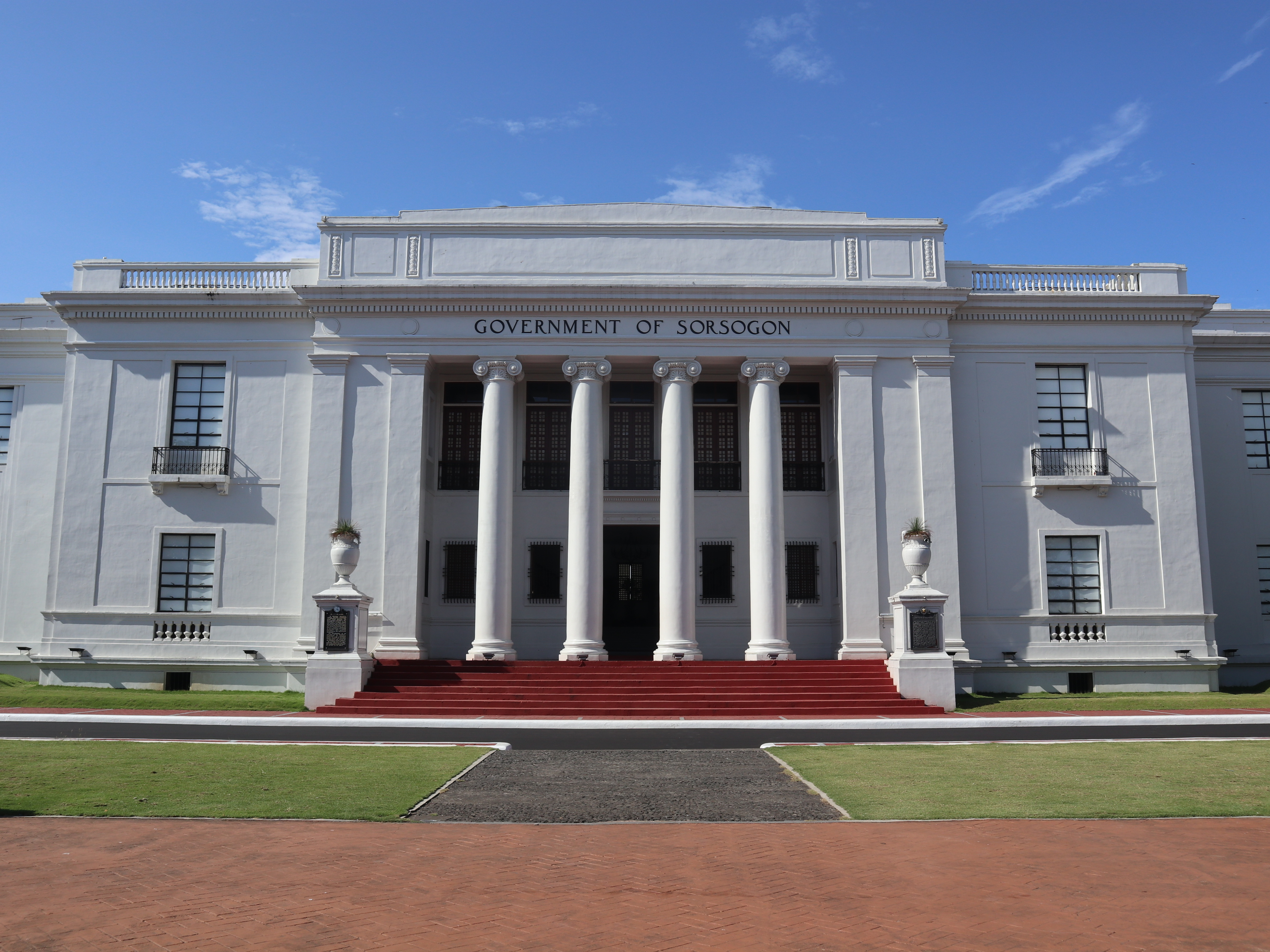
Sorsogon Provincial Capitol

Sorsogon is subdivided into 2 Congressional Districts. The 1st Congressional District comprises the City of Sorsogon and towns of Pilar, Donsol, and Castilla. The Sorsogon Provincial Capitol is located in the City of Sorsogon.

Current Provincial Government Officials (2025-2028)

- Governor: Jose Edwin B. Hamor (NPC)
- Vice-Governor: Krunimar Antonio D. Escudero (NPC)

Sangguniang Panlalawigan Members

1st District

- Maria O. Ravanilla (NPC)
- Edmundo A. Atutubo (NPC)
- Rommel John C. Mella (NPC)
- Luis C. Leosala Jr. (NPC)
- Fernando David H. Duran (NPC)

2nd District

- Ramil M. Robles (NPC)
- Benito L. Doma (NPC)
- Rolando R. Añonuevo (NPC)
- Eduardo E. Ong Jr. (NPC)
- Christian D. Lim (NPC)

Ex-Officio Members

- Jose Arturo Enano (President, Liga ng mga Barangay)
- Ramon H. Escudero (President, PCL)
- Karl Marx H. Lozada (President, Panlalawigang Pederasyon ng Sangguniang Kabataan)

=== House of Representatives ===
| District | Representative | Party | Term | Bloc |
|---|---|---|---|---|
| 1st | Marie Bernadette G. Escudero-Quirante | NPC | 2 | Majority |
| 2nd | Manuel L. Fortes Jr. | NPC | 2 | Majority |

== See also ==
- Spanish ship Santísima Trinidad (1751)
