= Lake Bulusan =

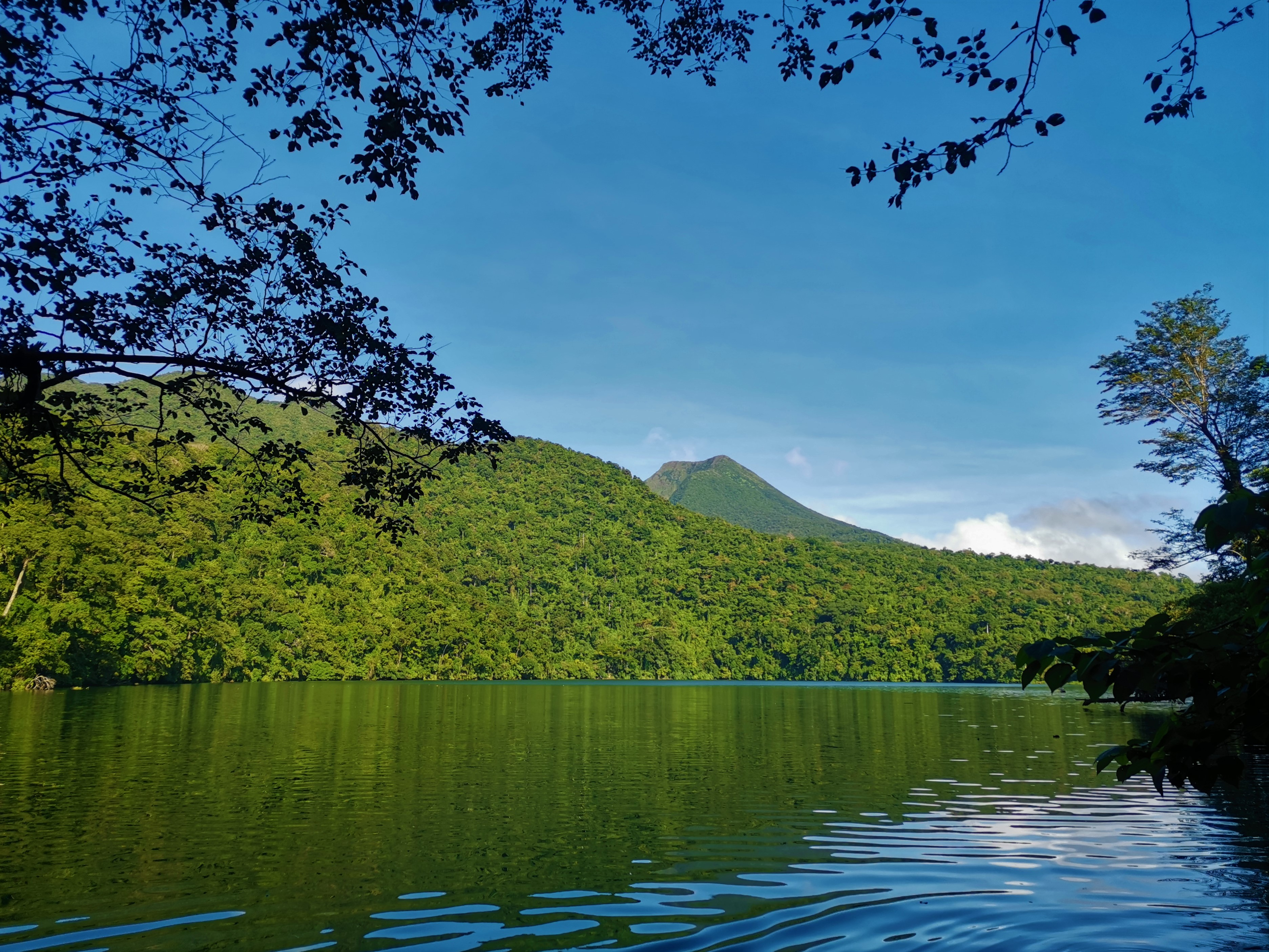
- The lake on the slope of Bulusan Volcano

- Location within Sorsogon Lake Bulusan (Philippines)
- Location: Luzon Island
- Coordinates: 12°45′14″N 124°5′35″E
- Type: Crater lake
- Basin countries: Philippines
- Surface area: 27.6 hectares (68 acres)
- Shore length^{1}: 2.2 kilometres (1.4 mi)
- Surface elevation: 360 metres (1,180 ft)
- ^{1} Shore length is not a well-defined measure.

Lake Bulusan is a lake on Luzon Island in the Philippines. It lies at the heart of Bulusan Volcano National Park which covers a land area of 3,672 hectares (9,070 acres). It has an elevation of 360 metres (1,180 ft) and is located on the southeast flank of Mount Bulusan, an active volcano.

The lake is accessible either through the Maharlika Highway up to the town of Irosin passing through the towns of Casiguran and Juban. From Irosin it is another ten kilometers to the site. The other is passing through a very scenic route overlooking the Pacific Ocean (San Bernardino Strait) through the towns of Gubat, Barcelona and the center of Bulusan town.

== Physical characteristics ==
Bulusan Lake is formed by tectonic damming and perhaps another crater of a volcano. Its water is greenish and its waterbed is rocky and sandy and parts are muddy.

== Fauna ==
It is home to some endemic species of freshwater fish. It also supports some birds, mammals and some beehives. It is completely surrounded by tropical rainforest.

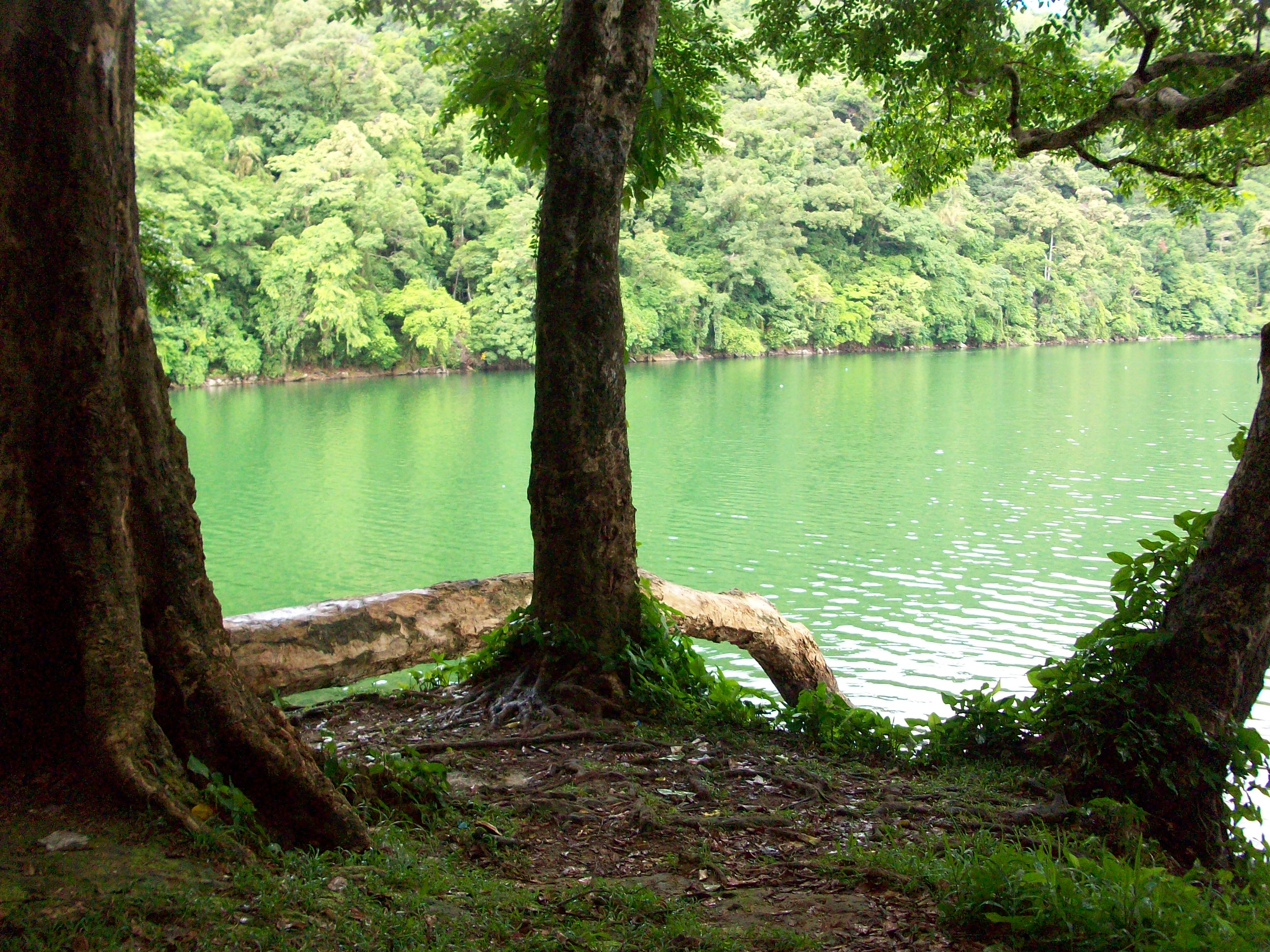
Bulusan Lake east side

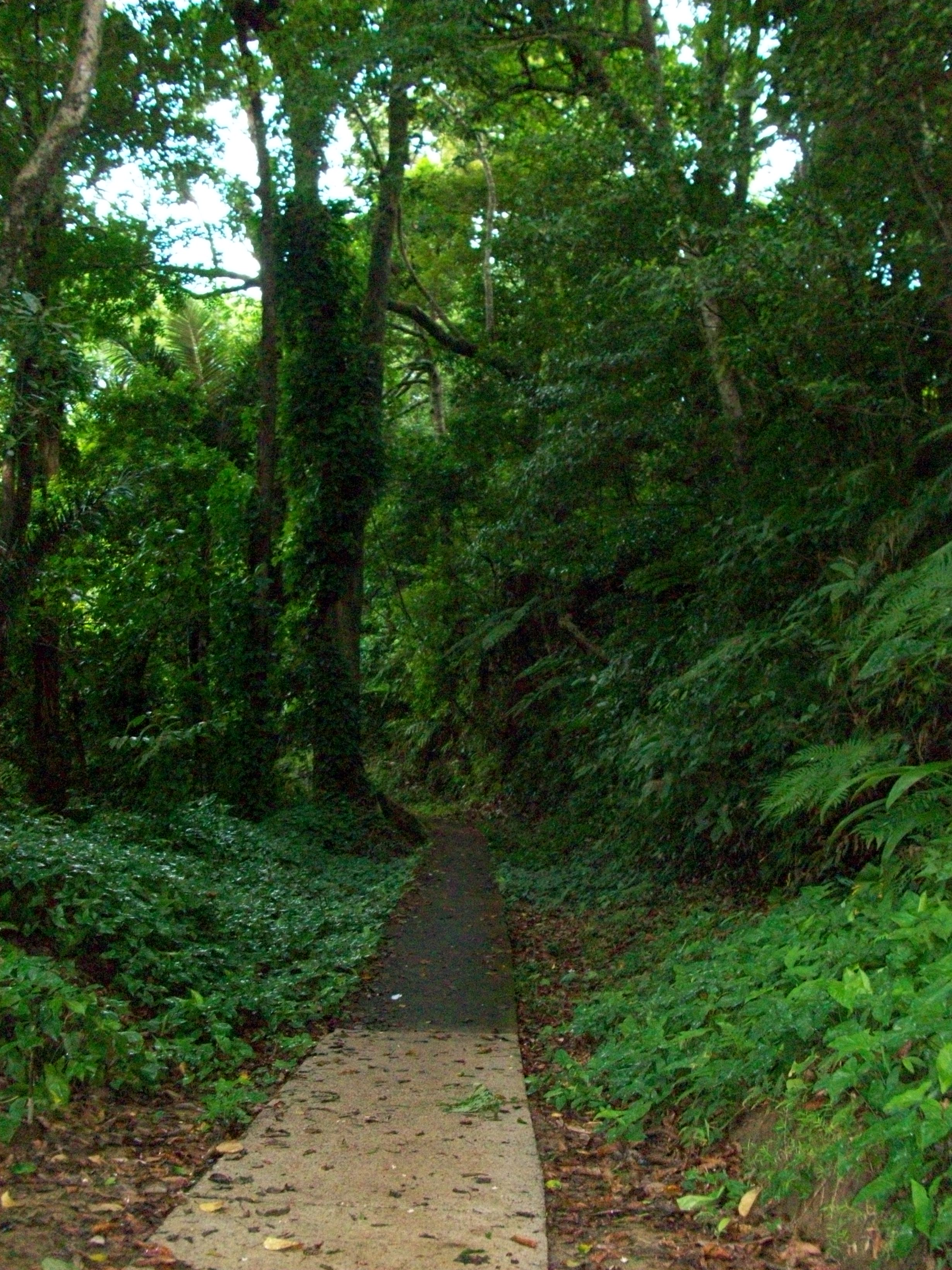
Bulusan Lake Loop Way
