= Mount Bulusan =

Volcano in the Philippines

- Bulusan Volcano
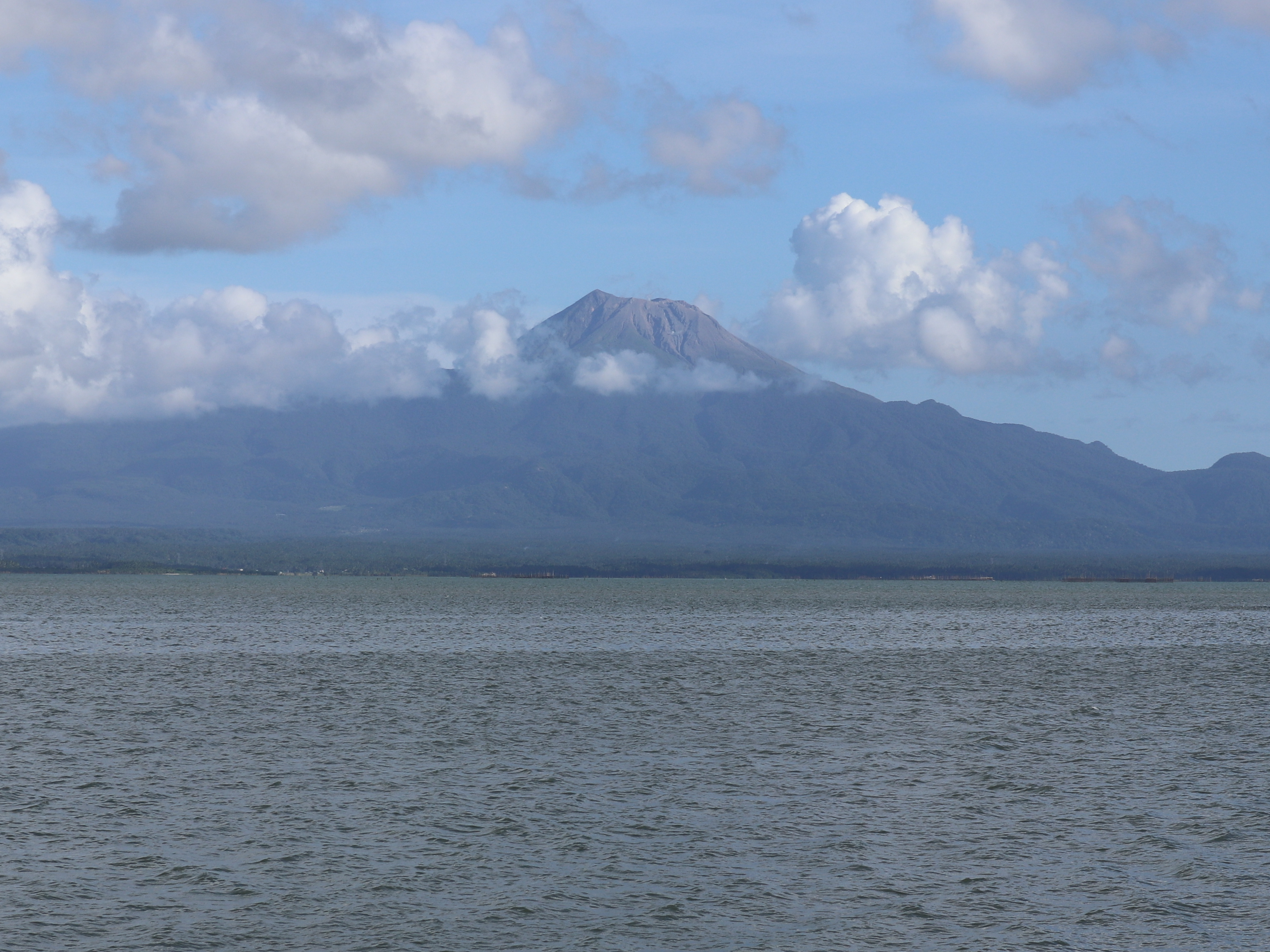
- Mount Bulusan view from Sorsogon City Coastal Road

Highest point
- Elevation: 1,565 m (5,135 ft)
- Prominence: 1,546.86 m (5,075.0 ft)
- Listing: Ultra; Ribu; active volcano
- Coordinates: 12°46′08″N 124°03′22″E

Geography
- Location within Sorsogon Location within Luzon Location within Philippines
- Country: Philippines
- Region: Bicol Region
- Province: Sorsogon
- City/municipality: Barcelona; Bulusan; Casiguran; Gubat; Irosin; Juban

Geology
- Mountain type: Stratovolcano
- Volcanic arc: Bicol Volcanic Arc
- Last eruption: May 1, 2025

Mount Bulusan, also known as Bulusan Volcano, is a stratovolcano on the island of Luzon in the Philippines. Located in the province of Sorsogon in the Bicol Region, it is 70 kilometres (43 mi) southeast of Mayon Volcano and approximately 390 kilometres (240 mi) southeast of Manila. Bulusan is one of the active volcanoes in the Philippines. The 1818 census showed 1,777 native families paying tribute and they were coexisting with 19 Spanish-Filipino families in the area.

== Physical features ==
Bulusan is classified by volcanologists as a stratovolcano (or a composite cone) and covers the northeast rim of Irosin caldera that was formed about 36,000 years ago. It has a peak elevation of 1,535 m (5,036 ft) above sea level with a base diameter of 15 km (9.3 mi).

Around the mountain are four craters and four hot springs. The first crater, called Blackbird Lake, is 20 m (66 ft) in diameter and 15 m (49 ft) deep. The second crater is oval, with dimensions of 60 by 30 m (197 by 98 ft) and 15 m (49 ft). The third crater is about 90 m (300 ft) in diameter and 20 m (66 ft) deep, while the fourth, which is near the northeastern rim opened during the 1981 eruption. There is also a 100-metre (330 ft) fissure measuring 5 to 8 m (16 to 26 ft) wide below this crater.

The volcano's hot springs are:

- Mapaso
- Masacrot
- San Benon
- San Vicente

Adjacent volcanic edifices are:

- Mount Batuan
- Mount Binitacan
- Mount Calaunan
- Mount Calungalan
- Mount Homahan
- Mount Jormajan
- Mount Juban
- Mount Tabon-Tabon

== Eruptions ==
Bulusan is generally known for its sudden, steam-driven or phreatic explosions. It has erupted 15 times since 2016 and is the fourth most active volcano in the Philippines after Mayon, Taal, and Kanlaon.

== Evacuation procedures ==
There are evacuation procedures in place for parts of the peninsula; the farms nearest the volcano are to be evacuated, and many village schools will be closed if a more destructive eruption is possible.

== Eruptive History ==
=== March–June 2006 ===
The Philippine Institute of Volcanology and Seismology (PHIVOLCS) declared alert level 1 on March 19, after it recorded increased seismic unrest. On June 8, volcanologists raised the alert level to 2 (moderate level of seismic unrest) after the volcano spewed ash. On June 9, the resulting ash cloud damaged a number of houses in the nearby town of Casiguran, 5 kilometres (3.1 mi) north of the volcano, and reached Sorsogon City, about 20 kilometres (12 mi) north of Bulusan.

On June 13, volcanologists said new craters were created by mild explosions. Aside from the new craters, two of the volcano's existing four craters appeared to have merged and cracks were observed on the western rim of the summit crater. Another eruption took place on April 8, 2007.

=== July–October 2007 ===
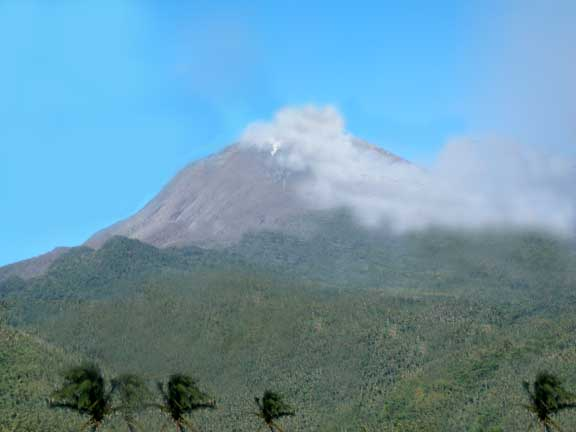
Mount Bulusan in active mode in February 2007

Following some signs of volcanic activity, on the morning of July 31, 9:37 am (local time), there was a loud explosion described by locals as "like a bomb going off". A cloud of steam and ash shot into the air from Mount Bulusan to a height of 5 kilometres (3.1 mi), drifting and blanketing the surrounding countryside. The eruption lasted for 20 minutes.

=== November 2010 ===
On November 7, PHIVOLCS recorded increased seismic activity at Bulusan Volcano, 24 hours after it spewed a 600-metre (2,000 ft) ash column and grayish steam on November 5. State volcanologists noted that at least 10 volcanic earthquakes and four explosion-type events were documented after the emission of ash and steam at 8 a.m. on November 5. PHIVOLCS also noted that steaming activity was characterized by strong emission of white steam column that reached a maximum height of 200 meters above the crater rim. It warned the public not to enter the four-kilometer permanent danger zone from the volcano. People near the valleys and streams were also advised to be "extra alert" against sediment-laden stream flows in the event of heavy rains. More ash ejection was reported on November 8–9, with ash fall in Juban and Irosin. A PHIVOLCS bulletin on November 9 stated that eight volcanic earthquakes were recorded from the volcano during the past 24 hours and weak to moderate emission of ash explosion was observed. PHIVOLCS also warned residents near valleys and streams against sediment-laden stream flows in the event of heavy and continuous rainfall.

=== February 2011 ===
After months of little activity, the volcano suddenly erupted and released a plume of ash 2 kilometres (1.2 mi) high, after water reacted with the hot magma. PHIVOLCS said such explosions were likely to continue for the coming weeks. Initially, hundreds of nearby residents evacuated on their own, but the government stepped in to evacuate thousands more, and imposed a 4-kilometre (2.5 mi) travel ban around the crater. They also advised airplanes to avoid the immediate perimeter due to ash and debris in the air.

=== May–June 2015 ===
Mount Bulusan ejected a 250 m (820 ft) ash plume on May 1, at around 9:46 pm, lasting for 3.5 minutes. The incident was classified as a "minor explosion event" by PHIVOLCS leading to the raising of alert level 1 (abnormal activity) for the surrounding area. A second ash explosion lasting for five minutes also occurred on the same day. PHIVOLCS determined the cause of the eruptions to be hydrothermal activity beneath the volcano. People were advised not to enter the 4 km (2.5 mi) permanent danger zone. Further advisories were given to low-flying aircraft against the dangers of sudden phreatic eruptions, and to local residents near rivers and streams in case of lahar flows. There were also concerns that rains from Typhoon Noul could trigger lahars and mudslides near the mountain. However, after Noul recurved to the north, the threat did not materialize and the evacuees were permitted to return to their homes.

On June 16, Mount Bulusan generated two volcanic eruptions with the first one recorded at 11:02 am which lasted for 10 minutes producing a one kilometer high grayish steam and ash plume and accompanied by rumbling sounds. The second one was recorded at 11:20 am which lasted for a minute producing only a small ash plume. On June 18, the volcano once again erupted but was not observed visually due to thick clouds covering the summit. Prior to the eruption, rumbling sounds was heard between 5:00 am to 7:00 am by residents of the village of Monbon in Irosin town. The next day, June 19, Bulusan erupted yet again at around 2:55 pm producing a 1.5-kilometer high ash plume.

=== June 2016 ===
On June 10, almost a year after its last eruption, Mount Bulusan erupted again at 11:35 am. The eruption lasted for five minutes and generated an ash plume measuring 6,562 feet or some 2,000 meters. According to PHIVOLCS, the eruption was phreatic in nature and had a shallow source, with the ash drifting northwest to the direction of Juban town. While the PHIVOLCS did not raise the alert level 1 in the volcano, it advised residents not to enter the four-kilometer permanent danger zone and warned pilots not to fly near the volcano.

=== December 2016 ===
On December 29, Mount Bulusan had a phreatic eruption, shooting a plume of ash about two kilometers high. It happened 2:40 pm local time and lasted for about 16 minutes. The eruption prompted PHIVOLCS to raise Alert level 1 for the surrounding areas and remind the public not to enter the 4-kilometer radius permanent danger zone.

=== July 2020 ===
PHIVOLCS raised the alert status of Bulusan Volcano from alert level 0 to alert level 1 after an increase in seismic activity was observed in the past days.

Timelapse video of Bulusan Volcano after its eruption on June 12, 2022

=== May 2021 ===
On May 11, PHIVOLCS raised the alert status of Bulusan Volcano from alert level 0 to alert level 1 due to increased seismic activity since May 8.

=== August 2021 ===
On August 18, PHIVOLCS lowered the alert level of Bulusan from alert level 1 (low-level unrest) to alert level 0 (normal) after the volcano returned to normalcy following a general decline in volcanic earthquakes, ground deformation, gas emission, and surface activity.

=== June 2022 ===
On June 5, PHIVOLCS reported that Mount Bulusan had a phreatic eruption with a height of about one kilometer, and the alert level status was raised to alert level 1. Ash fall was reported in Juban and Casiguran. The DOH advised the public to remain indoors. The local government of Juban ordered residents to evacuate from affected areas. The NDRRMC reported at least 180 individuals from Juban were evacuated. On June 12, a phreatic eruption took place at 3:37 am (local time) and lasted for about 18 minutes.

=== April 2025 ===
At 4:36 am on April 28, Bulusan underwent a phreatic eruption that lasted 24 minutes and emitted a bent plume that rose 4,500 meters above the crater before drifting to the general west. A pyroclastic density current (PDC) descended the southwestern slopes, traveling within 3 kilometers from the summit vent of the volcano. The eruption prompted PHIVOLCS to raise Alert Level 1 on the volcano again. Sixty-one people were evacuated from the vicinity. A second phreatic eruption occurred at 7:43 pm on April 29, lasting for 1 hour and 17 minutes and emitting a plume that drifted southwest.

== Monitoring ==
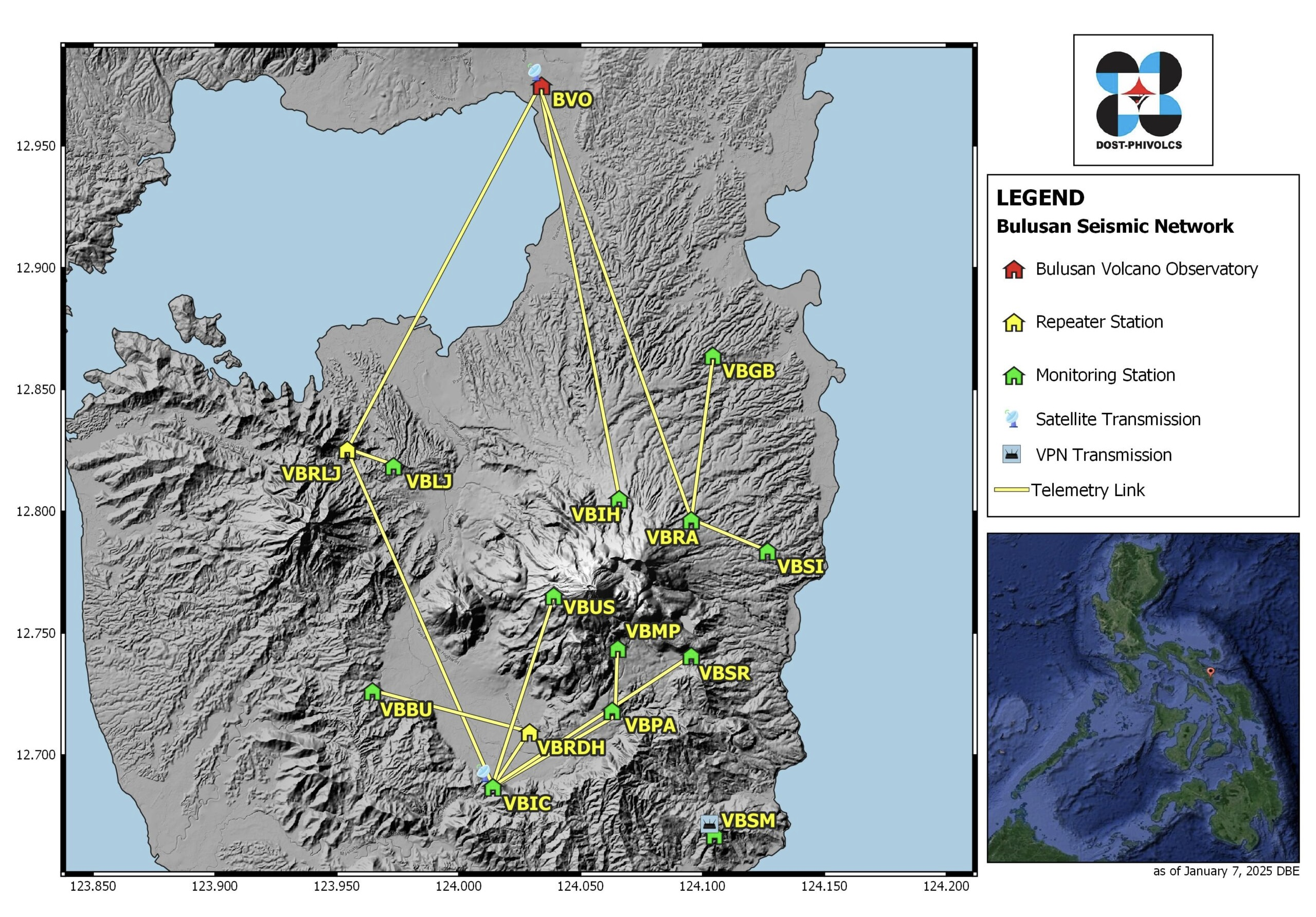
Bulusan Volcano's Seismic Monitoring Network

=== Alert levels ===
PHIVOLCS maintains a distinct Alert Level system for six volcanoes in the Philippines, including Bulusan Volcano. There are six levels in the system, numbered 0 to 5.

Bulusan Volcano Alert Level Scheme
Alert Level	Criteria	Interpretation/Recommendation
0 (Quiet or No Alert)	All monitored parameters within background levels. Unremarkable level of volcanic earthquakes occurring within the volcano area. Generally weak steam emission.	Quiescence; no magmatic eruption is foreseen. However, there are hazards (explosions, rockfalls and landslides) that may suddenly occur within the four-kilometer radius Permanent Danger Zone (PDZ).
1 (Low-level of volcanic unrest)	Slight increase in volcanic earthquake and steam/gas activity. Sporadic explosions from existing or new vents. Notable increase in the temperature of hot springs. Slight inflation or swelling of the edifice.	Hydrothermal, magmatic, or tectonic disturbances. The source of activity is shallow, near crater or in the vicinity of Irosin Caldera. Entry into the PDZ must be prohibited.
2 (Moderate Level of Volcanic Unrest)	Elevated levels of any of the following: volcanic earthquake, steam/gas emission, ground deformation and hot spring temperature. Intermittent steam/ash explosion and above baseline Sulfur Dioxide (SO2) emission rates. Increased swelling of volcanic edifice.	Probable intrusion of magma at depth, which can lead to magmatic eruption. Entry within PDZ must be prohibited. Other areas within five (5) kilometers of the active vent may be included in the danger zone.
3 (High Level of Volcanic Unrest)	Sustained increases in the levels of volcanic earthquakes, some may be perceptible. Occurrence of low-frequency earthquakes, volcanic tremor, rumbling sounds. Forceful and voluminous steam/ash ejections. Sustained increases in SO2 emission rates, ground deformation/swelling of the edifice. Activity at the summit may involve dome growth and/or lava flow, resultant rockfall.	Magma is near or at the surface, and activity could lead to hazardous eruption in weeks. Danger zones may be expanded up to eight (8) kilometers from the active crater.
4 (Hazardous eruption imminent)	Intensifying unrest characterized by earthquake swarms and volcanic tremor, many perceptible. Frequent strong ash explosions. Sustained increase, or sudden drop, of SO2 emission. Increasing rates of ground deformation and swelling of the edifice. Lava dome growth and/or lava flow increases, with increased frequency and volume of rockfall.	Magmatic processes or effusive eruption underway, which can progress into highly hazardous eruption. Danger Zone may be extended up to nine (9) kilometers or more from the active crater.
5 (Hazardous eruption in progress)	Magmatic eruption characterized by explosive production of tall ash-laden eruption columns, or by massive collapses of summit lava dome. Generation of deadly pyroclastic flows, surges and/or lateral blasts and widespread ashfall.	Life-threatening eruption producing volcanic hazards that endanger communities. Additional danger areas may be declared as eruption progresses.

==== Stand-down procedures ====
In order to minimize unnecessary changes in declaration of Alert Levels, the following periods shall be observed:

- From Alert Level 5 → 4: Wait at least 24 hours after hazardous activity stops.
- From Alert Level 4 → 3 or 2: Wait at least 2 weeks after activity drops below Level 4.
- From Alert Level 3 → 2: Wait 2 weeks after activity drops below Level 3.

== See also ==
- Bulusan Volcano Natural Park
- List of volcanoes in the Philippines
  - List of active volcanoes in the Philippines
  - List of potentially active volcanoes in the Philippines
  - List of inactive volcanoes in the Philippines
