= Barcelona, Sorsogon =

Municipality in Sorsogon, Philippines

Barcelona
- Municipality
- Municipality of Barcelona
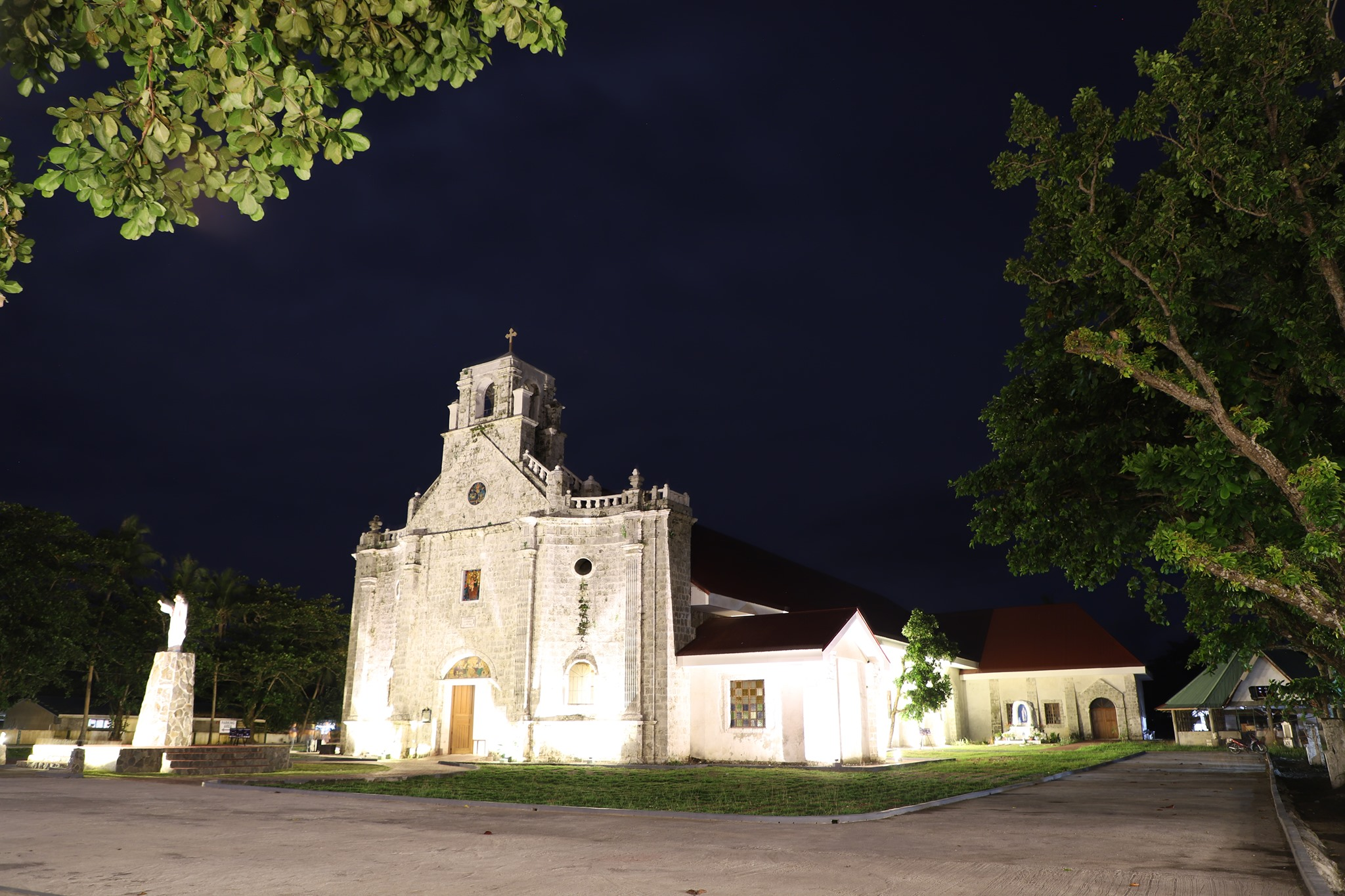
- Parroquia de San Jose

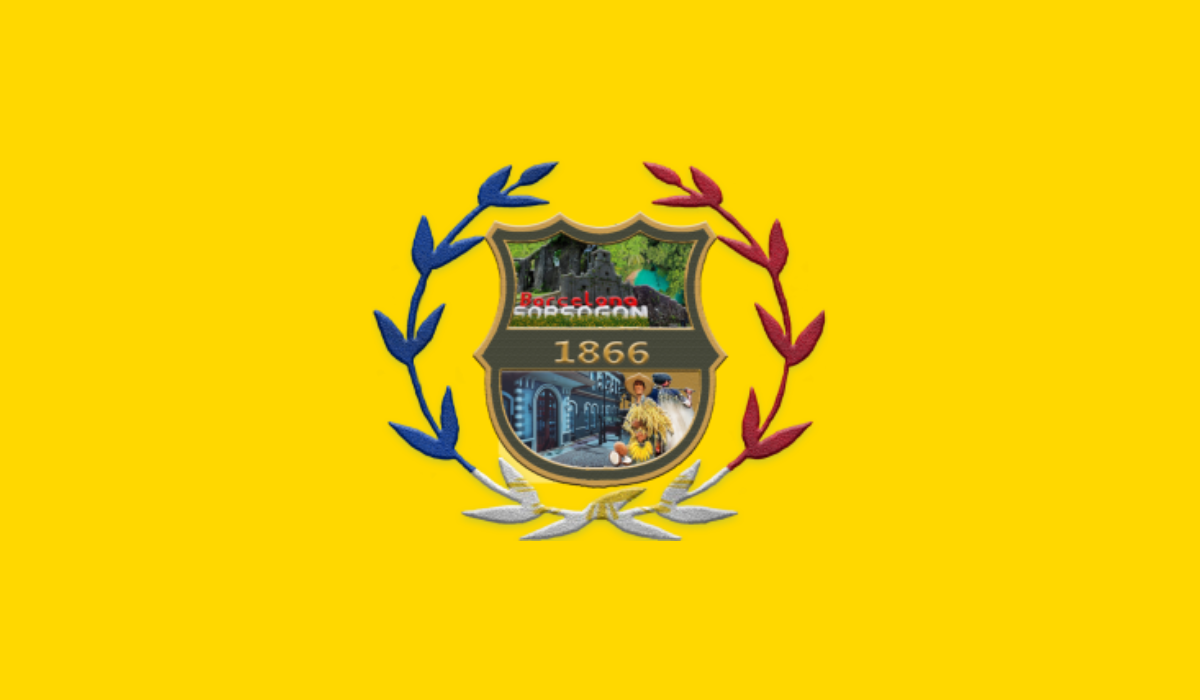
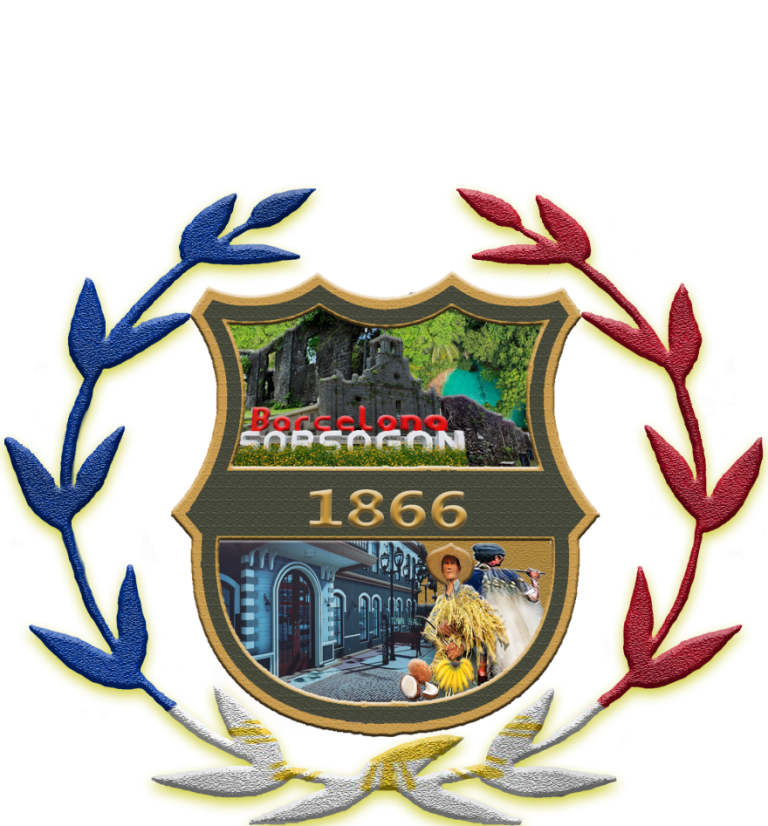
- Flag Seal
- Nickname: Catalonia of Asia
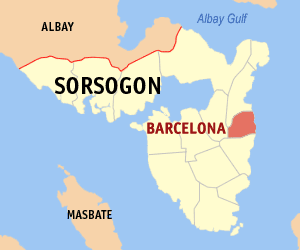
- Map of Sorsogon with Barcelona highlighted
- Interactive map of Barcelona
- Location within the Philippines
- Coordinates: 12°52′10″N 124°08′31″E
- Country: Philippines
- Region: Bicol Region
- Province: Sorsogon
- District: 2nd district
- Founded: April 16, 1886
- Named for: Barcelona, Catalonia
- Barangays: 25 (see Barangays)

Government
  - Type: Sangguniang Bayan
  - Mayor: Cynthia G. Falcotelo-Fortes
  - Vice Mayor: Isabel Esmeria
  - Representative: Manuel L. Fortes, Jr
  - Municipal Council: Members: Marjohn G. Buenaobra; Chona F. Figueroa; Nida B. Datur; Eugene F. Azore; Mark Ian Ben E. Baldoza; Jona A. Falcotelo; Isabel D. Esmeria; Joel E. Fuenzalida
  - Electorate: 16,676 voters (2025)

Area
  - Total: 61.18 km^{2} (23.62 sq mi)
- Elevation: 18 m (59 ft)
- Highest elevation: 126 m (413 ft)
- Lowest elevation: 0 m (0 ft)

Population (2024 census)
  - Total: 21,911
  - Density: 358.1/km^{2} (927.6/sq mi)
  - Households: 5,255

Economy
  - Income class: 4th municipal income class
  - Poverty incidence: 31.45% (2023)
  - Revenue: ₱ 221.3 million (2024)
  - Assets: ₱ 548.7 million (2024)
  - Expenditure: ₱ 192 million (2024)
  - Liabilities: ₱ 82.97 million (2024)

Service provider
  - Electricity: Sorsogon 2 Electric Cooperative (SORECO 2)
- Time zone: UTC+8 (PST)
- ZIP code: 4712
- PSGC: 0506202000
- IDD : area code: +63 (0)56
- Native languages: Sorsogon language Tagalog
- Website: www.barcelona.gov.ph

Barcelona, officially the Municipality of Barcelona (Waray Sorsogon: Bungto san Barcelona; Waray: Bungto han Barcelona, Tagalog: Bayan ng Barcelona), is a municipality in the province of Sorsogon, Philippines. According to the 2024 census, it has a population of 21,911 people.

== History ==
The site of Barcelona was originally part of Gubat and Bulusan. The town's name was known as Danlog, taken from the name of a local river. The change of name to Barcelona was recommended by a Spanish official who saw some similarities with Barcelona, Catalonia (Spain). On April 16, 1886, it became a pueblo civil. Until 1868, it was part of the parish of St. James the Great of Bulusan. After 1868, it took St. Joseph as its patron saint and celebrates their town fiesta on May 19.

For most of the Fourth and Fifth Republics, it was governed by Mayors Rustico Estopace and Salvador Estuye.

== Geography ==
Barcelona is bounded by Gubat in the north, Bulusan in the south, Casiguran in the west, and the Philippine Sea in the east.

=== Barangays ===
Barcelona is politically subdivided into 25 barangays. Each barangay consists of puroks and some have sitios.

In 1957, the name of barrio Paghaluban was changed to Peña Francia.

- Alegria
- Bagacay
- Bangate
- Bugtong
- Cagang
- Fabrica
- Jibong
- Lago
- Layog
- Luneta
- Macabari
- Mapapac
- Olandia
- Paghaluban
- Poblacion Central
- Poblacion Norte
- Poblacion Sur
- Putiao
- San Antonio
- San Isidro
- San Ramon (Tan-awan)
- San Vicente
- Santa Cruz
- Santa Lourdes
- Tagdon

=== Climate ===
Climate data for Barcelona, Sorsogon
Month	Jan	Feb	Mar	Apr	May	Jun	Jul	Aug	Sep	Oct	Nov	Dec	Year
Mean daily maximum °C (°F)	27 (81)	28 (82)	29 (84)	31 (88)	31 (88)	30 (86)	29 (84)	29 (84)	29 (84)	29 (84)	29 (84)	28 (82)	29 (84)
Mean daily minimum °C (°F)	22 (72)	21 (70)	22 (72)	23 (73)	24 (75)	25 (77)	25 (77)	25 (77)	25 (77)	24 (75)	23 (73)	23 (73)	24 (74)
Average precipitation mm (inches)	65 (2.6)	44 (1.7)	42 (1.7)	39 (1.5)	87 (3.4)	150 (5.9)	184 (7.2)	153 (6.0)	163 (6.4)	154 (6.1)	127 (5.0)	100 (3.9)	1,308 (51.4)
Average rainy days	13.9	9.2	11.0	12.5	19.6	24.3	26.5	25.0	25.5	24.4	19.4	15.1	226.4
Source: Meteoblue

== Demographics ==
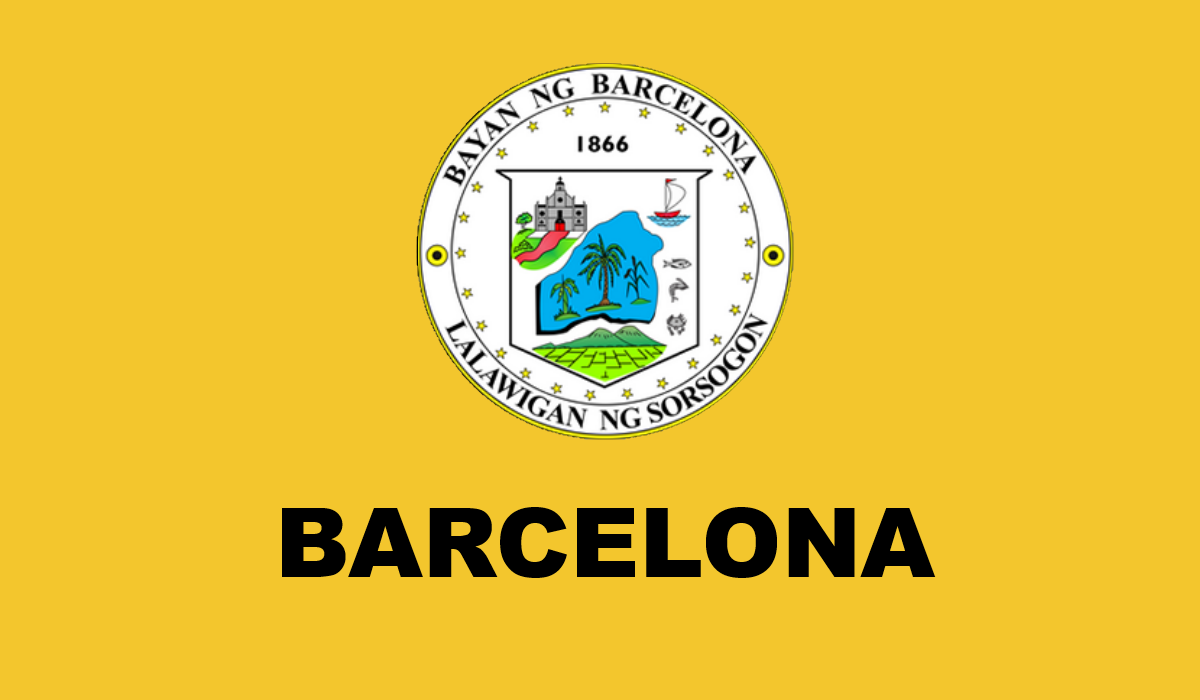
Former flag of Barcelona before 2019

Former seal of Barcelona before 2019

Population census of Barcelona
Year	Pop.	±% p.a.
1903	6,001	—
1918	9,044	+2.77%
1939	8,968	−0.04%
1948	9,287	+0.39%
1960	14,478	+3.77%
1970	13,845	−0.45%
1975	14,406	+0.80%
1980	16,063	+2.20%
1990	16,251	+0.12%
1995	18,405	+2.36%
2000	19,041	+0.73%
2007	19,428	+0.28%
2010	20,340	+1.68%
2015	20,990	+0.60%
2020	20,987	−0.00%
2024	21,911	+1.04%
Source: Philippine Statistics Authority

== Economy ==
Poverty incidence of Barcelona (%)

Source: Philippine Statistics Authority

== Education ==
The Barcelona Schools District Office governs all educational institutions within the municipality. It oversees the management and operations of all private and public, from primary to secondary schools.

=== Primary and elementary schools ===
- Alegria Elementary School
- Badang Elementary School
- Bagacay Elementary School
- Bangate Elementary School
- Barcelona Central School
- Barcelona Grace Learning Center
- Bugtong Elementary School
- Cagang Elementary School
- Church of the Nazarene
- Fabrica Elementary School
- Layog Elementary School
- Macabari Elementary School
- Mapapac Elementary School
- Olandia Elementary School
- Paghaluban Elementary School
- Putiao Elementary School
- San Antonio Elementary School
- San Isidro Elementary School
- San Ramon Elementary School
- Sta. Cruz Elementary School
- Sta. Lourdes Elementary School
- Tagdon Elementary School
- Luneta Elementary School

=== Secondary schools ===
- Barcelona National Comprehensive High School
- Celso F. Falcotelo National High School
- San Antonio National High School
