= Bulusan (municipality) =

Municipality in Sorsogon, Philippines

- Municipality
- Municipality of Bulusan
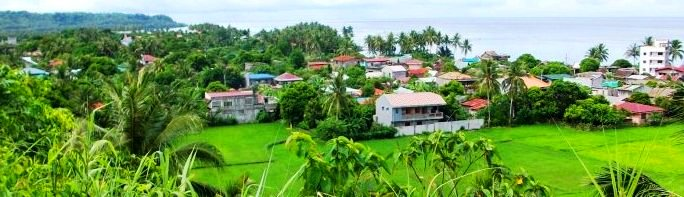
- Aerial view of Bulusan

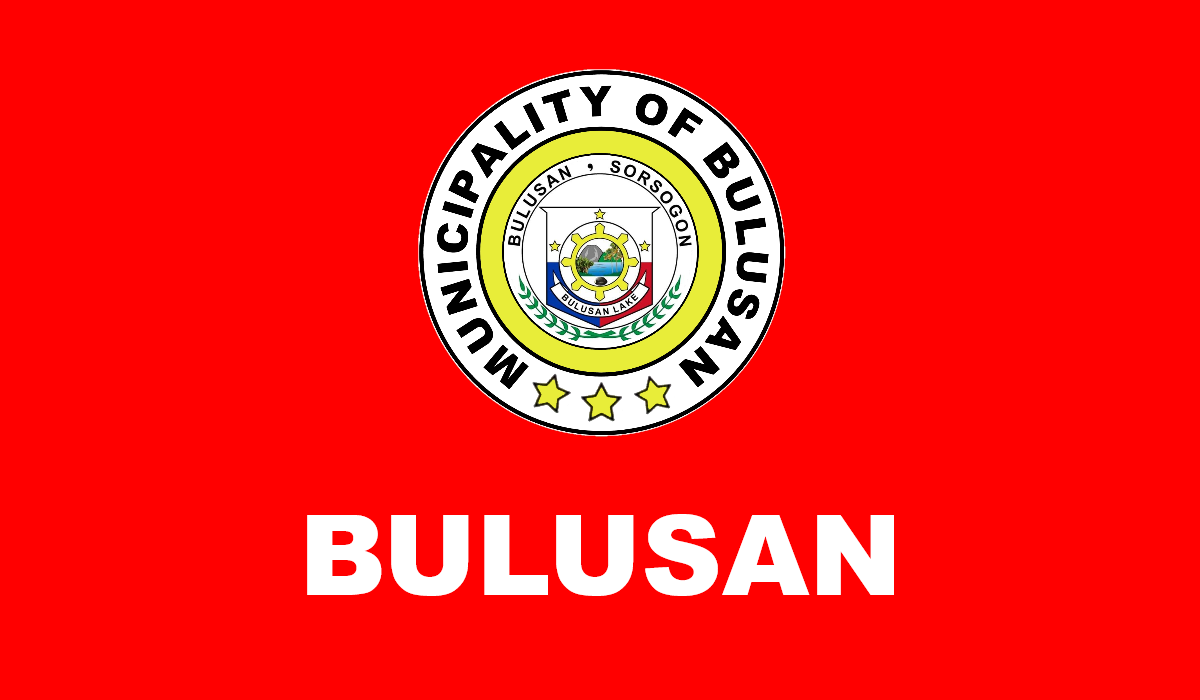
- Flag Seal

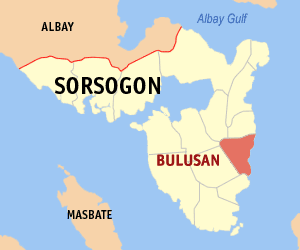
- Map of Sorsogon with Bulusan (municipality) highlighted
- Interactive map of Bulusan
- Location within the Philippines
- Coordinates: 12°45′08″N 124°08′08″E
- Country: Philippines
- Region: Bicol Region
- Province: Sorsogon
- District: 2nd district
- Founded: 1630
- Barangays: 24 (see Barangays)

Government
  - Type: Sangguniang Bayan
  - Mayor: Weng Rafallo Romano
  - Vice Mayor: Michael G. Guysayko
  - Representative: Vacant
  - Municipal Council: Members: Mark J. Dominguez; Celestino F. Frades; Ana Marie N. Gallinera; Lorenzo F. de Castro; Maria Teresa G. Fuasa; Victor F. Espeña Jr.; Catalino F. Sesbreño; Westmoreland G. Ragasa
  - Electorate: 17,695 voters (2025)

Area
  - Total: 96.30 km^{2} (37.18 sq mi)
- Elevation: 108 m (354 ft)
- Highest elevation: 620 m (2,030 ft)
- Lowest elevation: 0 m (0 ft)

Population (2024 census)
  - Total: 24,152
  - Density: 250.8/km^{2} (649.6/sq mi)
  - Households: 5,747

Economy
  - Income class: 3rd municipal income class
  - Poverty incidence: 34.25% (2023)
  - Revenue: ₱ 150.6 million (2024)
  - Assets: ₱ 642 million (2024)
  - Expenditure: ₱ 158 million (2024)
  - Liabilities: ₱ 130.1 million (2024)

Service provider
  - Electricity: Sorsogon 1 Electric Cooperative (SORECO 1)
- Time zone: UTC+8 (PST)
- ZIP code: 4704
- PSGC: 0506204000
- IDD : area code: +63 (0)56
- Native languages: Sorsogon language Tagalog
- Website: www.bulusan.gov.ph

Bulusan, officially the Municipality of Bulusan (Waray Sorsogon: Bungto san Bulusan; Waray: Bungto han Bulusan, Tagalog: Bayan ng Bulusan), is a municipality in the province of Sorsogon, Philippines. According to the 2024 census, it has a population of 24,152 people.

== History ==
=== Pre-Spanish period ===
Long before the Spaniards arrived, the natives of Bulusan were living in organized though scattered settlements. Some lived in what used to be Inarado (now Licod or San Rafael), others in Ilihan, some in Pinayagan, and still a number lived in Capangihan — a place near the Paghasaan and Bayugin Rivers. These settlements are distant from the seacoast and upland. The reason could be the presence of Moro pirates who used to attack the town, especially the coastal areas, robbing the natives of their gold and whatever else came to be lying around, and burning the houses afterwards. Due to these Moro-related disasters, it was a wise move to locate the settlements on higher ground.

Recent excavations yielded artifacts such as platters, jugs, plates, and vases made from china and earthen burial jars in what used to be Inarado. These finds further strengthened some claims that the Chinese and the people in this part of the country were already engaged in trade even before the 'Cross & Sword' reached them.

=== Spanish period ===
==== The town's foundation ====
Bulusan, like the rest of Sorsogon, was part of the province of Albay till October 17, 1894. In Inarado, the fourth parroquia (parish) of the present Province of Sorsogon, was established in 1630. After being merely a part of Casiguran (established in 1600), Bulusan became an independent parish following Bacon (established in 1617) and the parish of Sorsogon (established in 1628). It became a separate pueblo civil (town) in 1631. The new parish was then placed under the tutelary of St. James, the Greater — the patron saint of Spain. Fr. Miguel de Santa Ana became its first parish priest, exercising one-man authority over ecclesiastical and civil functions. The people also selected the first executive of the place, a gobernadorcillo.

In 1760, the town was transferred from Inarado to its present site at the mouth of Bulusan River. This was triggered by the need to trade with neighboring settlements. The relocation was done through the efforts of Fr. Joaquin de los Santos, the parish priest. Under the friar's guidance, the people chose Bernardino Pasion as first head of the town. The natives started building a church in the place where a new one now stands. This initial development formed the nucleus of the present poblacion (town center).

==== Division ====
The Bulusan parish then encompassed all lands that includes the vicinities of Gubat, Matnog, Bulan, Barcelona and Santa Magdalena. Eventually, either new parishes were born out of the mother parish and became a town of its own or these communities grew into separate towns of their own and, in turn, established their own parishes. See table below:

Former Communities of Bulusan
| Name | Year the Parish Was Established | Year founded as a Separate Town |
|---|---|---|
| Gubat | 1771 | 1764 |
| Matnog | 1785 | 1800 |
| Bulan ("Gate" townsite; under Bulusan 1645–1690) | 1801 | 1801 |
| Barcelona (from Bulusan and Gubat) | 1867 | 1886 |
| Irosin | 1873 | 1880 |
| Santa Magdalena (from Bulusan, then under Matnog) | 1890 | 1894 |

==== Stone watchtowers ====
Bulusan's watchtowers are believed to have been built around 1760, the year that the town's poblacion was transferred to its present site. In 1799, as a defense and warning measure against the Moro pirates, the principalias (leaders) of the coastal towns of Albay convened in their respective town halls and drew up plans for the building of lanchas cañoneras (armed ships). On April 20, 1799, Bulusan's leaders decided to build two lanchas cañoneras to be commanded by actual gobernadorcillo Don Juan Macsimiano and ex-gobernadorcillo Don Juan Tomas.

The town of Bulusan built the most baluartes de piedra (stone watchtowers). The town erected watchtowers, one each in Macabare, Tawog and Layog (now a part of Barcelona).

Near the community of Dapdap, a bigger triangular muralla [fortification] called Punta Diamante which encloses the church and rectory of the parish of St. James the Greater was erected. Punta Diamante has five watchtowers with high, thick walls, making it an ideal place for refuge during Moro attacks. Unlike the other watchtowers which are cylindrical and have circular bases, the one facing the sea is of a triangular plan, a smaller version of the main complex. The biggest watchtower has an octagon shaped base (with eight sides) and tapers upward in alternating tiers. This watchtower now serves as the church's bell tower, with the old bells comparably intact.

==== Growth and wealth ====
Among the province's other towns, Bulusan was comparatively well-off. Being a major port of armadillas (small ships) patrolling the high seas — equivalent to present-day Philippine Coast Guard — it was well protected from the Moro pirates. As a consequence, people from other towns came, earned their living, and paid tributes to the Spanish Government. In 1809, when the governor of Albay ordered the construction of a cemetery outside each town, Bulusan reported the highest construction cost (200 pesos) in a display of its considerable wealth.

Spain's control over the Buluseños — the locals of Bulusan — and the rest of the natives throughout the islands brought a significant change in their community life. They were made to embrace Catholic faith more by force than by conviction. Polos y servicios (forced labor) was widely used especially in the building of buildings like churches and rectories with its dungeons, and the casa tribunal (town hall). It could be presumed that a forced labor was likewise employed in the construction of Punta Diamante and the other watchtowers.

=== American period ===
Bulusan had its own share of heroes in the revolution against Spain. These same individuals would later find themselves in the war against the Americans. Colonel Emeterio Funes, a Buluseño, was one of the foremost revolutionary leaders in the province. Coming home from a military service under General Miguel Malvar, he was aware of the immediate plans of the Americans to invade the rest of the country. Upon his arrival in Bulusan, he met with the town's prominent figures, with the parish priest in attendance, in the church rectory. Together, they drew up plans for a revolutionary movement in the province. In 1900, Emeterio Funes was appointed colonel of the revolutionary forces in Sorsogon by General Vito Belarmino of Albay.

The revolutionary forces in the province had been quite a success, what with the natives and the elected officials on their side. On April 25, 1900, the Americans waged a battle with the Filipino revolutionaries in Sitio Boco, San Francisco. The Americans suffered three casualties: one lieutenant was killed, and two soldiers were wounded. Meanwhile, only two soldiers were wounded on the defender's side. Due to lack of ammunition, the revolutionaries were unable to make a second attack and had to flee to safety. The Americans, enraged with the loss of a comrade and the failure to capture Colonel Funes, later on burned the entire town. After two years of effective resistance, on February 21, 1901, Colonel Funes took the oath of allegiance to the United States in a ceremony done in Bulan. Knowing that the inhabitants were getting weary of the war, he decided to end it peacefully.

Under the Americans, the first municipal president was Braulio Ganzo. However, the first local executive elected in Bulusan by popular suffrage was Juan Fortades.

From 1900 to 1940, Bulusan experienced major developments in education, government, communication, agriculture, and public health. From the very start of the American regime, free public instruction commenced. Public schools in almost all barrios were opened. In 1927, the municipal building (now housing the post office, court room, and municipal jail) and public market (undergoing another major renovation — this time a vertical development) were built. In 1930, the provincial road connecting Bulusan to the adjoining towns of Barcelona and Irosin was opened to traffic. Telegraph and mail services began. Qualified voters began enjoying the right to suffrage. A system of municipal government was instituted. Trade and commerce flourished. Development in agricultural methods was initiated. In public health, cholera and smallpox were contained. In 1939, the first municipal waterworks system was constructed.

At about this period, two Buluseños rose to places of prominence. Juan S. Reyes was elected governor of Sorsogon (1929–1931). His younger brother, Dr. Jose S. Reyes, who obtained his doctorate degree from Columbia University, was elected delegate to the 1935 Constitutional Convention. Referred to as a political genius, he contributed immensely in the drafting of the 1935 Constitution. He also became a member of the Philippine Independence Mission and was the Secretary of Education of both the Quirino and Osmeña administrations. In 1945, he became executive secretary to President Sergio Osmeña.

=== World War II ===
This period of relative peace and prosperity in Bulusan was disturbed when the Second World War broke out in the Philippines on December 8, 1941. Like the rest of the islands, Bulusan was overrun by the Japanese Imperial Army. This triggered nationalism once more among Buluseños with the re-emergence of organized guerilla resistance. The Japanese later succeeded in establishing a semblance of local government to administer the town, but the loyalty of those appointed to these positions remained with the resistance group.

== Geography ==
It is bordered by the towns of Barcelona in the north and, going counterclockwise, the towns of Casiguran, Juban, Irosin, and Santa Magdalena. The islets of San Bernardino, about 15 kilometres (9.3 mi) off the coast, fall under the jurisdiction of Bulusan. Bulusan is 55 kilometres (34 mi) from Sorsogon City and 636 kilometres (395 mi) from Manila.

=== Barangays ===
Bulusan is politically subdivided into 24 barangays. Each barangay consists of puroks and some have sitios.

There are 8 barangays located in the Poblacion area.

- Bagacay
- Central (Poblacion)
- Cogon
- Dancalan
- Dapdap (Poblacion)
- Lalud
- Looban (Poblacion)
- Mabuhay (Poblacion)
- Madlawon (Poblacion)
- Poctol (Poblacion)
- Porog
- Sabang (Poblacion)
- Salvacion
- San Antonio
- San Bernardo
- San Francisco (Kapangihan)
- San Isidro
- San Jose
- San Rafael (Likod)
- San Roque
- San Vicente (Buhang)
- Santa Barbara
- Sapngan (Poblacion)
- Tinampo

=== Climate ===
Climate data for Bulusan, Sorsogon
| Month | Jan | Feb | Mar | Apr | May | Jun | Jul | Aug | Sep | Oct | Nov | Dec | Year |
|---|---|---|---|---|---|---|---|---|---|---|---|---|---|
| Mean daily maximum °C (°F) | 27 (81) | 28 (82) | 29 (84) | 30 (86) | 31 (88) | 30 (86) | 29 (84) | 29 (84) | 29 (84) | 29 (84) | 28 (82) | 27 (81) | 29 (84) |
| Mean daily minimum °C (°F) | 21 (70) | 21 (70) | 21 (70) | 22 (72) | 24 (75) | 24 (75) | 24 (75) | 24 (75) | 24 (75) | 24 (75) | 23 (73) | 22 (72) | 23 (73) |
| Average precipitation mm (inches) | 65 (2.6) | 44 (1.7) | 42 (1.7) | 39 (1.5) | 87 (3.4) | 150 (5.9) | 184 (7.2) | 153 (6.0) | 163 (6.4) | 154 (6.1) | 127 (5.0) | 100 (3.9) | 1,308 (51.4) |
| Average rainy days | 13.9 | 9.2 | 11.0 | 12.5 | 19.6 | 24.3 | 26.5 | 25.0 | 25.5 | 24.4 | 19.4 | 15.1 | 226.4 |
Source: Meteoblue

== Demographics ==
Population census of Bulusan, Sorsogon
| Year | Pop. | ±% p.a. |
|---|---|---|
| 1903 | 5,578 | — |
| 1918 | 8,046 | +2.47% |
| 1939 | 10,430 | +1.24% |
| 1948 | 12,144 | +1.70% |
| 1960 | 15,539 | +2.08% |
| 1970 | 16,217 | +0.43% |
| 1975 | 16,393 | +0.22% |
| 1980 | 18,050 | +1.94% |
| 1990 | 18,009 | −0.02% |
| 1995 | 19,501 | +1.50% |
| 2000 | 20,469 | +1.04% |
| 2007 | 21,374 | +0.60% |
| 2010 | 22,089 | +1.20% |
| 2015 | 22,884 | +0.68% |
| 2020 | 23,932 | +0.95% |
| 2024 | 24,152 | +0.22% |
Source: Philippine Statistics Authority

=== Language ===
Bulusan people are speakers of the Bisakol language. Pure Bicol is spoken in some special occasions and in Roman Catholic church liturgies. Tagalog is considered the third language, parallel to English.

=== Religion ===
Roman Catholicism comprises 90% of the population. There are members of Iglesia ni Cristo, Jehova's Witnesses, Church of Jesus of the Latter Day Saints, born-again Christians and other fundamental denominations in the town.

== Economy ==
Poverty incidence of Bulusan (%)

Source: Philippine Statistics Authority

== Tourism ==
=== Mt. Bulusan ===
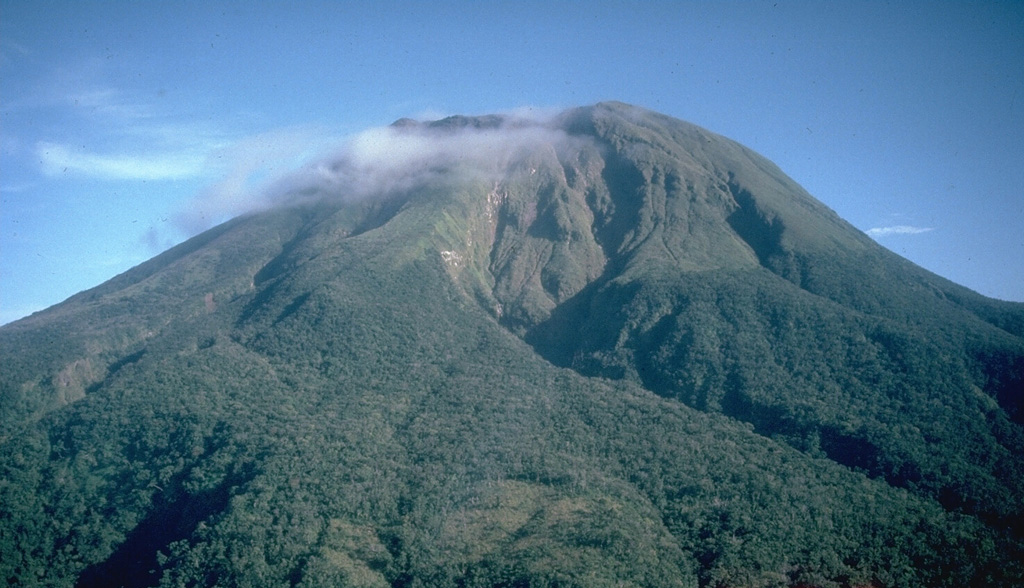
Mt. Bulusan, the centerpiece of Bulusan Volcano Natural Park

Bulusan is home to the highest peak in Sorsogon, Mount Bulusan. This active volcano is the centerpiece of Bulusan Volcano Natural Park which covers a land area of 3,672 hectares. At the foot of the mountain is the equally popular Bulusan Lake, a scenic crater lake surrounded by a dense green forest and encircled by a concrete pathway. The lake is about 30 minute drive through a paved winding road from the Bulusan town proper.

=== Water forms ===
Bulusan, which means "where water flows", is home to several springs and waterfalls that originate from the mountains of the National Park.

- Woods Camp Resort - Named after the founder's surname (Collingwood) it is a cold spring resort between Iraya Spring and Balay Buhay Sa Uma Bee Farm. Its water connects the neighboring Joseph Spring Resort and "Batis" from Balay Buhay. The resort has been opened quite recently and has become one of the most popular tourist spots in Bulusan.
- Masacrot Spring - A man-made earthen swimming pool with cool waters emanating from underground springs.
- Palogtoc Falls (also known as Palogtok Falls). A small waterfall fills this man-made earthen swimming pool which can be reached after a 20-minute leisure walk through rolling hills carpeted with green grass, under a canopy of tall coconut trees.
- Bayugin Falls - Located in Barangay San Francisco in Bulusan and surrounded by a thick forest, the falls is the source of the Bayugin River which eventually joins Paghasaan River as it flows into Bulusan River. It can be reached by a 20-minute tricycle ride from the town of Bulusan to Barangay San Francisco. A 20-minute walk on a mossy and slippery path and then a steep descent to the falls, culminates the hike.
- Dulipay River
- Nasipit Spring - Located in San Rafael.
- Buklad River - Located near San Francisco

=== Historical sites ===
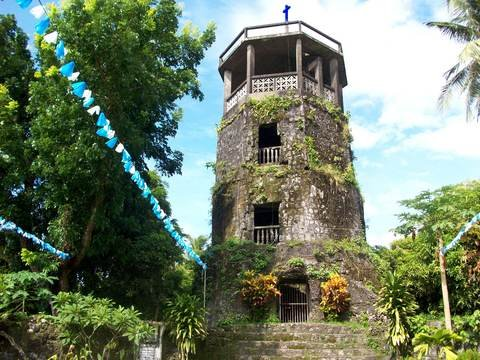
Bulusan Belfry

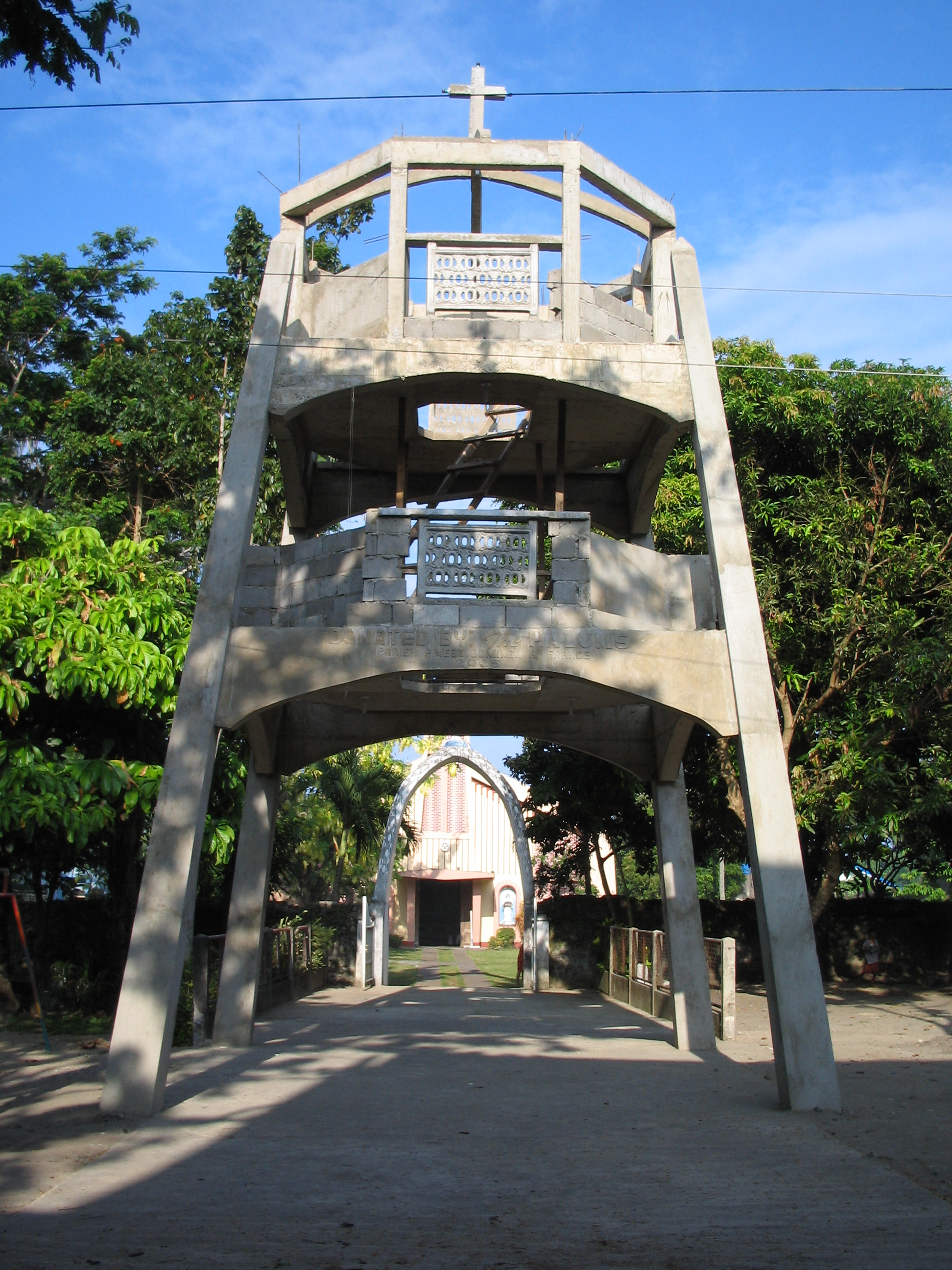
St. James the Greater Parish Church in Bulusan

- Punta Diamante - The muralla (stone fort) that encloses the church complex of St. James the Greater Parish remains grand in its antiquity together with the Bulusan belfry, the largest of the five watchtowers dotting the historical complex.
- Buco Pass

=== Others ===
- Dancalan, Miliga-biga and Riroan beaches are popular swimming spots in Bulusan.
- Tan-awan is a cliff road that overlooks the town of Bulusan, San Bernardino Strait and the expansive Pacific Ocean. From the vantage point, the view stretches from Tawog to the north, to barangay san antonio to the south. Offshore islands like San Bernardino or Parola (because of its lighthouse), Biri and the main island of Samar can be seen on clear days.
- Mapaso, the Healing Hot Spring is at Barangay San Vicente (also known as "Buhang"), Bulusan, Sorsogon. Mapaso is one of the best kept-secrets of Bulusan. Unlike the other springs dotting all over the mountain villages, this one almost touches the sea and is the only one attributed with healing powers.

== Government ==
List of Municipal Mayors
| Name | Year | Term |
|---|---|---|
| Fulgencio Sesbreno | 1926-1934 | ... |
| Leon Galarosa | 1935-1937 | ... |
| Sergio Galao | 1938-1940 | ... |
| Vicente Guysayko | 1938-1940 | Elected |
| Buenaventura Frades | 1948-1951 | Elected |
| Jaime S. Reyes | 1951-1959 | Elected |
| Dr. Rogado Halum | 1960-1963 | Elected |
| Vicente Guysayko | 1967-1969 | Died in office in March 1969 |
| Jaime S. Reyes | 1969-1971 | Succeeded Vicente Guysayko when he died in office |
| Erwin G. Guysayko | 1972-1979 | Term was extended due to imposition of martial law |
| Dr. Rogado Halum | 1979-1985 | Appointed mayor by President Marcos elected in January 1980 |
| Antonio Frades | 1985-1987 | Appointed OIC by President Corazon C. Aquino |
| Nelly G. Fortades | 1987-1992 | First elected lady mayor of Bulusan |
| Dr. Oscar S. Halum | 1992-2001 | Elected; re-elected in 1998 |
| Juan G. Guysayko | 2001-2010 | Elected; re-elected in 2004 |
| Michael G. Guysayko | 2010–2013 | Elected in May 2010 |
| Domingo S. Halum | 2013–2016 | Elected in May 2013 |
| Michael G. Guysayko | 2016–2019 | Elected in May 2016 |

Another Buluseño, Augusto Ortiz, rose to become provincial executive from 1968 to 1971. From the judiciary, he was tapped governor of Sorsogon anew by President Marcos (1977) but had to relinquish the post when he was elected to the Interim Batasang Pambansa in 1978. In 1984, he was elected as Mambabatas Pambansa until 1986 when it was dissolved. During his term, the Bulusan Cultural and Sports Center was constructed in what used to be the site of the old Central School's Gabaldon building. Two municipal streets in Barangay Sabang and Madlawon were likewise constructed.

The '80s also marked the birth of Damayan Buluseño, Inc. (DBI), an organization of Buluseños living in Metro Manila. The group provides assistance to and development opportunities among Buluseños, like employment opportunities, medical assistance for the poor, scholarship, relief and financial assistance for the development of Bulusan. Starting out as a loose group out to muster support for a town mate undergoing trial in Manila but who they believed was wrongly accused, DBI went on to become a duly registered organization which, with its heretofore unseen zeal and popular support, became one of the province's most active organizations under the leadership of its founding president, Rogelio F. Fuentes. To date, it continues to fulfill its vision and provides an avenue for community leadership, pride in the hometown, brotherhood, and prosperity as ideals worthy of pursuit.

== Education ==
The Bulusan Schools District Office governs all educational institutions within the municipality. It oversees the management and operations of all private and public, from primary to secondary schools.

=== Primary and elementary schools ===
Bulusan Central School (founded in 1903) by the American Thomasites, is the town's pilot elementary school. It was first housed in the Gabaldon building (the town's old casa tribunal). When the enrollment steadily increased through the years, several private houses were used as annexes, until the school was eventually transferred to a spacious property in Barangay Poctol, also in the poblacion, where Emeterio Funes Street now runs. The Gabaldon building itself (or at least the upper storey) was totaled by Typhoon Dinang in December 1981. Assemblyman Augusto Ortiz had the old stone walls demolished and built Bulusan Cultural and Sports Center on the vacated lot.

- Bagacay Elementary School
- Buhang Elementary School
- Capiricohan Community School
- Cogon Elementary School
- Dancalan Elementary School
- Immaculate Heart of Mary School
- Lalud Elementary School
- Porog Elementary School
- Sabang Elementary School
- Salvacion Elementary School
- San Antonio Elementary School
- San Bernardo Elementary School
- San Francisco Elementary School
- San Isidro Elementary School
- San Jose (Lower) Elementary School
- San Jose (Upper) Elementary School
- San Rafael Elementary School
- San Roque Elementary School
- Santa Barbara Elementary School
- Tinampo Elementary School

=== Secondary schools ===
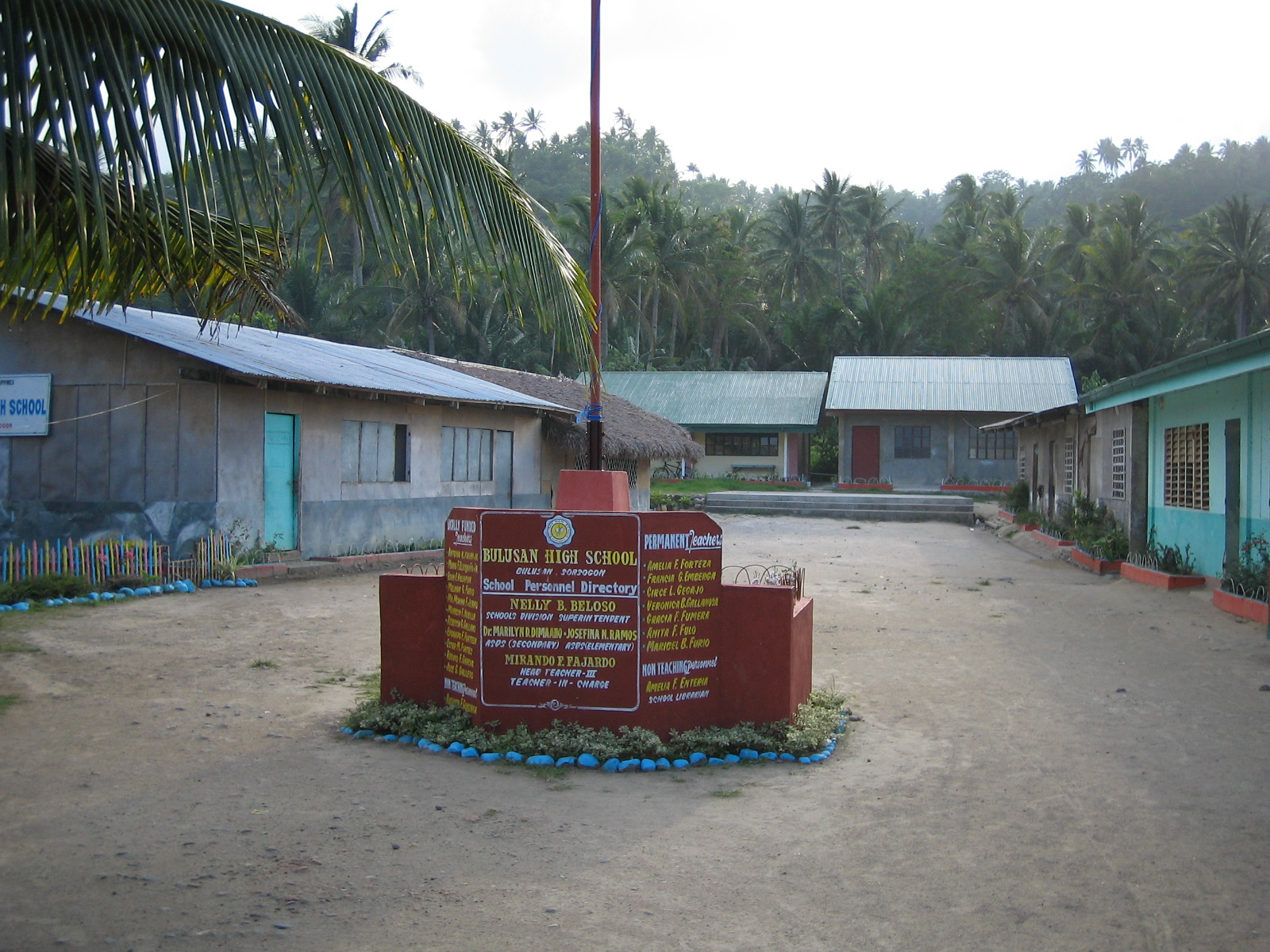
Bulusan High School

- Aaron James Guysayko Memorial Foundation is the town's pioneering secondary school. It was founded as Bulusan Institute in 1950 by Dr. Jose S. Reyes. All secondary schools in the country, were, at around that time, private. The school was renamed Jose S. Reyes Memorial Institute in the 1970s and became a foundation at the advent of the new millennium.
- Bulusan High School is a public high school in the vicinity of Bulusan Poblacion, founded October 4, 2000, at the boundary of Madlawon and Dancalan. After two years of operation, the High School department of Bulusan National Vocational Technical School was turned over to the school.
- Immaculate Heart of Mary School (IHMS) - Bulusan, on the other side of Punta Diamante, is a Franciscan-operated elementary and secondary school.
- Jaime G. Espeña High School is a nationalized high school founded as Buhang High School integrated to the elementary school of Buhang, Bulusan, Sorsogon. The school was relocated in sitio Taizan when the Espeña family donated a parcel of land. It was later named after their late father, Dr. Jaime G. Espeña.
- San Roque National High School is another nationalized high school in the southwestern part of Bulusan near the boundary of Irosin. It is fed by neighboring villages' elementary schools including some parts of Irosin such as Mapaso Patag and Cauayan.

=== Vocational and technical schools ===
- Bulusan National Vocational Technical School is one of the country's top performing TESDA schools. It started out as a municipal high school founded by Jose Geñorga, who was TESDA Vocational School Administrator II (VSA II) when he retired. The school now caters to students from the 2nd District of Sorsogon.
