= Bulusan National Vocational Technical School =

Coordinates: 12.75338°N 124.13262°E

Location
- San Jose, Bulusan; Sorsogon, Bicol Region; Philippines

Information
- Established: 1995
- Status: Public
- Enrollment: approx. 2,000
- Language: English, Filipino
- Colors: Blue and White
- Nickname: BNVTS (local)
- Affiliations: TESDA Department of Labor and Employment

Bulusan National Vocational Technical School (also known as Voc-Tec) is a public vocational and technical school at the entrance of San Jose, Bulusan, Sorsogon. It was founded through the effort of the local government and the first administrator, Jose Geñorga, TESDA Vocational School Administrator II (VSA II), approved 1995 by the Philippine Congress. At present, it is run by Technical Education and Skills Development Authority (TESDA) of Department of Labor and Employment.

It was approved under Republic Act No. 8073: An act establishing a National Vocational-Technical School in the Municipality of Bulusan.

== History ==
Initially, the school was organized as a public vocational secondary school under the National Secondary School Curriculum of the Department of Education. The students admitted were graduates of elementary grades to pursue high school studies with their preferred vocational courses as part of the curriculum. Parents, community, teachers, and public officials cooperated to make school buildings from light materials.

The staff then was composed of teachers mostly deployed from San Roque High School of Bulusan, Sorsogon and some through direct hiring.

=== TESDA administration ===
In 2002, the management of the school was turned over to the Technical Education and Skills Development Authority from the Department of Education to be able to concentrate on the core subjects in vocational-technical aspects, creating tertiary curriculum and abstracting the secondary level. High school students were turned over to Bulusan High School to give way to the surge of enrollment from different municipalities.

== Courses offered ==
Courses offered are mostly integrated with the main core subjects in technology and home economics in Philippine public schools with an approach and intensive orientation to make graduates.

The school offers a variety of employable courses. The target is to find partners for on-the-job training and be hired upon completing requirements. The following are the courses readily available:

- Computer Programming and Technology
- Agriculture
- Food Trade/Culinary
- Animal Production
- Automotive
- Horticulture
- Food Processing
- Waiter Training
- HRM associate
- Comprehensive Commercial Baking
- Tailoring/garments
- Others

== Curriculum ==
The school is under the competency standard development of TESDA. The competency standards and qualifications, together with training standards and assessment arrangements comprise the national training regulations promulgated by the agency.
