= Bato, Camarines Sur =

Municipality in Camarines Sur, Philippines

Bato
- Municipality
- Municipality of Bato
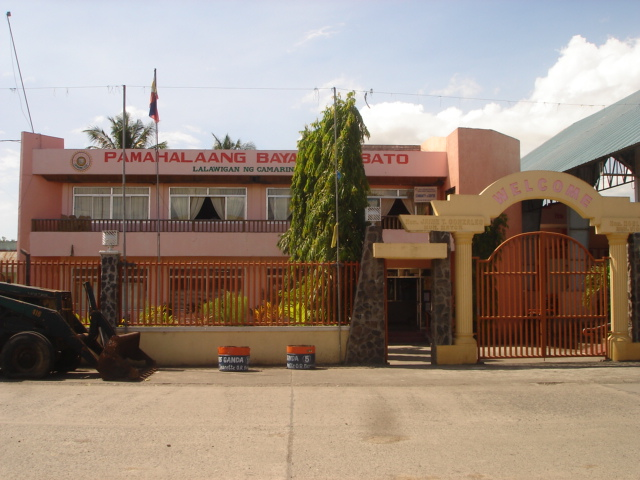
- Municipal Hall

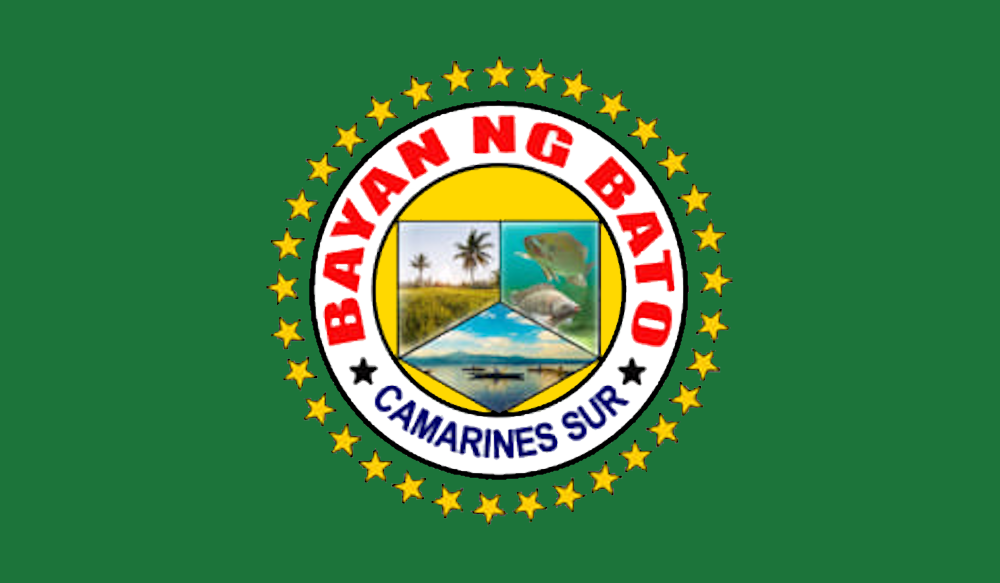
- Flag Seal
- Anthem: Bato, Banwaan na Ginikanan
- Map of Camarines Sur with Bato highlighted
- Interactive map of Bato
- Location within the Philippines
- Coordinates: 13°21′28″N 123°22′04″E
- Country: Philippines
- Region: Bicol Region
- Province: Camarines Sur
- District: 5th district
- Barangays: 33 (see Barangays)

Government
  - Type: Sangguniang Bayan
  - Mayor: Enric L. Dancalan
  - Vice Mayor: Diosdado T. Zorilla
  - Representative: Miguel Luis R. Villafuerte
  - Municipal Council: Members: John Mark T. Zorilla; Martin G. Batacan; Dominici G. Batacan; Adolfo A. Ramos; Eliseo T. Priela; Jhonel Ll. De Lima; Noel C. Tino; Noel C. Tuyay
  - Electorate: 34,609 voters (2025)

Area
  - Total: 107.12 km^{2} (41.36 sq mi)
- Elevation: 13 m (43 ft)
- Highest elevation: 59 m (194 ft)
- Lowest elevation: 4 m (13 ft)

Population (2024 census)
  - Total: 52,021
  - Density: 485.63/km^{2} (1,257.8/sq mi)
  - Households: 10,782

Economy
  - Income class: 2nd municipal income class
  - Poverty incidence: 28.57% (2023)
  - Revenue: ₱ 209.1 million (2024)
  - Assets: ₱ 676.5 million (2024)
  - Expenditure: ₱ 203.2 million (2024)
  - Liabilities: ₱ 302.9 million (2024)

Service provider
  - Electricity: Camarines Sur 3 Electric Cooperative (CASURECO 3)
- Time zone: UTC+8 (PST)
- ZIP code: 4435
- PSGC: 0501703000
- IDD : area code: +63 (0)54
- Native languages: Rinconada Bikol; Central Bikol; Tagalog

Bato, officially the Municipality of Bato (Rinconada Bikol: Banwāan ka Bato; Tagalog: Bayan ng Bato), is a municipality in the province of Camarines Sur, Philippines. According to the 2024 census, it has a population of 52,021 people.

The municipality of Bato is home to a lake teeming with various kinds of fishes. Sinarapan, the world's smallest commercially harvested fish, occupies the waters of Lake Bato. Also present, the lake abounds with tilapia housed in fish cages.

== History ==
This town was formerly called as "Kaliligno" or "Caliligno" named by the natives that settled along the river area.

This small village later was elevated into a status of a town under the decree of Spanish Superior Government on February 15, 1753. Years back, a parish was already existing which was also made under the same decree. This parish adopted "The Most Holy Trinity" as its patron saint. Its feast day is celebrated every Sunday after the Pentecost. The Bato is also known for its best noodles called Pansit Bato.

== Geography ==
Bato is 26 kilometres (16 mi) from the capital town of Pili and 476 kilometres (296 mi) from the country's capital city of Manila.

=== Barangays ===
Bato is politically subdivided into 33 barangays. Each barangay consists of puroks and some have sitios.

- Agos (Poblacion)
- Bacolod
- Buluang
- Caricot
- Cawacagan
- Cotmon
- Cristo Rey
- Del Rosario
- Divina Pastora (Poblacion)
- Goyudan
- Lobong
- Lubigan
- Mainit
- Manga (Mangga)
- Masoli (Poblacion)
- Neighborhood
- Niño Jesus (Poblacion)
- Pagatpatan
- Palo
- Payak
- Sagrada (Sagrada Familia)
- Salvacion
- San Isidro
- San Juan
- San Miguel (Poblacion)
- San Rafael (Poblacion)
- San Roque
- San Vicente (Poblacion)
- Santa Cruz (Poblacion)
- Santiago (Poblacion)
- Sooc
- Tagpolo
- Tres Reyes (Poblacion)

=== Climate ===
Climate data for Bato, Camarines Sur
Month	Jan	Feb	Mar	Apr	May	Jun	Jul	Aug	Sep	Oct	Nov	Dec	Year
Mean daily maximum °C (°F)	33 (91)	32 (90)	35 (95)	37 (99)	37 (99)	36 (97)	35 (95)	33 (91)	35 (95)	34 (93)	33 (91)	32 (90)	34 (94)
Mean daily minimum °C (°F)	26 (79)	26 (79)	28 (82)	30 (86)	31 (88)	31 (88)	29 (84)	28 (82)	29 (84)	28 (82)	28 (82)	27 (81)	28 (83)
Average precipitation mm (inches)	51.03 (2.01)	78.13 (3.08)	55.3 (2.18)	83.07 (3.27)	159.34 (6.27)	239.88 (9.44)	385.8 (15.19)	391.75 (15.42)	293.65 (11.56)	401.33 (15.80)	108.2 (4.26)	334.9 (13.19)	2,582.38 (101.67)
Average rainy days	21	24	19	20	25	29	31	29	29	29	27	30	313
Source: World Weather Online

== Demographics ==
Population census of Bato

Year	Pop.	±% p.a.
1903	5,111	—
1918	6,044	+1.12%
1939	11,537	+3.13%
1948	14,816	+2.82%
1960	21,078	+2.98%
1970	25,985	+2.11%
1975	28,492	+1.86%
1980	29,774	+0.88%

Year	Pop.	±% p.a.
1990	35,294	+1.72%
1995	38,771	+1.78%
2000	42,739	+2.11%
2007	44,437	+0.54%
2010	48,306	+3.08%
2015	52,137	+1.46%
2020	52,155	+0.01%
2024	52,021	−0.06%

Source: Philippine Statistics Authority

In the 2024 census, the population of Bato was 52,021 people, with a density of 490 inhabitants per square kilometre or 1,300 inhabitants per square mile.

Only about 58.27% of the household population is considered as literate.

Mother tongue of the majority is Riŋkonāda also known as Bikol Rinconada, one of the languages of Bicol region. The population speaks a different form of Rinconada Bikol called Bato variant, a lowland dialect (sinaranəw). Natives are also conversant with Coastal Bikol, Filipino/Tagalog and English languages.

=== Religion ===
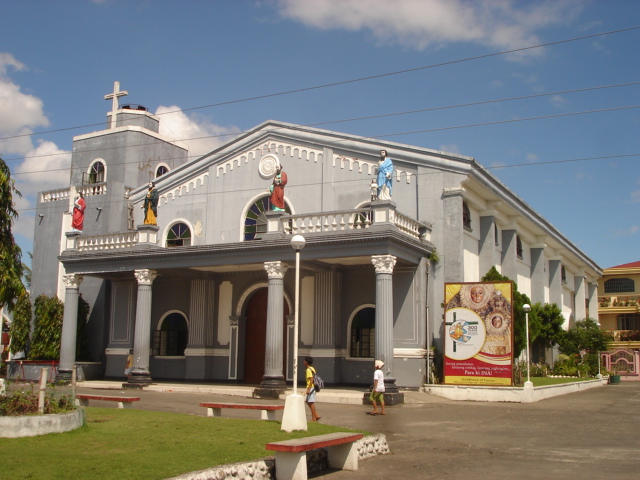
Bato Catholic Church

- Roman Catholicism is the predominant religion, followed by the Iglesia ni Cristo as the largest minority.
- Other religious denominations include Church of Jesus Christ of Latter Day Saints; United Churches of Christ in the Philippines Seventh Day Adventist; Bible Baptist; Born Again; Jehovah's Witnesses; Protestants; Aglipay and Islam.
- There are three (3) Catholic Churches in Bato.

== Economy ==
Poverty incidence of Bato

Source: Philippine Statistics Authority

Majority of employment is within agriculture, fishery, poultry and construction industry groups.

Commerce and industry

- 96 commercial establishments engaged in retail trade
- 46 commercial establishments engaged in services
- 1 commercial establishment engaged in real estate - MTBK Co.
- 1 engaged in banking and finance
- 31 industrial establishments
- 2 Hotels - Casa de Piedra and MTBK Hotel

Natural resources include clams, pearls, local shrimps, tabios, and tilapia, particularly within Lake Bato; forest products such as anahaw leaves and local bamboo; non-metallic mineral resources such as white clay among others.

Agriculture Sector

- 78.087 square kilometers of Agricultural Lands devoted to crop production
- Rice, corn, coconut, root crops, vegetables, and fruit-bearing trees.
- Numerous farm and poultry products found

== Local government ==
The list of the incumbent and former officials of the Municipality of Bato is the following:

2025-Present

- Mayor: Enric L. Dancalan
- Vice-Mayor: Diosdado T. Zorilla
- Councilors:
  - John Mark T. Zorilla
  - Martin G. Batacan
  - Dominici G. Batacan
  - Adolfo A. Ramos
  - Eliseo T. Priela
  - Jhonel Ll. De Lima
  - Noel C. Tino
  - Noel C. Tuyay

2022–2025

- Mayor: Domingo L. Zorilla Jr
- Vice-Mayor: Victorio S. Ramos
- Councilors:
  - Josebello Buquid
  - Diosdado T. Zorilla
  - Martin G. Batacan
  - Noel C. Tino
  - Alvin O. Sacueza
  - Adolfo A. Ramos Jr.
  - Noel C. Tuyay
  - Erwin Nestor O. Rempola Jr.

2019-2022:

- Mayor: Hon. Francisco B. Bernaldez
- Vice-Mayor: Hon. Domingo L. Zorilla Jr.
- Councilors:
  - Diosdado T. Zorilla
  - Dominici G. Batacan
  - Elizabeth Doctolero
  - Ignacio L. Hugo
  - Jose Samar
  - Ban-Ban Aguila
  - Matilde Sandrino
  - Noel C. Tino

2016-2019:

- Mayor: Hon. Francisco B. Bernaldez
- Vice-Mayor: Hon. Victorio S. Ramos
- Councilors:
  - Diosdado T. Zorila
  - Domingo L. Zorilla Jr.
  - Martin G. Batacan
  - Darwin Doctolero
  - Edgar R. Argarin
  - Nestor A. Orasa
  - Danilo S. Mata
  - Ignacio L.Hugo

=== List of former Municipal Mayors ===
Municipal Mayors of Bato, Camarines Sur
No.	Portrait	Name	Term	Place of Origin	Note(s)
1.		Don Elicario Guanzon	1859	Bato, Camarines Sur	
2.		Don Paulino Vasquez Calleja	1860	Bato, Camarines Sur	
3.		Don Luis Delos Santos	1861	Bato, Camarines Sur	
4.		Don Ubaldo Sanis Serano	1862	Libon, Albay	
5.		Don Pedro Tigue	1863-1864	Bato, Camarines Sur	
6.		Don Anselmo Talagtag	1865-1866	Bato, Camarines Sur	
7.		Don Francisco Peña	1867-1868	Bato, Camarines Sur	
8.		Don Domingo Coralde	1869-1870	Bato, Camarines Sur	
9.		Don Gaspar Vasquez Calleja	1871-1872	Bato, Camarines Sur	
10.		Don Jose Regaspi	1873-1874	Bato, Camarines Sur	
11.		Don Pedro Guanzon	1875-1876	Bato, Camarines Sur	
12.		Don Espiritu Candola Cariño	1876	Bato, Camarines Sur	
13.		Don Silvestre Isaac	1877-1878	Bato, Camarines Sur	
(9)		Don Gaspar Vasquez Calleja	1879-1880	Bato, Camarines Sur	
14.		Don Toribio Dakpano Coralde	1881-1882	Bato, Camarines Sur	
15.		Don Froilán Villanueva	1883-1884	Polangui, Albay	
16.		Don Timoteo Isaac	1885-1886	Bato, Camarines Sur	
(9)		Don Gaspar Vasquez Calleja	1887-1888	Bato, Camarines Sur	
17.		Don Pablo Domamay	1889-1893	Bato, Camarines Sur	
(9)		Don Gaspar Vasquez Calleja	1894	Bato, Camarines Sur	
18.		Don Tomás Doroin Barrameda	1895-1898	Baao, Camarines Sur	
(17)		Don Pablo Domamay	1899-1900	Bato, Camarines Sur	
(9)		Don Gaspar Vasquez Calleja	1901	Bato, Camarines Sur	
19.		Don Moises Calleja Sayson	1902-1903	Bato, Camarines Sur	
20.		Don Gregorio Orasa Isaac	1904-1905	Bato, Camarines Sur	
21.		Don Eliseo Calleja	1906-1907	Bato, Camarines Sur	
22.		Don Agrifino Villoso Varde	1908-1912	Bato, Camarines Sur	
23.		Don Roman Repaso	1913-1916	Bato, Camarines Sur	
24.		Don Cecilio Buquid Coralde	1917-1919	Bato, Camarines Sur	
25.		Don Vidal Serantes Elpedes	1920-1922	Bato, Camarines Sur	
26.		Don Eusebio Potian Buena	1923-1925	Bato, Camarines Sur	
29.		Don Felix Morata Grageda	1926-1928	Camalig, Albay	
30.		Don Mariano Talagtag Sesno	1929-1931	Bato, Camarines Sur	
31.		Don Juan Sayson Belleza	1932-1934	Bato, Camarines Sur	
32.		Don Eulogio Intia Buquid	1935-1937	Bato, Camarines Sur	
(31)		Don Juan Sayson Belleza	1938-1940	Bato, Camarines Sur	
33.		Don Pio Bartilet Mota	1941-1943	Bato, Camarines Sur	
34.		Don Domingo Bontit Fortuno	1944	Bato, Camarines Sur	
(33)		Don Pio Bartilet Mota	1945	Bato, Camarines Sur	
(32)		Don Eulogio Intia Buquid	1946-1947	Bato, Camarines Sur	
35.		Mateo Tanay Ramos	1948-1951	Bato, Camarines Sur	
36.		Abundio Timbang Intia	1952-1955	Bato, Camarines Sur	
(33)		Don Pio Bartilet Mota	1956-1959	Bato, Camarines Sur	
37.		Jorge Regaspi Tuyay	1960-1967	Bato, Camarines Sur	Ret. US Navy Veteran
38.		Atty. Ernesto Sabile Tino	1968-1971	Bato, Camarines Sur	First Lawyer-Mayor of Bato
39.		Nahil Yared Buquid	1972-1986	Cebu City, Cebu	First Female Mayor of Bato
40.		Narciso Romaraog Doctolero. Jr.	1986-1992	Bato, Camarines Sur	
41.		Tito Mota Pili	1992-1998	Bato, Camarines Sur	
42.		Jaime Timbang Gonzales	1998-2007	Bato, Camarines Sur	Ret. PAF 2nd. Lt.
43.		Jeanette Osea Ramos Bernaldez	2007-2016	Bato, Camarines Sur	
44.		Francisco Buena Bernaldez	2016-2022	Bato, Camarines Sur	First Engineer-Mayor of Bato
45.		Domingo Landagan Zorilla, Jr.	2022-2025	Bato, Camarines Sur	
46.		Enric Lanuzga Dancalan	2025-Present	Bato, Camarines Sur	First Nurse-Midwife Mayor of Bato

== Tourism ==
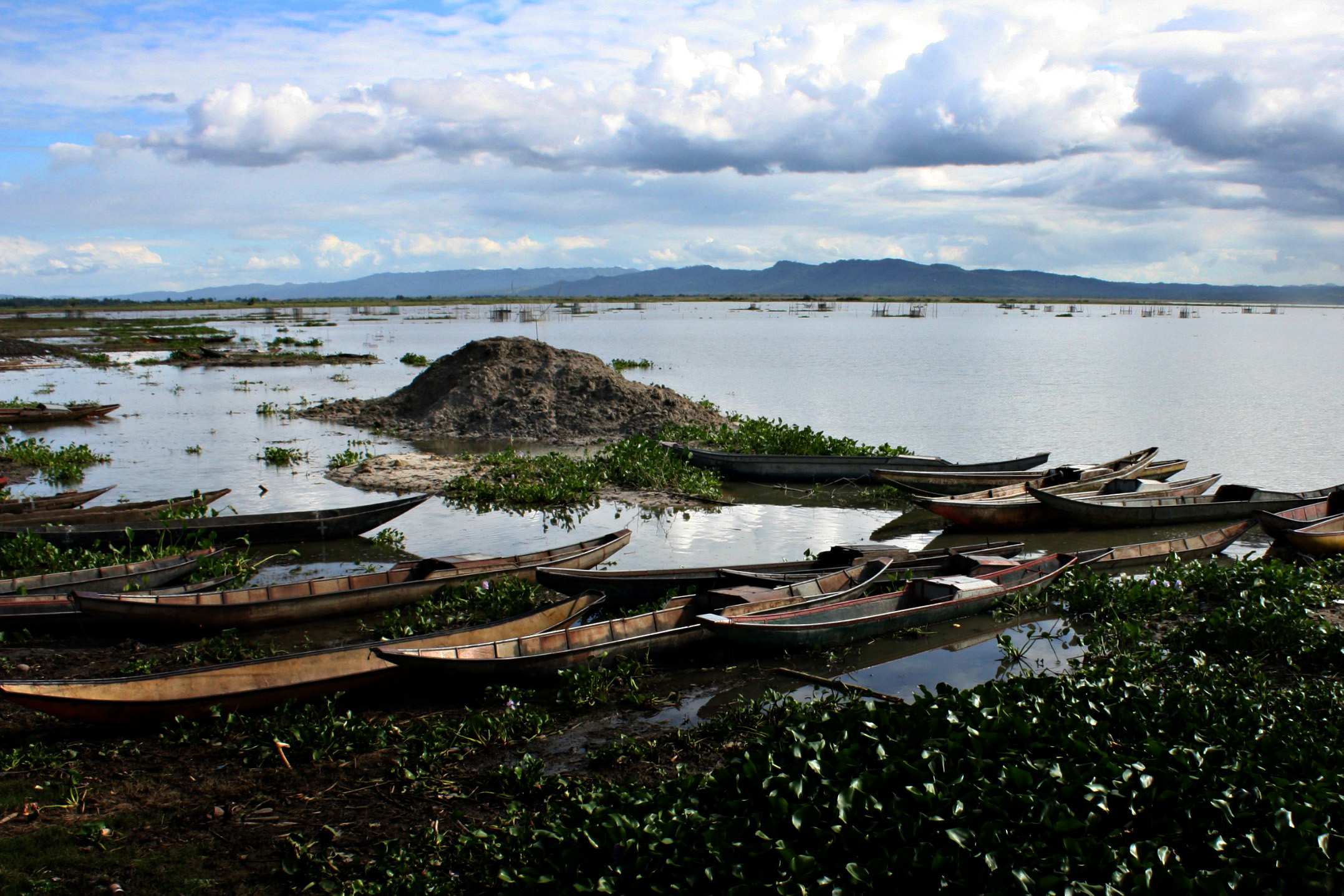
Lake Bato is the largest lake in the Region

- Cotmon Falls
- Arbin Beach Resort
- Lake Bato
- Most Holy Trinity Parish Church
- Maruma Beach
- Bato Boulevard

== Infrastructure ==
=== Health ===
- Municipal Health Center and Barangay Health Stations total bed capacity: Eight (8) beds
- Health personnel numbers only about seventeen (17)

=== Security ===
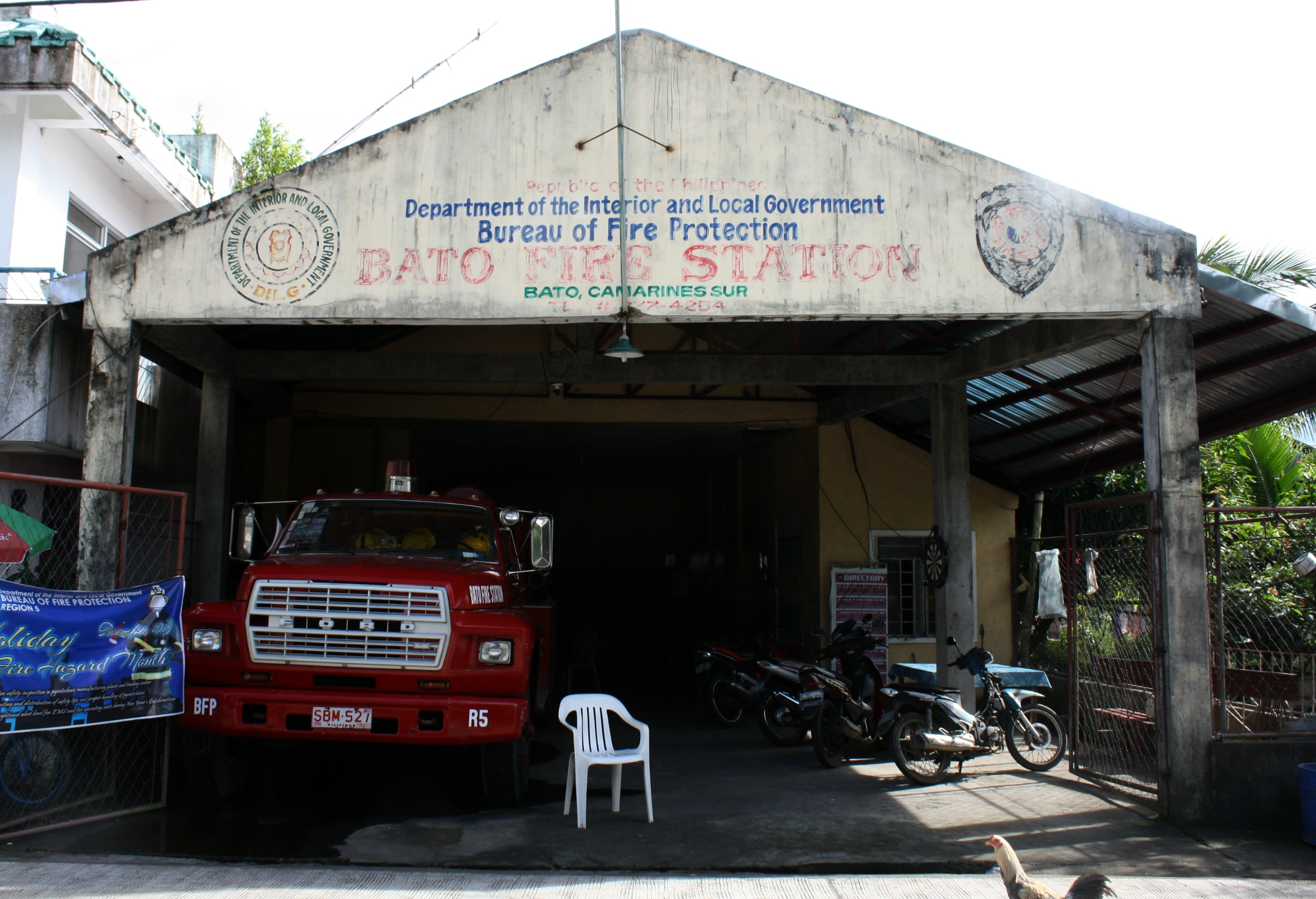
Bato Fire Station

Facilities for police protection include Police Station Headquarters near the Municipal Hall in the Poblacion, Police Substation in Barangay Tres Reyes, Police Outpost in Barangay San Miguel. The bureau of Fire Protection of Bato has about eleven (11) firemen personnel.

=== Transportation ===
- 19.550 kilometres (12.148 mi) of National Roads
- 45.650 kilometres (28.366 mi) of Provincial Road
- 7.206 kilometres (4.478 mi) of municipal roads
- 38.683 kilometres (24.037 mi) of Barangays Roads
- six (6) bridges
- 235 privately owned vehicles
- public utility vehicles and government vehicles

=== Utilities ===
Water supply is provided on 3 levels:

- Level I: wells, springs, or water peddlers common in rural barangays and households
- Level II: communal faucet system
- Level III: Bato Water District provides Level III Water Supply Service generally within the poblacion only

Power and electricity:

- Camarines Sur Electric Cooperative (CASURECO) which provides retails electrical supply to the municipality and maintains a substation
- Domestic Consumptions
- 95.18% with total average consumption rate of 35,595.40 KWH/month Industrial and Commercial Consumption have only about 0.48% connections
- Public buildings, streetlights and other account for the remaining 1.72% number of consumption

Communication facilities include telephone/cellular services, postal services, telegraph services, cable television services, and print and broadcast media services.

== Education ==
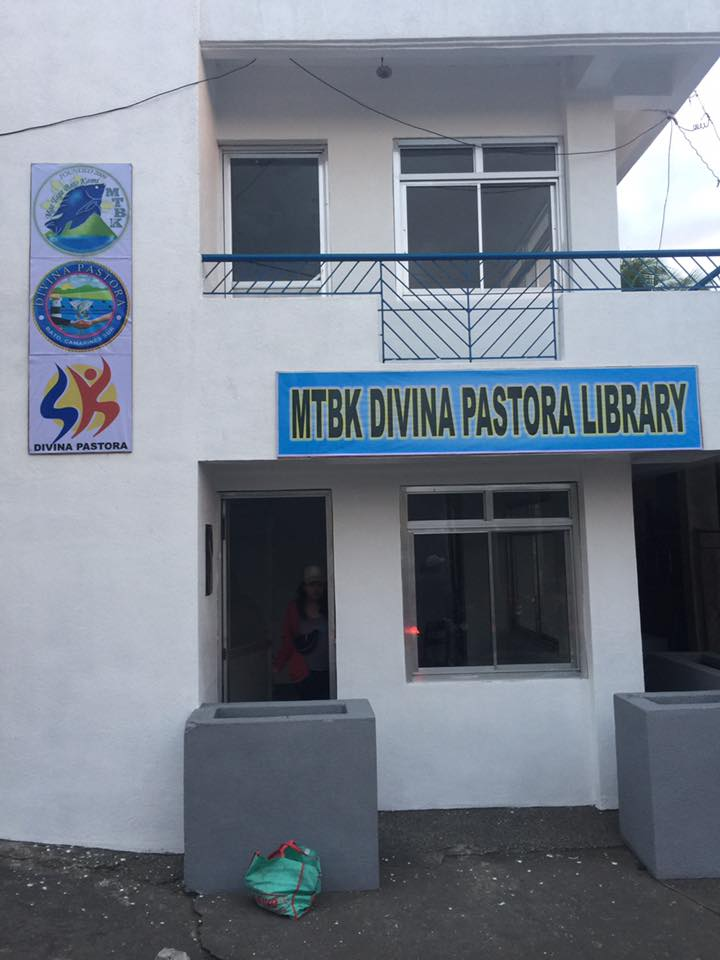
MTBK Divina Pastora Library

The Bato Schools District Office governs all educational institutions within the municipality. It oversees the management and operations of all private and public, from primary to secondary schools.

A public library is located in Brgy. Divisna Pastora which is MTBK Divina Pastora Library

=== Primary and elementary schools ===
- Agos Elementary School
- Antipolo Elementary School
- Bato North Central School
- Bato South Central School
- Buluang Elementary School
- Carlos Nardo Elementary School
- Cristo Rey Elementary School
- Dr. Heracleo Guballo Elementary School
- Manga Elementary School
- Modern Learning Center
- Nino Jesus Elementary School
- Palo Elementary School
- Masoli Elementary School
- Sagrada Elementary School
- Salvacion Elementary School
- San Roque Elementary School
- San Miguel Elementary School
- San Vicente Elementary School
- Tagpolo Elementary School
- Taburnal Learning Center
- Verbum Dei School

=== Secondary schools ===
- Bato National Highschool
- Masoli High School
- Mataas na Paaralan ng Pagatpatan
- Payak High School
- Salvacion National High School
- San Roque National High School

=== Higher educational institutions ===
- Holy Trinity College
- Ocampo Academy Technological Institute
- Saint John the Baptist Institute

== Notable personalities ==
- Maria Venus Raj (b. 1988), Binibining Pilipinas-Universe 2010 and placed 4th Runner-Up in Miss Universe 2010 pageant.
- Jun Jun Zorilla - Former Mayor of Bato
- Froilan Canlas - 2nd Placed in Tawag ng Tanghalan Season 1
- Julian Alturas - Star Magic artist and co-managed by Rise Artist Studio
- Aristeo Solares - Cellist for the Manila Symphony Orchestra
