= Bicol University =

Public university in Albay, Philippines

- Pamantasan ng Bikol (Filipino)
- Other name: BU
- Motto: Scholarship, Leadership, Character, and Service
- Type: State university
- Established: June 21, 1969 (57 years and 124 days)
- Academic affiliations: ASAIHL; AUAP; PASUC; AACCUP
- Endowment: ₱ 569,596,000 ($ 12,828,902) (2014)
- Budget: ₱2.5 billion ($56,307,025) (2014)
- Chairperson: Ricmar P. Aquino
- President: Baby Boy Benjamin D. Nebres III
- Vice-president: Cyrus A. Barrameda (VP for administration & finance); Ma. Julieta B. Borres (VP for academic affairs); Sonnie A. Ramos (VP for planning & development); Lany L. Maceda (VP for research, development and extension)
- Students: 26,346 (2023)
- Location: Legazpi, Albay, Philippines; 13°08′39″N 123°43′26″E
- Campus: Main Legazpi Satellite Daraga, Polangui, Gubat, Ligao, Guinobatan, and Tabaco
- Alma Mater song: Bicol University Hymn
- Newspaper: The Bicol Universitarian
- Colors: Aqua Blue -- Orange -- Grey
- Sporting affiliations: SCUAA
- Website: www.bicol-u.edu.ph
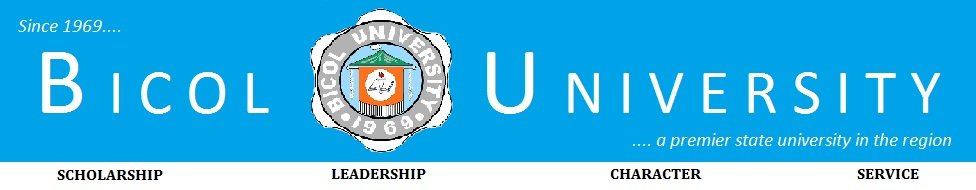

- Location in Albay Location in Luzon Location in the Philippines

Bicol University (Filipino: Pamantasan ng Bikol; BU or Bicol U) is a state university in Legazpi, Albay, Philippines. It has campuses in Daraga, Guinobatan, Polangui, and Tabaco in Albay, and Gubat in Sorsogon.

== History ==
Bicol University was founded on June 21, 1969, by virtue of Republic Act 5521 and was formally organized on September 22, 1970. It evolved out of six educational institutions integrated to form the first state university in the Bicol Region (Region V):

- Bicol Teachers College (BTC) with its Laboratory School in Daraga, Albay, now the BU College of Education (BUCE) with its Integrated Laboratory School (ILS)
- Daraga East Central School (DECS) also in Daraga, Albay, initially renamed as Bicol University Pilot Elementary School (BUPES), now integrated with the BUCE-ILS as its Elementary Department
- Albay High School in Legazpi, now the BUCE-ILS High School Department
- Bicol Regional School for Arts and Trades (BRSAT) in Legazpi, converted from the Albay Trade School by virtue of Republic Act 1129 on June 16, 1954, now the College of Industrial Technology and the College of Engineering.
- Roxas Memorial Agricultural School (RMAS) in Guinobatan, Albay, which became the College of Agriculture, now renamed as the College of Agriculture and Forestry.
- School of Fisheries in Tabaco, Albay, turned into the College of Fisheries, now the Bicol University Tabaco Campus.

These public schools and colleges, now part of Bicol University, had served the people of the region for more than half a century prior to their forming Bicol University.

== Organization and administration ==
The governance of the university is vested in the Board of Regents, abbreviated as BOR. The board, with its 12 members, is the highest decision-making body of the university.

The chairperson or its designated commissioner of the Commission on Higher Education (CHED) serves as the board's chairperson while the president of the Bicol University is the vice-chairperson. The chairpersons of the Committees of Higher Education of the Senate and the House of Representatives are also members of the Board of Regents which are concurrent with their functions as committee chairpersons.

The students of the Bicol University are represented by a student regent, who is also the chair of the University Student Council. The faculty regent is nominated by the faculty members of the whole university. Alumni are represented by the president of the BU Alumni Association.

As of November 2025, the members of the Board of Regents are:

	Member, Board of Regents	
Chairperson-designate	Ricmar P. Aquino, PhD	Commissioner of the Commission on Higher Education
Vice-chairperson	Baby Boy Benjamin D. Nebres III, LPT, EdD	SUC President IV, Bicol University
Member	Hon. Lorna Regina B. Legarda	Chairperson, Senate Committee on Higher, Technical, and Vocational Education
Represented by:	Hon. Cielo Krisel B. Lagman	District Representative, Albay–1st
Member	Hon. Jude A. Acidre	Chairperson, House Committee on Higher and Technical Education Partylist Representative, Tingog Sinirangan Party-List
Represented by:	Hon. Alfredo A. Garbin, Jr.	Partylist Representative, Ako Bicol
Member	Dir. Rommel R. Serrano	Regional Director, DOST Region V
Member	Dir. Rodel P. Tornilla	Regional Executive Director, Department of Agriculture Region V
Member	Dir. Edna Cynthia S. Berces	Regional Director, Department of Economy, Planning, and Development Region V
Member	Ar. Ranulfo S. Imperial	Private Sector Representative
Member	Mr. Denley Cyder A. Mirabueno	Private Sector Representative
Member	Prof. Indira B. Tabo	Faculty Regent and President, BU Union of Faculty Association Inc.
Member	Mr. Kyle Reuben O. Bron	Student Regent and Chairperson, Bicol University Student Council
Member	Alex B. Nepomuceno	Alumni Regent and President, BU General Alumni Association, Inc.

Presidents of
Bicol University
Ricardo A. Arcilla (1969–1980)
Aquilino P. Bonto (1980–1988)
Patria G. Lorenzo (1988–1992)
Lylia Corporal-Sena (1992–1999)
Emiliano A. Aberin (1999–2003)
Susana C. Cabredo (2003–2007)
Fay Lea Patria M. Lauraya (2007–2015)
Arnulfo M. Mascariñas (2015–2023)
Baby Boy Benjamin D. Nebres III (2023–Present)

== Campus ==
=== Legazpi West (main) campus ===
The Multipurpose Building which houses the College of Artes and Letras and the Graduate School. In background is the tip of the famous Mayon Volcano.

The College of Medicine

The Legazpi West (Main) Campus is located on the boundary of Daraga, Albay and Legazpi along the national highway, Rizal St. Aside from the Administration Building.

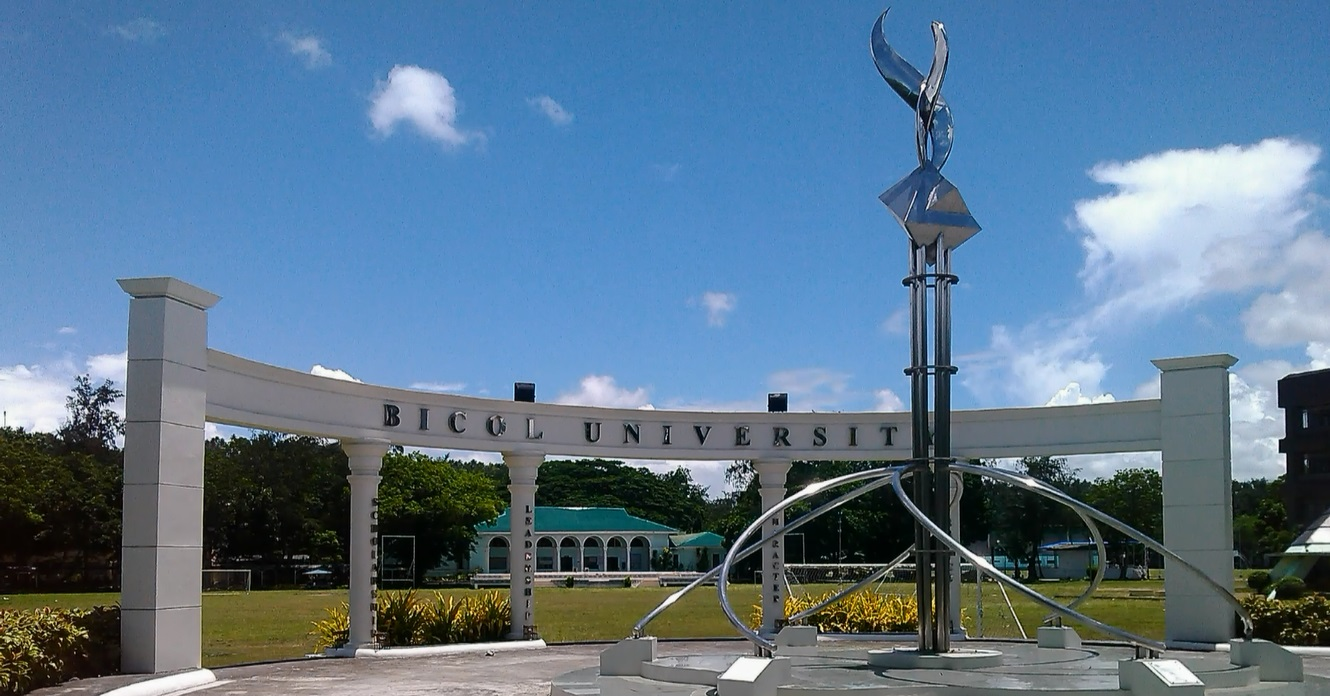
Bicol University's Torch of Wisdom

=== Legazpi East campus ===
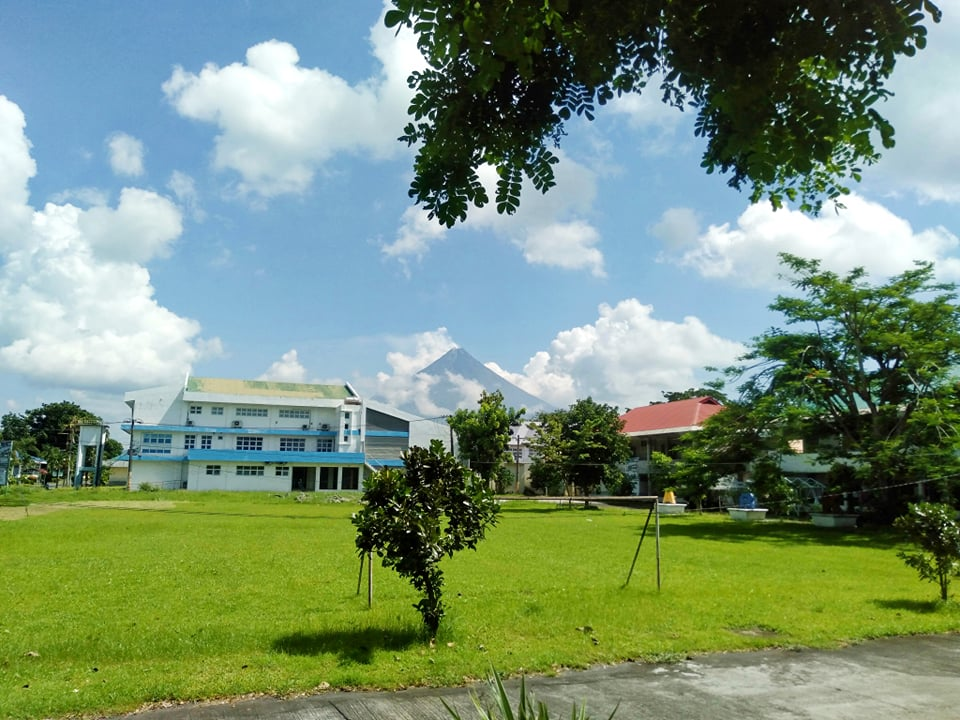
Bicol University East Campus

Located in Enlisted Men's Barrio (EM's Barrio), Barangay 1 also in Legazpi, the campus houses the College of Engineering (BUCENG), College of Industrial Technology (BUCIT), and Institute of Design and Architecture (BUIDeA).

=== Daraga campus ===
Located in Sagpon, Daraga, Albay, and is less than a kilometer from the main campus, the campus consists of the College of Social Sciences and Philosophy (BUCSSP) and College of Business, Economics and Management (BUCBEM). This campus was formerly called College of Arts and Science (BUCAS).

=== Tabaco campus ===
BU Tabaco Campus (BUTC), is located at Brgy. Tayhi, Tabaco, Albay.

=== Guinobatan campus ===
BU Guinobatan Campus (BUGbtn) formerly BUCAF is located along the Pan-Philippine Highway in the town of Guinobatan, Albay, formerly known as Guinobatan Farm School in 1912; Guinobatan Rural High School in 1927; Roxas Memorial Agricultural School in 1950; Bicol University College of Agriculture (BUCA) in 1969 through RA 5521; with the offering of Bachelor of Science in Forestry starting in 1991, is known as Bicol University College of Agriculture and Forestry (BUCAF). In 2022, the LGU Guinobatan passed an ordinance in renaming the campus to BU Guinobatan. BUCAF is a member of Philippine Agroforestry Education and Research Network (PAFERN).

=== Polangui campus ===
BU Polangui Campus (BUPC) is located in Centro Occidental, Polangui, Albay, this was formerly known as the School for Philippine Craftsmen and offered vocational courses. It was integrated into Bicol University, through R.A. 7722, R.A. 8292 & R.A. 8769, on December 14, 2000, and renamed as Bicol University Polangui Campus.

=== Gubat campus ===
Gubat Campus (BUGubat) is located in Gubat, Sorsogon, the only campus outside of Albay,

=== Ligao campus ===
BU College of Veterinary Medicine (BUCVM) is currently under construction at Bay, Ligao. It came into existence through Republic Act No. 11973, or the law to establish the Bicol University College of Veterinary Medicine in Ligao.

== Facilities and services ==
=== Library System ===
The University Library System is for the use of students and other researchers. It has a collection of books in different fields of knowledge and all the published undergraduate and graduate research.

=== Athletics ===
It organizes and facilitates the conduct of intercollegiate sports and the university's participation in sports events. It runs wellness and fitness programs. Some of its facilities for athletics include a soccer field, olympic-sized swimming pool, a rubberized track oval, and a grandstand.

=== Radio station ===
The university has its own radio station, BUFM 106.3.

== Notable alumni ==
- Jojo Bragais (BUCN; Bachelor of Science in Nursing) Businessperson; owner of Jojo Bragais shoes.
- Venus Raj (BUCAL; ComArts, Major in Journalism) was Miss Philippines Earth 2008 (Miss Philippines Eco Tourism 2008), Binibining Pilipinas 2010 (Binibining Pilipinas Universe 2010), Miss Universe 2010 (4th Runner-Up)
- Jun Jun Zorilla (BUCAS; Bachelor of Arts in Political Science) Former Municipal Mayor of Bato, Camarines Sur from June 30, 2022 to June 30, 2025.
