= Cabigaan =

- Barangay
- Interactive map of Cabigaan
- Location in Sorsogon Location in Luzon Location in the Philippines
- Coordinates: 12.893°N 124.091°E
- Country: Philippines
- Region: Bicol Region
- Province: Sorsogon
- Municipality: Gubat

Cabigaan is a barangay in Gubat, Sorsogon, Philippines. Its population was 1,069 at the 2020 Census.

== Description ==
Cabigaan is almost 6 kilometers from Gubat town proper. Cabigaan's geography is characterised by small plains and mountainous, heavily forested areas with several streams. A relatively isolated area, the primary source of income is agriculture, including the rearing of animals. The forests allow for foraging when planting season is over: copra and pili nuts abound in the forests.

== Education ==
The bararngay has one school, Cabigaan Elementary School. The nearest secondary school is in Barangay Bulacao.

== Transportation ==
From Gubat town proper, one can ride a bicycle or tricycle to Cabigaan in 15 minutes.
