= Jun Jun Zorilla =

Filipino politician

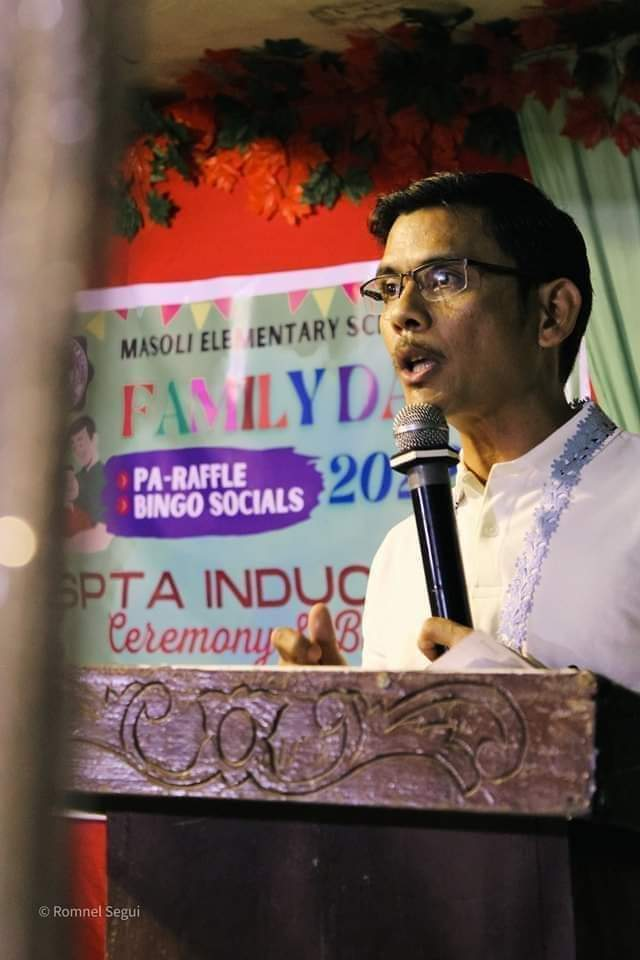
- Portrait of Mayor Zorilla

45th Mayor of Bato, Camarines Sur
- In office June 30, 2022 – June 30, 2025
- Vice Mayor: Hon. Victorio S. Ramos
- Preceded by: Hon. Frank B. Bernaldez
- Succeeded by: Hon. Enric L. Dancalan

Vice Mayor of Bato, Camarines Sur
- In office June 30, 2019 – June 30, 2022
- Mayor: Hon. Frank B. Bernaldez
- Preceded by: Hon. Victorio S. Ramos
- Succeeded by: Hon. Victorio S. Ramos

Personal details
- Spouse: Irene Talagtag Zorilla
- Children: Kin Iroz T. Zorilla; King Iroz T. Zorilla; Kien Iroz T. Zorilla; Kitz Iroz T. Zorilla
- Parents: Domingo Zorilla, Sr.; Josephine T. Landagan
- Education: Bicol University

Domingo "Jun Jun" Landagan Zorilla Jr. (born June 4, 1980) is a Filipino politician who previously served as Mayor of Bato, Camarines Sur from June 30, 2022, until June 30, 2025. He previously served as Vice-Mayor from June 30, 2019, until June 30, 2022.

== Personal life ==
Jun Jun Zorilla is a graduate of Bachelor of Arts in political science from Bicol University. Jun Jun Zorilla is married to Irene Talagtag. They have four children: Kin Iroz, King Iroz, Kien Iroz, and Kitz Iroz.

== Political career ==
=== As municipal mayor ===
From 2019 to 2022, Zorilla served as the Vice Mayor of Bato, under Mayor Frank B. Bernaldez. In the 2022 local elections, Zorilla was elected as Municipal Mayor in the 2022 local elections, running under the Nationalist People's Coalition (NPC) slate.

During his term, Zorilla has promoted social and technical-vocational initiatives aimed at economic upliftment. In March 2024, he joined TESDA CASIFMAS in awarding certification to 284 beneficiaries who completed various skills trainings, helping them pursue employment opportunities or entrepreneurial ventures.

==== May 2023 ====
In May 2023, Mayor Domingo L. Zorilla Jr. was issued a 60-day preventive suspension by Governor Luigi Villafuerte, based on the recommendation of the Sangguniang Panlalawigan in connection with Administrative Case No. 005-2023. The case alleged grave misconduct and acts prejudicial to the public service involving the leasing of a municipal building.

After the suspension ended on July 7, Zorilla attempted to return to office on July 10 but found the municipal hall locked. He forcibly removed the padlock himself but was unable to resume work. A new six-month suspension order was served, which his legal team contested as not yet final and executory, pending appeal.
