= Bulacao =

- Barangay
- Interactive map of Bulacao
- Location in Sorsogon Location in Luzon Location in the Philippines
- Coordinates: 12.88571°N 124.09463°E
- Country: Philippines
- Region: Bicol Region
- Province: Sorsogon
- Municipality: Gubat

Bulacao is a barangay in Gubat municipality, Sorsogon province, Philippines. Its population was 2,024 at the 2015 Census.

== Description ==
Bulacao is a barangay in Gubat. An inland barangay, agriculture is the primary source of income here. Duck, poultry and hog raising are secondary sources of income.

== Education ==
Primary school:

- Bulacao Elementary School

Note: Some parents from Cabigaan send their children here.

Secondary school:

- Bulacao National High School

Some students came from Cabigaan, Union, Gubat, and other inland barangays.

== Transportation ==
Bulacao is easily accessible by tricycles and private vehicles due to good roads.
