= Bulusan High School =

Public high school in Sorsogon, Philippines

Location
- Boundary of Madlawon and Dancalan, Region V Bulusan, Sorsogon; Philippines
- Coordinates: 12°45′11″N 124°08′06″E

Information
- Established: 2000
- Status: Public
- Enrollment: approx. 1,000
- Language: English, Filipino
- Colors: Blue and white
- Nickname: BHS, Bulusan HS, Laboy (Local)
- Newspaper: Bulos Aguingay
- Affiliations: Division of Sorsogon, Department of Education

Bulusan High School is the first DepEd recognized public high school in the vicinity of Bulusan Poblacion, province of Sorsogon, Philippines. It was founded October 4, 2000 through the efforts of local government, parents, students, volunteer teachers and Albertini Montenegro Jr., teacher-in-charge (2000-2005), who donated a parcel of land. After two years of operation, the high school department of Bulusan National Vocational Technical School, at San Jose, Bulusan, Sorsogon was turned over to the school. At the first four years of operation the staff was composed mostly of volunteers with some deployed teachers from neighboring schools. In six years of operation it accommodated the highest enrollment of all high schools in the municipality.

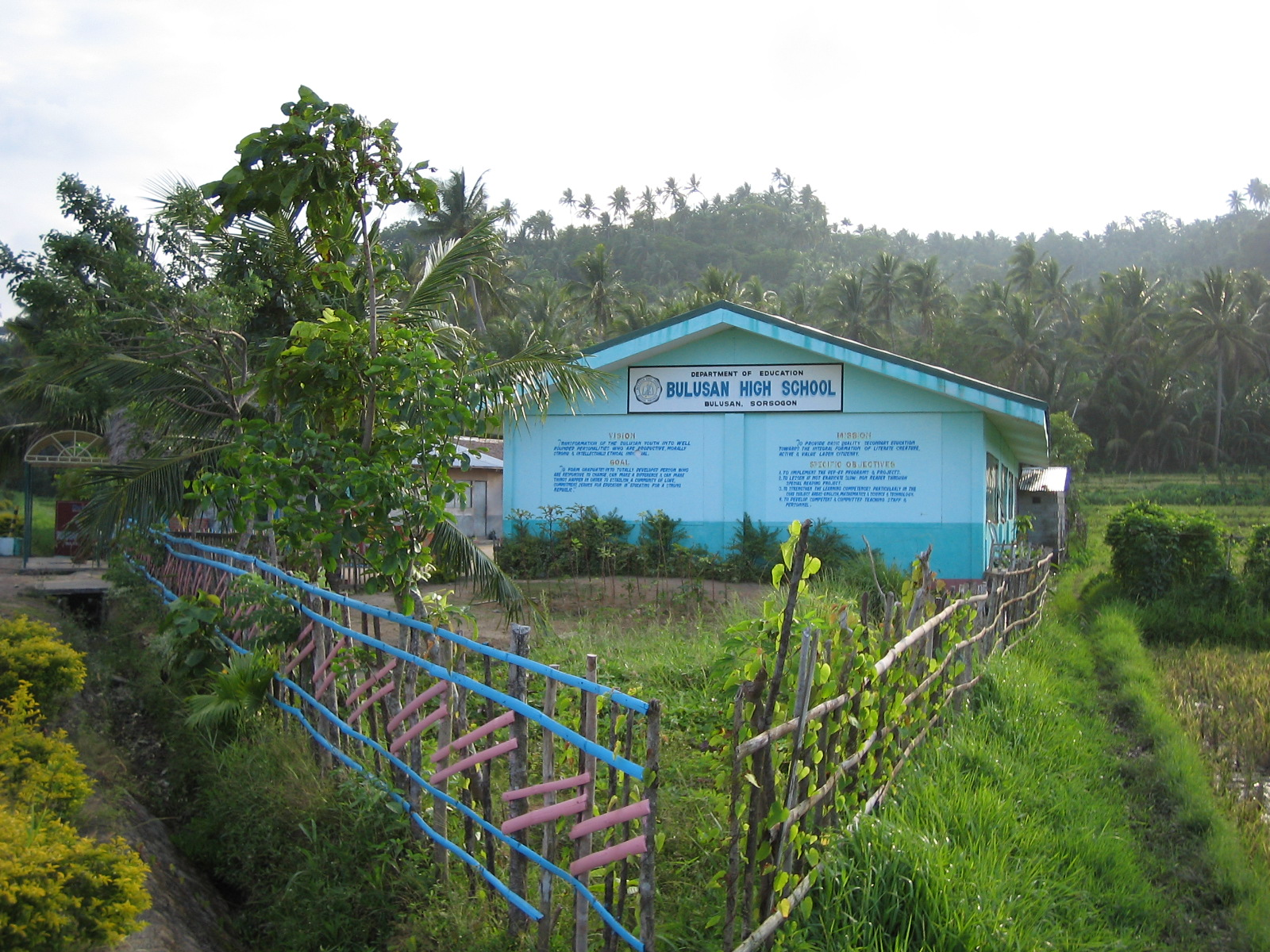
Bulusan High School

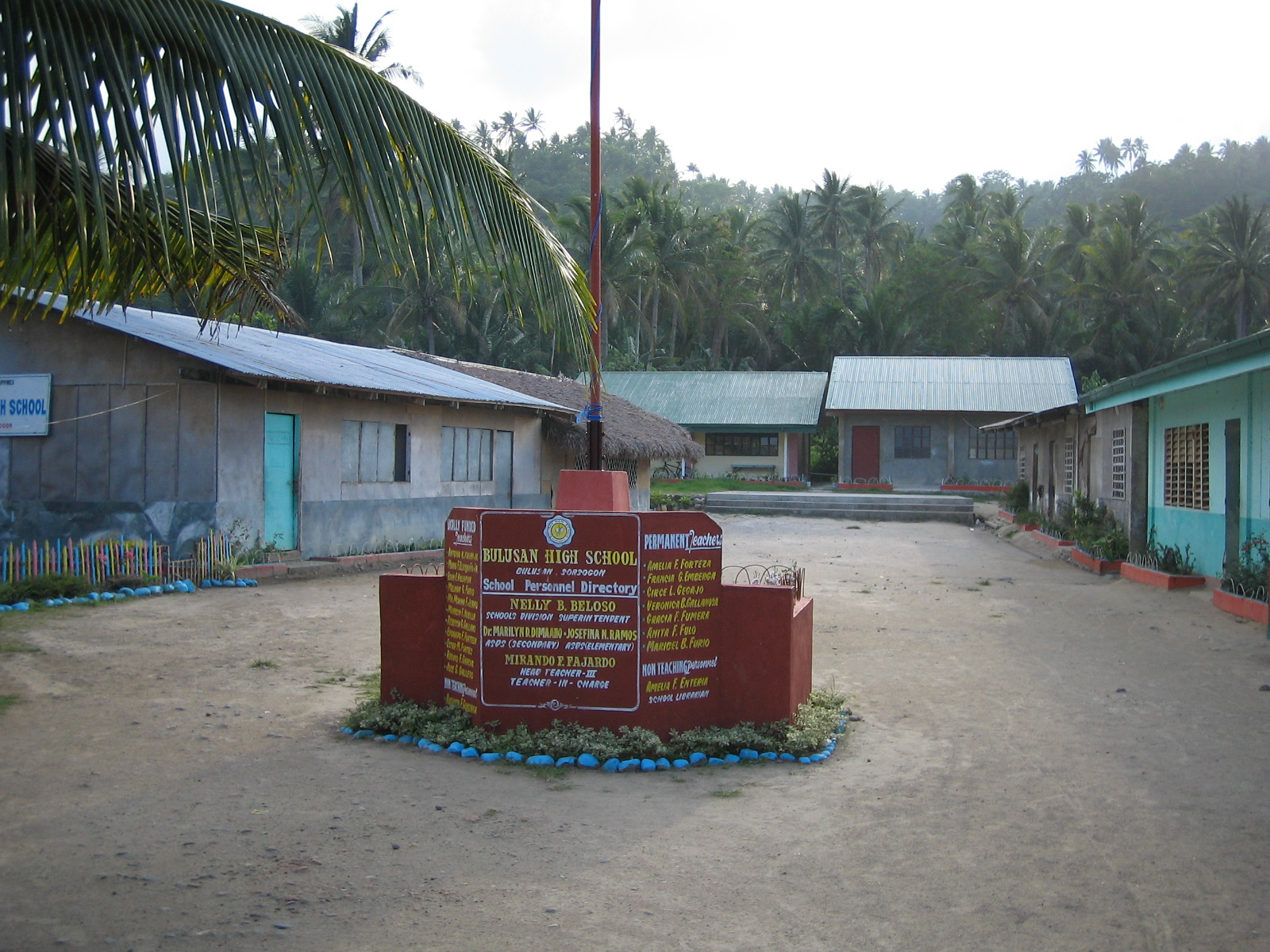
Bulusan High School 2007 picture

== History ==
Bulusan High School started in 2000 in a rice field at Dancalan, Bulusan, Sorsogon with only one temporary building made of wood and nipa for freshmen. It was nicknamed 'Laboy' (mud) by the locals because it is in a very muddy paddy and it exemplifies its humble beginning. The lot was donated by Albertini Montenegro Jr. who headed the school for five years.

It was followed by a three-room semi-permanent building donated by the local government through the town's mayor, Hon. Juan G. Guysayko to accommodate the surging enrollment. The school was recognized by the national government through House of Representative Bill No. 3361 authored by Jose Solis through committee report 245 co-authored by Lagman and De Guzman.

Due to absence of public secondary school in Bulusan town proper other than that offered by Bulusan National Vocational and Technical School which could only accommodate a few qualified students, young Buluseños enrolled at San Roque and Dr. Espeña (Buhang) High School and even to neighboring towns. In the vicinity of Bulusan Poblacion there was only Jose S. Reyes Memorial Foundation (Inc.) School, a private institution, which offers secondary course. Later, the Immaculate Heart of Mary School offered the same.

Albertini Montenegro Jr. was replaced briefly by Veronica Gallanosa as teacher-in-charge, followed by Mirando Fajardo. In 2006, Ave E. Mendizabal took over as the first school principal. The first commencement was held March 2003.

=== Bulusan National Vocational and Technical School integration ===
In 2002, the Department of Education ordered the TESDA-sponsored Bulusan National Vocational and Technical School to turn over its high school department to Bulusan High School. A group of students, mostly juniors and seniors (Grades 9 and 10), and five secondary school teachers added to the enrollment and staff — making a steep increase of its population.

=== Extension ===
In 2006 Bulusan High School made another extension at Barangay Poctol, Bulusan, Sorsogon, at the back of Bulusan Central School, to accommodate a very high volume of enrollees: mostly freshmen.

== Publication ==
The school paper at the start was named The Dawn by advisers, Sheila Marie Dino and Anita Fulo.

In 2006 when Joel France and Circe Gegajo managed the school publication and news conferences the name was changed to Bulos Aguingay due to the similarity of The Dawn from other school paper in Region V. Aguingay was a very popular name in Bulusan, a legendary mistress of a hero named Bulusan himself. A vast rainy day lake in the middle of Bulusan Volcano National Park is called Lake Aguingay. Bulos is taken from the name of the town Bulusan which means "to pour water." Bulos means "water surge." From these names the school approved Bulos Aguingay as its official publication in English and in Filipino. Student-staff of the publication have garnered awards from local, division, and regional press competitions and conferences.

== Curriculum ==
Pursuant to its recognition, Bulusan High School offers general secondary education of Basic Education Curriculum as mandated by the Department of Education of the Philippines.

== Senior High School ==
As mandated by law, Bulusan High School is now offering various strands for Senior High School.
