= Gubat =

Municipality in Sorsogon, Philippines

- Municipality
- Municipality of Gubat
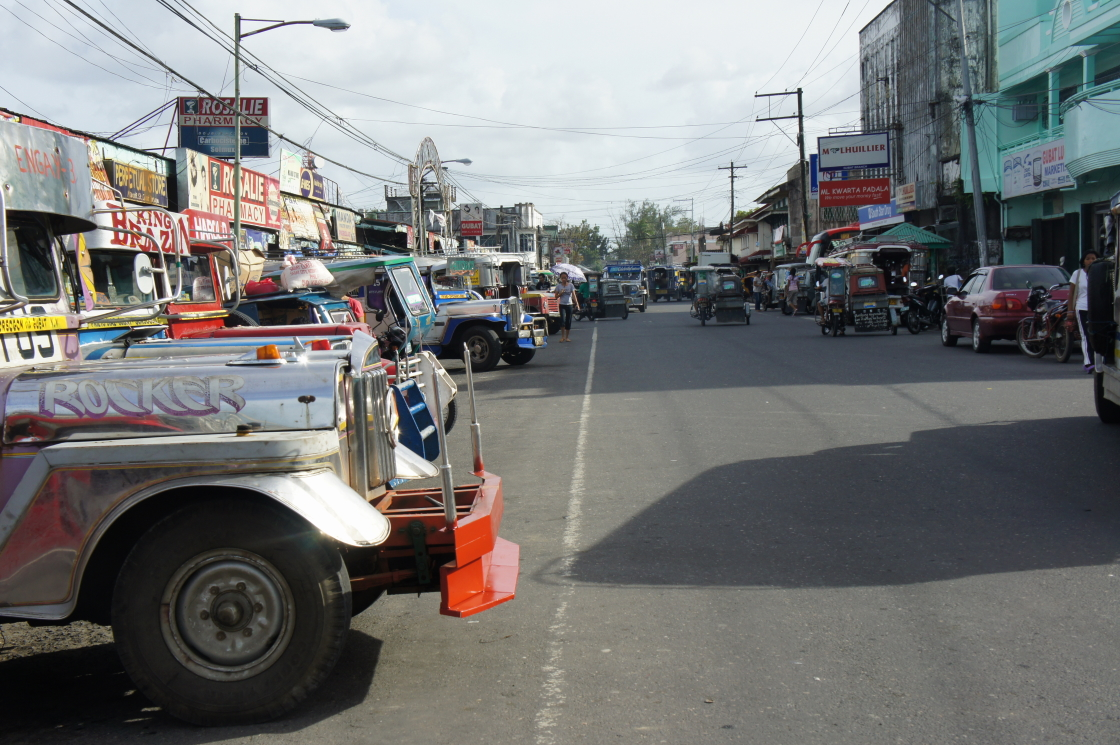
- Downtown area

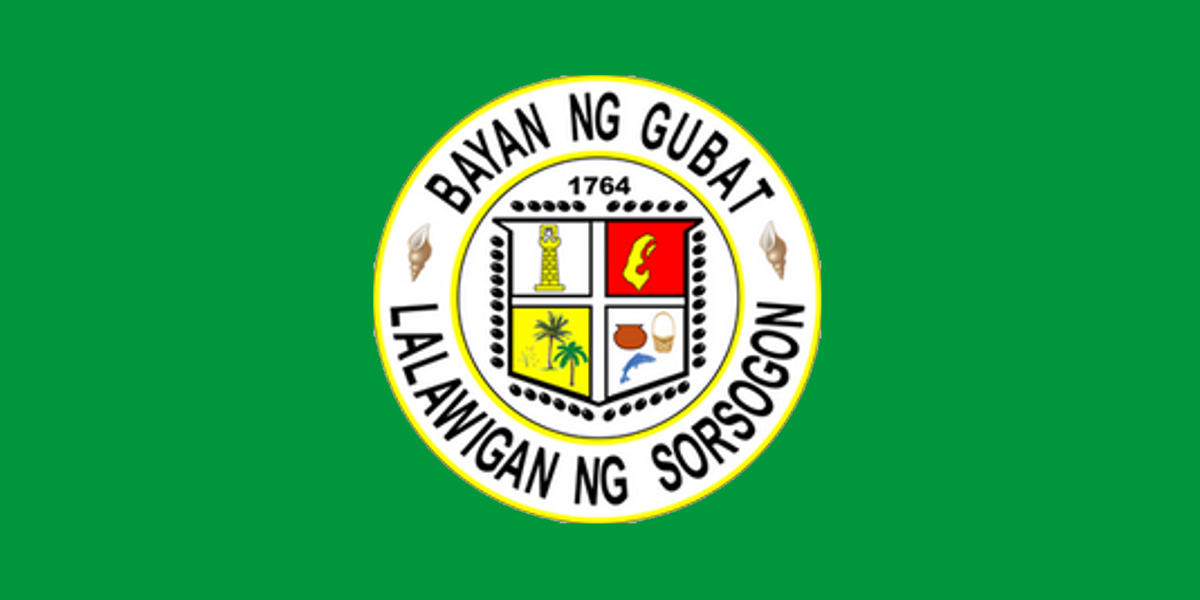
- Flag Seal
- Motto: Gubat is for Life
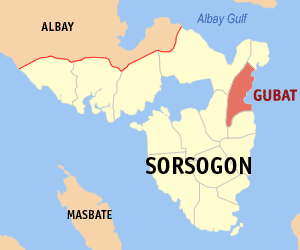
- Map of Sorsogon with Gubat highlighted
- Interactive map of Gubat
- Location within the Philippines
- Coordinates: 12°55′08″N 124°07′23″E
- Country: Philippines
- Region: Bicol Region
- Province: Sorsogon
- District: 2nd district
- Founded: June 13, 1764
- Barangays: 42 (see Barangays)

Government
  - Type: Sangguniang Bayan
  - Mayor: Ronnel U. Lim
  - Vice Mayor: Valentin A. Pura IV
  - Representative: Vacant
  - Municipal Council: Members: Jodan Enaje; Mark Anthony Flestado; Roxan Escanilla; Erwin Estremera; Danilo Pura; Anthony Callos; Cesar Esperida Jr.; Noe Endaya
  - Electorate: 41,722 voters (2025)

Area
  - Total: 134.51 km^{2} (51.93 sq mi)
- Elevation: 14 m (46 ft)
- Highest elevation: 93 m (305 ft)
- Lowest elevation: 0 m (0 ft)

Population (2024 census)
  - Total: 61,095
  - Density: 454.20/km^{2} (1,176.4/sq mi)
  - Households: 14,568
- Demonym: Gubatnons

Economy
  - Income class: 1st municipal income class
  - Poverty incidence: 29.99% (2023)
  - Revenue: ₱ 328.6 million (2024)
  - Assets: ₱ 919.4 million (2024)
  - Expenditure: ₱ 309 million (2024)
  - Liabilities: ₱ 306 million (2024)

Service provider
  - Electricity: Sorsogon 2 Electric Cooperative (SORECO 2)
- Time zone: UTC+8 (PST)
- ZIP code: 4710
- PSGC: 0506208000
- IDD : area code: +63 (0)56
- Native languages: Sorsogon language Tagalog
- Website: www.gubat.gov.ph

Gubat, officially the Municipality of Gubat (Gubatnon: Bungto san Gubat; Waray: Bungto han Gubat, Tagalog: Bayan ng Gubat), is a municipality in the province of Sorsogon, Philippines. According to the 2024 census, it has a population of 61,095 people.

It is pronounced with the accent on the second syllable. The people who live here speak the Gubat language which is also a dialect of Waray-Waray of Eastern Visayas, a Southern Sorsoganon sub-language and they were called Gubatnons.

== History ==
Gubat was originally a big barrio of Bulusan, inhabited by a few Tagalogs, Visayans and Albayanons who travelled on foot to hunt wild animals. These people built their homes close to the shore and called their location Buri, which today is the barrio of Buenavista. In 1764, Gubat finally became a town with Don Pedro Manook, the first Teniente del Barrio, also becoming the first gobernadorcillo. The town proper is named after Don Pedro Manook.

The word "gúbat" means forest in Tagalog. However, the name applied to the town is derived from the verb "guinobat", a term used by the natives which means "raided". In the early days when Christians and Muslims were constantly at odds, Muslim pirates, the Moros, would come in from the southern seas to raid the town. Due to the frequent raids, the town was referred to as "guinobat" which eventually became "Gubat". Legend has it that during one of those raids, the pastor along with the townspeople held up a statue of St. Anthony to ward off the attack, praying for a miracle. In one account, it was said that the child Jesus in St. Anthony's arms drove back the pirates. Hence, St. Anthony of Padua became the town's patron saint, and his feast day is lavishly celebrated as an official parish and town holiday every 13 June.

The town settlers had to move a number of times before finally deciding to settle at a place they considered safe and peaceful. Eventually, they began to expand, laying out permanent streets, the first of which are what we now know as Luna and Calderon Streets.

The main parish church itself has an interesting history. In 1768, the people decided to build a church. The locals, being poor, urged the town captain, Don Juan Bonifacio, to require all men to contribute one cubic meter of "talaksan" (coral stone) apiece. It took ten years of preparation, and it was not until 1778 that construction finally started.

Although it has since undergone several renovations, the church foundation is still the original one built in 1778. The rectory is the oldest and one of the only two remaining rectories dating back that far in the entire Bicol region.

The 1818 census showed 2,162 native families paying tribute and they were coexisting with 52 Spanish-Filipino families in the area of which, 2 were Spanish families from the Americas (Latin Americans), and 1 family was pure Spanish (European).

In November 2006, Gubat became the site of a scientific expedition by astronomers Dr. Armando Lee, Bamm Gabriana, and Rochelle Derilo to observe the rare Mercury transit. Gubat was the best town in Luzon to observe the event.

== Geography ==
Gubat is in the south-eastern part of the island of Luzon, along the coast of the Pacific Ocean on the Bicol Peninsula. It is the third largest town in the province of Sorsogon and is divided into 2 districts: the North District and South District.

It has 11,116.98 hectares’ total land area, and a total of 18,980 hectares of municipal waters and coral reef.

Gubat comprises 42 barangays, eight of which are classified as urban and located in the poblacion area, while the rest are classified as rural.

=== Barangays ===
Gubat is politically subdivided into 42 barangays. Each barangay consists of puroks and some have sitios.

Barangays with (Poblacion) indicate that barangay is part of the town proper or poblacion.

- Ariman
- Bagacay
- Balud Del Norte (Poblacion)
- Balud Del Sur (Poblacion)
- Benguet
- Bentuco
- Beriran
- Buenavista
- Bulacao
- Cabigaan
- Cabiguhan
- Carriedo
- Casili
- Cogon
- Cota Na Daco (Poblacion)
- Dita
- Jupi
- Lapinig
- Luna-Candol (Poblacion)
- Manapao
- Manook (Poblacion)
- Naagtan
- Nato
- Nazareno
- Ogao
- Paco
- Panganiban (Poblacion)
- Paradijon (Poblacion)
- Patag
- Payawin
- Pinontingan (Poblacion)
- Rizal
- San Ignacio
- Sangat
- Santa Ana
- Tabi
- Tagaytay
- Tigkiw
- Tiris
- Togawe
- Union
- Villareal

=== Climate ===
Climate data for Gubat, Sorsogon
Month	Jan	Feb	Mar	Apr	May	Jun	Jul	Aug	Sep	Oct	Nov	Dec	Year
Mean daily maximum °C (°F)	27 (81)	28 (82)	29 (84)	31 (88)	31 (88)	30 (86)	29 (84)	29 (84)	29 (84)	29 (84)	29 (84)	28 (82)	29 (84)
Mean daily minimum °C (°F)	22 (72)	21 (70)	22 (72)	23 (73)	24 (75)	25 (77)	25 (77)	25 (77)	25 (77)	24 (75)	23 (73)	23 (73)	24 (74)
Average precipitation mm (inches)	65 (2.6)	44 (1.7)	42 (1.7)	39 (1.5)	87 (3.4)	150 (5.9)	184 (7.2)	153 (6.0)	163 (6.4)	154 (6.1)	127 (5.0)	100 (3.9)	1,308 (51.4)
Average rainy days	13.9	9.2	11.0	12.5	19.6	24.3	26.5	25.0	25.5	24.4	19.4	15.1	226.4
Source: Meteoblue

== Demographics ==
Population census of Gubat
Year	Pop.	±% p.a.
1903	15,590	—
1918	19,311	+1.44%
1939	22,880	+0.81%
1948	29,245	+2.76%
1960	31,028	+0.49%
1970	38,412	+2.16%
1975	38,504	+0.05%
1980	43,866	+2.64%
1990	43,296	−0.13%
1995	49,716	+2.62%
2000	52,707	+1.26%
2007	55,501	+0.71%
2010	57,327	+1.18%
2015	59,534	+0.72%
2020	60,294	+0.27%
2024	61,095	+0.32%
Source: Philippine Statistics Authority

=== Religions ===
Although, the dominant religion is Roman Catholicism, there are Gubatnons devoted to:

- Iglesia ni Cristo
- Protestant Evangelical Baptist
- Islam (some traders and residents)
- Buddhism (Chinese traders and residents)
- Members Church of God International
- The Church of Jesus Christ of Latter-Day Saints
- Seventh Day Adventist
- Baptist
- Jehovah's Witness

== Economy ==
Poverty incidence of Gubat (%)

Source: Philippine Statistics Authority

The main livelihoods of the people, then and now, are agriculture and fishing. Harvest times for rice crops are from April to May, and December. Fishing is year-round. Forestry products are also source of income here.

== Transportation ==
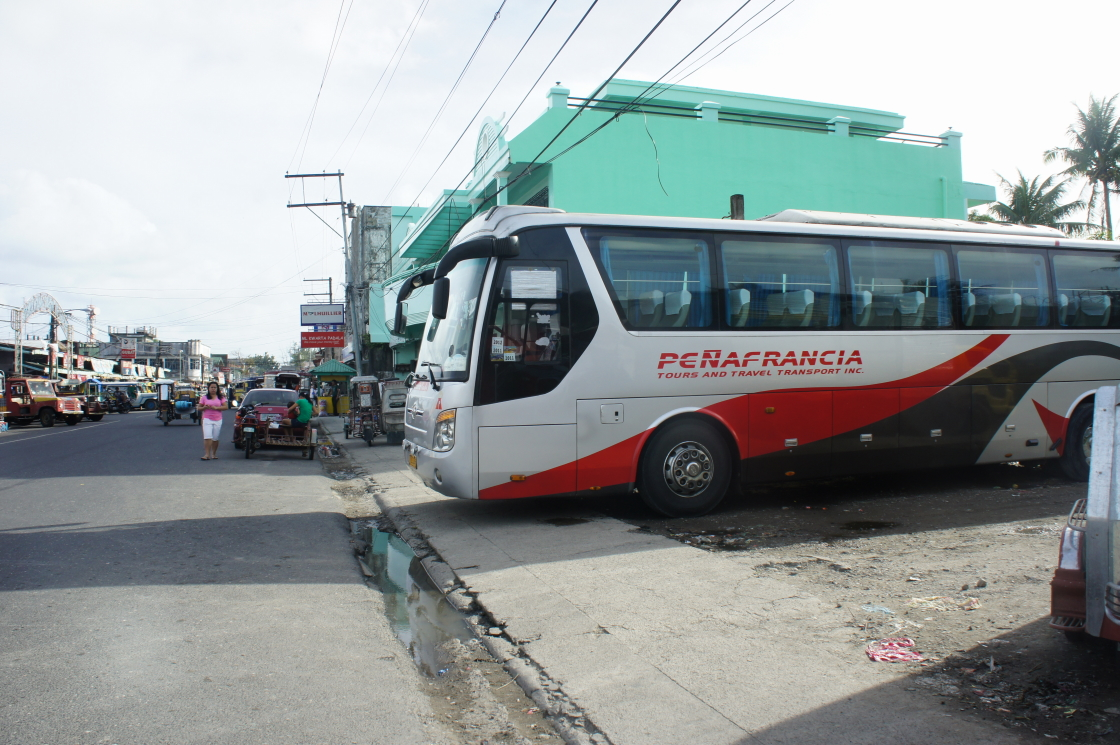
Bus Terminal in Gubat

Gubat can be reached mostly through land transport from Manila by bus, taking about 12 hours. There are several bus companies that operates daily from Manila to Gubat and vice versa: Alps The Bus Inc., JVH Transport/Pamar, Elavil Tours Phils. Inc., Raymond Transportation, St.Jude Transit, CUL Transport, DLTBCo., Penafrancia Tours/RSL/Isarog and Philtranco.

There are also jeepneys that provide transportation to Sorsogon City, Bulusan, Barcelona, Prieto-Diaz, Casiguran, Irosin and local barangays like Tigkiw, Bentuco and Benguet. Local tricycles travel to the innermost barangays like Union, Bulacao, Rizal, Cabigaan and Sangat.

== Infrastructure ==
=== Communications ===
The town has modern and efficient communications facilities including cellular mobile phones such as Sun Cellular, Globe LTE, and Smart 3G. Telephone companies include PLDT, and Digitel.

Cable TV networks include ANH Cable TV, and DCTV Cable offering broadband service.

Satellite cable companies include Cignal, G Sat, Dream Satellite, and Sky Direct.

== Sports ==
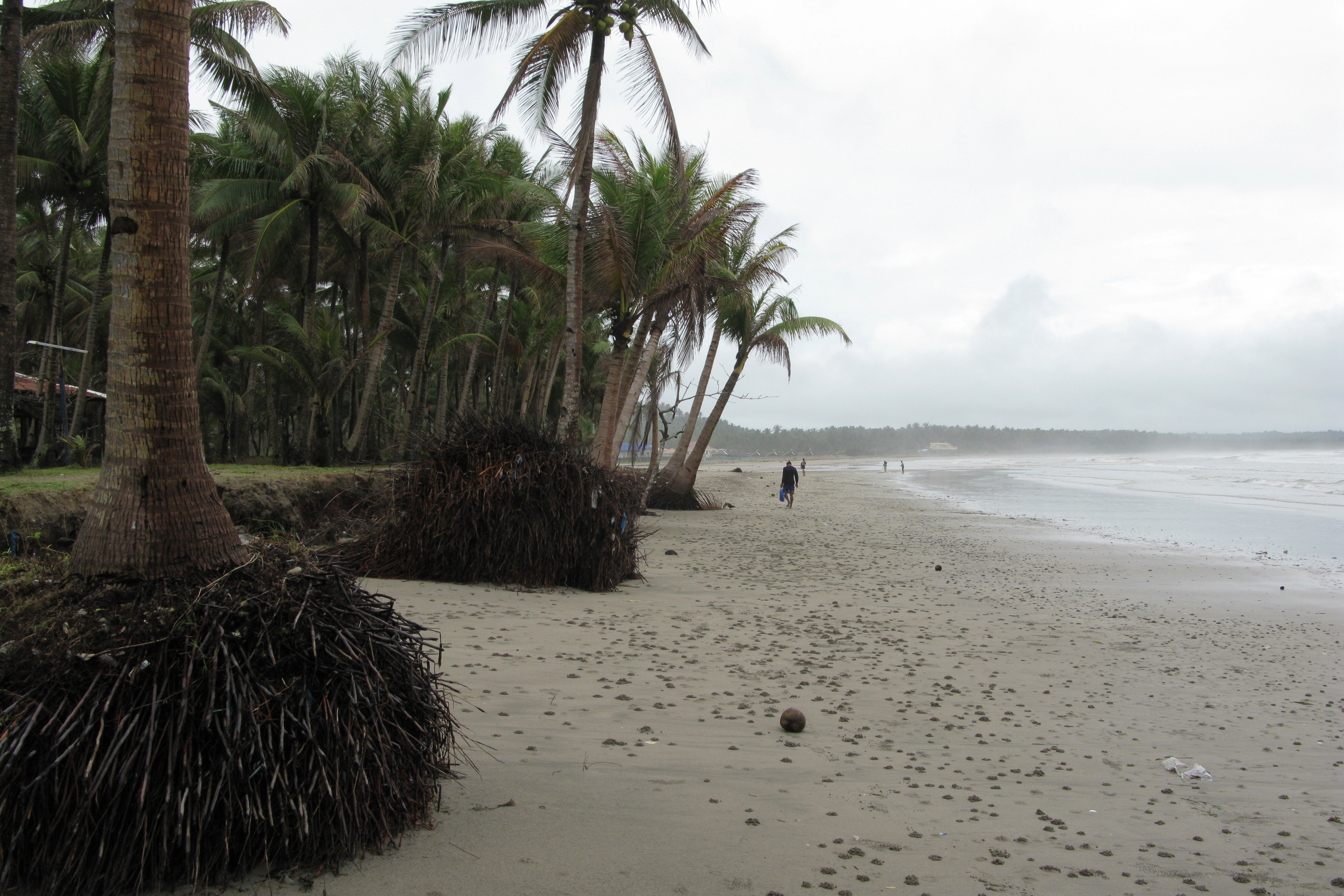
The beach

Gubat is slowly being recognized as the only beginner friendly surfing spot in the province of Sorsogon. The sand bottom beach breaks of Barangays Ariman and Buenavista (Dangkalan and Rizal Beach) produce 2 to 5 feet waves from September to May. With the formation of Gubat Bay Surfers and surfboards donated by the Local Government Unit under Mayor Ding Ramos, surfing is more accessible to the local population and tourists alike. The Gubat Sorsogon Surfriders Association, Inc. (GSSA) headed by Bidge Villarroya, is also performing well in the National Surf Competition Scene, winning several national surf championships and numerous finalist positions. Gubat is the Top 1 in Ngo Sport Airsoft Society by the NGO Bicol Sorsogon Chapter.

== Culture ==
=== Festivals ===
The town celebrates its Ginubat Festival annually every June 1–13 in honor of its patron, St. Anthony of Padua. It is also the foundation of the town.

== Education ==
There are two schools district offices which govern all educational institutions within the municipality. They oversee the management and operations of all private and public, from primary to secondary schools. These are the:

- Gubat North Schools District
- Gubat South Schools District

=== Primary and elementary schools ===
- Aguinaldo Elementary School
- Ariman Elementary School
- Bagacay Elementary School
- Benguet Elementary School
- Bentuco Elementary School
- Beriran Elementary School
- Bongsaran Elementary School
- Bonifacio Elementary School
- Buenavista Elementary School
- Bulacao Elementary School
- Cabigaan Elementary School
- Cabiguhan Elementary School
- Carriedo Elementary School
- Casili Elementary School
- Cogon Elementary School
- Dita Elementary School
- Gubat North Central School
- Gubat South Central School
- Jupi Elementary School
- Landmark Baptist Academy
- Lapinig Elementary School
- Manapao Elementary School
- Naagtan Elementary School
- Nato Elementary School
- Nazareno Elementary School
- Ogao Elementary School
- Paco Elementary School
- Patag Elementary School
- Payawin Elementary School
- Rizal Elementary School
- San Ignacio Elementary School
- San Ignacio Elementary School
- Sangat Elementary School
- Santa Ana Elementary School
- Tabi Elementary School
- Tagaytay Elementary School
- Tigkiw Elementary School
- Tiris Elementary School
- Togawe Elementary School
- Union Elementary School
- Villareal Elementary School

=== Secondary schools ===
- Bagacay National High School
- Bentuco National High School
- Bulacao National High School
- Gubat National High School
- Jupi National High School
- Landmark Baptist Academy
- Rizal National High School
- St. Louise De Marillac College

=== Higher educational institutions ===
- Bicol University (Gubat Campus)
- Data Base Technology Computer School

== Media ==
- DWPS FM 91.1 mHz "Rainbow Radio"
- Padaba (Gubat) 105.1 mHz
