= Legislative districts of Camarines Norte =

Legislative district of the Philippines

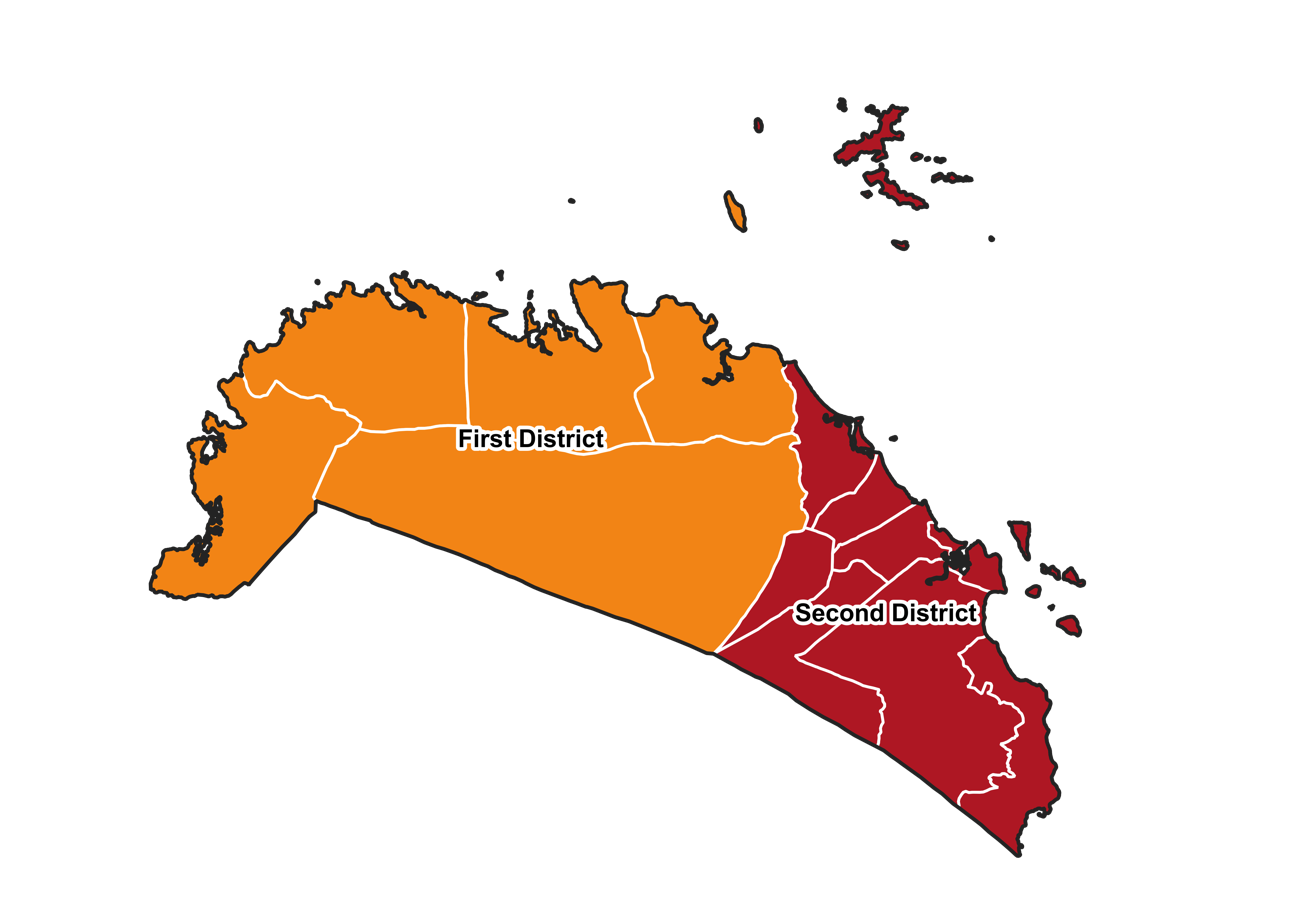
Districts of Camarines Norte

The legislative districts of Camarines Norte are the representations of the province of Camarines Norte in the various national legislatures of the Philippines. The province is currently represented in the lower house of the Congress of the Philippines through its first and second congressional districts.

== History ==
Camarines Norte was represented as part of Ambos Camarines, particularly the at-large district in the Malolos Congress from 1898 to 1899 and the first and second districts beginning in 1907, prior to being granted its own representation, after the division of Ambos Camarines in 1919 into Norte and Sur. From 1978 to 1984, it was part of the representation of Region V.

The passage of Republic Act No. 9725 in 2009 abolished the lone district and divided the province into two districts starting in the 2010 elections.

== Current Districts ==
Legislative districts and representatives of Camarines Norte
District	Current Representative	Party	Constituent LGUs	Population (2020)	Area	Map
1st	Josefina Tallado (since 2019); Labo	NPC	List: Capalonga; Jose Panganiban; Labo; Paracale; Santa Elena	312,910	1,491.05 km²	
2nd	Rosemarie Panotes (since 2022); Daet	Lakas–CMD	List: Basud; Daet; Mercedes; San Lorenzo Ruiz; San Vicente; Talisay; Vinzons	316,789	829.02 km²	

== Historical districts ==
=== Lone District (defunct) ===
Period	Representative
5th Philippine Legislature; 1919–1922	Gabriel Hernandez
6th Philippine Legislature; 1922–1925	Jose D. Zeñarosa
7th Philippine Legislature; 1925–1928	Rafael Caranceja
8th Philippine Legislature; 1928–1931	Agustin Lukban
9th Philippine Legislature; 1931–1934	Miguel Lukban
10th Philippine Legislature; 1934–1935	Gabriel Hernandez
1st National Assembly; 1935–1938	Froilan Pimentel
2nd National Assembly; 1938–1941	Froilan Pimentel
1st Commonwealth Congress; 1945	vacant (Note: Wenceslao Q. Vinzons was elected in November 1941 but died before the start of the session on June 9, 1945.)
1st Congress; 1946–1949	Esmeraldo Eco
2nd Congress; 1949–1953	Esmeraldo Eco
3rd Congress; 1953–1957	Fernando V. Pajarillo
4th Congress; 1957–1961	Pedro Venida
5th Congress; 1961–1965	Marcial R. Pimentel
6th Congress; 1965–1969	Fernando V. Pajarillo
7th Congress; 1969–1972	Fernando V. Pajarillo
8th Congress; 1987–1992	Renato M. Unico
9th Congress; 1992–1995	Emmanuel B. Pimentel
10th Congress; 1995–1998	Emmanuel B. Pimentel
11th Congress; 1998–2001	Roy A. Padilla, Jr.
12th Congress; 2001–2004	Renato J. Unico, Jr.
13th Congress; 2004–2007	Renato J. Unico, Jr.
14th Congress; 2007–2010	Liwayway Vinzons-Chato

=== 1943–1944 ===
Period	Representative
National Assembly; 1943–1944	Carlos Ascutia
National Assembly; 1943–1944	Trinidad P. Zenarosa

=== 1984–1986 ===
Period	Representative
Regular Batasang Pambansa; 1984–1986	Roy B. Padilla

== See also ==
- Legislative districts of Ambos Camarines
