= Mount Labo =

Potentially active volcano in the Philippines

- Location within Camarines Norte Location within Luzon Location within Philippines

Highest point
- Elevation: 1,544 m (5,066 ft)
- Prominence: 1,524 m (5,000 ft)
- Isolation: 73.5 km (45.7 mi)
- Listing: Potentially active volcano; Ultra; Ribu
- Coordinates: 14°00′48″N 122°47′15″E

Geography
- Country: Philippines
- Region: Bicol Region; Calabarzon
- Province: Camarines Norte; Camarines Sur; Quezon
- Settlements: Del Gallego; Labo; San Lorenzo Ruiz; San Vicente; Tagkawayan

Geology
- Mountain types: Stratovolcano; Compound volcano; Lava dome
- Volcanic belt: Bicol Volcanic belt
- Last eruption: Pleistocene

Mount Labo, is a potentially active stratovolcano in the provinces of Camarines Norte and Camarines Sur in the Bicol Region (Region V) and Quezon in the Calabarzon (Region IV-A), on Luzon Island, in the Philippines. It is located at the northwest end of the Bicol Peninsula.

== Physical features ==
Labo is a forested andesitic stratovolcano, surrounded by numerous andesitic to dacitic satellite lava domes. It has an elevation of 1,544 meters (5,066 ft) asl. Base diameter of this complex volcano is 35 kilometers (22 mi). Labo is thermally active with both warm and hot springs.

== Economic activities ==
Mount Labo has been the object of an extensive geothermal exploration program.

== Eruptions ==
Mid-Pleistocene eruptions beginning about 580,000 years ago formed lava domes on the northern side of the complex. The present edifice was formed beginning about 270,000 years ago, and flank lava dome emplacement took place from about 200,000 to about 40,000 years ago.

The latest activity from Mt. Labo produced pyroclastic flows from the summit cone about 27,000 years ago. There have been no eruptions since.

== Geology ==
Rock type is predominantly hornblende-biotite andesite to dacite. Tectonically, Labo is part of the Bicol Volcanic belt.

== Listings ==
The Smithsonian Institution's Global Volcanism Program lists Labo as Pleistocene. Philippine Institute of Volcanology and Seismology (PHIVOLCS) lists Labo as Potentially Active.

== See also ==
- List of active volcanoes in the Philippines
- List of potentially active volcanoes in the Philippines
- List of inactive volcanoes in the Philippines
- List of ultras of the Philippines
- Philippine Institute of Volcanology and Seismology
- Pacific ring of fire
