= Camarines Norte's at-large congressional district =

Congressional district of the Philippines

Camarines Norte's at-large congressional district refers to the lone congressional district of the Philippines in the province of Camarines Norte for various national legislatures before 2010. The province first elected its representatives provincewide at-large in 1919 following the dissolution of Ambos Camarines into the present provinces of Camarines Norte and Camarines Sur. It was a single-member district for the final six legislatures of the Insular Government of the Philippine Islands from 1919 to 1935, the three legislatures of the Commonwealth of the Philippines from 1935 to 1946, the seven congresses of the Third Philippine Republic from 1946 to 1972, the national parliament of the Fourth Philippine Republic from 1984 to 1986, and the 8th to 14th congresses of the Fifth Philippine Republic from 1987 to 2010.

On one occasion in its history, Camarines Norte was represented by two members, one elected and one appointed, for the National Assembly of the Second Philippine Republic from 1943 to 1944. Between 1978 and 1984, all provinces were transformed into multi-seat regional at-large districts, with the province forming part of the twelve-seat Region V's at-large district. After the 2009 reapportionment, all representatives were elected from its two congressional districts.

The district was last represented by Liwayway Vinzons-Chato of the Liberal Party (LP).

== Representation history ==
#	Term of office		Legislature	Single seat							
#	Start	End	Legislature	Image	Member	Party	Electoral history				
=== Camarines Norte's at-large district for the House of Representatives of the Philippine Islands ===
District created March 3, 1919 from Ambos Camarines's 1st district.
1	June 3, 1919	June 6, 1922	5th		Gabriel Hernández	Nacionalista	Elected in 1919.				
2	June 6, 1922	June 2, 1925	6th		José D. Zeñarosa	Nacionalista; Colectivista	Elected in 1922.				
3	June 2, 1925	June 5, 1928	7th		Rafael Carranceja	Nacionalista; Consolidado	Elected in 1925.				
4	June 5, 1928	June 2, 1931	8th		Agustín Lukban	Nacionalista; Consolidado	Elected in 1928.				
5	June 2, 1931	June 5, 1934	9th		Miguel Lukban	Nacionalista; Consolidado	Elected in 1931.				
(1)	June 5, 1934	September 16, 1935	10th		Gabriel Hernández	Nacionalista; Democrático	Elected in 1934.				
#	Term of office		National Assembly	Single seat							
#	Start	End	National Assembly	Image	Member	Party	Electoral history				
=== Camarines Norte's at-large district for the National Assembly (Commonwealth of the Philippines) ===
6	November 15, 1935	September 30, 1936	1st		Cayetano Lukban	Nacionalista; Democrático	Elected in 1935. Election annulled by electoral commission due to lack of legal residency.				
7	August 3, 1937	December 30, 1941	1st		Froilán Pimentel	Nacionalista; Democrático	Elected in 1937 to finish Lukban's term.				
7	August 3, 1937	December 30, 1941	2nd		Froilán Pimentel	Nacionalista	Re-elected in 1938.				
#	Term of office		National Assembly	Seat A				Seat B			
#	Start	End	National Assembly	Image	Member	Party	Electoral history	Image	Member	Party	Electoral history
=== Camarines Norte's at-large district for the National Assembly (Second Philippine Republic) ===
District re-created September 7, 1943.
–	September 25, 1943	February 2, 1944	3rd		Trinidad P. Zeñarosa	KALIBAPI	Elected in 1943.		Carlos Ascutia	KALIBAPI	Appointed as an ex officio member.
#	Term of office		Common wealth Congress	Single seat				Seats eliminated			
#	Start	End	Common wealth Congress	Image	Member	Party	Electoral history	Seats eliminated			
=== Camarines Norte's at-large district for the House of Representatives of the Commonwealth of the Philippines ===								Seats eliminated			
District re-created May 24, 1945.								Seats eliminated			
8	–	–	1st		Wenceslao Vinzons	Young Philippines	Elected in 1941. Died before start of term.	Seats eliminated			
#	Term of office		Congress	Single seat				Seats eliminated			
#	Start	End	Congress	Image	Member	Party	Electoral history	Seats eliminated			
=== Camarines Norte's at-large district for the House of Representatives of the Philippines ===								Seats eliminated			
9	May 25, 1946	December 30, 1953	1st		Esmeraldo Eco	Young Philippines	Elected in 1946.	Seats eliminated			
9	May 25, 1946	December 30, 1953	2nd		Esmeraldo Eco	Liberal	Re-elected in 1949.	Seats eliminated			
10	December 30, 1953	December 30, 1957	3rd		Fernando V. Pajarillo	Nacionalista	Elected in 1953.	Seats eliminated			
11	December 30, 1957	December 30, 1961	4th		Pedro A. Venida	Young Philippines	Elected in 1957.	Seats eliminated			
12	December 30, 1961	December 30, 1965	5th		Marcial R. Pimentel	Liberal	Elected in 1961.	Seats eliminated			
(10)	December 30, 1965	September 23, 1972	6th		Fernando V. Pajarillo	Nacionalista	Elected in 1965.	Seats eliminated			
(10)	December 30, 1965	September 23, 1972	7th		Fernando V. Pajarillo	Nacionalista	Re-elected in 1969. Removed from office after imposition of martial law.	Seats eliminated			
District dissolved into the twelve-seat Region V's at-large district for the Interim Batasang Pambansa.								Seats eliminated			
#	Term of office		Batasang Pambansa	Single seat				Seats eliminated			
#	Start	End	Batasang Pambansa	Image	Member	Party	Electoral history	Seats eliminated			
=== Camarines Norte's at-large district for the Regular Batasang Pambansa ===								Seats eliminated			
District re-created February 1, 1984.								Seats eliminated			
13	July 23, 1984	March 25, 1986	2nd		Roy Padilla Sr.	UNIDO	Elected in 1984.	Seats eliminated			
#	Term of office		Congress	Single seat				Seats eliminated			
#	Start	End	Congress	Image	Member	Party	Electoral history	Seats eliminated			
=== Camarines Norte's at-large district for the House of Representatives of the Philippines ===								Seats eliminated			
District re-created February 2, 1987.								Seats eliminated			
14	June 30, 1987	June 30, 1992	8th		Renato M. Unico	PDP–Laban	Elected in 1987.	Seats eliminated			
15	June 30, 1992	June 30, 1998	9th		Emmanuel B. Pimentel	Lakas	Elected in 1992.	Seats eliminated			
15	June 30, 1992	June 30, 1998	10th		Emmanuel B. Pimentel	Lakas	Re-elected in 1995.	Seats eliminated			
16	June 30, 1998	June 30, 2001	11th		Roy A. Padilla Jr.	NPC (LAMMP)	Elected in 1998.	Seats eliminated			
17	June 30, 2001	June 30, 2007	12th		Renato J. Unico Jr.	Lakas	Elected in 2001.	Seats eliminated			
17	June 30, 2001	June 30, 2007	13th		Renato J. Unico Jr.	Lakas	Re-elected in 2004.	Seats eliminated			
18	June 30, 2007	June 30, 2010	14th		Liwayway Vinzons-Chato	Liberal	Elected in 2007.	Seats eliminated			
District dissolved into Camarines Norte's 1st and 2nd districts.								Seats eliminated			

== See also ==
- Legislative districts of Camarines Norte
