= Talisay, Camarines Norte =

Municipality in Camarines Norte, Philippines

Talisay
- Municipality
- Municipality of Talisay
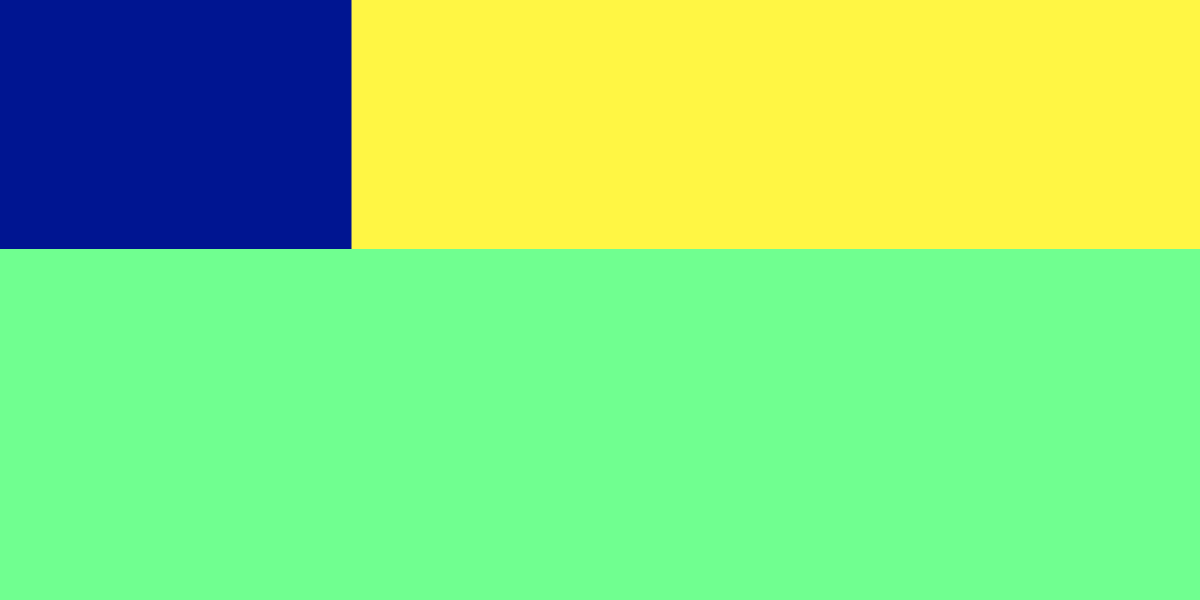
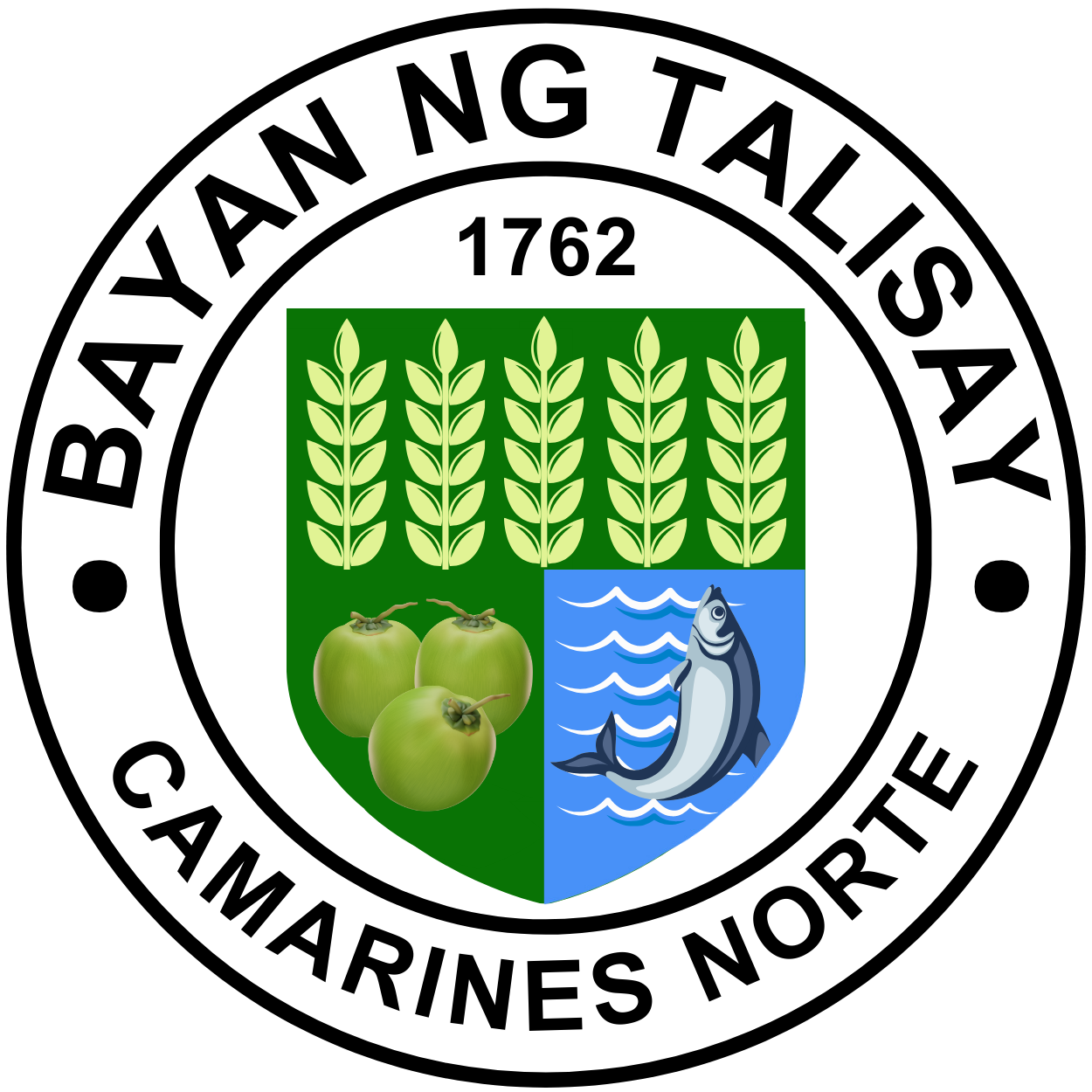
- Flag Seal
- Motto(s): "Luntiang Talisay, Ani ay Tagumpay" (A Green Talisay, the Crop of Success)
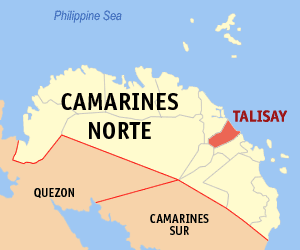
- Map of Camarines Norte with Talisay highlighted
- Interactive map of Talisay
- Location within the Philippines
- Coordinates: 14°08′08″N 122°55′28″E
- Country: Philippines
- Region: Bicol Region
- Province: Camarines Norte
- District: 2nd district
- Founded: 1908
- Barangays: 15 (see Barangays)

Government
  - Type: Sangguniang Bayan
  - Mayor: Donovan A. Mancenido
  - Vice Mayor: Juancho Z. Ramores
  - Representative: Rosemarie Panotes
  - Municipal Council: Members: Mitch L. Abuyo; Jeanalyn B. Aguilar; Jerry P. Abuyo; Leticia V. Ibita; Randy E. Abante; Nelmar A. Defeo; Erlinda N. De Leon; Alan A. Orendain; Rolando A. Ubana (LNB ex-officio); Jan Eddie Manlangit (SKF ex-officio)
  - Electorate: 18,147 voters (2025)

Area
  - Total: 30.76 km^{2} (11.88 sq mi)
- Elevation: 12 m (39 ft)
- Highest elevation: 78 m (256 ft)
- Lowest elevation: −1 m (−3.3 ft)

Population (2024 census)
  - Total: 26,371
  - Density: 857.3/km^{2} (2,220/sq mi)
  - Households: 6,430
- Demonym: Talisaynon

Economy
  - Income class: 4th municipal income class
  - Poverty incidence: 27.3% (2023)
  - Revenue: ₱ 131.3 million (2024)
  - Assets: ₱ 638.1 million (2024)
  - Expenditure: ₱ 140.8 million (2024)
  - Liabilities: ₱ 133.6 million (2024)

Service provider
  - Electricity: Camarines Norte Electric Cooperative (CANORECO)
- Time zone: UTC+8 (PST)
- ZIP code: 4602
- PSGC: 0501611000
- IDD : area code: +63 (0)54
- Native languages: Central Bikol; Tagalog

Talisay, officially the Municipality of Talisay (Tagalog: Bayan ng Talisay), is a municipality in the province of Camarines Norte, Philippines. According to the 2024 census, it has a population of 26,371 people.

== Etymology ==
Local tradition attributes the name "Talisay" (or "Tarisay") to an encounter between Spanish explorers and a native resident. While searching for gold in the area, the Spaniards asked a local for the name of the place. Misunderstanding the question, the local responded "Talisay", referring to a type of tree (Terminalia catappa) abundant in the area. The Spaniards adopted the name, and it has remained ever since.

== History ==
The history of Talisay, Camarines Norte, is closely linked to early Spanish missionary efforts in the region. Initially known as "Tarisay," the town was established as a visita (a satellite settlement) under Daet in 1654. This period marked the expansion of Franciscan missionaries, who had arrived in Daet in 1583 to spread Christianity across the Bicol region.

=== Spanish Colonial Period (16th–19th Century) ===
By the late 16th and early 17th centuries, Talisay was under the ecclesiastical jurisdiction of the Franciscans. However, due to a shortage of clergy, Daet and its visitas—including Talisay—struggled to maintain consistent religious leadership. By the mid-17th century, the administration of these areas was transferred from the Franciscan order to the secular clergy.

During this period, Talisay continued to grow while remaining tied to the Spanish colonial structure. The town primarily thrived through rice cultivation, which became its major economic activity. By the 19th century, Talisay had developed into a more established settlement, mirroring the urbanization trends of Daet and other nearby communities.

=== World War II and Historical Landmarks ===
Talisay played a role during World War II, with local resistance movements fighting against Japanese forces. Today, a small memorial in town stands in honor of its World War II veterans and heroes.

Another notable historical site is the St. Francis of Assisi Parish Church, which dates back to the Spanish period. Due to its age and traditional construction, it serves as a landmark reflecting the town’s colonial past.

=== Modern Talisay ===
Today, Talisay continues to be known for its agricultural contributions, particularly rice production. While it has grown into a distinct community over the centuries, its history remains deeply intertwined with Spanish missionary efforts, colonial governance, and the resilience of its people.

== Geography ==
Talisay is a landlocked municipality located in Camarines Norte, within the Bicol Region of the Philippines. Talisay is bordered by Vinzons to the northwest, Daet to the southeast, and San Vicente to the southwest. While it is near coastal towns like Vinzons and Mercedes. While it is near coastal towns, Talisay itself is primarily an agricultural community rather than a coastal one.

Talisay is 4 kilometres (2.5 mi) from Daet and 338 kilometres (210 mi) from Manila.

The town’s topography is mostly flat, with some gently rolling hills in the inland areas. Rice fields dominate the landscape, reflecting its agricultural economy, while rivers and waterways provide essential irrigation. Unlike its neighboring municipalities, which have direct access to the sea, Talisay's economy is centered around farming rather than fishing.

Talisay has a tropical monsoon climate, characterized by heavy rainfall from June to December and a dry season from January to May. As part of the Pacific typhoon belt, it is vulnerable to strong storms and floods, which can affect farming and infrastructure. Despite these challenges, the town remains resilient, with its agriculture playing a crucial role in sustaining its local economy.

Due to its farmlands and farming traditions, Talisay acts as a rural agricultural town. The Paruyan Festival celebrates the long history of the areas' connection to rice farming, celebrating its identity as one of the province’s many agricultural communities.

=== Barangay ===
Talisay is politically subdivided into 15 barangays. Each barangay consists of puroks and some have sitios.

- Binanuaan
- Caawigan
- Cahabaan
- Calintaan
- Del Carmen
- Gabon
- Itomang
- Poblacion
- San Francisco
- San Isidro
- San Jose
- San Nicolas
- Santa Cruz
- Santa Elena
- Santo Niño

=== Climate ===
Climate data for Talisay, Camarines Norte
Month	Jan	Feb	Mar	Apr	May	Jun	Jul	Aug	Sep	Oct	Nov	Dec	Year
Mean daily maximum °C (°F)	27 (81)	27 (81)	29 (84)	31 (88)	31 (88)	30 (86)	29 (84)	29 (84)	29 (84)	29 (84)	28 (82)	27 (81)	29 (84)
Mean daily minimum °C (°F)	22 (72)	22 (72)	22 (72)	23 (73)	25 (77)	25 (77)	25 (77)	24 (75)	24 (75)	24 (75)	24 (75)	23 (73)	24 (74)
Average precipitation mm (inches)	85 (3.3)	55 (2.2)	53 (2.1)	47 (1.9)	112 (4.4)	156 (6.1)	213 (8.4)	159 (6.3)	201 (7.9)	216 (8.5)	197 (7.8)	141 (5.6)	1,635 (64.5)
Average rainy days	15.4	11.6	13.6	12.3	19.9	23.7	27.3	26.0	26.0	24.6	21.8	19.1	241.3
Source: Meteoblue

== Demographics ==
Population census of Talisay
Year	Pop.	±% p.a.
1903	3,684	—
1918	5,222	+2.35%
1939	5,671	+0.39%
1948	6,843	+2.11%
1960	8,539	+1.86%
1970	12,042	+3.49%
1975	13,328	+2.06%
1980	13,869	+0.80%
1990	16,896	+1.99%
1995	17,841	+1.02%
2000	21,509	+4.09%
2007	22,942	+0.89%
2010	23,904	+1.51%
2015	25,841	+1.49%
2020	27,244	+1.12%
2024	26,371	−0.78%
Source: Philippine Statistics Authority

In the 2024 census, the population of Talisay was 26,371 people, with a density of 860 inhabitants per square kilometre or 2,200 inhabitants per square mile.

=== Religion ===
==== Roman Catholicism ====
The local church of Talisay, the Parish Church of St. Francis of Assisi is under the Diocese of Daet. The parish has various chapels located in each of the barangays.

Initially established as a visita (ca. 1654-1657), it was administered and under the missionaries, the parish was later under the Archdiocese of Cáceres until the establishment of the suffragan Diocese of Daet in 1974.

The local church today is prevalent in the public life of Talisay, bringing pastoral programs accessible to the laity and occasionally holding Masses and processions in the town during various festivities throughout the liturgical year.

==== Other Christian Faiths ====
There are two local chapels of the Iglesia ni Cristo, the largest of which is situated along the national highway.

The Seventh-day Adventists have a local church along the road towards Brgy. San Jose.

The Church of Jesus Christ of Latter Day Saints have a local congregation near the town market.

==== Other Religions ====
Muslims have established a mosque in 2025, situated adjacent to the local chapel of Brgy. Santa Elena.

== Economy ==
Poverty incidence of Talisay (%)

Source: Philippine Statistics Authority

Just a neighboring town of Daet, Talisay is often seen as a suburb of Daet due to its proximity to the town. Many warehouses have opened in the town.

The fertile soil, topography (averaging about 10 metres (33 ft) above sea-level) and suitable climate are the main reasons why agriculture is the economic backbone of the town. Rice and coconut farming are the major agricultural activities for most of the barangays and fishing is the second thriving industry particularly in the coastal barangays.

== Government ==
The incumbent mayor is Dondon Mancenido.

== Culture ==
The municipality is known to hold the annual Paruyan Festival culminating with the Feast of St. Francis of Assisi, commemorating the farming culture of the municipality. Various competitions, particularly a singing competition held at the town plaza a month and a half before the festival during every Saturday evenings.

The town is also known for the Triathlons that is conducted during the celebration of the Bantayog Festival, where it is dubbed by the regional tourism department as the "Bicolandia's Toughest Triathlon".

== Education ==
The Talisay Schools District Office governs all educational institutions within the municipality. It oversees the management and operations of all private and public, from primary to secondary schools.

Talisay has programs and facilities for education. The municipality created successful professionals in various fields such as medicine, law, engineering, architecture, education, law enforcement and military service, banking, business, sports, entertainment, marketing, etc.

=== Primary and elementary schools ===
- Cahabaan Elementary School
- F. David Integrated School (converted as an Integrated School as of S.Y. 2026-2027)
- Gabon Elementary School
- M. Cacho Elementary School
- Ramon Magsaysay Elementary School
- San Isidro Elementary School
- Sta. Cruz Elementary School
- Sta. Elena Elementary School
- Talisay Elementary School
- Zantua-Abordo Elementary School

=== Secondary schools ===
- Gonzales-Azcutia High School
- Lazaro Cabezudo High School
- San Francisco National High School
- St. Francis Parochial School
- F. David Integrated School (As part of the transitional period from being an Elementary School, only Grades 7 and Grade 11 are available, as of S.Y. 2026-2027)

=== Higher educational institution ===
- Camarines Norte School of Law

== Notable personalities ==
- Joross Gamboa - actor, comedian, and model
