= Marisol Panotes =

Filipino politician (1949–2022)

The Honorable Marisol Panotes

Member of the Philippine House of Representatives from Camarines Norte's 2nd District
- In office June 30, 2016 – April 29, 2022
- Preceded by: Elmer Panotes
- Succeeded by: Rosemarie Panotes

Personal details
- Born: January 20, 1946 Daet, Camarines Norte, Philippines
- Died: April 29, 2022 (aged 76) Camarines Norte, Philippines
- Party: PDP-Laban
- Other political affiliations: Liberal (2015-2016)
- Spouse: Elmer Panotes (died 2015)
- Children: 1
- Education: University of the East (BA, BS, LLB)
- Occupation: Politician

Marisol Conejos Panotes (January 20, 1946 – April 29, 2022), also known as Ate Toots Panotes, was a Filipina politician who served as Congresswoman in Camarines Norte's 2nd District from 2016 until her death in 2022.

Panotes was a graduate of the University of the East in Manila. Before entering politics, she was a legal assistant of the Federation of the Free Workers and later the researcher and general manager of Panotes Law and Accounting Office.

Panotes died on April 30, 2022, at the age of 76.
