= Camarines Norte's 2nd congressional district =

Legislative district of the Philippines

- Constituency for the House of Representatives of the Philippines
- Map of Camarines Norte showing the location of its 2nd district

- Location of city/province within the Philippines
- Province: Camarines Norte
- Region: Bicol Region
- Population: 316,789 (2020)
- Electorate: 192,543 (2022)
- Major settlements: 7 LGUs: Municipalities; Basud; Daet; Mercedes; San Lorenzo Ruiz; San Vicente; Talisay; Vinzons

Current constituency
- Created: 2009
- Representative: Rosemarie Panotes
- Political party: Lakas–CMD
- Congressional bloc: Majority

Camarines Norte's 2nd congressional district is one of the two congressional districts of the Philippines in Camarines Norte. It has been represented in the House of Representatives of the Philippines since 2010. Previously included in Camarines Norte's at-large congressional district, it includes the eastern half of the province, bordering Camarines Sur. It is currently represented in the 20th Congress by Rosemarie Panotes of the Lakas–CMD.

== Representation history ==
#	Image	Member	Term of office		Congress	Party	Electoral history	Constituent LGUs
#	Image	Member	Start	End	Congress	Party	Electoral history	Constituent LGUs
District created October 22, 2009 from Camarines Norte's at-large district.
1		Elmer Panotes	June 30, 2010	September 16, 2015	15th	Lakas	Elected in 2010.	2010–present: Basud, Daet, Mercedes, San Lorenzo Ruiz, San Vicente, Talisay, Vinzons
1		Elmer Panotes	June 30, 2010	September 16, 2015	16th	Lakas	Re-elected in 2013. Died in office.	2010–present: Basud, Daet, Mercedes, San Lorenzo Ruiz, San Vicente, Talisay, Vinzons
—	vacant		September 16, 2015	June 30, 2016	16th	–	No special election held to fill vacancy.	2010–present: Basud, Daet, Mercedes, San Lorenzo Ruiz, San Vicente, Talisay, Vinzons
2		Marisol C. Panotes	June 30, 2016	April 29, 2022	17th	PDP–Laban	Elected in 2016.	2010–present: Basud, Daet, Mercedes, San Lorenzo Ruiz, San Vicente, Talisay, Vinzons
2		Marisol C. Panotes	June 30, 2016	April 29, 2022	18th	PDP–Laban	Re-elected in 2019. Died in office.	2010–present: Basud, Daet, Mercedes, San Lorenzo Ruiz, San Vicente, Talisay, Vinzons
—	vacant		April 29, 2022	June 30, 2022	18th	–	No special election held to fill vacancy.	2010–present: Basud, Daet, Mercedes, San Lorenzo Ruiz, San Vicente, Talisay, Vinzons
3		Rosemarie C. Panotes	June 30, 2022	Incumbent	19th	Lakas	Elected in 2022.	2010–present: Basud, Daet, Mercedes, San Lorenzo Ruiz, San Vicente, Talisay, Vinzons
3		Rosemarie C. Panotes	June 30, 2022	Incumbent	20th	Lakas	Re-elected in 2025.	2010–present: Basud, Daet, Mercedes, San Lorenzo Ruiz, San Vicente, Talisay, Vinzons

== Election results ==
=== 2010 ===
2010 Philippine House of Representatives elections at Camarines Norte's 2nd district
Party	Candidate	Votes	%
Lakas–Kampi	Elmer Panotes	51,704	50.56
Liberal	Liwayway Vinzons-Chato	47,823	46.77
Independent	Donald Asis	3,734	3.65
Total votes		103,261	100.00
Lakas–Kampi win (new seat)			

=== 2013 ===
2013 Philippine House of Representatives elections at Camarines Norte's 2nd district
Party	Candidate	Votes	%
Lakas	Elmer Panotes	53,700	52.12
Liberal	Liwayway Vinzons-Chato	31,197	30.28
Independent	Ruth Herrera	7,485	7.26
Margin of victory		22,503	21.84%
Invalid or blank votes		10,649	10.34
Total votes		103,031	100.00
Lakas hold			

=== 2016 ===
2016 Philippine House of Representatives elections at Camarines Norte's 2nd district
Party	Candidate	Votes	%
Liberal	Marisol Panotes	54,406	
NPC	Liwayway Vinzons-Chato	45,414	
Nacionalista	Senen Jerez	12,695	
Independent	Donald Asis	2,019	
Independent	Reynante Napao	360	
Independent	Romeo Balmeo	230	
Invalid or blank votes		14,615	
Total votes		129,739	
Liberal gain from Lakas			

=== 2019 ===
2019 Philippine House of Representatives elections at Camarines Norte's 2nd district
Party	Candidate	Votes	%
PDP–Laban	Marisol Panotes	86,075	66.40
NUP	Liwayway Vinzons-Chato	41,862	45.22
Independent	Donald Asis	1,677	1.29
Valid ballots		129,614	90.89
Invalid or blank votes		12992	9.11
Total votes		142,606	100%
PDP–Laban hold			

=== 2022 ===
2022 Philippine House of Representatives elections at Camarines Norte's 2nd district
Party	Candidate	Votes	%
PDP–Laban	Rosemarie Panotes	96,270	62.15
Lakas	"Kuya" Jojo Unico	58,640	37.94
Total votes		154,910	100%
PDP–Laban hold			

=== 2025 ===
Candidate	Party	Votes	%
Rosemarie Panotes (incumbent)	Lakas–CMD	122,393	77.24
Concon Panotes	Nationalist People's Coalition	33,828	21.35
Ninoy Ferrer	Independent	2,239	1.41
Total		158,460	100.00
Valid votes		158,460	92.54
Invalid/blank votes		12,775	7.46
Total votes		171,235	100.00
Registered voters/turnout		200,276	85.50
Lakas–CMD hold			
Source: Commission on Elections

== See also ==
- Legislative districts of Camarines Norte
