= Liwayway Vinzons-Chato =

Filipino lawyer and politician (born 1945)

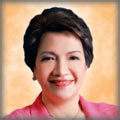

Member of the Philippine House of Representatives from Camarines Norte's at-large district
- In office June 30, 2007 – June 30, 2010
- Preceded by: Renato Unico Jr.
- Succeeded by: District divided

Commissioner of the Bureau of Internal Revenue
- In office May 18, 1993 – July 1, 1998
- Preceded by: Jose U. Ong
- Succeeded by: Beethoven Rualo

Personal details
- Born: Liwayway Pimentel Vinzons; December 31, 1945 (age 80)
- Party: NUP (2018–present)
- Other political affiliations: NPC (2015–2018); Liberal (2007–2015); Reporma (2001-2007)
- Education: University of the Philippines Diliman (LL.B)

Liwayway Pimentel Vinzons-Chato (born December 31, 1945) is a Filipino lawyer and politician. She was elected as a Member of the House of Representatives, representing the Lone District of Camarines Norte from 2007 to 2010.

A graduate of the University of the Philippines College of Law, Vinzons-Chato served as Commissioner of the Bureau of Internal Revenue during the administration of President Fidel Ramos. In 2001, she was an unsuccessful candidate for election to the Philippine Senate under Reporma-LM and the banner of the People Power Coalition allied with President Gloria Macapagal Arroyo.

In 2007, she ran for representative for Camarines Norte and won. She lost re-election in 2010 when she ran for the newly established 2nd district. She also lost for the same position in 2016 and in 2019.

House of Representatives of the Philippines
Preceded by Renato J. Unico Jr.	Representative, Lone District of Camarines Norte; 2007–2010	District dissolved
