= San Lorenzo Ruiz, Camarines Norte =

Municipality in Camarines Norte, Philippines

San Lorenzo Ruiz Imelda
- Municipality
- Municipality of San Lorenzo Ruiz
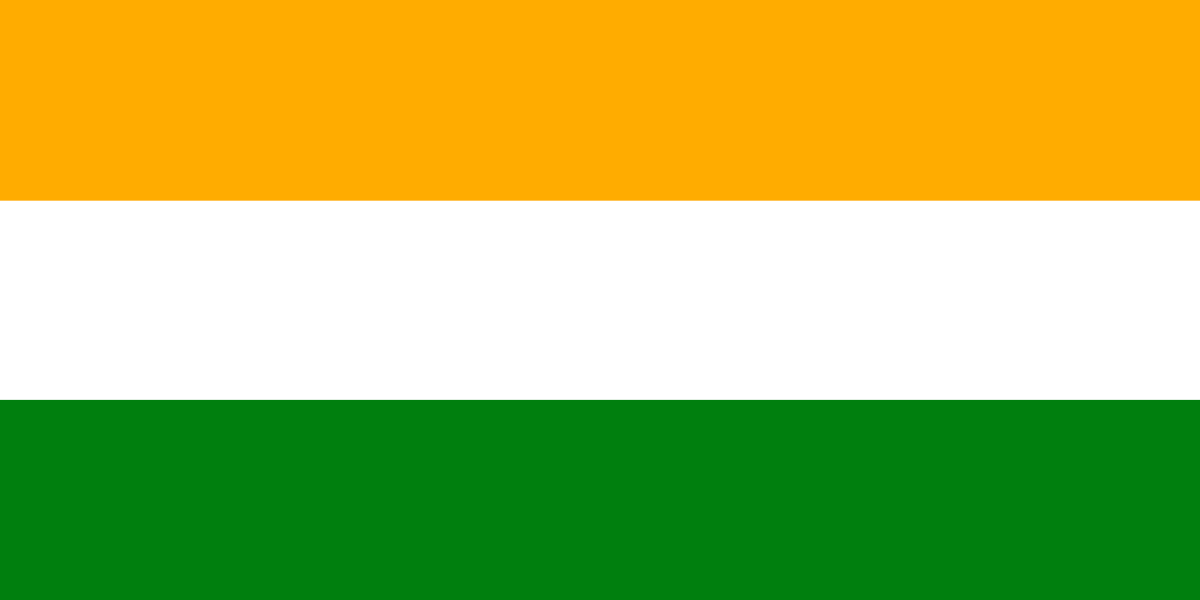
- Flag

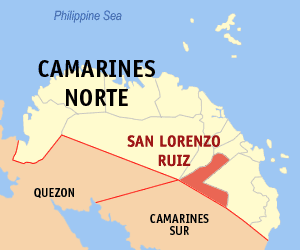
- Map of Camarines Norte with San Lorenzo Ruiz highlighted
- Interactive map of San Lorenzo Ruiz
- Location within the Philippines
- Coordinates: 14°02′21″N 122°52′06″E
- Country: Philippines
- Region: Bicol Region
- Province: Camarines Norte
- District: 2nd district
- Founded: November 9, 1970
- Renamed: February 10, 1989
- Named for: San Lorenzo Ruiz
- Barangays: 12 (see Barangays)

Government
  - Type: Sangguniang Bayan
  - Mayor: Nelson P. delos Santos
  - Vice Mayor: Arnulfo D. Bacuño
  - Representative: Rosemarie C. Panotes
  - Municipal Council: Members: Julio F. Estravez; Restituta B. Nagera; Rey Mar T. Macale; Allan M. Quibral; Amiel Z. Guinto; Felix A. Quibral; Roderick A. Jovelo; Jesus S. Patricio
  - Electorate: 11,501 voters (2025)

Area
  - Total: 119.37 km^{2} (46.09 sq mi)
- Elevation: 219 m (719 ft)
- Highest elevation: 947 m (3,107 ft)
- Lowest elevation: 35 m (115 ft)

Population (2024 census)
  - Total: 15,072
  - Density: 126.26/km^{2} (327.02/sq mi)
  - Households: 3,629

Economy
  - Income class: 5th municipal income class
  - Poverty incidence: 25.69% (2023)
  - Revenue: ₱ 121.9 million (2024)
  - Assets: ₱ 47.49 million (2024)
  - Expenditure: ₱ 92.92 million (2024)
  - Liabilities: ₱ 45.13 million (2024)

Service provider
  - Electricity: Camarines Norte Electric Cooperative (CANORECO)
- Time zone: UTC+8 (PST)
- ZIP code: 4610
- PSGC: 0501604000
- IDD : area code: +63 (0)54
- Native languages: Central Bikol; Tagalog; Manide
- Patron saint: San Lorenzo Ruiz

San Lorenzo Ruiz, officially the Municipality of San Lorenzo Ruiz (Central Bikol: Banwaan kan San Lorenzo Ruiz; Tagalog: Bayan ng San Lorenzo Ruiz), is a municipality in the province of Camarines Norte, Philippines. According to the 2024 census, it has a population of 15,072 people.

== Etymology ==
On February 10, 1989, the Municipality of Imelda was renamed, in honor of San Lorenzo Ruiz, the first Filipino saint venerated in the Roman Catholic Church, canonized on October 18, 1987.

== History ==
In 1970, the Municipality of Imelda was established by virture of Republic Act 6144, constituting the barrios Daculangbolo, Laniton, Langga, Maisog, Dagotdotan, Mampurog, Matacong, in the Municipality of Daet, and San Isidro, San Antonio, San Ramon, Manlimonsito, Salvacion in the Municipality of Basud.

In 2017, five town centers were burned which include the municipal hall, municipal trial court, office building of Department of Interior and Local Government, local police station, and the office of Commission on Elections.

== Geography ==
=== Barangays ===
San Lorenzo Ruiz is politically subdivided into 12 barangays. Each barangay consists of puroks and some have sitios.

- Daculang Bolo
- Dagotdotan
- Langga
- Laniton
- Maisog
- Mampurog
- Manlimonsito
- Matacong (Poblacion)
- Salvacion
- San Antonio
- San Isidro
- San Ramon

=== Climate ===
Climate data for San Lorenzo Ruiz, Camarines Norte
Month	Jan	Feb	Mar	Apr	May	Jun	Jul	Aug	Sep	Oct	Nov	Dec	Year
Mean daily maximum °C (°F)	26 (79)	26 (79)	28 (82)	30 (86)	30 (86)	29 (84)	28 (82)	28 (82)	28 (82)	28 (82)	27 (81)	26 (79)	28 (82)
Mean daily minimum °C (°F)	22 (72)	21 (70)	22 (72)	22 (72)	24 (75)	24 (75)	24 (75)	24 (75)	24 (75)	23 (73)	23 (73)	22 (72)	23 (73)
Average precipitation mm (inches)	85 (3.3)	55 (2.2)	53 (2.1)	47 (1.9)	112 (4.4)	156 (6.1)	213 (8.4)	159 (6.3)	201 (7.9)	216 (8.5)	197 (7.8)	141 (5.6)	1,635 (64.5)
Average rainy days	15.4	11.6	13.6	12.3	19.9	23.7	27.3	26.0	26.0	24.6	21.8	19.1	241.3
Source: Meteoblue

== Demographics ==
Population census of San Lorenzo Ruiz
Year	Pop.	±% p.a.
1980	8,859	—
1990	9,286	+0.47%
1995	10,811	+2.89%
2000	11,678	+1.67%
2007	12,299	+0.72%
2010	12,592	+0.86%
2015	14,063	+2.13%
2020	15,757	+2.42%
2024	15,072	−1.06%
Source: Philippine Statistics Authority

In the 2024 census, the population of San Lorenzo Ruiz was 15,072 people with a density of 130 inhabitants per square kilometre or 340 inhabitants per square mile.

== Economy ==
Poverty incidence of San Lorenzo Ruiz (%)

Source: Philippine Statistics Authority

== Tourism ==
Waterfalls

- Nacali Falls - Barangay Maisog
- Nakawa Falls - Barangay Maisog
- Angelina Falls - San Isidro
- Nabangko Falls - Barangay San Isidro
- Ibatan Falls - Barangay San Isidro

Matacong Zipline

It is the longest zipline in the whole Bicol region located in Barangay Matacong. The zipline is 750 meters long and is managed by the Local Government Unit (LGU) of San Lorenzo Ruiz. San Lorenzo Ruiz is aiming to become an Eco-Adventure town and the zipline is the start of their plans to add more facilities in the area to increase adventure sports like rappelling, water tubing, trekking, all-terrain vehicle ride and many more.

Canyoning and River Trekking

The Mampurog River have several meters of canyons and deep part of river that is suitable for canyoning activities. Canyoning is frequently done in remote and rugged settings and often requires navigational, route-finding and other wilderness travel skills.

Canyoneering and Bouldering

On April 9, 2017, five explorers from Camarines Norte was given a permit by Nelson P. Delos Santos (Municipal Mayor) and Mr. Manuel Racho (Municipal Tourism Officer) to explore the Nacali Falls river and mampurog river as part of their dream to create a comprehensive list of waterfalls and different natural attractions in the province. One member of the team, Mr. Benjie S. Ilagan is a resident of Barangay Mampurog and has visited Nacali Falls for more than five times. The other members of the team are as follows: Mr. Kim as the team leader and navigator; Mr. Chris A. Camus the scribe; Mr. Gilbert Parale the timer and Mr. Jossiah Nathaniel M. Parena, aspiring to become a mountaineer and the youngest member of the group. A preliminary exploration was conducted prior to the actual exploration for the preparation and planning of the team. The team was surprised to see several meters of canyons and deep part of river that is suitable for canyoning Activities. The waterfalls can also be used for rappelling activities. The team also saw different waterfalls created by the big boulders present in the river. After six hours of river trekking and canyoning from the Nacali Falls river junction, the team found out that due to the limited time of the exploration, Mampurog river was not reached. Thus, the team recommends to the municipal Mayor and the tourism officer to allow them to explore the place in the future.

== Flora ==
The recent discovery of a R. manillana haven in Mt. Guinatungan, a lesser-known mountain in Camarines Norte, Philippines, not only provided additional locality of distribution, but also resulted to better understanding of the taxonomic complexity of the Rafflesia species. While available literatures cite Rafflesia as critically endangered, it seems otherwise in Camarines Norte. A recent Rafflesia expedition showed significant populations of this species. This situation calls for a multi-agency approach in management and actions integrating research and development that are focused on the conservation and protection not only of the species but more importantly its host and habitat.

== Education ==
The San Vicente-San Lorenzo Ruiz Schools District Office governs all educational institutions within the municipality. It oversees the management and operations of all private and public, from primary to secondary schools.

=== Primary and elementary schools ===
- Bernardo Olis Elementary School
- Cabanbanan Elementary School
- L. Opeda Elementary School
- San Vicente Central School
- San Vicente Parochial School
- Sola Gracia Christian School
- V. Orendain Elementary School
- V. Ricafrente Elementary School

=== Secondary schools ===
- Fabrica High School
- Froilan D. Lopez High School
