= Rosemarie Panotes =

Filipino politician

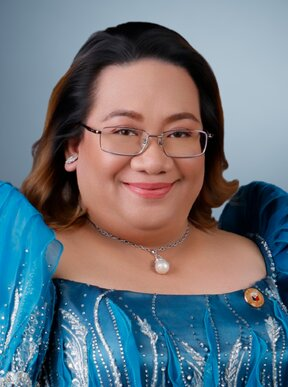
- Official portrait, 2025

Member of the Philippine House of Representatives from Camarines Norte's 2nd district
- Incumbent
- Assumed office June 30, 2022
- Preceded by: Marisol Panotes

Personal details
- Born: Rosemarie Conejos Panotes; January 18, 1985 (age 41) Daet, Camarines Norte, Philippines
- Party: Lakas (2023–present)
- Other party: PDP–Laban (2021–2023)
- Parent(s): Elmer Panotes (father); Marisol Panotes (mother)
- Occupation: Politician
- Profession: Public servant
- Website: https://congresswomanrosemariepanotes.vercel.app/

Rosemarie Conejos Panotes (born January 18, 1985) is a Filipina politician serving as the representative of Camarines Norte's 2nd congressional district in the House of Representatives of the Philippines since 2022. She is the daughter of former representatives Elmer Panotes and Marisol Panotes.

== Early life and education ==
Panotes was born on January 18, 1985, in Daet, Camarines Norte. She is the only child of former Daet mayor and district representative Elmer Panotes and Marisol Conejos Panotes, who also represented the 2nd district of Camarines Norte until her death in 2022.

== Career ==
Before entering politics, Panotes worked as Chief Political Affairs Officer in the office of her late mother, Marisol Panotes, which exposed her to lawmaking and public policy.

She successfully ran in the 2022 elections to continue her family's political legacy in Camarines Norte.

Since being elected, she has authored bills focused on assisting marginalized sectors. Among her notable measures is legislation empowering municipalities and cities outside Metro Manila to designate tricycle lanes on public roads and highways to ensure road safety.

== Committee assignments ==
In the 19th Congress, Panotes served as:

- Vice Chairperson, Committee on Basic Education and Culture
- Vice Chairperson, Committee on Labor and Employment
