= Camarines Norte =

Province in Bicol, Philippines

- Province
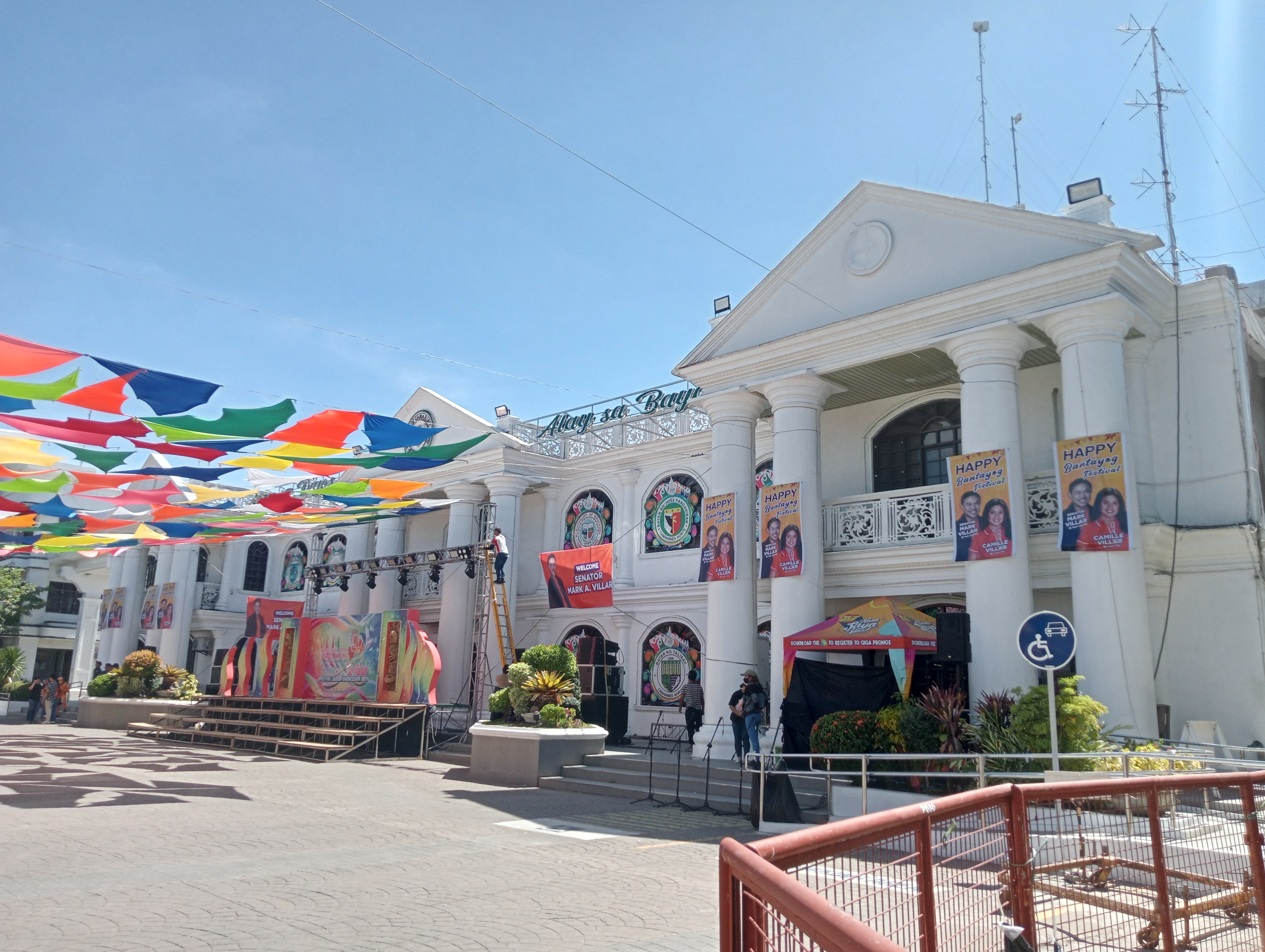
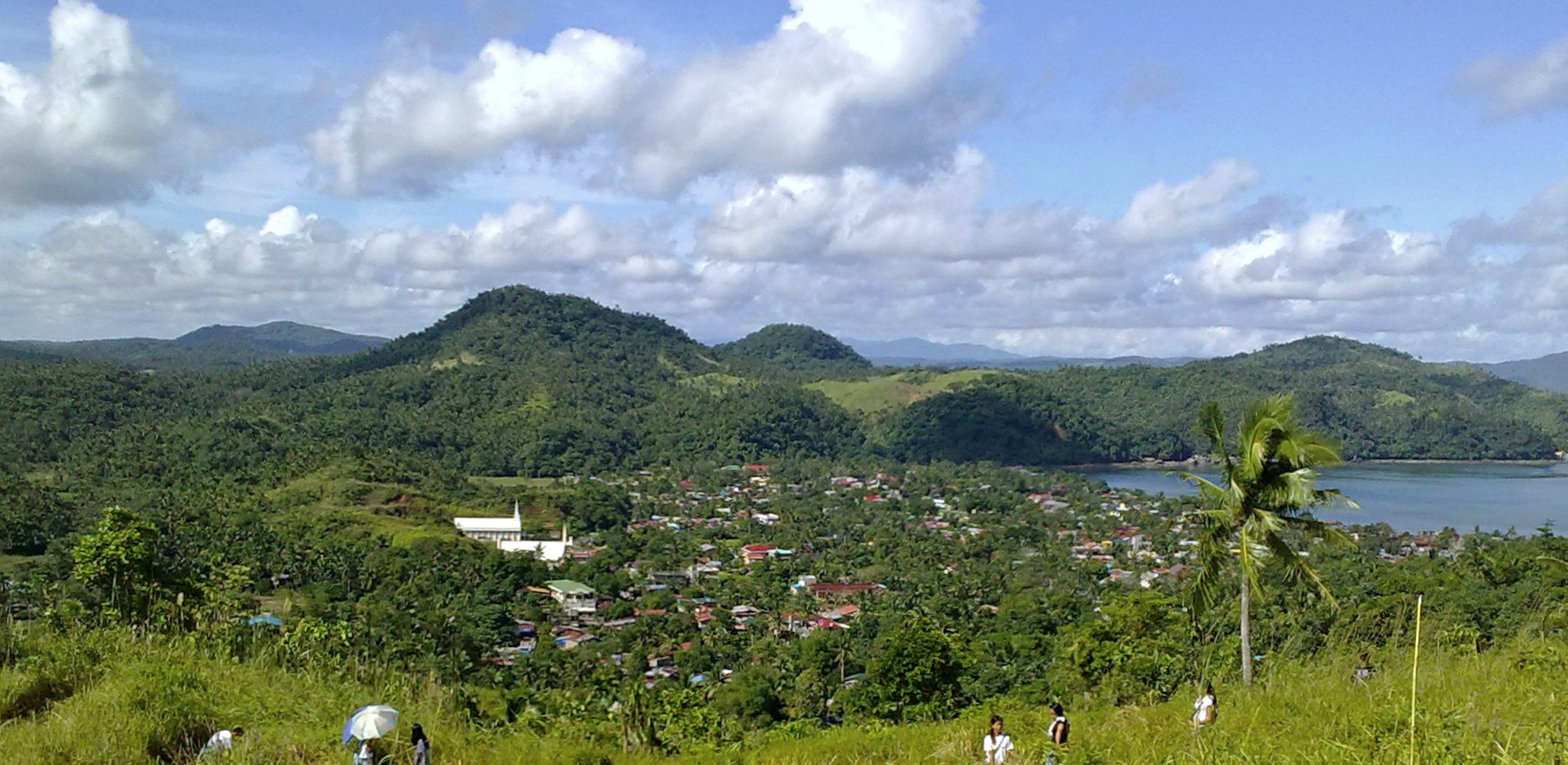
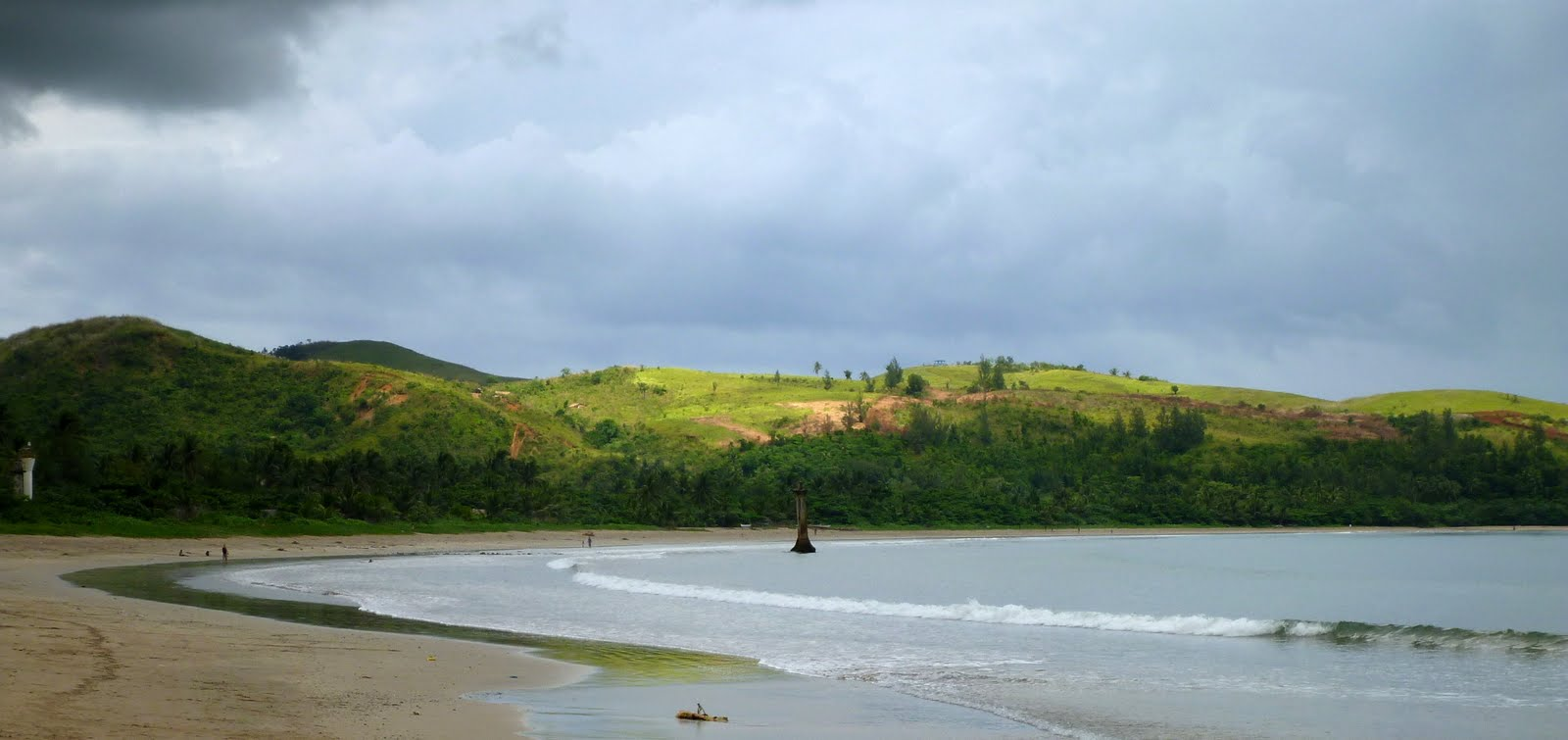
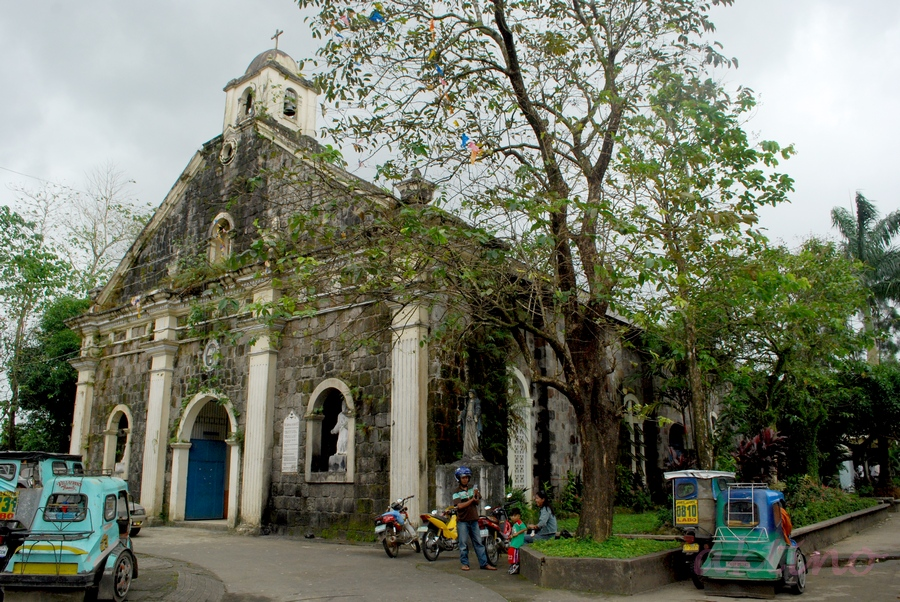
- (from top: left to right) Camarines Norte Provincial Capitol, Jose Panganiban, Paracale beach and Labo Church.

- Flag Seal
- Anthem: Camarines Norte Hymn / "Lupang Payapa"
- Location in the Philippines
- Interactive map of Camarines Norte
- Coordinates: 14°10′N 122°45′E
- Country: Philippines
- Region: Bicol Region
- Founded: 1829
- Capital: Daet
- Largest Municipality: Labo

Government
  - Governor: Ricarte R. Padilla (PFP)
  - Vice Governor: Joseph V. Ascutia (Liberal)
  - Legislature: Camarines Norte Provincial Board
  - Electorate: 396,583 voters (2025)

Area
  - Total: 2,320.07 km^{2} (895.78 sq mi)
  - Rank: 55th out of 82
- Highest elevation (Mount Labo): 1,544 m (5,066 ft)

Population (2024 census)
  - Total: 604,666
  - Rank: 51st out of 82
  - Density: 260.624/km^{2} (675.013/sq mi)
  - Rank: 36th out of 82
  - Households: 144,155
- Demonyms: Camarinesnon; Camarinesense; Camnorteňo

Divisions
  - Independent cities: 0
  - Component cities: 0
  - Municipalities: 12: Basud; Capalonga; Daet; Jose Panganiban; Labo; Mercedes; Paracale; San Lorenzo Ruiz; San Vicente; Santa Elena; Talisay; Vinzons
  - Barangays: 282
  - Districts: Legislative districts of Camarines Norte

Economy
  - Income class: 1st provincial income class
  - Poverty incidence: 17.7% (2023)
  - Revenue: ₱ 2,934 million (2024)
  - Assets: ₱ 8,739 million (2024)
  - Expenditure: ₱ 2,784 million (2024)
  - Liabilities: ₱ 205.4 million (2024)
- Time zone: UTC+8 (PST)
- PSGC: 051600000
- IDD : area code: +63 (0)54
- ISO 3166 code: PH-CAN
- Spoken languages: Central Bikol; Tagalog; English; Manide
- Website: camsnorte.com

Camarines Norte (Central Bikol: Amihanan na Camarines; Filipino: Hilagang Camarines), officially the Province of Camarines Norte (Central Bikol: Probinsya kan Amihanan na Camarines; Tagalog: Lalawigan ng Hilagang Camarines), is a province in the Philippines located in the Bicol Region in Luzon. Its capital is Daet, while Labo is most populous town in the province. The province borders Quezon to the west, Camarines Sur to the south, and the Philippine Sea to the north. It has historically been a Bikol-speaking region. However, there has been a language shift in recent years to Tagalog, which is more commonly used nowadays.

== History ==
=== Spanish colonial era ===
Spanish conquistador Juan de Salcedo, dispatched by Miguel López de Legazpi to explore the island in 1571, influenced the existence of Camarines Norte. After subduing Taytay and Cainta, he marched further across Laguna and Tayabas. He visited the rich gold-laden town of Mambulao and Paracale, obsessed by them about which he heard from natives there of existing gold mines.

In 1573, Bicol province was founded. From Bicol, the province of Camarines was created in 1636, which was divided in 1829, creating Camarines Norte and Camarines Sur.

When Camarines Norte was separated from Ambos Camarines in 1829, it was assigned the towns of Daet, as capital, Talisay, Indan (now Vinzons), Labo, Paracale, Mambulao (now Jose Panganiban), Capalonga, Ragay, Lupi and Sipocot.

Seventeen years later, it lost Sipocot, Lupi and Ragay to Camarines Sur in exchange for the town of Siruma.

Camarines Norte and Camarines Sur provinces were briefly merged from 1854 to 1857 into Ambos Camarines (ambos is Spanish for "both"). In 1858, these provinces were separated and were merged into Ambos Camarines once again in 1893.

When Francisco de Sande took over from Legazpi as governor general, Spanish influence started to be felt in the region. He established a permanent Spanish garrison in Naga to control the region and defend it from Chinese and Muslim pirates. Capt. Pedro de Chavez was assigned to head this force.

Native settlements, which include Mambulao and Paracale, were already thriving when the Spaniards arrived. Indan and Daet were the other settlements besides Capalonga. But Paracale remained the most sought after because of its gold mines.

The towns were chiefly inhabited by Tagalogs; the rests were of Visayan strain. However, most of the immigrants were from Mauban, Quezon. The Spanish missionaries established missions to Christianize the natives. In 1818, under undivided Camarines, of which, Camarines Norte was known as Partido de la Contra Costa contained the following number of Spanish-Filipino families in their designated residences: 54 at Paracale, 6 at Indan, 2 at Talisay (Including 2 Lacandulas), and 26 at Daet. Camarines Norte also has an additional 1,722 Spanish-Filipino Mestizo tributes or families.

==== Daet revolt ====
From April 14–17, 1898, local members of the Katipunan led by Ildefonso Moreno and other patriots staged an uprising against the Spanish authorities here who have fortified themselves in the house of one Florencio Arana, a Spanish merchant and a long time resident of Daet. Sporadic encounters started on April 14 until April 16 when the rebels occupied Daet and surrounded the Spaniards in the house of Arana. But the Katipuneros failed to repulse the reinforcements which arrived in Barra (now Mercedes) from Nueva Caceres on April 17. Said reinforcements broke the siege of Daet. This resulted in the death and/or execution of many patriots, including Ildefonso Moreno, Tomas Zaldua and his two sons, Jose Abaño, Domingo Lozada and Aniceto Gregorio, among others. While the Daet revolt collapsed, it signaled the start of a series of rebellion throughout the Bicol region.

=== American era ===
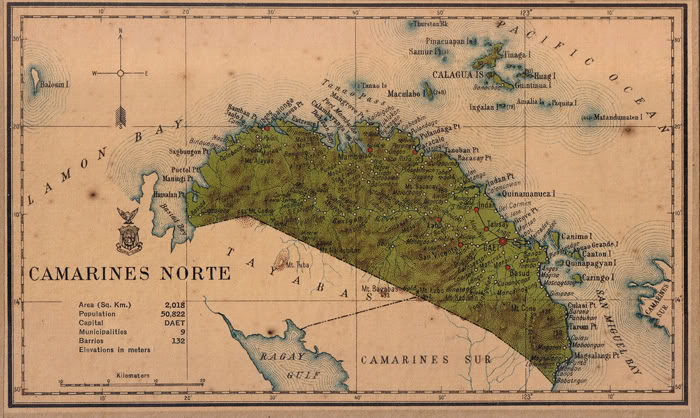
Map of Camarines Norte in 1918

During the American era, Ambos Camarines province was divided into Camarines Norte and Camarines Sur once again in 1917.

By virtue of Act 2809 of March 3, 1919, Governor General F. B. Harrison separated Camarines Norte from Camarines Sur with the installation of Don Miguel R. Lukban as its first governor. "In functional sense, April 15, 1920, was the date of the organization of Camarines Norte, as directed by Executive Order No. 22 dated March 20, 1920, in conformity with the provisions of Act No. 2809," according to Serafin D. Quiason, former chairman of the National Historical Institute (NHI).

=== Japanese occupation ===
The first guerrilla encounter in the Philippines during the second world war in the Pacific occurred on December 18, 1941 – 11 days after the Japanese bombing of Pearl Harbor in Hawaii on Dec. 7, 1941 and 10 days after the attack on Clark Airbase in Pampanga on Dec. 8, 1941 - at Laniton, Basud, Camarines Norte when the Vinzons guerrilla group with some elements of USAFFE units engaged the vanguard of the Japanese Imperial Army advancing towards Daet, the capital town. A shrine was put up in Laniton to mark this historic feat of arms while surviving veterans and the sons and daughters of veterans who fell commemorate this event every Dec. 18 in Basud and Daet under the auspices of the Veterans Federation of the Philippines – Camarines Norte Chapter (VFP-CN), Basud Municipal Government and the Provincial Government.

The general headquarters of Philippine Commonwealth Army started their operations on January 3, 1942. The Philippine Constabulary in Camarines Norte was then established on October 28, 1944. When the U.S. liberation forces returned to the province in 1945, they helped the local Filipino troops and Bicolano guerrillas in the liberation from the Japanese Imperial forces.

=== Philippine independence ===
==== Martial law era ====
On the evening of September 23, 1972, President Ferdinand Marcos announced on television that he had placed the Philippines, including Camarines Norte, under martial law. The Philippines remained under a formal state of Martial Law until January 17, 1981, but Marcos retained essentially all of his powers as dictator after the formal end of Martial Law. The country thus remained under one-man rule for a total of fourteen years ending only when Marcos was deposed by the February 1986 People Power revolution.

On June 14, 1982 Marcos administration forces opened fire on protesters from different barrios, who were marching to demand an increase in copra prices, and to denounce "fake elections" and Cocofed. Four people died on the spot, and at least 50 were injured. Two of those who were seriously wounded died two months later. This has come to be known as the "1981 Daet massacre," and four of those killed have since been honored by having their names engraved on the Wall of Remembrance at the Bantayog ng mga Bayani memorial.

=== Contemporary ===
==== Extreme weather incidents in the 1990s ====
During the 1990s, Camarines Norte was among the provinces most strongly hit by two of the twelve most severe typhoons in Philppine History - Typhoon Angela, locally known as Rosing, in November 1995; and Typhoon Babs, locally known "Loleng" in October 1998.

== Geography ==
Camarines Norte covers a total area of 2,320.07 square kilometres (895.78 sq mi) occupying the northwestern coast of the Bicol Peninsula in the southeastern section of Luzon.

One of the six provinces comprising Region V (Bicol), it is bounded on the northeast by the Philippine Sea, east by the San Miguel Bay, west by Lamon Bay, southwest by Quezon province, and southeast by Camarines Sur.

Its capital town, Daet, is 342 kilometres (213 mi) southeast of Metro Manila, an 8 to 10 hour drive by bus, 6 to 7 hour by private car.

=== Climate ===
Climate data for Camarines Norte
Month	Jan	Feb	Mar	Apr	May	Jun	Jul	Aug	Sep	Oct	Nov	Dec	Year
Mean daily maximum °C (°F)	28.6 (83.5)	29 (84)	30 (86)	31.7 (89.1)	32.4 (90.3)	32.6 (90.7)	32 (90)	31.8 (89.2)	31.8 (89.2)	30.7 (87.3)	30.1 (86.2)	28.9 (84.0)	30.8 (87.5)
Mean daily minimum °C (°F)	24 (75)	24 (75)	24.6 (76.3)	25.6 (78.1)	25.7 (78.3)	25.4 (77.7)	25.3 (77.5)	25.2 (77.4)	24.9 (76.8)	24.9 (76.8)	25.2 (77.4)	24.8 (76.6)	25.0 (76.9)
Average rainy days	20	14	13	9	11	16	16	15	17	21	24	23	199
Source: Storm247

=== Administrative divisions ===
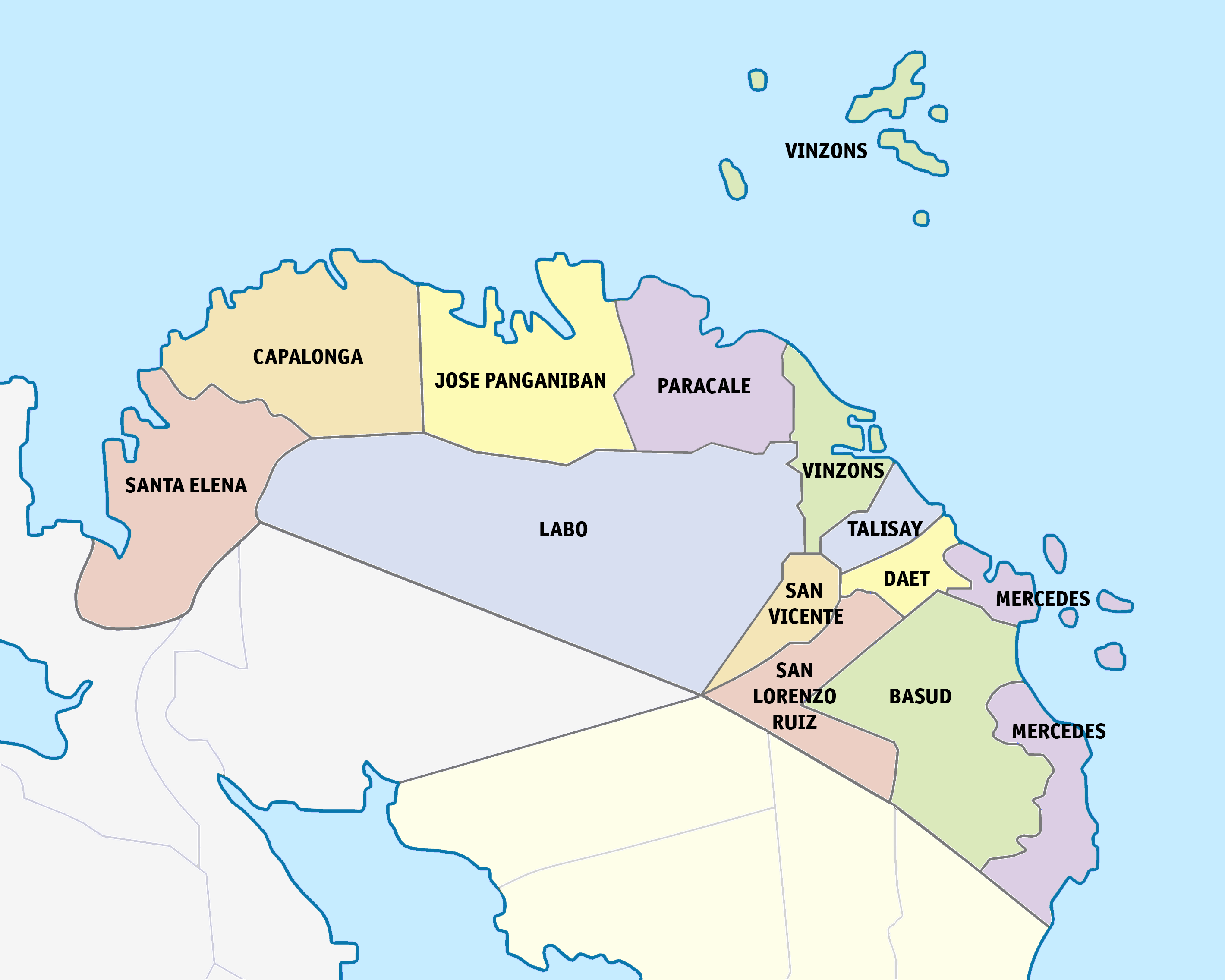
Political map of Camarines Norte

Camarines Norte is subdivided into two legislative districts comprising a total of 12 municipalities.

† Provincial capital

Municipality		District	Population			±% p.a.	Area		Density		Barangay	Coordinates^{[A]}
			(2020)		(2015)		km^{2}	sq mi	/km^{2}	/sq mi		
Basud		2nd	7.2%	45,133	41,017	+1.84%	260.28	100.49	170	440	29	14°03′57″N 122°57′46″E
Capalonga		1st	5.8%	36,223	32,215	+2.26%	290.00	111.97	120	310	22	14°19′54″N 122°29′38″E
Daet	†	2nd	17.7%	111,700	104,799	+1.22%	46.00	17.76	2,400	6,200	25	14°06′48″N 122°57′21″E
Jose Panganiban		1st	10.1%	63,662	59,639	+1.25%	214.44	82.80	300	780	27	14°17′23″N 122°41′30″E
Labo		1st	17.3%	109,245	101,082	+1.49%	589.36	227.55	190	490	52	14°09′20″N 122°49′51″E
Mercedes		2nd	8.8%	55,334	50,841	+1.63%	173.69	67.06	320	830	26	14°06′34″N 123°00′33″E
Paracale		1st	9.6%	60,198	59,149	+0.34%	197.90	76.41	300	780	27	14°16′49″N 122°47′17″E
San Lorenzo Ruiz		2nd	2.5%	15,757	14,063	+2.19%	119.37	46.09	130	340	12	14°02′12″N 122°52′05″E
San Vicente		2nd	2.0%	12,579	10,396	+3.70%	57.49	22.20	220	570	9	14°06′23″N 122°52′23″E
Santa Elena		1st	6.9%	43,582	40,786	+1.27%	199.35	76.97	220	570	19	14°11′06″N 122°23′38″E
Talisay		2nd	4.3%	27,244	25,841	+1.01%	30.76	11.88	890	2,300	15	14°08′14″N 122°55′32″E
Vinzons		2nd	7.8%	49,042	43,485	+2.32%	99.29	38.34	490	1,300	19	14°10′25″N 122°54′35″E
Total				629,699	583,313	+1.47%	2,277.93	879.51	280	730	282	(see GeoGroup box)
1. Coordinates mark the poblacion (town center), and are sortable by latitude.

== Demographics ==
The population of Camarines Norte in the 2024 census was 604,666 people, with a density of 260 inhabitants per square kilometre or 670 inhabitants per square mile.

Population census of Camarines Norte

Year	Pop.	±% p.a.
1903	45,503	—
1918	52,081	+0.90%
1939	98,324	+3.07%
1948	103,702	+0.59%
1960	188,091	+5.09%
1970	262,207	+3.37%

Year	Pop.	±% p.a.
1975	288,406	+1.93%
1980	308,007	+1.32%
1990	390,982	+2.41%
1995	439,151	+2.20%
2000	470,654	+1.50%
2007	513,785	+1.22%

Year	Pop.	±% p.a.
2010	542,915	+2.03%
2015	583,313	+1.38%
2020	629,699	+1.62%
2024	604,666	−0.97%

Source: Philippine Statistics Authority

=== Religious Beliefs ===
Prior to colonization, the region had a complex religious system which involved various deities. Among these deities include: Gugurang, the supreme god who dwells inside of Mount Mayon where he guards and protects the sacred fire in which Aswang, his brother was trying to steal. Whenever people disobey his orders, wishes and commit numerous sins, he would cause Mount Mayon to burst lava as a sign of warning for people to mend their crooked ways. Ancient Bikolanos had a rite performed for him called Atang.; Asuang, the evil god who always tries to steal the sacred fire of Mount Mayon from his brother, Gugurang. Addressed sometimes as Aswang, he dwells mainly inside Mount Malinao. As an evil god, he would cause the people to suffer misfortunes and commit sins. Enemy of Gugurang and a friend of Bulan the god of the moon; Haliya, the masked goddess of the moonlight and the arch-enemy of Bakunawa and protector of Bulan. Her cult is composed primarily of women. There is also a ritual dance named after her as it is performed to be a counter-measure against Bakunawa.; Bulan, the god of the pale moon, he is depicted as a pubescent boy with uncommon comeliness that made savage beast and the vicious mermaids (Magindara) tame. He has deep affection towards Magindang, but plays with him by running away so that Magindang would never catch him. The reason for this is because he is shy to the man that he loves. If Magindang manages to catch Bulan, Haliya always comes to free him from Magindang's grip; Magindang, the god of the sea and all its creatures. He has deep affection to the lunar god Bulan and pursues him despite never catching him. Due to this, the Bicolanos reasoned that it is to why the waves rise to reach the Moon when seen from the distant horizon. Whenever he does catch up to Bulan, Haliya comes to rescue Bulan and free him immediately; Okot, god of forest and hunting; and Bakunawa, a gigantic sea serpent deity who is often considered as the cause of eclipses, the devourer of the Sun and the Moon, and an adversary of Haliya as Bakunawa's main aim is to swallow Bulan, who Haliya swore to protect for all of eternity.

==== Catholicism ====
The majority of the population are followers of Roman Catholic church with 93% of the population adherence.

==== Others ====
The rest of the people's faith is divided by several Christian groups such as Iglesia ni Cristo (INC), Iglesia Filipina Independiente or Aglipayan Church, Baptists, Methodists, Mormons, Jehovah's Witnesses, Seventh-day Adventist, other Christians and also Muslims which demographic is mostly traced to Mindanao.

=== Language ===
The Central Bikol dialect has historically been the main language spoken in the province. Tagalog is slowly taking over as the most common language and English is also widely understood and used in businesses and education. The Manide language is also spoken in minority by the Manide indigenous peoples, concentrated mainly on the towns of Jose Panganiban, Labo, and Paracale.

Camarines Norte is unique among the Tagalog provinces for its proximity to the Bicol region. The proximity of Tagalog speakers in Camarines Norte, especially in crossroads, has created a unique variety of Tagalog which is enriched by Bikol in different aspects including phonology, morphology, grammar and even discourse. Based on the findings of the dialectology done by Andrew Rey Sosa Pena, three dialect areas have been suggested. The first ones would be Sta. Elena, Capalonga, Jose Panganiban, and Paracale, which are relatively uninfluenced by Bikol but rather have similar dialect spoken in nearby Quezon Province. The second dialect area is composed of Labo and Vinzons, which have developed a unique dialect in which the people of Camarines Norte talk about "Salitang Vinzons" and "Salitang Labo". The third dialect area is composed of Daet, San Vicente, Talisay, Mercedes, Basud, and San Lorenzo Ruiz, which have a high concentration of Bikol speakers and where Tagalog is highly influenced by Bikol vocabulary, phonology, and grammar.

== Economy ==
Poverty incidence of Camarines Norte (%)

Source: Philippine Statistics Authority

The province's economy largely depends on agriculture, with grain crops, vegetables, coconuts, root crops and fruits, but they are well known with small sweet pineapple.

The four major manufacturing and processing industries in the province are mining (particularly gold and iron ore), jewelry craft, pineapple and coconut industry.

Other sources of the province's economical stability are from the growth of numbers in terms of tourists. The province offers various attractions for foreign people, i.e. beaches, mountains, and religious places.

=== Infrastructure ===
The province has an international seaport located at Barangay Osmeña, Jose Panganiban town servicing one of its major industries, Pan Century Surfactants. The seaport is approximately 5 kilometres (3.1 mi) from the town proper and an hour ride to the capital town of Daet.

The province has 13 fishing ports in the coastal municipalities and one feeder airport in Bagasbas, Daet.

== Government ==
Current Provincial Government Officials (2025-2028)

- Governor: Ricarte R. Padilla (PFP)
- Vice-Governor: Joseph V. Ascutia (Liberal)

Sangguniang Panlalawigan Members:

1st District:

- John Carlo v. De Lima (PFP)
- Winifredo B. Oco (PFP)
- Arthur Michael G. Canlas (PFP)
- Jhonny A. Enova (NPC)
- Teresita D.L. Malubay (PFP)

2nd District:

- Dennis L. Riel (PFP)
- Arnulfo M. Balane (PFP)
- Jonah Pedro G. Pimentel (Nacionalista)
- Rodolfo D. Gache (PFP)
- Renne H. Depante (PFP)

Ex-Officio Members:

- Rebecca Padilla (President, LNB)
- TBD (President, PCL)
- Mary Joy Carranza (President, Panlalawigang Pederasyon ng Sangguniang Kabataan)
- Ricky Noblesala (Representative, IPMR)

=== House of Representatives ===
District	Representative	Party	Term	Bloc
1st	Josefina B. Tallado	NPC	3	Majority
2nd	Rosemarie C. Panotes	Lakas	2	Majority

== Festivals and Events ==
The Bantayog Festival

The Bantayog Festival is a historical commemorating festival in Camarines Norte that features the first Rizal monument which is also the centerpiece of the celebration held simultaneous with the foundation anniversary of the province. The Bantayog Festival is also celebrated in each town of the province with their own festivals such as the “Pinayasan” in Daet; “Palayogan” (from the root word Palay and Niyog) in Santa Elena; “Babakasin” in Vinzons; “Pabirik ng Bayan” in Paracale town; and the “Mananap” in San Vicente.

Bantayog Climb

The Bantayog climb is an annual event organized by Oryol Outdoor Group Inc. as part of the activities during Bantayog Festival.

The Pineapple (pinyasan) Festival

Pinyasan (Pineapple) Festival showcases Camarines Norte's premier agri-product which is the sweetest pineapple called Formosa.

- Summer Surf Fest
- Annual Kiteboarding Competition
- Paragliding and Hang-gliding Towing Competition

Gold-panning or Pabirik Festival

The Pabirik Festival is a week long celebration which commemorates the past culture, traditions, history and customs of Paracale considered as a gold town of Camarines Norte. A highlight of the Pabirik Festival gives emphasis on its rich mining industry while showcasing its gold products all of which are available in the municipality. Pabirik means “pan” which is a medium used by the natives of Paracale in gold panning.

Palong Festival

The Palong festival coincides with the feast of the Black Nazarene and is celebrated through street dancing and an agro-industrial fair to which the natives express their gratitude for the abundance of ornamental plants known as rooster combs or “palong manok”.

Kadagatan Festival

The Kadagatan festival is celebrated by fishermen to give respect, express gratitude and recognize Mother Nature for the vast marine resources the town of Mercedes are blessed with.

Busig-on Festival

The Busig-on festival is based on the epic of the hero Busig-on who hails from Labo town and also of Bicolano values. The festival is a showcase of talent and skills in a competitive manner while showing the town's places of interest and featuring the town's unique historical values.

Mambulawan Festival

Held to coincide with the Feast of Our Lady of the Most Holy Rosary, the festival aims to forge unity and cooperation among the local community, promote culture and arts, revitalization of mining industry, exposition of the town''s best, homecoming and involvement of Balikbayans, all geared towards advancement and economic growth.

Tacboan Festival

The Tacboan Festival is based on the hero Wenceslao Q. Vinzons it is celebrated with Civic Military Parade, CAT & DLC Competition, & Float Competition every year at September 28

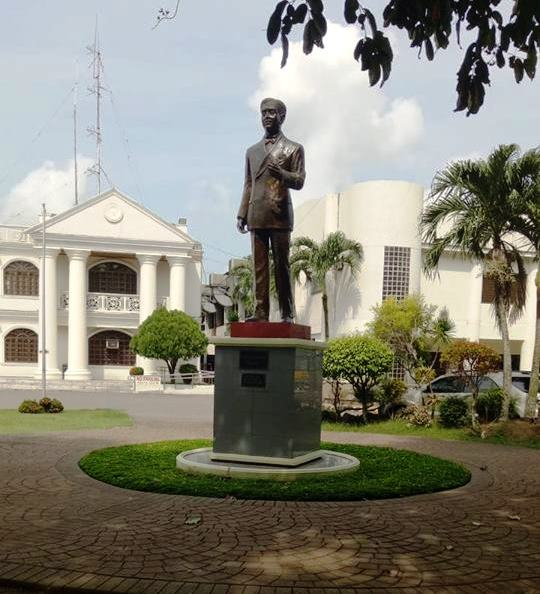
Vinzons monument in front of provincial capitol of Camarines Norte

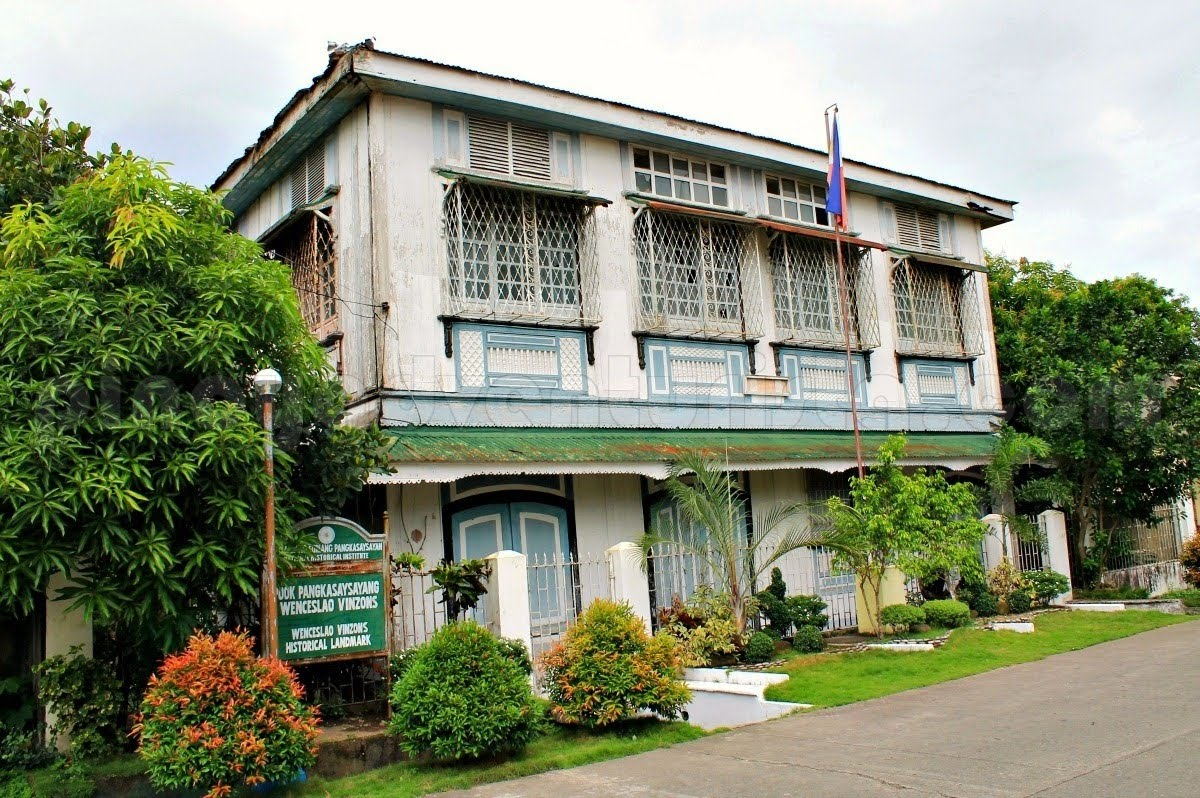
Ancestral house of the Vinzons family in Vinzons, Camarines Norte

Wenceslao "Bintao" Quinito Vinzons, Sr. (born Wenceslao Quinito Vinzons; September 28, 1910 – July 15, 1942) was a Filipino patriot and leader of the Philippine armed resistance against the Japanese invasion in World War II. He was the youngest delegate to the 1935 Philippine Constitutional Convention. For leading demonstrations as a student leader, he was dubbed the "Father of Student Activism in the Philippines" when he, along with Narciso J. Alegre and future Senator and Vice-President Arturo M. Tolentino, founded the Young Philippines Party.

Vinzons was among the first Filipinos to organize a guerrilla movement at the onset of the Japanese invasion of the Philippines in 1941. In the course of the resistance, he was captured and executed by the occupying Japanese military.

== Notable people from Camarines Norte ==
- José María Panganiban — Bicolano propagandist, linguist, and essayist. He is one of the main writers and contributors for La Solidaridad, writing under the pen names "Jomapa" and "J.M.P." His birthplace, then named Mambulao, was renamed in his honor.
- Gen. Vicente R. Lukban — officer in Emilio Aguinaldo's staff during the Philippine Revolution and the politico-military chief of Samar and Leyte during the Philippine–American War. On September 28, 1901, Sunday, he led Filipino rebels, armed only with bolos and sharpened bamboo poles, in an attack against the contingent of American forces in Balangiga, Samar. Only 36 troopers of Company C, 9th Infantry Regiment of the US Forces survived the attack against 16 casualties among the Filipino rebels, giving the encounter its famous label "Balangiga Massacre" in Philippine history.
- Wenceslao Q. Vinzons, Sr. — Lawyer, orator, labor leader, writer, youngest delegate to the 1935 Constitutional Convention and youngest signatory of the Charter at the age of 25. As the governor in 1940 and congressman-elect in 1941 and refusing to surrender, he evacuated the provincial government during the Japanese occupation to the hinterlands of Labo and led a guerrilla force against the Japanese forces. His birthplace, then named Indan, was renamed in his honor.
- Manuel Conde — legendary film actor, director, producer, and National Artist of the Philippines.
- Ricky Lee — screenwriter, journalist, novelist, playwright, and National Artist of the Philippines.
- Robin Padilla — Senator in the 19th Congress, actor.
- Liwayway Vinzons-Chato — former Bureau of Internal Revenue commissioner and Lone District of Camarines Norte congresswoman.
- Ronald Moreno – Sandiganbayan Associate Justice.
- Gerard Francisco Timoner III – 88th Master of the Order of Preachers and first Asian to hold the position.
- Ronald Timoner – Bishop of Pagadian.
- Rex Andrew Alarcon – Archbishop of Cáceres.
- Manolo de los Santos – Bishop emeritus of Virac.
- Jammer Jamito — Maharlika Pilipinas Basketball League player for Caloocan Batang Kankaloo.
- Justin Arana — Philippine Basketball Association player for the Converge FiberXers.
- Precious Paula Nicole — Winner of Drag Race Philippines Season 1.

== List of waterfalls ==
Nestled between verdant mountains, tropical forests, and winding river systems, the Province of Camarines Norte is home to many waterfalls in the Bicol Region. The province contains a diverse collection of natural wonders.

Known for its rich biodiversity and unspoiled landscapes, Camarines Norte provides countless opportunities for adventure and discovery. Each waterfall possesses its own unique character, whether reached through scenic trekking trails, forested river crossings, or peaceful countryside paths. Together, these natural attractions showcase the province's remarkable ecological heritage and enduring connection to nature.

Beyond their breathtaking beauty, the waterfalls of Camarines Norte serve as places of recreation, reflection, and environmental appreciation. Visitors can enjoy swimming in refreshing waters, capturing dramatic landscapes through photography, or simply immersing themselves in the serenity of the natural surroundings.

Whether you are an outdoor enthusiast, a nature photographer, or a traveler seeking hidden destinations off the beaten path, the waterfalls of Camarines Norte offer unforgettable experiences for every kind of explorer.

==== Basud ====
- Dung-awan Falls, Brgy. Binatagan
- Lidong Falls, Brgy. Lidong
- Balubak Falls, Brgy. Manmuntay
- Twin Falls, Brgy. San Felipe
- Reyna Safari Heroes Falls, Brgy. San Pascual

==== Capalonga ====
- Bangka-bangka Falls, Brgy. Alayao
- Banokbok Falls, Brgy. Alayao
- Cabugao Falls, Brgy. Alayao
- Samat Falls, Brgy. Alayao
- Francisco Falls, Brgy. Alayao
- Unnamed Seasonal Falls, Brgy. Alayao
- Gonzales Falls, Brgy. Binawangan
- Itok Falls, Brgy. Itok
- Bulusukan Falls, Brgy. Itok
- Kawa-kawa Falls, Brgy. Itok
- Lukbanan Falls, Brgy. Lukbanan
- Villanueva Falls, Brgy. Mabini
- Tinggil-bato Falls, Brgy. Mataque
- Cabiho Falls, Brgy. Mataque
- Paniqui Falls, Brgy. Mataque
- Kamagong Falls, Brgy. Mataque
- Unnamed Falls, Brgy. Mataque
- Makaingot Falls, Brgy. Mataque
- Magsagaoc Falls, Brgy. Old Camp
- Mabato Falls, Brgy. Magsaysay
- Unnamed Falls, Brgy. San Antonio
- Tanauan Falls, Brgy. Tanauan
- Aurora Falls, Brgy. Villa Aurora
- Nabangka Falls, Brgy. Villa Aurora
- Tagabong Falls, Brgy. Villa Aurora

== See also ==
- List of Bicol Region Cities and Municipalities
