= Mercedes, Camarines Norte =

Municipality in Camarines Norte, Philippines

Mercedes
- Municipality
- Municipality of Mercedes
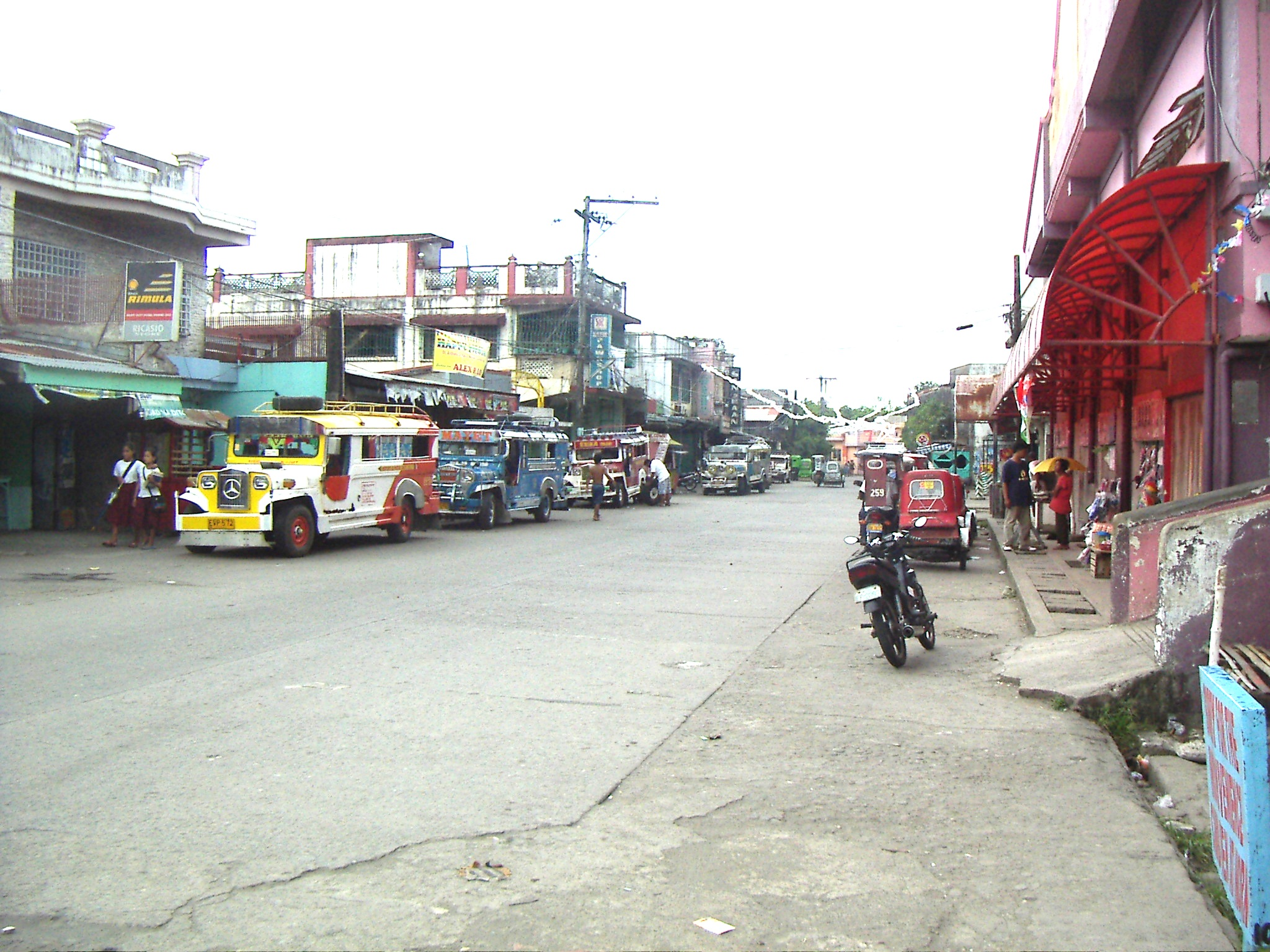
- Downtown area

- Flag Seal

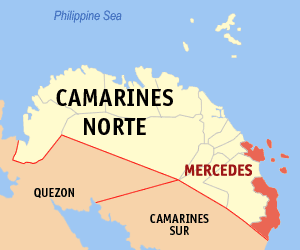
- Map of Camarines Norte with Mercedes highlighted
- Interactive map of Mercedes
- Location within the Philippines
- Coordinates: 14°06′33″N 123°00′39″E
- Country: Philippines
- Region: Bicol Region
- Province: Camarines Norte
- District: 2nd district
- Founded: 1948
- Barangays: 26 (see Barangays)

Government
  - Type: Sangguniang Bayan
  - Mayor: Alexander Pajarillo
  - Vice Mayor: Jeana T. Yapyuco
  - Representative: Rosemarie C. Panotes
  - Municipal Council: Members: Francisco Noel Y. Ong; Charlie O. Villamarzo; Jesus R. King; Ruel A. Nael; Raymond I. Bautista; Francisca L. Ramos Jr.; Princess B. Torralba; Maria Velia Flor N. Ibasco
  - Electorate: 35,954 voters (2025)

Area
  - Total: 173.69 km^{2} (67.06 sq mi)
- Elevation: 3.0 m (9.8 ft)
- Highest elevation: 61 m (200 ft)
- Lowest elevation: −2 m (−6.6 ft)

Population (2024 census)
  - Total: 53,702
  - Density: 309.18/km^{2} (800.78/sq mi)
  - Households: 12,571

Economy
  - Income class: 1st municipal income class
  - Poverty incidence: 31.54% (2023)
  - Revenue: ₱ 247.2 million (2024)
  - Assets: ₱ 798.3 million (2024)
  - Expenditure: ₱ 238.2 million (2024)
  - Liabilities: ₱ 155.9 million (2024)

Service provider
  - Electricity: Camarines Norte Electric Cooperative (CANORECO)
- Time zone: UTC+8 (PST)
- ZIP code: 4601
- PSGC: 0501607000
- IDD : area code: +63 (0)54
- Native languages: Central Bikol; Tagalog

Mercedes, officially the Municipality of Mercedes (Central Bikol: Banwaan kan Mercedes; Tagalog: Bayan ng Mercedes), is a municipality in the province of Camarines Norte, Philippines. According to the 2024 census, it has a population of 53,702 people.

The town's offshore islands are home to the easternmost population of the critically-endangered Irrawaddy dolphin.

== Etymology ==
The town was originally named "Barra", and it was a barangay of Daet, the provincial capital. Its name was changed to Mercedes after Doña Mercedes, a rich woman who devoted her life of helping the community, especially the poor.

== History ==
Mercedes was created from the barrios of Babatnon, Lanot, Lalawigan, Pinagdamhan, Hamoraon, Colasi, Tarum, Pambuhan, Masalong-salong, Hinipaan, Matoogtoog, Cayucyucan, Mambongalon, Manguisoc, Gaboc, Mercedes, Tanayagan, Tagontong, Catandonganon, Cariñgo Island, Quinapaquian Island, Apuao Island, all formerly part of Daet, Camarines Norte, by virtue of Republic Act No. 341, approved on July 26, 1948.

== Geography ==
=== Barangays ===
Mercedes is politically subdivided into 26 barangays. Each barangay consists of puroks and some have sitios.

- Apuao
- Barangay I (Poblacion)
- Barangay II (Poblacion)
- Barangay III (Poblacion)
- Barangay IV (Poblacion)
- Barangay V (Poblacion)
- Barangay VI (Poblacion)
- Barangay VII (Poblacion)
- Caringo
- Catandunganon
- Cayucyucan
- Colasi
- Del Rosario (Tagongtong)
- Gaboc
- Hamoraon
- Hinipaan
- Lalawigan
- Lanot
- Mambungalon
- Manguisoc
- Masalongsalong
- Matoogtoog
- Pambuhan
- Quinapaguian
- San Roque
- Tarum

=== Climate ===
Climate data for Mercedes, Camarines Norte
Month	Jan	Feb	Mar	Apr	May	Jun	Jul	Aug	Sep	Oct	Nov	Dec	Year
Mean daily maximum °C (°F)	27 (81)	27 (81)	29 (84)	31 (88)	31 (88)	30 (86)	29 (84)	29 (84)	29 (84)	29 (84)	28 (82)	27 (81)	29 (84)
Mean daily minimum °C (°F)	22 (72)	22 (72)	22 (72)	23 (73)	25 (77)	25 (77)	25 (77)	24 (75)	24 (75)	24 (75)	24 (75)	23 (73)	24 (74)
Average precipitation mm (inches)	85 (3.3)	55 (2.2)	53 (2.1)	47 (1.9)	112 (4.4)	156 (6.1)	213 (8.4)	159 (6.3)	201 (7.9)	216 (8.5)	197 (7.8)	141 (5.6)	1,635 (64.5)
Average rainy days	15.4	11.6	13.6	12.3	19.9	23.7	27.3	26.0	26.0	24.6	21.8	19.1	241.3
Source: Meteoblue

== Demographics ==
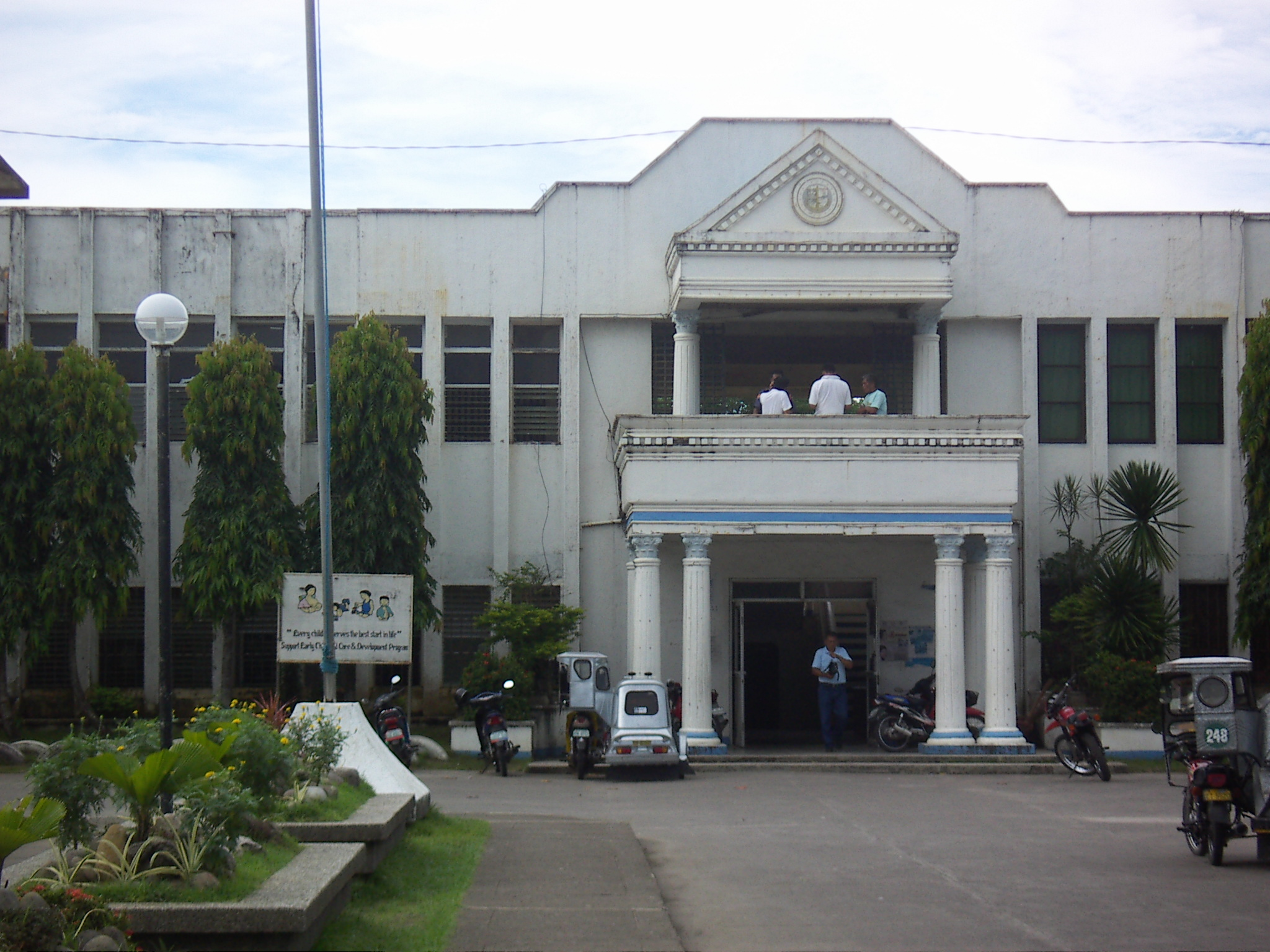
Municipal hall

Population census of Mercedes
Year	Pop.	±% p.a.
1948	7,247	—
1960	13,983	+5.63%
1970	19,674	+3.47%
1975	25,161	+5.06%
1980	27,645	+1.90%
1990	34,300	+2.18%
1995	38,641	+2.26%
2000	41,713	+1.65%
2007	44,375	+0.86%
2010	47,674	+2.64%
2015	50,841	+1.23%
2020	55,334	+1.80%
2024	53,702	−0.72%
Source: Philippine Statistics Authority

In the 2024 census, the population of Mercedes was 53,702 people, with a density of 310 inhabitants per square kilometre or 800 inhabitants per square mile.

== Economy ==
Poverty incidence of Mercedes (%)

Source: Philippine Statistics Authority

== Tourism ==
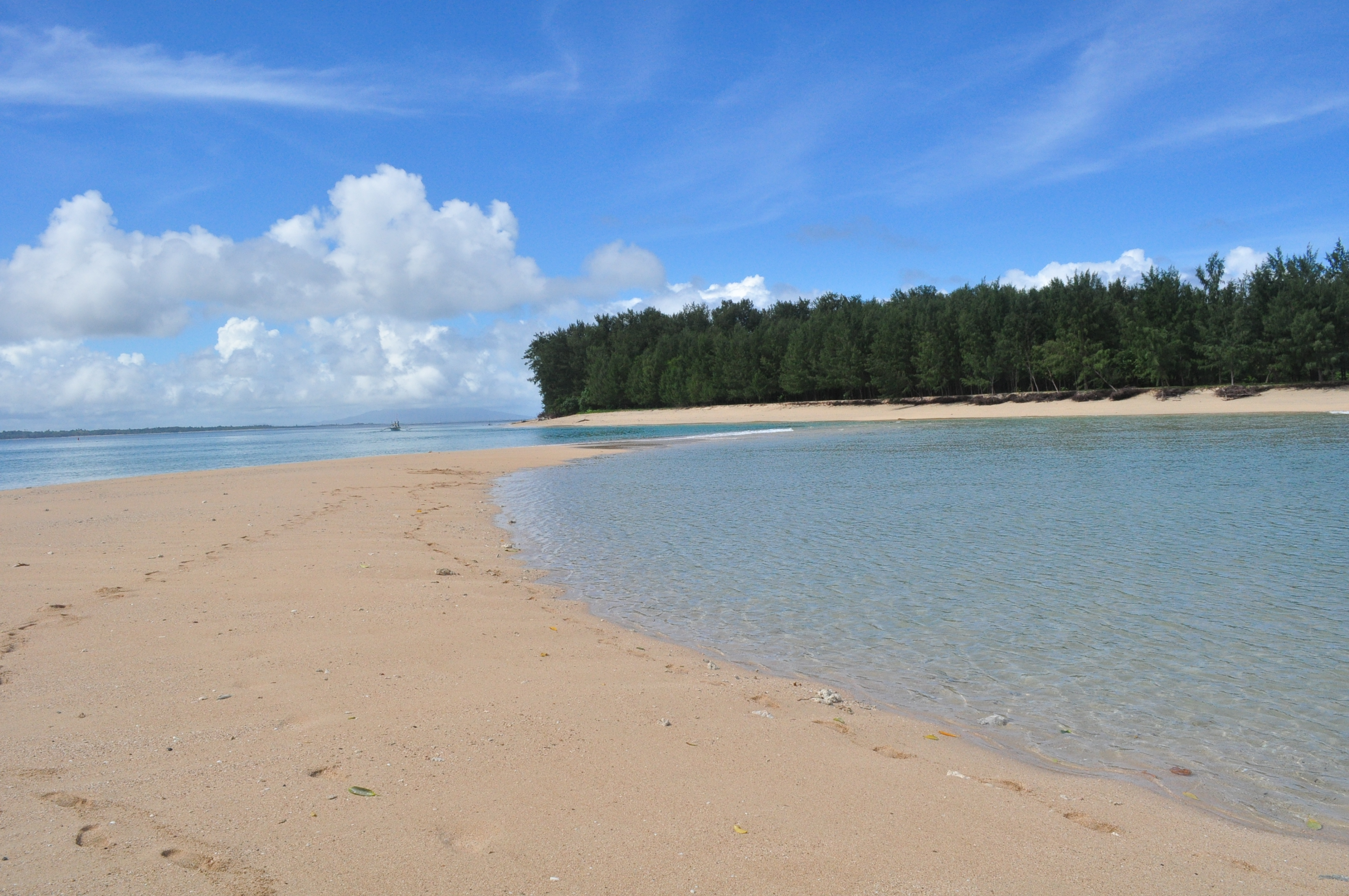
Apuao Island

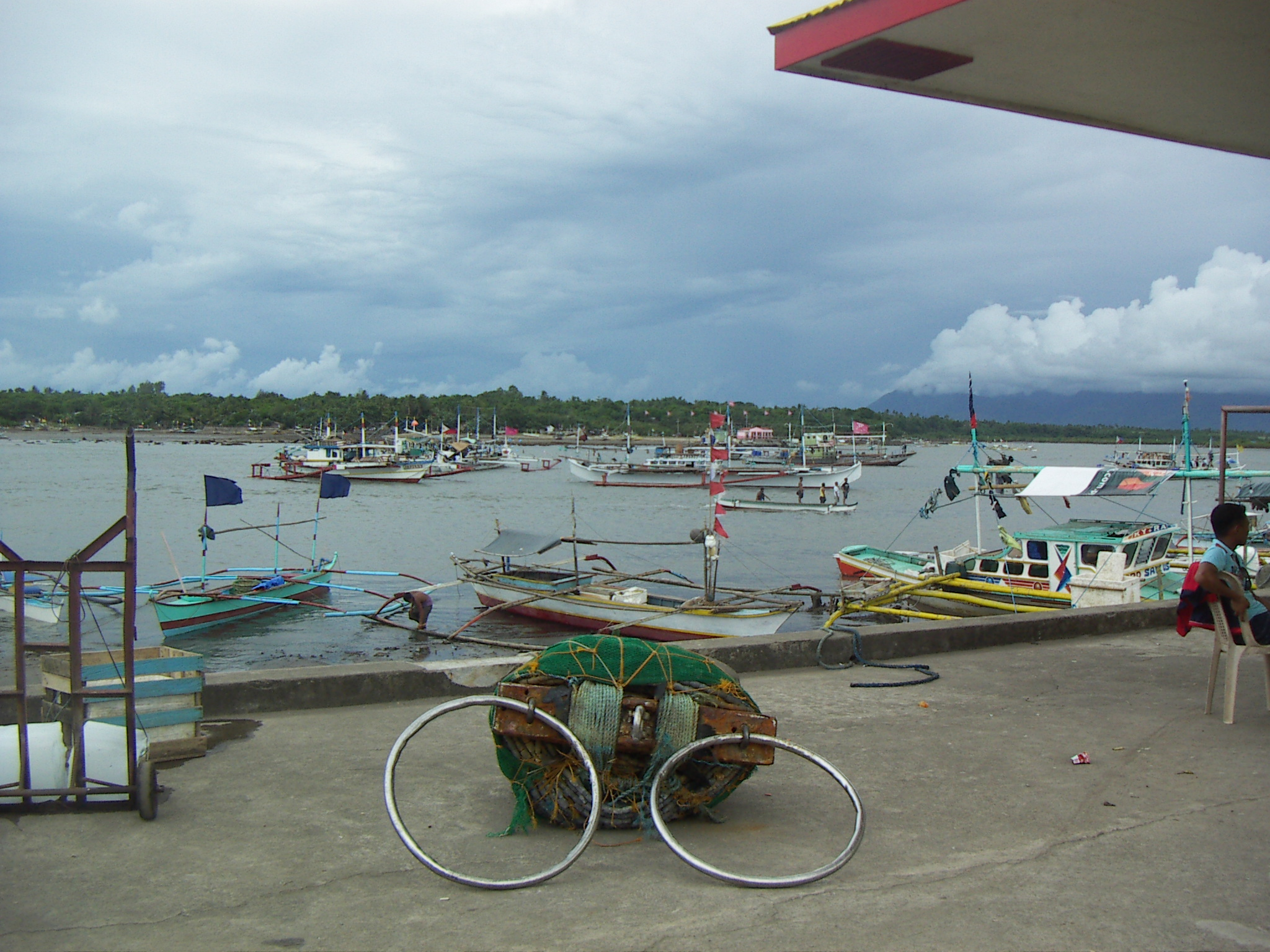
Port of Mercedes

Waterfalls:

- Colasi Falls - barangay Colasi
- Malunay Falls - sitio Malunay
- Bahaw Falls - barangay Hamoraon
- Hinipaan Falls - barangay Hinipaan

== Education ==
The Mercedes Schools District Office governs all educational institutions within the municipality. It oversees the management and operations of all private and public, from primary to secondary schools.

=== Primary and elementary schools ===
- Cayucyucan Elementary School
- Claro Ibasco Elementary School
- Colasi Elementary School
- Gaboc Elementary School
- Hamoraon Elementary School
- Hinipaan Elementary School
- Lalawigan Elementary School
- Lanot Elementary School
- Lope Manlangit Elementary School
- Mambungalon Elementary School
- Manguisoc Elementary School
- Mansalongsalong Elementary School
- Matoogtoog Elementary School
- Mercedes Elementary School
- Quinapaguian Elementary School
- Pambuhan Elementary School
- San Roque Elementary School
- Tagongtong Elementary School
- Tarum Elementary School

=== Secondary schools ===
- Don Pablo S Villafuerte National High School
- Manguisoc National High School
- Mercedes High School
- San Roque National High School

=== Higher educational institution ===
- Camarines Norte State College - Mercedes Campus (formerly Mercedes School of Fisheries)
