= Basud =

Municipality in Camarines Norte, Philippines

- Municipality
- Municipality of Basud
- Flag

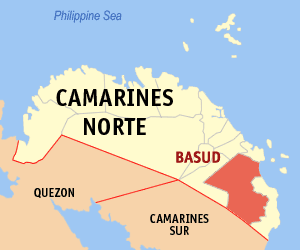
- Map of Camarines Norte with Basud highlighted
- Interactive map of Basud
- Location within the Philippines
- Coordinates: 14°04′N 122°58′E
- Country: Philippines
- Region: Bicol Region
- Province: Camarines Norte
- District: 2nd district
- Founded: 1902
- Barangays: 29 (see Barangays)

Government
  - Type: Sangguniang Bayan
  - Mayor: Adrian S. Davoco
  - Vice Mayor: Ramir A. Barrameda
  - Representative: Rosemarie C. Panotes
  - Municipal Council: Members: Gerardo G. Quiñones; Norma P. Zamudio; Pablo R. Ablaneda; Jose Mari P. Ayton; Franz Inah A. Macale; Melvin G. Samonte; Danilo A. Presado; Eduardo A. de Vera
  - Electorate: 29,623 voters (2025)

Area
  - Total: 260.28 km^{2} (100.49 sq mi)
- Elevation: 20 m (66 ft)
- Highest elevation: 112 m (367 ft)
- Lowest elevation: −2 m (−6.6 ft)

Population (2024 census)
  - Total: 43,388
  - Density: 166.70/km^{2} (431.74/sq mi)
  - Households: 10,409

Economy
  - Income class: 1st municipal income class
  - Poverty incidence: 26.13% (2023)
  - Revenue: ₱ 233 million (2024)
  - Assets: ₱ 811.7 million (2024)
  - Expenditure: ₱ 226.5 million (2024)
  - Liabilities: ₱ 200.3 million (2024)

Service provider
  - Electricity: Camarines Norte Electric Cooperative (CANORECO)
- Time zone: UTC+8 (PST)
- ZIP code: 4608
- PSGC: 0501601000
- IDD : area code: +63 (0)54
- Native languages: Central Bikol; Tagalog; Manide

Basud, officially the Municipality of Basud (Central Bikol: Banwaan kan Basud; Tagalog: Bayan ng Basud), is a municipality in the province of Camarines Norte, Philippines. According to the 2024 census, it has a population of 43,388 people.

It is home to several natural attractions, including the Basud Wildlife Sanctuary, a protected area rich in flora and fauna that promotes wildlife conservation. Visitors can also enjoy the Scenic Hilltop Viewpoint, which offers wide views of green hills and the coast, and the Basud Riverbank Promenade, a peaceful riverside spot ideal for walks and relaxation.

== Geography ==
The municipality has a total land area of 26,028 hectares (64,320 acres), representing about 11.59 percent of the total land area of the province. Basud is 5 kilometres (3.1 mi) from Daet and 347 kilometres (216 mi) from Manila.

=== Barangays ===
Basud is politically subdivided into 29 barangays. Each barangay consists of puroks and some have sitios.

On June 6, 1988, Barangay Poblacion was divided into two through the initiative of late Municipal Councilor Modesto A. Zepeda during the incumbency of then Mayor Silverio F. Quiñones Jr.

Barangay	Population (2020)	Population Share (2020)	Population (2010)	Population Change	
Barangay	Population (2020)	Population Share (2020)	Population (2010)	%	Individuals
Angas	1,483	3.29%	1,175	26.21%	308
Bactas	2,005	4.44%	1,599	25.39%	406
Binatagan	453	1.00%	397	14.11%	56
Caayunan	1,444	3.20%	1,244	16.08%	200
Guinatungan	864	1.91%	857	0.82%	7
Hinampacan	792	1.75%	650	21.85%	142
Langa	974	2.16%	830	17.35%	144
Laniton	1,888	4.18%	1,490	26.71%	398
Lidong	456	1.01%	401	13.72%	55
Mampili	1,400	3.10%	1,110	26.13%	290
Mandazo	903	2.00%	711	27.00%	192
Mangcamagong	1,532	3.39%	1,400	9.43%	132
Manmuntay	824	1.83%	669	23.17%	155
Mantugawe	1,307	2.90%	1,056	23.77%	251
Matnog	3,967	8.79%	2,963	33.88%	1,004
Mocong	1,013	2.24%	847	19.60%	166
Oliva	952	2.11%	928	2.59%	24
Pagsangahan	1,418	3.14%	1,337	6.06%	81
Pinagwarasan	1,277	2.83%	1,054	21.16%	223
Plaridel	1,206	2.67%	1,089	10.74%	117
Poblacion 1	3,639	8.06%	3,043	19.59%	596
Poblacion 2	2,752	6.10%	2,701	1.89%	51
San Felipe	3,992	8.84%	3,282	21.63%	710
San Jose	1,162	2.57%	995	16.78%	167
San Pascual	1,847	4.09%	1,560	18.40%	287
Taba-taba	671	1.49%	657	2.13%	14
Tacad	1,226	2.72%	1,028	19.26%	198
Taisan	1,597	3.54%	1,207	32.31%	390
Tuaca	2,089	4.63%	1,896	10.18%	193
TOTAL	45,133		38,176	18.22%	6,957

=== Climate ===
Climate data for Basud, Camarines Norte
Month	Jan	Feb	Mar	Apr	May	Jun	Jul	Aug	Sep	Oct	Nov	Dec	Year
Mean daily maximum °C (°F)	27 (81)	27 (81)	29 (84)	31 (88)	31 (88)	30 (86)	29 (84)	29 (84)	29 (84)	29 (84)	28 (82)	27 (81)	29 (84)
Mean daily minimum °C (°F)	22 (72)	22 (72)	22 (72)	23 (73)	25 (77)	25 (77)	25 (77)	24 (75)	24 (75)	24 (75)	24 (75)	23 (73)	24 (74)
Average precipitation mm (inches)	85 (3.3)	55 (2.2)	53 (2.1)	47 (1.9)	112 (4.4)	156 (6.1)	213 (8.4)	159 (6.3)	201 (7.9)	216 (8.5)	197 (7.8)	141 (5.6)	1,635 (64.5)
Average rainy days	15.4	11.6	13.6	12.3	19.9	23.7	27.3	26.0	26.0	24.6	21.8	19.1	241.3
Source: Meteoblue

== Demographics ==
Population census of Basud
Year	Pop.	±% p.a.
1903	1,949	—
1918	2,547	+1.80%
1939	5,797	+3.99%
1948	11,885	+8.30%
1960	15,302	+2.13%
1970	21,113	+3.27%
1975	21,098	−0.01%
1980	23,042	+1.78%
1990	27,295	+1.71%
1995	30,190	+1.91%
2000	33,885	+2.51%
2007	36,763	+1.13%
2010	38,176	+1.38%
2015	41,017	+1.38%
2020	45,133	+2.03%
2024	43,388	−0.94%
Source: Philippine Statistics Authority

In the 2024 census, the population of Basud was 43,388 people, with a density of 170 inhabitants per square kilometre or 440 inhabitants per square mile.

The municipal population is unevenly distributed over its 29 barangays and varies in terms of population sizes and growth rates. The barangays along the national road recorded the highest population share. In 2007 San Felipe recorded a population share of 8.63%, Barangay Poblacion 1 and Matnog followed with 8.02% and 7.79%, respectively. Binatagan has the least population with 295 or 0.80% of the total population.

== Economy ==
Poverty incidence of Basud (%)

Source: Philippine Statistics Authority

=== Agriculture ===
The municipality's lands, which are devoted to agriculture, have an approximate area of 12,086.60 hectares or 47.38% percent of the municipality's total land area. The municipality is producing three major agricultural crops. Coconut land occupies the largest area that has 10,324 hectares. Rice land, which has the second largest area with 627.10 hectares irrigated and 254 hectares rainfed. The third is 586 hectares planted to pineapple. Other crops are seasonal crops and are being for family consumption only.

==== Crops ====
Copra is known to be the chief product and the main source of income of the municipality. Coconut by-products such as brooms, baskets, charcoal and even soap making are the traditional sources of income of the people.

The second major product of the municipality is palay, which is harvested twice a year in irrigated areas of 627.10 hectares, which has an average yield of 80 cavans per cropping of 74.24 MT per year. Rainfed areas are being harvested once a year with 60 cavans per hectare per cropping or 17.04 MT per year and even lesser in times of calamities and drought.

Pineapple, which lately bloomed in production due to the government assistance on crop loan, has made farmers to plant most of the coco-based areas. It occupies an area of 586 hectares. Pineapple production is usually 18 to 20 months before it can be harvested.

==== Livestock/Poultry ====
The present livestock production is primarily on small-scale basis with mostly backyard farming except those who produce broilers, which range from 100 to 300 birds. Poultry such as native chicken are usually few in numbers per farmer and subsist on stray grain and grasses. Pest and diseases often attack the birds, thus dwindle the stock and produces low quality chickens.

Hogs are also a backyard activity. There are usually 1 to 2 stocks per farmer. The housing is built of light local materials. Breeding and inter-breeding with poor quality species results to a smaller and slower hog variety. Farmers cannot afford to have high quality breed because of high capital including the high cost of feeds and the risk in raising this kind of variety, thus diminishing the margin of profit.

=== Fisheries ===
The municipality has two coastal barangays namely: Taba-taba and Mangcamagong situated along the coast of San Miguel Bay. Most of the fishermen here are sustenance fishermen with limited fishing paraphernalia and few own fishing boats of three tons gross and less.

Fish caught in this area are customarily brought and hauled in Mercedes since most of these fishermen have consignment deals with fish dealers. Few are sold in Basud town proper through rigaton. The necessity to improve the road and market facilities will possibly change the trend of fish marketing here in Basud. Likewise, fishermen themselves could directly market their catch to Manila and command a higher price without so much cost on fuel.

=== Commerce ===
The municipality of Basud significantly improved for the last ten years in terms of commerce. The municipal officials focused their attention at the municipality public market as the center of commerce. It was established in 1990 seven fresh fish stalls, meat stalls, vegetables stalls, dried fish stalls, sari-sari stores, agricultural stall, hardware, drugstore, bakery and dry good stall.

Study reveals that occupants vacated their stalls due to poor or lack of patronage on the part of the people and an insufficient capital on the part of the stallholders.

=== Tourism ===
Basud, the gateway to the province of Camarines Norte has plenty of natural scenic spots which are comparable to other places. It has tranquil beaches like the Mangcamagong and Taba-taba, fresh and alluring waterfalls like San Pascual Falls and other awesome landmarks like Pinaglaban Shrine which symbolizes the Basudeños values of heroism, love of country and bravery. The Mother Tree which shows love to nature and environment.

Basud also depicts various by products of coconut which is one of the town's main products as well as the highlight of the Rahugan Festival which was the street dancing performances.

Other equally important sceneries both God-given and manmade like the Little Tagaytay Resort which is fast becoming haven to local and foreign tourists. The Basud river which was adjudged as the cleanest river in Bicol years back. But the center of all these is Saint Raphael the Archangel, the patron saint and the curator of all these things for Basudeños to enjoy the benefits from them and be proud of.

=== Other industries ===
Diatomaeous earth (white clay)

The municipality is rich in mineral resources such as diatomaceous earth (DE) or commonly called white clay. This is one of the income generating industries of the municipality. This non-metallic mineral can be found in barangays Caayunan, San Pascual, Oliva, and San Felipe. It has a total approximate reserve of 1,289,600 metric tons.

Gravel and sand

The municipality has a viable source of sand and gravel. The Bactas River located in Pagsangahan and Oliva is a source of mixed gravel and coarse aggregate. It is being extracted by mining concessionaries. Matnog is another source of construction aggregates including sand that is being extracted by the barangay people.

== Culture ==
=== Rahugan Festival ===
Rahugan is a part of the coconut, a tree of life which means the bunch of coconuts. This word signifies the legend of Basud. Before the Spanish conquistadores came to invade the place, the natives of Basud were living in clusters along deltas separated by creeks. Much to say that people in this place had their own distinct culture and civilization before they built their houses, mold their families, established a community and settled for a living.

It was a "Bukambibig" from among the elders of Basudeños that people of Basud came from one womb of family who were natives of Basud. And from among these families sprouted to be founders and leaders in the community since the spaniards took over the town. People are knitted into one family; a cousin on the other, or "malapit nam kamag-anak to another. With respect and modesty, there were families and inhabitants of Basud who were amusingly known by their aliases and related to coconut like the "Lunok", "Lukad", "Bunot", "Guta", "Bukhayo", and the well known "Buko-King. Prominent among the people of Basud the value of love, unity and sense of belongingness to the family. People fosters the sense of cooperation and solidarity. With these distinctive character, value, and culture of the people of Basud, a festival was conceived to portray the beautiful amusing, exciting and rich cultures of the Basudeños. This festival will vibrate the symbol of cultures, actions character and solidarity of the people how they dwelt in the place since the early times, now and the future.

== Infrastructure ==
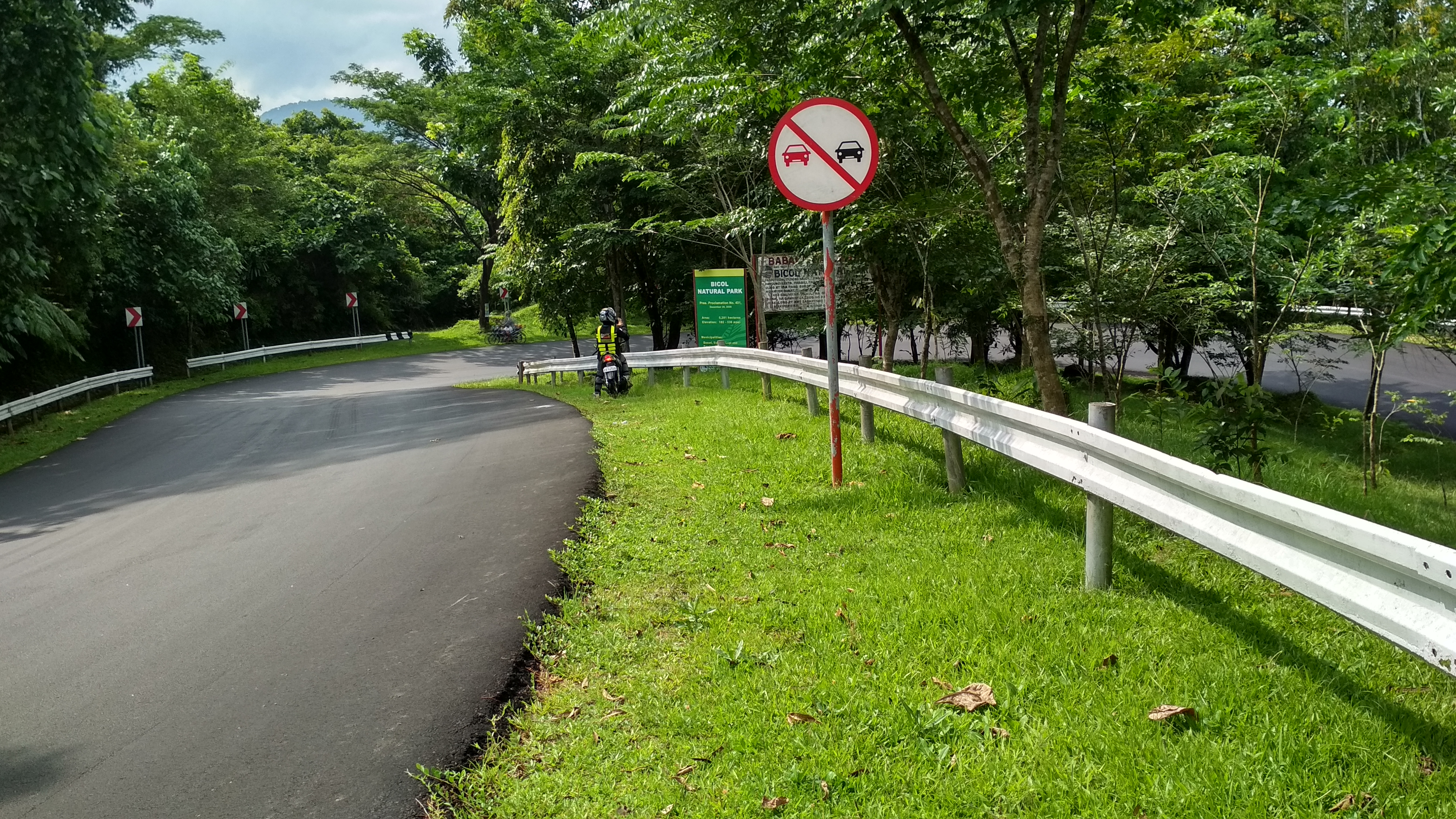
The "Bitukang Manok" Road

Transportation

Land transportation is the primary means of transporting people, goods and services from the barangay to the town proper of Basud. While sea transport is being used by the municipality's two coastal barangays, namely: Taba-taba and Mangcamagong, they often use during summer as an alternative route to the fishing town of Mercedes.

Roads

The municipal proper is being linked to its different barangays by the municipality's two major roads, namely the Maharlika Highway and the Mangcamagong provincial road. The Maharlika highway has a total length of 25.50 kilometers stretching from the boundary of the municipality of Daet to the Camarines Norte - Camarines Sur boundary. The Mangcamagong provincial road has a total length of 9.46 kilometers, stretching from the municipal boundary of Basud and Mercedes to the junction of Maharlika highway.

The municipality has a total road network of 138.057 kilometers composed of 25.50 kilometers of national highway and 23.16 kilometers of provincial roads including 83.481 kilometers of barangay roads and 5.956 kilometers of municipal streets.

Fish landing

Basud has fish ports serving the two coastal barangays of Mangcamagong and Taba-taba. To this date, said fish port that the government spent more than one million pesos cannot fully serve for its main purpose, first, due to its almost dilapidated structure and secondly, there is no big fishing vessels using the port.

Water supply

The different barangays of the municipality is being served by levels I, II and III water supply. As of 2001, serving with potable water is 4,110 households. CNWD was serving 2,558 households mostly in barangays Poblacion I, Poblacion II and part of barangays Matnog, Bactas and Mocong. The municipality's water consumers are consuming an average of 07.4 cubic meters per day. To cope with the consumption demand especially during summer, the CNWD has constructed an elevated water tank with a capacity of 200 cubic meters and implementing the “Tubig ng Buhay, Hatid sa Barangay” program.

Barangays San Pascual, Caayunan, Tuaca and San Felipe are being served by spring development. Other barangays are being served by shallow wells, deep wells or dug wells.

Power supply

Basud has been served by electric power, formerly by the defunct Hidalgo Electric Enterprise, now by the National Power Corporation through the Camarines Norte Electric Cooperative (CANORECO). After the establishment of this cooperative, there was a great improvement in terms of power supply condition in the municipality.

Communication

Basud has a telecommunication system that is being run by one personnel of the Department of Transportation and Communication (DOTC). There are two satellites of Smart and Globe in Poblacion II. There is postal office and has a staff of one mail carriers serving all barangays in the municipality. These personnel cannot adequately serve the entire from the lack of personnel; another problem is the difficulty in the delivery of mails in the remote and far-flung barangays.

== Education ==
The Basud Schools District Office governs all educational institutions within the municipality. It oversees the management and operations of all private and public, from primary to secondary schools.

The municipality has 26 elementary schools, two National High Schools and 31 Day Care Centers. Barangay Caayunan has two elementary schools while barangays Mantugawe, Binatagan and Manmuntay have none. There are four High School namely: Basud National High School at Poblacion Uno and Amoguis, San Felipe National High School at Barangay San Felipe, Tuaca National High at Barangay Tuaca and Dominador Narido High School at Barangay Taisan.

=== Primary and elementary schools ===
- Angas Elementary School
- Balce Elementary School
- Basud Advent Institute
- Basud Central School
- Basud Parochial School
- Briñas Elementary School
- Caayunan Elementary School
- Christian Foundational Learning Center
- Don Juan Pimentel Elementary School
- Fulgueras Elementary School
- Guinatungan Elementary School
- Hinampacan Elementary School
- Langa Elementary School
- Mampili Elementary School
- Mandazo Elementary School
- Mangcamagong Elementary School
- Matnog Elementary School
- Mocong Elementary School
- Oliva Elementary School
- Pedro Rada Elementary School
- Pinagwarasan Elementary School
- Plaridel Elementary School
- Primo R. Samonte Elementary School
- San Felipe Elementary School
- San Jose Elementary School
- Taba-Taba Elementary School
- Tacad Elementary School
- Tuaca Elementary School

=== Secondary schools ===
- Basud National High School
- Dominador Narido High School
- Pagsangahan Integrated School
- San Felipe National High School
- Tuaca High School
