= San Vicente, Camarines Norte =

Municipality in Camarines Norte, Philippines

San Vicente
- Municipality
- Municipality of San Vicente
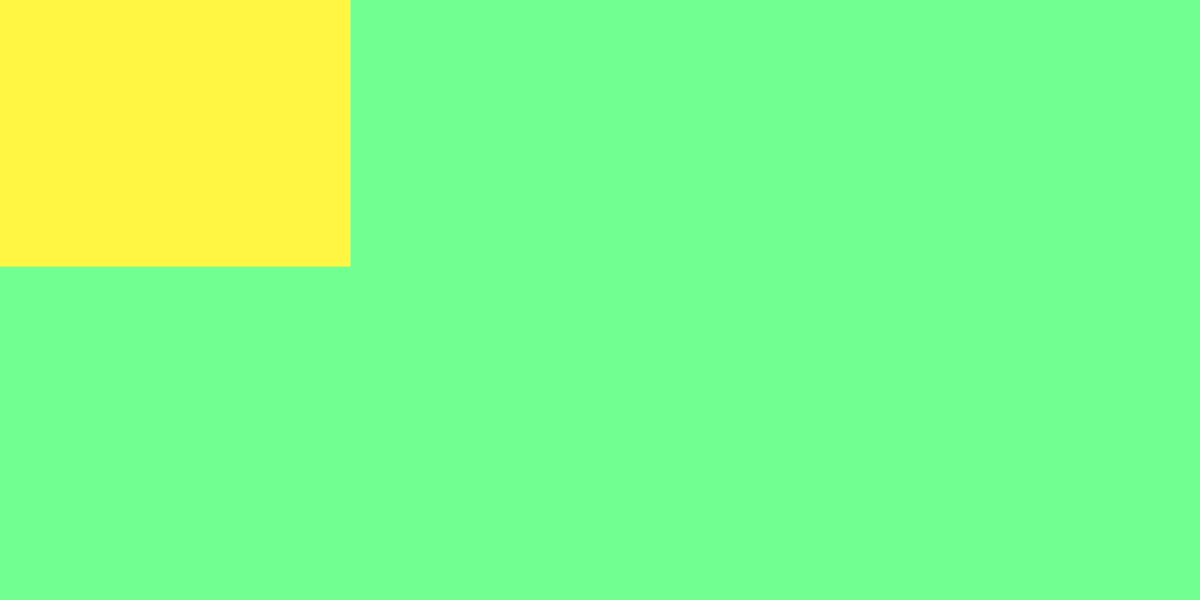
- Flag

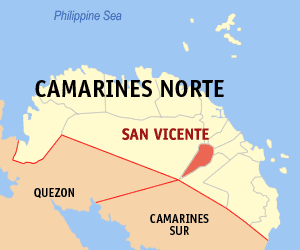
- Map of Camarines Norte with San Vicente highlighted
- Interactive map of San Vicente
- Location within the Philippines
- Coordinates: 14°06′22″N 122°52′24″E
- Country: Philippines
- Region: Bicol Region
- Province: Camarines Norte
- District: 2nd district
- Founded: 1771
- Named for: Saint Vincent Ferrer
- Barangays: 9 (see Barangays)

Government
  - Type: Sangguniang Bayan
  - Mayor: Mariano E. Palma
  - Vice Mayor: Joseph Stanley G. Alegre
  - Representative: Rosemarie C. Panotes
  - Municipal Council: Members: Billyboy Palma; James Patrick A. Alegre; Analet G. Villamin; Emmanuel R. Opeda; Bobby Rico G. Aguilar; Luisito G. Bobis; Rodel Fulgencio; Sonny E. Cortez
  - Electorate: 9,481 voters (2025)

Area
  - Total: 57.49 km^{2} (22.20 sq mi)
- Elevation: 62 m (203 ft)
- Highest elevation: 672 m (2,205 ft)
- Lowest elevation: 6 m (20 ft)

Population (2024 census)
  - Total: 11,774
  - Density: 204.8/km^{2} (530.4/sq mi)
  - Households: 2,858

Economy
  - Income class: 4th municipal income class
  - Poverty incidence: 18.74% (2023)
  - Revenue: ₱ 105.1 million (2024)
  - Assets: ₱ 279.9 million (2024)
  - Expenditure: ₱ 94.3 million (2024)
  - Liabilities: ₱ 127.2 million (2024)

Service provider
  - Electricity: Camarines Norte Electric Cooperative (CANORECO)
- Time zone: UTC+8 (PST)
- ZIP code: 4609
- PSGC: 0501609000
- IDD : area code: +63 (0)54
- Native languages: Central Bikol; Tagalog

San Vicente, officially the Municipality of San Vicente (Tagalog: Bayan ng San Vicente), is a municipality in the province of Camarines Norte, Philippines. According to the 2024 census, it has a population of 11,774 people, making it the least populated municipality in the province.

== Geography ==
=== Barangays ===
San Vicente is politically subdivided into 9 barangays. Each barangay consists of puroks and some have sitios.

In 1955, the barrio of Iraya Norte was renamed to San Jose.

- Asdum
- Cabanbanan
- Calabagas
- Fabrica
- Iraya Sur
- Kanluran (Poblacion)
- Man-Ogob
- San Jose
- Silangan (Poblacion)

=== Climate ===
Climate data for San Vicente, Camarines Norte
Month	Jan	Feb	Mar	Apr	May	Jun	Jul	Aug	Sep	Oct	Nov	Dec	Year
Mean daily maximum °C (°F)	26 (79)	26 (79)	28 (82)	30 (86)	30 (86)	29 (84)	28 (82)	28 (82)	28 (82)	28 (82)	27 (81)	26 (79)	28 (82)
Mean daily minimum °C (°F)	22 (72)	21 (70)	22 (72)	22 (72)	24 (75)	24 (75)	24 (75)	24 (75)	24 (75)	23 (73)	23 (73)	22 (72)	23 (73)
Average precipitation mm (inches)	85 (3.3)	55 (2.2)	53 (2.1)	47 (1.9)	112 (4.4)	156 (6.1)	213 (8.4)	159 (6.3)	201 (7.9)	216 (8.5)	197 (7.8)	141 (5.6)	1,635 (64.5)
Average rainy days	15.4	11.6	13.6	12.3	19.9	23.7	27.3	26.0	26.0	24.6	21.8	19.1	241.3
Source: Meteoblue

== Demographics ==
Population census of San Vicente
Year	Pop.	±% p.a.
1903	1,552	—
1918	1,802	+1.00%
1939	1,960	+0.40%
1948	2,811	+4.09%
1960	4,308	+3.62%
1970	5,914	+3.22%
1975	6,330	+1.37%
1980	6,577	+0.77%
1990	7,321	+1.08%
1995	8,220	+2.19%
2000	8,984	+1.92%
2007	9,615	+0.94%
2010	10,114	+1.86%
2015	10,396	+0.53%
2020	12,579	+4.09%
2024	11,774	−1.58%
Source: Philippine Statistics Authority

In the 2024 census, the population of San Vicente was 11,774 people, with a density of 200 inhabitants per square kilometre or 520 inhabitants per square mile.

== Economy ==
Poverty incidence of San Vicente (%)

Source: Philippine Statistics Authority

== Tourism ==
The Mananap Falls is approximately 20–25 ft tall, tucked inside the thick forest and mountains. The water was ice cold there is a small raft tied which will lead you near the falls and a ladder to get to the top of the falls. There is a jumping point as well.

== Culture ==
In 2025, the town brought back its traditional summer kite flying activity as part of the Mananap Festival, with plans to make it a regular feature in future celebrations.

== Education ==
The San Vicente-San Lorenzo Ruiz Schools District Office governs all educational institutions within the municipality. It oversees the management and operations of all private and public, from primary to secondary schools.

=== Primary and elementary schools ===
- Imelda Elementary School
- Maisog Elementary School
- Mampurog Elementary School
- Manlimonsito Elementary School
- Pulantuna Elementary School
- Resettlement Elementary School
- S. Delos Santos Elementary School
- Salvacion (B) Elementary School
- Salvacion (S) Elementary School
- San Isidro Elementary School
- San Ramon Elementary School

=== Secondary schools ===
- San Isidro High School
- San Lorenzo Ruiz National High School
