= Padilla =

Padilla may refer to:

== People ==
- Padilla (surname)
  - Padilla family, a prominent Filipino family of politicians and actors
  - José Padilla Sr. (1888–1945), Filipino lawyer, politician and actor
    - Carlos Padilla Sr. (1909–1964), Filipino boxer, actor and filmmaker
    - Carlos Padilla Jr. (born 1934), Filipino actor and boxing referee
    - Gino Padilla (born 1964), Filipino singer and songwriter
    - José Padilla Jr. (1911–1979), Filipino actor
    - Roy Padilla Sr. (1926–1988), Filipino politician and actor
      - Daniel Padilla (born 1995), Filipino actor
      - Kylie Padilla (born 1993), Filipino actress
      - RJ Padilla (born 1989), Filipino actor and comedian
      - Robin Padilla (born 1969), Filipino actor, ex-convict and politician; incumbent senator
      - Rommel Padilla (born 1965), Filipino actor and politician
      - Ricarte Padilla (born 1965), Filipino politician
    - Zsa Zsa Padilla (born 1964), Filipino actress

== Places ==
- Padilla Municipality, Tamaulipas, in the Mexican state of Tamaulipas
- Padilla, Cauca, in Colombia
- Padilla, Bolivia
- Moises Padilla, Negros Occidental, in the Philippines
- Padilla Bay, in the U.S. state of Washington
- Padilla de Abajo, in Spain
- Padilla de Arriba, in Spain

== Other uses ==
- Padilla v. Kentucky, a United States Supreme Court case pertaining to the immigration consequences faced by lawful permanent residents who are convicted of crimes, and their rights to be warned of those consequences
- Rumsfeld v. Padilla, a United States Supreme Court case pertaining to the War on Terror and defendant José Padilla
- Padilla (cigar brand), a brand of cigars launched in 2003 by Ernesto Padilla
- Padilla (spider), a genus of jumping spiders
- Almirante Padilla-class frigate, a class of four ships of the Colombian Navy
