= Eva Cariño =

Filpino actress; mother of Robin Padilla

- Born: Lolita Rivera Cariño; March 23, 1936 (age 90)
- Occupation: Actress
- Years active: 1955–1961; 1995–1999
- Spouse: Roy Padilla Sr. (died 1988)
- Children: 10 (inc. Rommel, Rustom, and Robin)
- Relatives: Padilla family Bela Padilla (grandniece)

Lolita Rivera Cariño-Padilla (born March 23, 1936), professionally known as Eva Cariño, is a former Filipino actress. She is the mother of actors Robin Padilla, Rommel Padilla, Royette Padilla and BB Gandanghari.

== Early life ==
Eva Cariño was born on March 23, 1936, and raised in the provincial town of Cuyapo, Nueva Ecija.

Prior to entering the film industry, she was fond of watching films starring Rogelio de la Rosa and Elsa Oria.

== Career ==
At the age of 16, Cariño moved to Manila in 1952 to find an opportunity to become an actress in the film industry, with her sister's father-in-law, July Hidalgo, being a sound engineer for LVN Pictures. After being noticed by composer Juan Silos, she was hired and groomed as an actress for LVN.

After starring in supporting roles for films such as Ang Ibong Adarna (lit. 'The Adarna bird'), Salamangkero (both 1955), and Everlasting (1956), she was intended to star in her first lead role for Manuel Conde's film Krus Na Kawayan (lit. 'Bamboo Cross'), a Vietnamese-Philippine co-production, but had to back out due to her "weak heart". In 1958, Consuelo "Ateng" Osorio, who was the neighbor of Cariño's sister, recommended her to Roy Padilla Sr., Osorio's brother, upon which she was cast in a lead role for the anthology film Taginting under the name Eva Rivera and opposite Padilla's brother Amado Cortez. However, due to Padilla's strict demands as director, Cariño nearly walked out of the set, and convinced Osorio to direct her scenes instead.

In 1984, Cariño produced a concert in Baguio for Holy Week, headlined by Basil Valdez and Joey Albert. It was during the concert that her teenage son Robin Padilla was introduced to filmmaker Deo J. Fajardo Jr., who later assisted Padilla in becoming an actor in the film industry despite his father's disapproval.

In 1995, Cariño was cast in Fajardo's film Anak, Pagsubok Lamang ng Diyos alongside her son Robin, who was then serving a 17-year jail term at the New Bilibid Prison where the film was largely shot.

== Personal life ==
Cariño married Roy Padilla Sr., an actor, director, and civic leader who served as OIC governor of Camarines Norte from 1986 until his assassination during the gubernatorial election in January 1988. The couple had a total of ten children: Rowena (born 1959), Randolf ("Randy", died 1980s), Rema, Roy ("Royette"), Roda, Rommel (born 1965), BB Gandanghari (formerly Rustom; born 1967), Robinhood ("Robin", born 1969), Richelda (born 1971), and Romulus (died at four days old in 1975). In spite of their marriage, Padilla had dozens of other children with other women.

Cariño own's a farm in her town of Cuyapo, Nueva Ecija.

Cariño and her family have been practicing members of Jehovah's Witnesses, with Cariño raising her children in the faith and serving as a preacher into the 2000s. Cariño has been outspoken about her support for her sons in the film industry. She attested to reporter Jessica Soho in 1995 that Robin slashed his wrists in a suicide attempt after hearing the guilty verdicts in his court cases in 1994, and argued before senators for her son to not be imprisoned under a martial law-era decree: "We're no longer under martial law, Robin did not kill anyone. But if he did hurt or kill anyone with his guns, then I'll be the first one to send him to jail. But he did not."

By 2025, her son Robin revealed during his privilege speech at the Senate that Cariño has advanced dementia. He later cited his brother Royette's death in February 2021 as the time when Cariño began growing weaker, with Cariño soon having dementia, with Padilla stating that she often cried due to mostly remembering the bad moments in her family's life.

== Filmography ==
Year	Title	Role	Note(s)	Ref(s).
1955	Ang Ibong Adarna			
1955	Salamangkero			
1956	Everlasting			
1958	Taginting ng Pilak			
1961	Noli Me Tángere			
1996	Anak, Pagsubok Lamang ng Diyos	Aling Edna	as Eva Cariño Padilla	
1996	Santo-Santito: Anak ni Baby Ama 2		as Eva Cariño Padilla	
1999	Kumakasa... Lumalaban	Doña Virgiña	as Eva Cariño Padilla	
