= 2010 Bicol Region local elections =

Local elections were held in the Bicol Region on May 10, 2010, as part of the 2010 Philippine general election.

== Albay ==
=== Governor ===
Incumbent Governor Joey Salceda of Lakas–Kampi–CMD won re-election to a second term.

Candidate	Party	Votes	%
Joey Salceda	Lakas–Kampi–CMD	466,605	95.30
Maria Linda Montayre	Kapayapaan, Kaunlaran at Katarungan	17,638	3.60
Marcelino Gallardo	Philippine Green Republican Party	5,397	1.10
Total		489,640	100.00
Valid votes		489,640	85.62
Invalid/blank votes		82,245	14.38
Total votes		571,885	100.00
Lakas–Kampi–CMD hold			
Source: Commission on Elections

=== Vice Governor ===
Incumbent Vice Governor Brando Sael of the Nacionalista Party ran for the House of Representatives in Albay's 3rd district. The Nacionalista Party nominated provincial board member Jesus Calisin, who was defeated by provincial board member Harold Imperial of Lakas–Kampi–CMD.

Candidate	Party	Votes	%
Harold Imperial	Lakas–Kampi–CMD	185,330	40.69
Jesus Calisin	Nacionalista Party	142,287	31.24
Raul Borejon	Independent	116,122	25.49
Gil Goyena	Independent	11,757	2.58
Total		455,496	100.00
Valid votes		455,496	79.65
Invalid/blank votes		116,389	20.35
Total votes		571,885	100.00
Lakas–Kampi–CMD gain from Nacionalista Party			
Source: Commission on Elections

=== Provincial Board ===
The Albay Provincial Board is composed of 13 board members, 10 of whom are elected.

Party	Votes	%	Seats
Lakas–Kampi–CMD	651,741	55.91	6
Nacionalista Party	215,213	18.46	1
Liberal Party	122,358	10.50	2
Nationalist People's Coalition	60,233	5.17	0
Independent	116,145	9.96	1
Total	1,165,690	100.00	10
Total votes	571,885	–	
Source: Commission on Elections

==== 1st district ====
Candidate	Party	Votes	%
Baby Glenda Bongao	Lakas–Kampi–CMD	80,358	23.03
Richard Venancio Ziga	Liberal Party	61,688	17.68
Job Belen	Liberal Party	43,687	12.52
Joephil Bien	Lakas–Kampi–CMD	42,694	12.24
Felipe Berces	Lakas–Kampi–CMD	42,659	12.23
Rodolfo Cao Jr.	Independent	29,799	8.54
Randy Blanza	Independent	17,647	5.06
Fabiola Melgar	Liberal Party	16,983	4.87
Vicente Bilangel	Nacionalista Party	13,337	3.82
Total		348,852	100.00
Total votes		164,903	–
Source: Commission on Elections

==== 2nd district ====
Candidate	Party	Votes	%
Neil Montallana	Lakas–Kampi–CMD	95,162	25.92
Ralph Andes	Nacionalista Party	84,088	22.91
Niño Imperial	Lakas–Kampi–CMD	70,071	19.09
Ostiano Calleja	Lakas–Kampi–CMD	68,952	18.78
Jose Maria Los Baños	Nacionalista Party	38,614	10.52
Poulien Aguilar	Independent	10,214	2.78
Total		367,101	100.00
Total votes		202,751	–
Source: Commission on Elections

==== 3rd district ====
Candidate	Party	Votes	%
Ramon Alsua	Lakas–Kampi–CMD	80,662	17.94
Irineo Sales Jr.	Lakas–Kampi–CMD	68,435	15.22
Herbert Borja	Lakas–Kampi–CMD	63,795	14.18
Arnold Embestro	Independent	39,295	8.74
Arecio Rendor Jr.	Lakas–Kampi–CMD	38,953	8.66
Benjamin Matias	Nationalist People's Coalition	36,580	8.13
Vida Maria Corazon Aurelio	Nacionalista Party	32,351	7.19
Ruben Olavario	Nacionalista Party	27,137	6.03
Ma. Jessica Redrico	Nationalist People's Coalition	23,653	5.26
Salvador Robrigado	Nacionalista Party	19,686	4.38
Pio Fructuoso Duran	Independent	19,190	4.27
Total		449,737	100.00
Total votes		204,231	–
Source: Commission on Elections

== Camarines Norte ==
=== Governor ===
Incumbent Governor Edgar Tallado of the Liberal Party was elected to a first full term.

Candidate	Party	Votes	%
Edgar Tallado	Liberal Party	66,784	34.09
Winifredo Oco	Lakas–Kampi–CMD	66,626	34.00
Casimiro Roy Padilla Jr.	Pwersa ng Masang Pilipino	62,523	31.91
Total		195,933	100.00
Valid votes		195,933	94.28
Invalid/blank votes		11,884	5.72
Total votes		207,817	100.00
Liberal Party hold			
Source: Commission on Elections

=== Vice Governor ===
Incumbent Vice Governor Casimiro Roy Padilla Jr. of Pwersa ng Masang Pilipino (PMP) ran for Governor of Camarines Norte. The PMP nominated Senen Jerez, who was defeated by provincial board member Jonah Pedro Pimentel of Lakas–Kampi–CMD.

Candidate	Party	Votes	%
Jonah Pedro Pimentel	Lakas–Kampi–CMD	80,898	44.65
Senen Jerez	Pwersa ng Masang Pilipino	53,054	29.28
William Lim	Liberal Party	47,218	26.06
Total		181,170	100.00
Valid votes		181,170	87.18
Invalid/blank votes		26,647	12.82
Total votes		207,817	100.00
Lakas–Kampi–CMD gain from Pwersa ng Masang Pilipino			
Source: Commission on Elections

=== Provincial Board ===
The Camarines Norte Provincial Board is composed of 13 board members, 10 of whom are elected.

Party	Votes	%	Seats
Lakas–Kampi–CMD	367,973	51.27	7
Liberal Party	280,794	39.13	3
Pwersa ng Masang Pilipino	64,288	8.96	0
Independent	4,617	0.64	0
Total	717,672	100.00	10
Total votes	207,817	–	
Source: Commission on Elections

==== 1st district ====
Candidate	Party	Votes	%
Teresita Malubay	Lakas–Kampi–CMD	43,930	13.54
Erwin Lausin	Lakas–Kampi–CMD	40,028	12.34
Joeffrey Pandi	Lakas–Kampi–CMD	35,841	11.05
Godfrey Parale	Lakas–Kampi–CMD	35,606	10.97
Edgar Dasco	Liberal Party	34,094	10.51
Elpidio Tenorio	Liberal Party	32,108	9.89
Artemio Andaya Jr.	Liberal Party	30,119	9.28
Angelo Timoteo Molina	Lakas–Kampi–CMD	24,993	7.70
Esperanza Carmela Padilla	Pwersa ng Masang Pilipino	21,730	6.70
Sherwin Mata	Liberal Party	21,430	6.60
Romulo Rocas	Independent	4,617	1.42
Total		324,496	100.00
Total votes		96,700	–
Source: Commission on Elections

==== 2nd district ====
Candidate	Party	Votes	%
Ruth Herrera	Lakas–Kampi–CMD	53,961	13.72
Rodolfo Gache	Lakas–Kampi–CMD	49,961	12.71
Romeo Marmol	Liberal Party	44,631	11.35
Ligaya Pedron	Liberal Party	36,569	9.30
Gerardo Quiñones	Lakas–Kampi–CMD	35,387	9.00
Samuel King	Liberal Party	29,626	7.54
Joel Segundo	Liberal Party	27,276	6.94
Marlon Bandelaria	Lakas–Kampi–CMD	25,560	6.50
Corazon Bacerdo	Liberal Party	24,941	6.34
Guillermo Balce	Lakas–Kampi–CMD	22,706	5.78
Santiago Turingan	Pwersa ng Masang Pilipino	20,679	5.26
Agustin Mago	Pwersa ng Masang Pilipino	12,256	3.12
Ferdinand Chua	Pwersa ng Masang Pilipino	9,623	2.45
Total		393,176	100.00
Total votes		111,117	–
Source: Commission on Elections

== Camarines Sur ==
=== Governor ===
Incumbent Governor Luis Raymund Villafuerte of Nacionalista Party won his re-election to a second term.

Candidate	Party	Votes	%
Luis Raymund Villafuerte	Nacionalista Party	400,690	67.71
Felix Alfelor Jr.	Lakas–Kampi–CMD	191,066	32.29
Total		591,756	100.00
Valid votes		591,756	90.49
Invalid/blank votes		62,208	9.51
Total votes		653,964	100.00
Nacionalista Party hold			
Source: Commission on Elections

=== Vice Governor ===
Incumbent Vice Governor Salvio Fortuno ran for the House of Representatives in Camarines Sur's 5th district. His party, Nacionalista Party nominated Fortunato Peña. Peña would later won the election.

Candidate	Party	Votes	%
Fortunato Peña	Nacionalista Party	303,419	61.26
Elmo Bombase	Lakas–Kampi–CMD	167,802	33.88
Carlomagno Batalla	Lapiang Manggagawa	24,045	4.85
Total		495,266	100.00
Valid votes		495,266	75.73
Invalid/blank votes		158,698	24.27
Total votes		653,964	100.00
Nacionalista Party hold			
Source: Commission on Elections

=== Provincial Board ===
The Camarines Sur Provincial Board is composed of 13 board members, 10 of whom are elected.

Party	Votes	%	Seats
Nacionalista Party	402,195	42.56	6
Lakas–Kampi–CMD	327,842	34.69	1
Nationalist People's Coalition	214,908	22.74	3
Total	944,945	100.00	10
Total votes	653,964	–	
Source: Commission on Elections

==== 1st district ====
Candidate	Party	Votes	%
Warren Señar	Nacionalista Party	32,213	52.32
Theresa dela Peña	Lakas–Kampi–CMD	29,354	47.68
Total		61,567	100.00
Valid votes		61,567	82.51
Invalid/blank votes		13,050	17.49
Total votes		74,617	100.00
Source: Commission on Elections

==== 2nd district ====
Candidate	Party	Votes	%
Romulo Hernandez	Nacionalista Party	54,230	31.28
Darius Nopra	Nacionalista Party	47,727	27.53
Stanley Dy	Lakas–Kampi–CMD	36,319	20.95
Juan Jingo Bagadion	Lakas–Kampi–CMD	35,086	20.24
Total		173,362	100.00
Total votes		118,871	–
Source: Commission on Elections

==== 3rd district ====
Candidate	Party	Votes	%
Charina Pante	Nationalist People's Coalition	50,123	29.18
Angel Naval	Nacionalista Party	40,508	23.58
Philip Salvador Señar	Nacionalista Party	39,718	23.12
Irvin Doroteo Ayo	Nationalist People's Coalition	25,426	14.80
Levi Sta. Ana Jr.	Lakas–Kampi–CMD	16,025	9.33
Total		171,800	100.00
Total votes		118,681	–
Source: Commission on Elections

==== 4th district ====
Candidate	Party	Votes	%
Emmanuel Llaguno	Nationalist People's Coalition	76,616	42.77
Rosito Velarde	Nationalist People's Coalition	62,743	35.02
Raymundo Dizon	Lakas–Kampi–CMD	39,785	22.21
Total		179,144	100.00
Total votes		160,169	–
Source: Commission on Elections

==== 5th district ====
Candidate	Party	Votes	%
Ruperto Alfelor	Lakas–Kampi–CMD	79,390	22.11
Wilfredo Rex Oliva	Nacionalista Party	67,650	18.84
Rudito Espiritu Jr.	Nacionalista Party	66,462	18.51
Emmanuel Noble	Nacionalista Party	53,687	14.95
Sofronio Magistrado	Lakas–Kampi–CMD	50,195	13.98
Norman Eduardo Badiola	Lakas–Kampi–CMD	41,688	11.61
Total		359,072	100.00
Total votes		181,626	–
Source: Commission on Elections

== Catanduanes ==
=== Governor ===
Incumbent Governor Joseph Cua of the Nacionalista Party won re-election to a second term.

Candidate	Party	Votes	%
Joseph Cua	Nacionalista Party	71,813	60.93
Joseph Santiago	Nationalist People's Coalition	44,212	37.51
Salvador Gianan	Kilusang Bagong Lipunan	1,071	0.91
Manuel Montarde	Philippine Green Republican Party	764	0.65
Total		117,860	100.00
Valid votes		117,860	90.41
Invalid/blank votes		12,506	9.59
Total votes		130,366	100.00
Nacionalista Party hold			
Source: Commission on Elections

=== Vice Governor ===
Incumbent Vice Governor Alfred Aquino of the Nationalist People's Coalition ran for re-election to a second term, but was defeated by Baras mayor Jose Teves Jr. of Lakas–Kampi–CMD.

Candidate	Party	Votes	%
Jose Teves Jr.	Lakas–Kampi–CMD	53,274	47.40
Vincent Villaluna	Nacionalista Party	41,003	36.48
Alfred Aquino	Nationalist People's Coalition	18,125	16.13
Total		112,402	100.00
Valid votes		112,402	86.22
Invalid/blank votes		17,964	13.78
Total votes		130,366	100.00
Lakas–Kampi–CMD gain from Nationalist People's Coalition			
Source: Commission on Elections

=== Provincial Board ===
The Catanduanes Provincial Board is composed of 11 board members, 8 of whom are elected.

Party	Votes	%	Seats
Nacionalista Party	136,636	40.93	4
Lakas–Kampi–CMD	61,884	18.54	1
Nationalist People's Coalition	61,765	18.50	2
Philippine Green Republican Party	15,042	4.51	0
Liberal Party	9,947	2.98	0
Independent	48,569	14.55	1
Total	333,843	100.00	8
Total votes	130,366	–	
Source: Commission on Elections

==== 1st district ====
Candidate	Party	Votes	%
Nel Asanza	Independent	33,987	19.69
Rafael Zuniega	Nacionalista Party	32,555	18.86
Shirley Abundo	Lakas–Kampi–CMD	30,401	17.61
Jose Romeo Francisco	Nationalist People's Coalition	25,685	14.88
Ariel Molina	Nationalist People's Coalition	17,622	10.21
Jesus Albaniel	Independent	10,771	6.24
Evelyn Gutierrez	Nacionalista Party	9,368	5.43
Jose Karlo Tatad	Nacionalista Party	5,049	2.93
Vicente Samonte	Lakas–Kampi–CMD	3,363	1.95
Gerardo Wilfredo Alberto	Independent	2,092	1.21
Roberto Lopez	Independent	1,719	1.00
Total		172,612	100.00
Total votes		66,000	–
Source: Commission on Elections

==== 2nd district ====
Candidate	Party	Votes	%
Edwin Tanael	Nacionalista Party	30,606	18.98
Wilfredo Santelices	Nacionalista Party	22,158	13.74
Roger Pereyra	Nacionalista Party	21,082	13.08
Marilyn Tatel	Nationalist People's Coalition	18,458	11.45
Rene Vega	Nacionalista Party	15,818	9.81
Lilia Evangelista	Lakas–Kampi–CMD	13,169	8.17
Carlos Aguilar	Philippine Green Republican Party	10,161	6.30
Rogelio Alcantara	Liberal Party	9,947	6.17
David Guerrero Jr.	Lakas–Kampi–CMD	8,986	5.57
Domingo Tejerero	Lakas–Kampi–CMD	5,965	3.70
Prospero Verceles	Philippine Green Republican Party	3,389	2.10
James Bonifacio	Philippine Green Republican Party	1,492	0.93
Total		161,231	100.00
Total votes		64,366	–
Source: Commission on Elections

== Masbate ==
=== Governor ===
Incumbent Governor Elisa Olga Kho of Lakas–Kampi–CMD ran for re-election to a second term, but was defeated by representative Rizalina Lanete of the Nationalist People's Coalition.

Candidate	Party	Votes	%
Rizalina Lanete	Nationalist People's Coalition	162,251	52.69
Elisa Olga Kho	Lakas–Kampi–CMD	139,712	45.37
Judith Espinosa	Independent	5,962	1.94
Total		307,925	100.00
Valid votes		307,925	88.25
Invalid/blank votes		41,004	11.75
Total votes		348,929	100.00
Nationalist People's Coalition gain from Lakas–Kampi–CMD			
Source: Commission on Elections

=== Vice Governor ===
Incumbent Vice Governor Vicente Homer Revil of the Nationalist People's Coalition won re-election to a second term.

Candidate	Party	Votes	%
Vicente Homer Revil	Nationalist People's Coalition	170,003	63.98
Jamon Espares	Nacionalista Party	95,707	36.02
Total		265,710	100.00
Valid votes		265,710	76.15
Invalid/blank votes		83,219	23.85
Total votes		348,929	100.00
Nationalist People's Coalition hold			
Source: Commission on Elections

=== Provincial Board ===
The Masbate Provincial Board is composed of 13 board members, 10 of whom are elected.

Party	Votes	%	Seats
Lakas–Kampi–CMD	279,282	38.02	3
Nationalist People's Coalition	199,772	27.19	3
Nacionalista Party	92,406	12.58	2
Pwersa ng Masang Pilipino	69,364	9.44	1
Liberal Party	14,535	1.98	0
Philippine Green Republican Party	6,090	0.83	0
Independent	73,183	9.96	1
Total	734,632	100.00	10
Total votes	348,929	–	
Source: Commission on Elections

==== 1st district ====
Candidate	Party	Votes	%
Alfredo Alim Jr.	Lakas–Kampi–CMD	23,430	24.36
Cherry Abapo	Nacionalista Party	16,673	17.33
Gil Geñorga Jr.	Lakas–Kampi–CMD	16,562	17.22
Santiago Yap Jr.	Pwersa ng Masang Pilipino	16,009	16.64
Federico Serra	Pwersa ng Masang Pilipino	12,821	13.33
Roger Rapsing	Nacionalista Party	7,145	7.43
Antonio Mendoza Jr.	Nacionalista Party	3,560	3.70
Total		96,200	100.00
Total votes		77,776	–
Source: Commission on Elections

==== 2nd district ====
Candidate	Party	Votes	%
Julius Tuason	Lakas–Kampi–CMD	58,852	19.36
Lovely Abapo	Nacionalista Party	49,360	16.23
Juan Sanchez Sr.	Independent	40,783	13.41
Enrique Legaspi III	Pwersa ng Masang Pilipino	40,534	13.33
Silas Laurio	Lakas–Kampi–CMD	38,537	12.67
Maria Victoria Aguilar	Nationalist People's Coalition	25,015	8.23
Eugene Abelita	Independent	24,923	8.20
Elenterio Castillo	Nacionalista Party	15,668	5.15
Gil Bayaban Jr.	Independent	7,477	2.46
Edgardo Tatoy	Philippine Green Republican Party	2,910	0.96
Total		304,059	100.00
Total votes		134,836	–
Source: Commission on Elections

==== 3rd district ====
Candidate	Party	Votes	%
Albert Vincent Chu	Nationalist People's Coalition	58,605	17.53
John Henry Naga	Lakas–Kampi–CMD	53,217	15.92
Hamilcar Arregadas II	Nationalist People's Coalition	42,486	12.71
Ricar Vasquez	Nationalist People's Coalition	41,342	12.36
Rhodora Rey	Nationalist People's Coalition	32,324	9.67
Ramon Diamos	Lakas–Kampi–CMD	31,174	9.32
Siegfred Santor	Lakas–Kampi–CMD	28,984	8.67
Ansbert Son	Lakas–Kampi–CMD	28,526	8.53
Carlos Tolibas	Liberal Party	8,257	2.47
Rudy Abenir	Liberal Party	6,278	1.88
Antonio Almocera	Philippine Green Republican Party	3,180	0.95
Total		334,373	100.00
Total votes		136,317	–
Source: Commission on Elections

== Naga ==
=== Mayor ===
Incumbent Mayor Jesse Robredo of the Liberal Party was term-limited. The Liberal Party nominated city councilor John Bongat, who won the election against Adan Botor of the Nacionalista Party, former representative Sulpicio Roco Jr. of Aksyon Demokratiko, and independent candidates Roderick Olea and Luis Ortega.

=== Vice Mayor ===
Incumbent Vice Mayor Gabriel Bordado of the Liberal Party won re-election to a third term against Benjamin Lucena Jr. of the Nationalist People's Coalition and independent candidate Irineo Llorin Jr.

=== City Council ===
The Naga City Council is composed of 12 city councilors, 10 of whom are elected.

The following candidates were elected as city councilors.

- Cecilia de Asis (Liberal Party)
- Nelson Legacion (Liberal Party)
- Esteban Abonal Jr. (Liberal Party)
- David Casper Nathan Sergio (Liberal Party)
- Maria Elizabeth Lavadia (Liberal Party)
- Ray-an Cydrick Rentoy (Liberal Party)
- Jose Tuason (Liberal Party)
- Salvador del Castillo (Liberal Party)
- Joaquin Perez Jr. (Liberal Party)
- Raoul Rosales (Liberal Party)

The following also ran as candidates in the city council election.

- Jessie Albeus (Nationalist People's Coalition)
- Francis Jake Fortaleza (Nationalist People's Coalition)
- Joel Morano (Aksyon Demokratiko)
- Francia Teresa Rivera (Nationalist People's Coalition)
- Victor Cabrera (Aksyon Demokratiko)
- Jose Peñas III (Nationalist People's Coalition)
- Josue Perez Sr. (Nationalist People's Coalition)
- Edwin Felipe Hidalgo (Nationalist People's Coalition)
- Rowena Decena (Nationalist People's Coalition)
- Ernesto Abragan (Nationalist People's Coalition)
- Marlon Nasol (Nationalist People's Coalition)
- Nelson Pelagio (Nationalist People's Coalition)
- Juan Venancio Decena (Lakas–Kampi–CMD)
- Jose Jacobo Sr. (Independent)
- Maria Lilia Aracosta (Lakas–Kampi–CMD)
- Rodolfo Bongapat (Independent)
- Paul Niño Aguilar (Independent)
- Roland Moreno (Independent)
- Domingo Cantillo (Independent)
- Charlemagne Seechung (Independent)
- Virginia Ida Tindugan (Independent)
- Felix Riva (Independent)

== Sorsogon ==
=== Governor ===
Incumbent Governor Sally Ante Lee of Lakas–Kampi–CMD retired. Lakas–Kampi–CMD nominated Lee's husband, former governor Raul Lee, who won the election.

Candidate	Party	Votes	%
Raul Lee	Lakas–Kampi–CMD	160,251	59.69
Jose Solis	Kabalikat ng Malayang Pilipino	60,830	22.66
Ramon Gallinera	Aksyon Demokratiko	38,035	14.17
Amadeo Brin	Philippine Green Republican Party	3,350	1.25
Antonio Imperial Jr.	Independent	3,096	1.15
Felizardo Garil	Independent	2,926	1.09
Total		268,488	100.00
Valid votes		268,488	83.07
Invalid/blank votes		54,703	16.93
Total votes		323,191	100.00
Lakas–Kampi–CMD hold			
Source: Commission on Elections

=== Vice Governor ===
Incumbent Vice Governor Renato Laurinaria of the Nacionalista Party ran for mayor of Castilla. Antonio Escudero Jr. won the election as an independent.

Candidate	Party	Votes	%
Antonio Escudero Jr.	Independent	115,946	44.99
Guillermo de Castro	Lakas–Kampi–CMD	88,381	34.29
Rosario Diaz	Kabalikat ng Malayang Pilipino	39,437	15.30
Nida Gamos	Aksyon Demokratiko	11,333	4.40
Mirafe Godisan	Independent	2,630	1.02
Total		257,727	100.00
Valid votes		257,727	79.74
Invalid/blank votes		65,464	20.26
Total votes		323,191	100.00
Independent gain from Nacionalista Party			
Source: Commission on Elections

=== Provincial Board ===
The Sorsogon Provincial Board is composed of 13 board members, 10 of whom are elected.

Party	Votes	%	Seats
Lakas–Kampi–CMD	303,131	34.30	5
Liberal Party	211,619	23.94	4
Kabalikat ng Malayang Pilipino	205,271	23.23	1
Nacionalista Party	27,940	3.16	0
Aksyon Demokratiko	18,139	2.05	0
Kilusang Bagong Lipunan	9,799	1.11	0
PDP–Laban	9,149	1.04	0
Independent	98,768	11.18	0
Total	883,816	100.00	10
Total votes	323,191	–	
Source: Commission on Elections

==== 1st district ====
Candidate	Party	Votes	%
Rebecca Aquino	Liberal Party	62,900	13.76
Mark Eric Dioneda	Liberal Party	53,527	11.71
Fernando David Duran III	Lakas–Kampi–CMD	46,381	10.15
Arnulfo Perete	Liberal Party	43,853	9.60
Franco Eric Ravanilla	Liberal Party	43,177	9.45
Rolando Añonuevo	Lakas–Kampi–CMD	35,820	7.84
Ramil Marianito	Nacionalista Party	27,940	6.11
Owen Amor	Kabalikat ng Malayang Pilipino	25,433	5.57
Ferdinand Laguna	Kabalikat ng Malayang Pilipino	24,308	5.32
Gregorio de Jesus	Independent	19,265	4.22
Joseph Voltaire de Hitta	Kabalikat ng Malayang Pilipino	19,202	4.20
Antonio Merciales	Independent	14,887	3.26
Eddie Lotino	Kilusang Bagong Lipunan	9,799	2.14
Raul Lucila	PDP–Laban	9,149	2.00
Nonito Borromeo Sr.	Kabalikat ng Malayang Pilipino	8,846	1.94
Edgar Abitria	Independent	7,921	1.73
Marife Hitta	Independent	4,552	1.00
Total		456,960	100.00
Total votes		164,073	–
Source: Commission on Elections

==== 2nd district ====
Candidate	Party	Votes	%
Angel Escandor	Lakas–Kampi–CMD	53,797	12.60
Benito Doma	Lakas–Kampi–CMD	47,383	11.10
Vladimir Ramon Frivaldo	Kabalikat ng Malayang Pilipino	44,609	10.45
Francisco Frivaldo	Lakas–Kampi–CMD	44,150	10.34
Renato Guban	Lakas–Kampi–CMD	40,953	9.59
Toby Gonzales	Lakas–Kampi–CMD	34,647	8.12
Gina Camposano	Kabalikat ng Malayang Pilipino	29,646	6.95
Gino Francis So	Independent	23,564	5.52
Mariam Flores	Kabalikat ng Malayang Pilipino	20,096	4.71
Albino Guyala III	Kabalikat ng Malayang Pilipino	19,733	4.62
Juanita Frivaldo	Aksyon Demokratiko	18,139	4.25
Carlos Reyes	Kabalikat ng Malayang Pilipino	13,398	3.14
Joey Gois	Liberal Party	8,162	1.91
Saturnino Lopez	Independent	6,793	1.59
Theopane Laguna	Independent	6,475	1.52
Rolando Barrun	Independent	6,434	1.51
Salvador Fungo	Independent	5,230	1.23
Angelita Genova	Independent	3,647	0.85
Total		426,856	100.00
Total votes		159,118	–
Source: Commission on Elections
