= Camarines Norte Provincial Board =

Legislative body of the province of Camarines Norte, Philippines

Camarines Norte Provincial Board Sangguniang Panlalawigan ng Camarines Norte

Type
- Type: Unicameral
- Term limits: 3 terms (9 years)

Leadership
- Presiding Officer: Joseph V. Ascutia, Liberal Party since June 30, 2022

Structure
- Seats: 14 board members 1 ex officio presiding officer
- Political groups: PFP (8) Nacionalista (1) NPC (1) TBD (1) Nonpartisan (3)
- Length of term: 3 years
- Authority: Local Government Code of the Philippines

Elections
- Voting system: Multiple non-transferable vote (regular members); Indirect election (ex officio members); Acclamation (sectoral member)
- Last election: May 12, 2025
- Next election: May 15, 2028

Meeting place
- Camarines Norte Provincial Capitol, Daet

The Camarines Norte Provincial Board is the Sangguniang Panlalawigan (provincial legislature) of the Philippine province of Camarines Norte.

The members are elected via plurality-at-large voting: the province is divided into four districts, the first and fourth districts sending three members to the provincial board, while the second and third send two members; the number of candidates the electorate votes for and the number of winning candidates depends on the number of members their district sends. The vice governor is the ex officio presiding officer, and only votes to break ties. The vice governor is elected via the plurality voting system province-wide.

Beginning in 2010, the districts used in appropriation of members is coextensive with the legislative districts of Camarines Norte. Prior to 2010 when the province was just one congressional district, the Commission on Elections divided the province into two provincial board districts.

== District apportionment ==
Elections	No. of seats per district		Ex officio seats	Reserved seats	Total seats
Elections	1st	2nd	Ex officio seats	Reserved seats	Total seats
2004–2022	5	5	3	—	13
2022–present	5	5	3	1	14

== List of members ==
An additional three ex officio members are the presidents of the provincial chapters of the Liga ng mga Barangay, Philippine Councilors League, the Sangguniang Kabataan provincial president; the municipal and city (if applicable) presidents of the Liga ng mga Barangay, Councilor's League and Sangguniang Kabataan, shall elect amongst themselves their provincial presidents which shall be their representatives at the board.

=== Current members ===
These are the members after the 2025 local elections and 2023 barangay and SK elections:

- Vice Governor: Joseph V. Ascutia (Liberal)

Seat	Board member	Party	Start of term	End of term
1st district	John Carlo V. De Lima	PFP	June 30, 2022	June 30, 2028
1st district	Winifredo B. Oco	PFP	June 30, 2022	June 30, 2028
1st district	Arthur Michael G. Canlas	PFP	June 30, 2025	June 30, 2028
1st district	Jhonny A. Enova	NPC	June 30, 2025	June 30, 2028
1st district	Teresita D.L. Malubay	PFP	June 30, 2022	June 30, 2028
2nd district	Dennis L. Riel	PFP	June 30, 2025	June 30, 2028
2nd district	Arnulfo M. Balane	PFP	June 30, 2025	June 30, 2028
2nd district	Jonah Pedro G. Pimentel	Nacionalista	June 30, 2025	June 30, 2028
2nd district	Rodolfo D. Gache	PFP	June 30, 2022	June 30, 2028
2nd district	Renee H. Depante	PFP	June 30, 2025	June 30, 2028
ABC	Rebecca Padilla	Nonpartisan	March 24, 2024	January 1, 2026
PCL	TBD			June 30, 2028
SK	Mary Joy Carranza	Nonpartisan	November 24, 2023	January 1, 2026
IPMR	Ricky Noblesala	Nonpartisan	November 16, 2022	November 16, 2025

=== Vice Governor ===
Election year	Name	Party
2001	Alexis Pardo	
2004	Edgardo Tallado	PMP/NPC
2007	Roy Padilla Jr.	NPC
2010	Jonah Pimentel	Lakas
2013	Jonah Pimentel	Liberal
2016	Jonah Pimentel	NPC
2019	— (Note: Concon Panotes, the board member with the most votes in the 2019 elections, was sworn in as acting vice governor after Jonah Pimentel, the candidate who had the most number of votes in the vice gubernatorial election, his candidacy canceled for already serving for three consecutive terms prior to the election.)	
2022	Joseph V. Ascutia	Liberal
2025	Joseph V. Ascutia	Liberal

=== 1st District ===
- Municipalities: Capalonga, Jose Panganiban, Labo, Paracale, Santa Elena
- Population (2020): 312,910

Election year	Member (party)	Member (party)	Member (party)	Member (party)	Member (party)
2004	Ruth Herrera (Lakas)	Nonito Flores (Lakas)	Jose Boma (Lakas)	Samuel King (Lakas)	Ligaya Pedron (KNP)
2007	Ruth Herrera (UNO)	Jonah Pimentel (KAMPI)	Jose Segundo (UNO)	Romeo Marmol (UNO)	Ligaya Pedron (UNO)
2010	Edgar Dasco (Liberal)	Godfrey Parale (Lakas-Kampi)	Jose Boma (Lakas-Kampi)	Erwin Lausin (Lakas-Kampi)	Teresita Malubay (Lakas-Kampi)
2013	Pamela Pardo (Liberal)	Reynoir Quibral (NUP)	Arthur Canlas (NUP)	Erwin Lausin (NUP)	Teresita Malubay (NUP)
2016	Arthur Canlas (Liberal)	Erwin Lausin (Liberal)	Reynoir Quibral (Liberal)	Artemio Serdon Jr. (NPC)	Muriel Pandi (NPC)
2019	Artemio Serdon Jr. (PDP-Laban)	Arthur Canlas (NUP)	Aida Dasco (PDP-Laban)	Reynoir Quibral (PDP-Laban)	Walter Randolph Jalgalado (NUP)
2022	Artemio Serdon Jr. (PDP-Laban)	John Carlo de Lima (Liberal)	Winifredo Oco (NUP)	Teresita Malubay (NUP)	Muriel Pandi (PDP-Laban)
2025	John Carlo V. De Lima (PFP)	Winifredo B. Oco (PFP)	Arthur Michael G. Canlas (PFP)	Jhonny A. Enova (NPC)	Teresita D.L. Malubay (PFP)

=== 2nd District ===
- Municipalities: Basud, Daet, Mercedes, San Lorenzo Ruiz, San Vicente, Talisay, Vinzons
- Population (2020): 316,789

Election year	Member (party)	Member (party)	Member (party)	Member (party)	Member (party)
2004	Arthur Canlas (Lakas)	Edgar Dasco (Lakas)	Joeffrey Pandi (Lakas)	Nestor Manarang (Lakas)	Amado Herico (Lakas)
2007	Arthur Canlas (KAMPI)	Teresita Malubay (UNO)	Joeffrey Pandi (Lakas)	Pamela Pardo (UNO)	Elpidio Tenorio (UNO)
2010	Gerardo Quiñones (Lakas-Kampi)	Ligaya Pedron (Liberal)	Romeo Marmol (Liberal)	Rodolfo Gache (Lakas-Kampi)	Ruth Herrera (Lakas-Kampi)
2013	Gerardo Quiñones (Independent)	Senen Jerez (NUP)	Romeo Marmol (Liberal)	Rodolfo Gache (Liberal)	Renee Herrera (NUP)
2016	Rodolfo Gache (NPC)	Joseph Stanley Alegre (Liberal)	Renee Depante (NPC)	Gerardo Quiñones (NPC)	Godfrey Parale (Liberal)
2019	Joseph Christopher Panotes (PDP-Laban)	Joseph Stanley Alegre (PDP-Laban)	Godfrey Parale (NUP)	Renee Depante (PDP-Laban)	Renato Moreno (PDP-Laban)
2022	Joseph Christopher Panotes (PDP-Laban)	Joseph Stanley Alegre (PDP-Laban)	Rodolfo Gache (PDP-Laban)	Gerardo Quiñones (PDP-Laban)	Renato Moreno (PDP-Laban)
2025	Dennis L. Riel (PFP)	Arnulfo M. Balane (PFP)	Jonah Pedro G. Pimentel (Nacionalista)	Rodolfo D. Gache (PFP)	Renee H. Depante (PFP)
