= Padilla family =

Filipino family

- Filipino political family and acting family
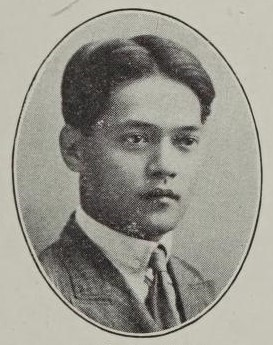
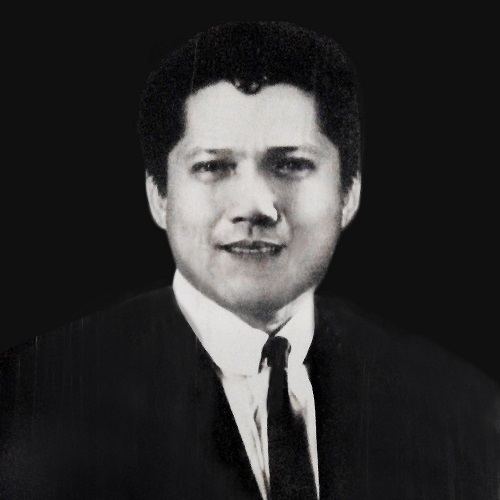
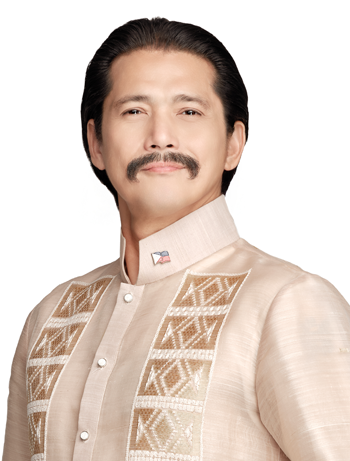
- José Padilla Sr. Roy Padilla Sr. Robin Padilla
- Country: Philippines
- Current region: National Capital Region, Philippines
- Origin: Quingua, Bulacan, Captaincy General of the Philippines
- Members: See table below
- Connected families: Quizon family

The Padilla family is a Filipino family of entertainers, politicians and athletes.

== List of members ==
1. José Padilla Sr.
  1. ∞ married Clarita Ruiz
    1. Carlos Padilla Sr.
      1. ∞ married Melania Dolorico
        1. Carlos Padilla Jr.
          1. ∞ married Esperanza Perez
              1. Zsa Zsa Padilla
                1. ∞ married Modesto Tatlonghari
                  1. Karylle
                    1. ∞ married Yael Yuzon
                2. with Dolphy, had two children: Zia and Nicole.
                  1. Zia Denise Marie Quizon
        2. Melanie Padilla
          1. ∞ married Virgilio Javate
              1. Gino Padilla
                1. ∞ married Concepcion Canno, they have two children.
                  1. Josh Padilla
    2. José Carmelo Padilla Jr.
      1. ∞ married Arsenia Francisco, they had six children
        1. Zenaida Padilla
        2. Jovy Padilla
        3. Maria Edith Padilla
        4. José "Pempe Jr." Padilla III
        5. Og Padilla
        6. Joena Padilla
    3. María Clara Ruiz Padilla
      1. ∞ married Pedro R. Santos
        1. Tessie Santos
    4. Maria Paz Padilla
      1. ∞ married Gregorio Fernandez
        1. Merle Fernandez
        2. Rodolfo Valentino "Rudy" Fernandez
          1. ∞ married Lorna Tolentino
            1. Renz Marion Fernandez
              1. ∞ married Jef Gaitan
            2. Ralph Fernandez
          2. with Alma Moreno had
            1. Mark Anthony Fernandez
              1. ∞ married Melissa Garcia, they have one child.
                1. Grae Fernandez
    5. Pilar Padilla
      1. ∞ married Brooks
    6. Mariano "Naning" Padilla
    7. Violeta "Cristina Aragon" Padilla
  2. with Ramona Bustamante had
    1. Casimero "Roy" Padilla Sr.
      1. ∞ married Loreta Aquino
        1. Roberto Padilla
        2. Casimero "Roy" Padilla Jr.
      2. ∞ married Eva Cariño
        1. Rowena Padilla Evangelista
          1. ∞ married Thaddeus Evangelista
            1. Ted Matthew Padilla Evangelista
        2. Randolf Padilla
        3. Rema Padilla-Ohno
          1. ∞ married Teruhiro Ohno
            1. Mika Padilla Ohno
        4. Roy "Royette" Padilla
          1. ∞ married Jane Cheryl Dayrit
            1. Aldrin Padilla
            2. Kevin Padilla
            3. Isabela Padilla
            4. Bettina Padilla
            5. Roy Padilla III
        5. Roda Padilla Ariki
          1. ∞ married Masayuki Ariki Sr.
            1. Masayuki Padilla Ariki Jr.
              1. had two children
                1. Masayuki "Thirdy" Padilla Ariki III
                2. Yumi Padilla Ariki
        6. Rommel Padilla
          1. ∞ married Annabelle Antonio (annulled)
            1. Matt Padilla
            2. Ronnel Jake "RJ" Padilla
              1. ∞ married Rosalie Abdelsayed
                1. Raniaah Amira Padilla
                2. Royce Aaliyah Padilla
            3. Roanna Marie Padilla
          2. with Karla Estrada had
            1. Daniel Padilla
          3. with Edna Mendoza had
            1. Romina Red Padilla
          4. ∞ married Charisse Hibek
            1. Aryana Padilla
            2. Arize Jose Padilla
        7. BB Gandanghari (formerly Rustom)
          1. ∞ married Carmina Villarroel (annulled)
        8. Robinhood "Robin" Padilla
          1. with Lea Orosa had
            1. Camille Orosa Garcia
            2. ∞ married Anthony Nava
          2. ∞ married Liezl Sicangco
            1. Queenie Padilla
            2. Kylie Nicole Padilla
              1. ∞ married Aljur Abrenica (annulled)
                1. Alas Joaquin Abrenica
                2. Axl Romeo Abrenica
            3. Zherileen Padilla
            4. Ahmad Ali Padilla
          3. ∞ married Mariel Rodriguez
            1. Maria Isabella Padilla
            2. Maria Gabriela Padilla
        9. Richelda Padilla-Abella
          1. ∞ married Rico Abella
        10. Romulus Padilla (died at four days old)
      3. with Carmelita Robledo had
        1. Restituto "Resty" Padilla
        2. Ronaldo Padilla
        3. Ricarte Padilla
          1. ∞ married Shenet Silva
            1. Anika Padilla
        4. Rebecca Padilla
          1. with Joey "Pepe" Smith had
            1. Sanya Astra Padilla Smith
          2. ∞ married Dolonius (ended)
            1. Annicka Dolonius
            2. Ingrid Maria Dolonius Perrine
            3. Roy Evert Andrej Dolonius
      4. with Base had
        1. Casimero "Kuatro" Padilla.
          1. ∞ married Marie Grace Macapagal
      5. with Jenny Serafica had
        1. Rodolfo "Gino" Padilla
      6. had 32 more children
        1. Rubi Padilla
          1. had one child
            1. Jeroy Agustin Padilla
              1. ∞ married Kathlyn Joy Salalima
  3. with Salud Pangilinan had
    1. Amado Cortez (born Arsenio Padilla)
      1. ∞ married Gloria Sevilla
        1. Czareanah Padilla
