= Badge of Honor: To Serve and Protect =

2018 Filipino action film

- Directed by: Neal Tan
- Starring: Rommel Padilla; Jeric Raval; Empress Schuck; Rayver Cruz; Alfred Vargas
- Cinematography: Gilbert Obispo
- Edited by: Gilbert Obispo
- Music by: Jake Abella
- Production companies: Pinoyflix Films and Active Media Events Production Co.
- Distributed by: Pinoyflix Films
- Release dates: May 31, 2018 (Camp Crame); July 2, 2018 (San Fernando, La Union); August 14, 2023 (SM Megamall); August 16, 2023
- Running time: 88 minutes
- Country: Philippines
- Languages: English; Filipino

Badge of Honor: To Serve and Protect (initially released as Men in Uniform) is a 2018 Filipino action film directed by Neal Tan. Based on the lives of five separate police officers stationed throughout the Philippines, the film stars Rommel Padilla, Jeric Raval, Empress Schuck, Rayver Cruz and Congressman Alfred Vargas. It was produced by Pinoyflix Films and Active Media Events Production Co. to be an "advocacy film" that portrays the police in a positive light, with its premiere held on May 31, 2018, in Camp Crame. Due to the COVID-19 pandemic, the film's nationwide release was delayed until August 16, 2023.

== Cast ==
- Rommel Padilla as PCol. David Aragon
- Jeric Raval as PCMS Conrado Baldemor
- Empress Schuck as PCpt. Melinda Mallari
- Rayver Cruz as PCpl. Jumeil Javier
- Alfred Vargas as PMaj. Rolando Ramos
- Rosanna Roces

== Release ==
The film first premiered as Men in Uniform on May 31, 2018, at the Multipurpose Hall of Camp Crame in Quezon City, with a second premiere held on July 2, 2018, at the Francisco "Pacoy" Ortega Gym in San Fernando, La Union.

Due to the COVID-19 pandemic, the film's nationwide distribution was delayed for five years. The film was eventually given a third premiere (with the new title of Badge of Honor: To Serve and Protect) at Cinema 2 of SM Megamall in Mandaluyong City on August 14, 2023, with a nationwide theatrical release on August 16. Philippine National Police Chief Benjamin Acorda, who assisted the filmmakers during production, gave Badge of Honor his endorsement.
