= Kahit Demonyo Itutumba Ko =

Kahit Demonyo Itutumba Ko!
- Directed by: Tony San Agustin
- Written by: Rodolfo Fuentes
- Produced by: Zaldy M. Munda
- Starring: Rommel Padilla
- Cinematography: Alfonso Alvarez
- Edited by: Boy Ramos
- Production company: ZMM Productions
- Release date: 2000
- Country: Philippines
- Language: Filipino

Kahit Demonyo Itutumba Ko is a 2000 Filipino action film starring Rommel Padilla, Jean Garcia and Vic Diaz.

== Plot ==
A soldier (Rommel Padilla) is among a unit who attacked and destroyed a rebel base, capturing a rebel returnee (Jean Garcia), which he fell in love. He later quits his job and settles in with the rebel returnee.

A Chinese man (Vic Diaz) and his mercenaries runs a drug syndicate, which clashes with his belief. He later fights the syndicate.

== Cast ==
- Rommel Padilla
- Jean Garcia
- Paquito Diaz
- Romy Diaz as Chinese man
- Bob Soler
- Vic Diaz
