= José Padilla Sr. =

Filipino politician and actor

The Honorable José Padilla y Gálvez

12th and 14th Governor of Bulacan
- In office 1934–1937
- Preceded by: Cirilo B. Santos
- Succeeded by: Jacinto Molina
- In office 1928–1931
- Preceded by: Restituto J. Castro
- Succeeded by: Cirilo B. Santos

Member of the House of Representatives from Bulacan's 1st district
- In office June 3, 1919 – June 5, 1928
- Preceded by: Mariano Escueta
- Succeeded by: Angelo Suntay

Personal details
- Born: José Padilla y Gálvez; October 30, 1888 Quingua, Bulacan, Captaincy General of the Philippines
- Died: August 13, 1945 (aged 56) Ermita, Manila, Philippine Commonwealth
- Resting place: Campo Santo, Plaridel, Bulacan, Philippines
- Party: Democrata
- Other political affiliations: Popular Front (1941)
- Spouses: Ramona Bustamante; Felipa Pangilinan; Salud Pangilinan; Francisca Cruz; Elvira Castillo; Josefa Galvez Villacorta
- Relations: Padilla family
- Children: 12, including Jose Jr., Carlos, Consuelo, Arsenio, and Roy
- Parents: Monica Gálvez; Pedro Padilla Ortíz
- Nickname(s): Pepe, Mario de Córdova

José Padilla y Gálvez (October 30, 1888 – August 13, 1945) also known by his screen name, Mario de Córdova, was a Filipino lawyer, politician and movie actor.

== Early life ==
José Padilla y Gálvez was born to parents Pedro Padilla Ortiz and Mónica Gálvez y Mariano on October 30, 1888, in Quingua (now Plaridel), Bulacan. He was a descendant of the Spanish Don Luis Ortiz de Padilla (1580–1640).

== Political career ==
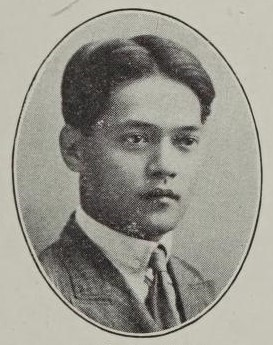
Padilla as member of the House of Representatives, c. 1921

He served as a member of the House of Representatives representing the 1st district of Bulacan from 1919 to 1928 in the 5th, 6th and 7th Philippine Legislatures. Afterwards, he then became the Governor of Bulacan from 1928 to 1931, and again from 1934 to 1937. He ran as senator in the 1941 Philippine Senate election under the Popular Front of Senator Juan Sumulong, but lost.

== Personal life ==
Padilla's progeny made themselves notable in their respective fields of show business, politics and sports. Among his dozen children include actors Jose "Pempe" Padilla Jr., Carlos Padilla Sr., actresses Cristina Aragon, Pilar Padilla, Maria Clara Ruiz Padilla, film director Consuelo Padilla Osorio, diplomat and actor Amado Cortez, and Casimero "Roy" Padilla Sr., former provincial governor of Camarines Norte. He is a grandfather to actor-senator Robin Padilla, BB Gandanghari, Carlos Padilla Jr., Rommel Padilla, Rudy Fernandez, and a great-grandfather of Kylie Padilla and Daniel Padilla.

== Filmography ==
- Secreto de confesión (as Mario de Cordova)
