= Roy Padilla Sr. =

Filipino politician (1926–1988)

The Honorable Casimero Padilla Sr.
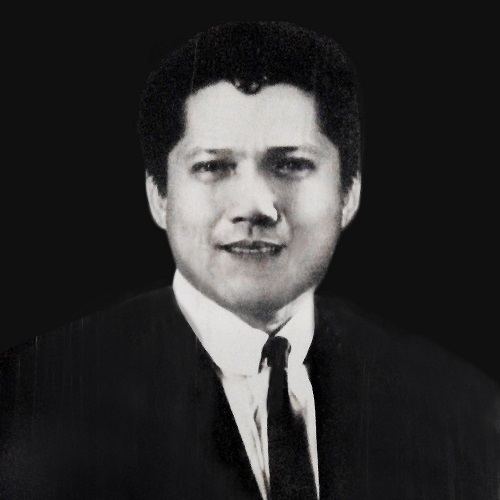

Member of the Regular Batasang Pambansa
- In office June 30, 1984 – March 25, 1986
- Constituency: Camarines Norte

Governor of Camarines Norte
- In office March 16, 1986 – January 17, 1988
- Preceded by: Fernando Pajarillo
- Succeeded by: Roy Padilla Jr.

Personal details
- Born: Casimero Bustamante Padilla; March 4, 1926
- Died: January 17, 1988 (aged 61) Labo, Camarines Norte, Philippines
- Cause of death: Assassination
- Resting place: Jose Panganiban, Camarines Norte, Philippines
- Party: UNIDO
- Spouses: Loreta Aquino; Eva Cariño; Eugenia Renolayan
- Domestic partner: Carmelita Robledo
- Children: 48, including Rommel, Ricarte, Rustom, and Robin
- Parent: José Padilla Sr. (father)
- Relatives: Padilla family
- Occupation: Politician, actor, director
- Nickname: Roy

Casimero "Roy" Bustamante Padilla Sr. (Tagalog pronunciation: [paˈdilja]; March 4, 1926 – January 17, 1988) was a Filipino politician and actor who served as governor of the province of Camarines Norte from 1986 until his assassination in 1988 as a member of Corazon Aquino's UNIDO ticket. He was succeeded by his son, Roy Padilla Jr. He briefly went on to use the name "Carlos Roy Padilla" on his earlier brief stint as an actor and director.

== Early life ==
Casimero Bustamante Padilla was born at the Mary Chiles hospital in Plaridel, Bulacan, on March 4, 1926. His parents were Bulacan governor Jose Padilla Sr. and Ramona Bustamante. Among his half-siblings were Consuelo Padilla Osorio, Carlos Padilla Sr., Jose Padilla Jr., Maria Clara Ruiz and Amado Cortez.

Padilla attended P. Gomez Elementary School, Arellano High School and Manila Law College.

== Career ==
Padilla was a four-time mayor of the bayside town Jose Panganiban, SSS Commissioner, Vice Governor of Camarines Norte, Representative to Batasang Pambansa and Governor of Camarines Norte.

He was an organizer and National President of National Mines and Allied Workers Union, an epitome in labor unionism in the country with tens of thousands of members, mostly in mining industry, nationwide, at its peak.

He was president after his tenure as vice-president of Miners' International Federation based in England.

He was a delegate of Philippines to International Labour Organization of the United Nations in Geneva, Switzerland, representing Labor.

== Personal life ==
Padilla married Loreta O. Aquino in 1946 and had three children. Padilla later married actress Eva Cariño and Eugenia Renolayan.

According to The Philippine Star, Padilla had children with numerous women that numbered up to 48, including Ronaldo in 1962, Royette in 1962, Rommel in 1965, BB Gandanghari (formerly Rustom) in 1967, Rebecca in 1968, Robin in 1969, and Rodolfo ("Gino") in 1974/1975. He was also the father of politicians Casimiro "Roy" Aquino Padilla Jr. (born 1948), a former governor, congressman and vice governor of Camarines Norte, Ricarte "Dong" Robledo Padilla (born 1965), former mayor of Jose Panganiban and current governor of Camarines Norte, and Casimero "Kuatro" Base Padilla (born 1966), current vice mayor of Jose Panganiban.

On January 30, 1988, 13 days after Padilla's assassination, his son Ronaldo died from a car crash at 25 years old after winning the mayoral election in Jose Panganiban.

== Assassination ==
Padilla was assassinated in Labo, Camarines Norte by a gunman while campaigning for governor on January 17, 1988, a day before the national elections, with his son Roy Jr. running in his stead. He was 61, and was buried in Camarines Norte.

== Legacy ==
A park was named after him in the town of Jose Panganiban, Camarines Norte.
