= Amado Cortez =

Filipino actor

- Born: Arsenio Ruiz Padilla; December 14, 1927; Daet, Camarines, Philippines
- Died: March 22, 2003 (aged 75); Manila, Philippines
- Occupation: Actor
- Years active: 1950–1998
- Spouse: Gloria Sevilla

Amado Cortez (born Arsenio Ruiz Padilla, December 14, 1927 – March 22, 2003) was a Filipino actor and diplomat. His father was Jose Padilla Sr., a governor in Plaridel, Bulacan and his mother was Maria Clara Ruiz. His brothers were Jose Padilla Jr., Carlos Padilla Sr., Roy Padilla and his sisters were Consuelo Padilla-Osorio, Paz Padilla, Pilar Padilla and Cristina Aragon who portrayed Valentina in the first Darna movie in 1951.

His first contract was under LVN Pictures. He made five movies with LVN, namely Ang Tapis mo Inday with Celia Flor, Anak ng Pulubi and Nasaan ka Giliw both with Tessie Quintana, Harana sa Karagatan with Mila del Sol and Tia Loleng with Armando Goyena.

After two years of making movies with LVN Studios, he signed another contract with the Santiagos and became the mainstay movie player on that studio.

He then made several pictures with Premiere Production. He married Gloria Sevilla, another Premiere Production siren.

Cortez won a Filipino Academy of Movie Arts and Sciences Award for Best Supporting Actor in 1970. His last film was "Campus Scandal" (1998).

In 1998, Philippine President Joseph Estrada, a former actor and colleague of Cortez, named Cortez as Consul General of the Philippines in San Francisco. He retired in 2001 and died in 2003. Cortez was awarded a posthumous lifetime achievement award in 2003 by the Filipino Academy of Movie Arts and Sciences. Cortez and spouse Gloria Sevilla are buried at Loyola Memorial Park.

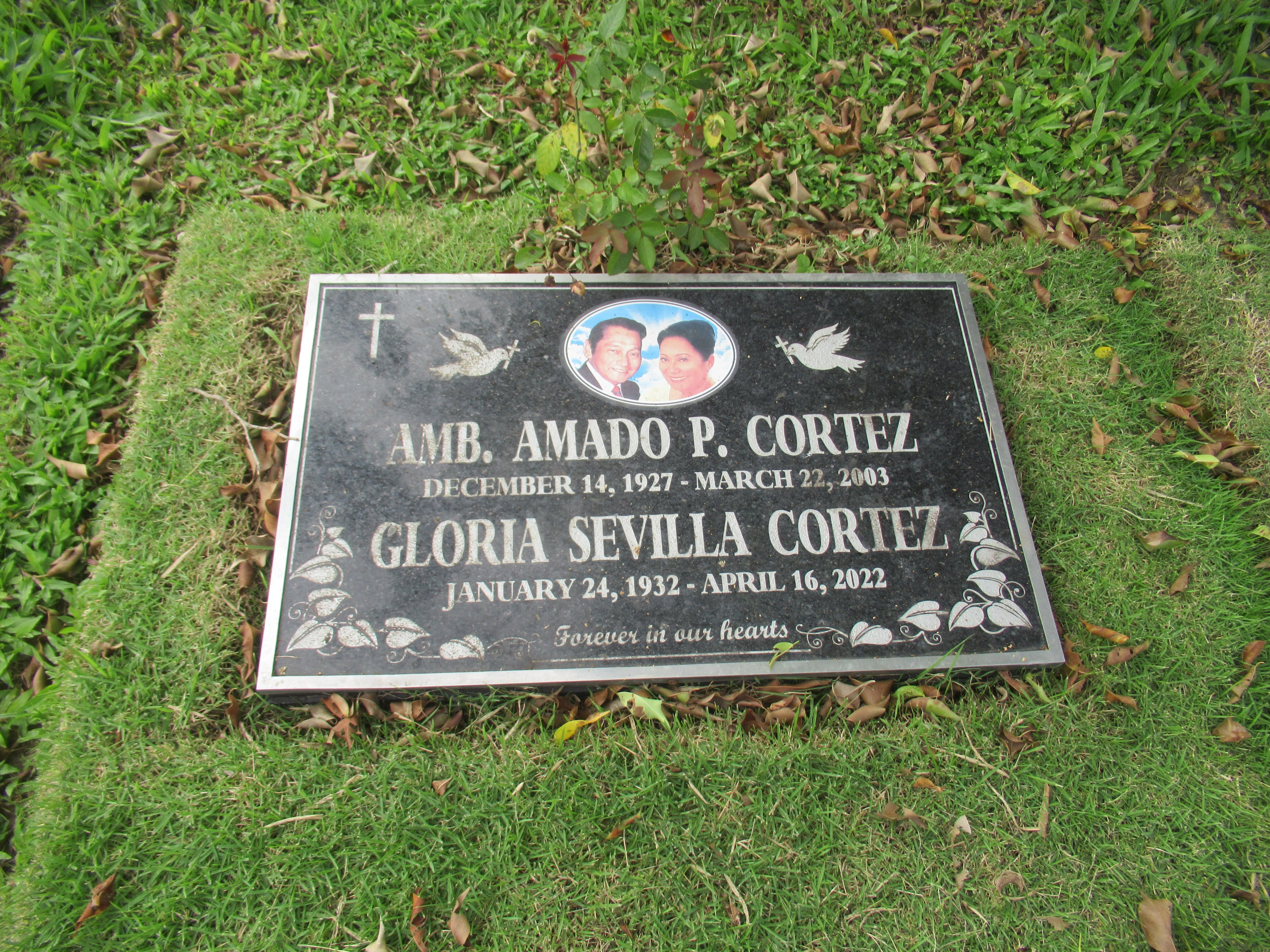
Cortez-Gloria Sevilla grave

== Filmography (partial) ==
- 1951 - Ang Tapis mo Inday
- 1951 - Anak ng Pulubi
- 1951 - Nasaan ka, Giliw
- 1952 - Harana sa Karagatan
- 1952 - Tia Loleng
- 1953 - Carlos Trece
- 1953 - Kapitan Berong
- 1953 - Habang Buhay
- 1954 - Sa Kabila ng Bukas
- 1954 - Ginto sa Lusak
- 1955 - Baril O Araro
- 1955 - Bandilang Pula
- 1956 - El conde de Monte Carlo
- 1956 - Prinsipe Villarba
- 1956 - Walang Panginoon
- 1956 - Taong Putik
- 1956 - Ang Sibat
- 1957 - Viva Las Senoritas
- 1957 - Wala nang Iluha
- 1957 - Ang Bahay sa Bundok
- 1957 - Bicol Express
- 1957 - Yaya Maria
- 1957 - Kalibre .45
- 1957 - Familia Alvarado
- 1958 - Man on the Run
- 1958 - Ang Nobya kong Igorota
- 1958 - 4 na Pulubi
