= Governor of Camarines Norte =

Local chief executive

- Punonglalawigan ng Lalawigan ng Camarines Norte
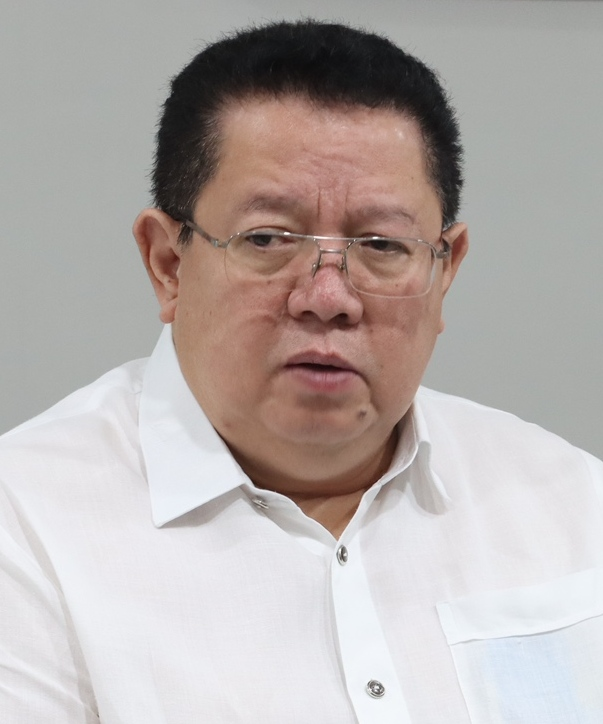
- Incumbent; Ricarte Padilla since June 30, 2022
- Style: The Honorable
- Seat: Camarines Norte Provincial Capitol, Daet
- Term length: 3 years, renewable maximum not eligible for re-election immediately after three consecutive terms
- Inaugural holder: Miguel Martinez Lukban
- Formation: March 3, 1919
- Deputy: Vice Governor

The governor of Camarines Norte is the local chief executive and head of the Provincial Government of Camarines Norte in the Philippines. Along with the governors of Albay, Camarines Sur, Catanduanes, Masbate, and Sorsogon, the province's chief executive is a member of the Regional Development Council of the Bicol Region.

== List of governors of Camarines Norte ==
Governors of Camarines Norte

4. PHILIPPINE LEGISLATURE (1919-1937)
No.	Image	Name	Term	Origin	Note(s)
1		Miguel Martinez Lukban	March 3, 1919 - June 6, 1922	Daet	appointed governor when Ambos Camarines split into Norte and Sur.
2		Gabriel Tejaro Hernandez	June 6, 1922 -June 30, 1925	Daet	On his first term.
(1)		Miguel Martinez Lukban	June 30, 1925- June 30, 1928	Daet	On his second term.
3		Carlos Racelis Balce	June 30, 1925- June 30, 1931	Indan (Vinzons)	
(2)		Gabriel Tejaro Hernandez	June 30, 1931- June 30, 1934	Daet	On his second term
(1)		Miguel Martinez Lukban	June 30, 1934 - December 30, 1937	Daet	On his third term.

5. COMMONWEALTH PERIOD (1937-1946)
No.	Image	Name	Term	Origin	Note(s)
(1)		Miguel Martinez Lukban	December 30, 1937 - December 30, 1940	Daet	On his fourth term.
4		Wenceslao Quinito; Vinzons Sr.	December 30, 1940 - December 30, 1941	Indan (Vinzons)	Elected assemblyman in 1941. Father of Student Activism in the Philippines. Filipino Patriot, executed by Japanese invaders on July 15, 1942.
5		Basilio Borja Bautista y Villegas	December 30, 1941 - May 4, 1942	Labo	Former senior board member, succeeded Vinzons when the latter elected as assemblyman.
6		Carlos Ascutia	May 5, 1942 - May 28, 1946	Indan (Vinzons)	Appointed by Japanese puppet government.

6. THIRD PHILIPPINE REPUBLIC (1946-1978)
No.	Image	Name	Term	Origin	Note(s)
7		Fernando Argente Suzara	May 28, 1946 - December 30, 1947	Daet	
8		Regino Zenarosa Guinto	December 30, 1947 - 1948	Vinzons	Elected for second term.
9		Wilfredo Pabico Panotes	1948 – December 30, 1955	Daet	
10		Esmeraldo Tagala Eco	December 30, 1955 - 1958	Paracale	
11		Cayetano Quinito Vinzons	1958 - December 30, 1959	Vinzons	Acting governor
12		Dominador Sorongclo Asis	December 30, 1959 - December 30, 1963	Vinzons	
13		Wenceslao Gonzales Vinzons Jr.	December 30, 1963 - December 30, 1967	Vinzons	
14		Nicolas Pardo	December 30, 1967 - December 30, 1971	Labo	
15		Marcial Reyes Pimentel	December 30, 1971 - June 12, 1978	Vinzons	Later elected representative at Interim Batasang Pambansa.

7. FOURTH PHILIPPINE REPUBLIC (1978-1986)
No.	Image	Name	Term	Origin	Note(s)
16		Fernando Vinzons Pajarillo	June 12, 1978 - March 15, 1986	Vinzons	

8. FIFTH PHILIPPINE REPUBLIC (1986–present)
No.	Image	Name	Term	Origin	Note(s)
17		Casimero Roy Bustamante Padilla Sr.	March 16, 1986 - January 17, 1988	Jose Panganiban	Appointed by Pres. Corazon C. Aquino. Died in office.
18		Casimero Roy Aquino Padilla Jr.	January 17, 1988 - January 31, 1988	Jose Panganiban	Succeeded his father.
18		Casimero Roy Aquino Padilla Jr.	February 1, 1988 - June 30, 1998	Jose Panganiban	Elected in 3 consecutive terms
19		Jesus Emmanuel Basa Pimentel	June 30, 1998 - June 30, 2001	Vinzons	
20		Jesus O. Typoco Jr.	June 30, 2001 - June 30, 2007	Vinzons	Elected twice
20		Jesus O. Typoco Jr.	June 30, 2007 - February 24, 2010	Vinzons	Elected on his third consecutive term but later found out loss during the May 2007 elections after recount.
21		Edgardo Angeles Tallado	February 25, 2010 - June 30, 2010	Labo	Proclaimed governor after vote recount
21		Edgardo Angeles Tallado	June 30, 2010 - June 30, 2013	Labo	Elected
21		Edgardo Angeles Tallado	June 30, 2013 - October 1, 2015	Labo	Reelected but later suspended by the Ombudsman.
22		Jonah Pedro Guinto Pimentel	October 1, 2015 - June 30, 2016	Vinzons	Incumbent vice-governor. Acting governor in lieu of Tallado.
(21)		Edgardo Angeles Tallado	June 30, 2016 - November 8, 2016	Labo	Elected but suspended for the second time.
(22)		Jonah Pedro Guinto Pimentel	November 8, 2016 - December 12, 2016	Vinzons	
(21)		Edgardo Angeles Tallado	December 12, 2016 - March 15, 2018	Labo	Elected but suspended for the third time.
(22)		Jonah Pedro Guinto Pimentel	March 15, 2018 - October 29, 2018	Vinzons	
(21)		Edgardo Angeles Tallado	October 30, 2018 - June 30, 2019	Labo	Returned after completion of suspension.
(21)		Edgardo Angeles Tallado	June 30, 2019 - June 30, 2022	Labo	Reelected.
23		Ricarte Robledo Padilla	June 30, 2022 – present	Jose Panganiban	Incumbent.
