= Edgar Tallado =

Filipino politician

The Honorable Edgardo Tallado
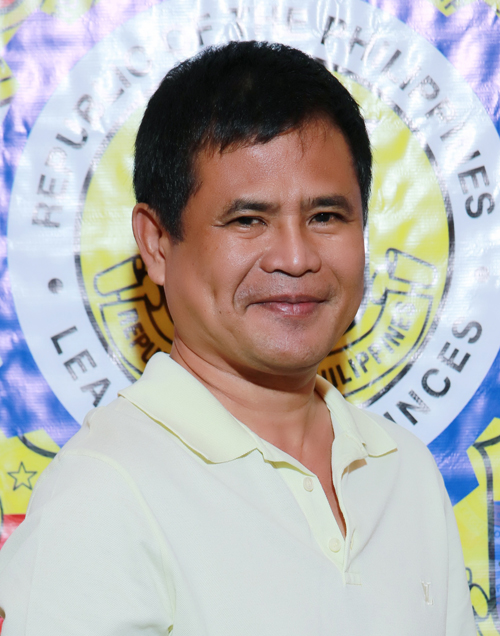

Governor of Camarines Norte
- In office February 25, 2010 – June 30, 2022 (Note: Suspended in three occasions: October 1, 2015 – June 30, 2016 November 8 – December 12, 2016 March 15 – October 29, 2018)
- Preceded by: Jesus Typoco Jr.
- Succeeded by: Ricarte Padilla

Personal details
- Born: Edgardo Angeles Tallado; July 9, 1963 (age 62) Labo, Camarines Norte, Philippines
- Party: NPC (2007–2010, 2015–2019; 2024–present)
- Other party: PDP–Laban (2019–2024); Liberal (2010–2015); UNO (2007)
- Spouse: Josefina Tallado
- Children: 1

Edgardo "Egay" Tallado (born July 9, 1963) is a Filipino politician from the province of Camarines Norte in the Philippines. He previously served as a Governor of Camarines Norte from 2010 to 2022.

He ran for governor in 2007 and lost, but the result was overturned in his favor in 2010 via an election recount. He was elected as governor in May of that same year and was re-elected in 2013 as his second term, third term in 2016 and last term in 2019.

== Career ==
On June 15, 2015, Liberal Party removed Tallado after he was found “guilty of committing grossly immoral conduct.”

In October 2015, Tallado was dismissed by the Ombudsman of the Philippines.

== Notes ==
Political offices
Preceded by Jesus Typoco Jr.	Governor of Camarines Norte; 2010–2022	Succeeded by Ricarte Padilla
