= Ricarte Padilla =

Governor of Camarines Norte

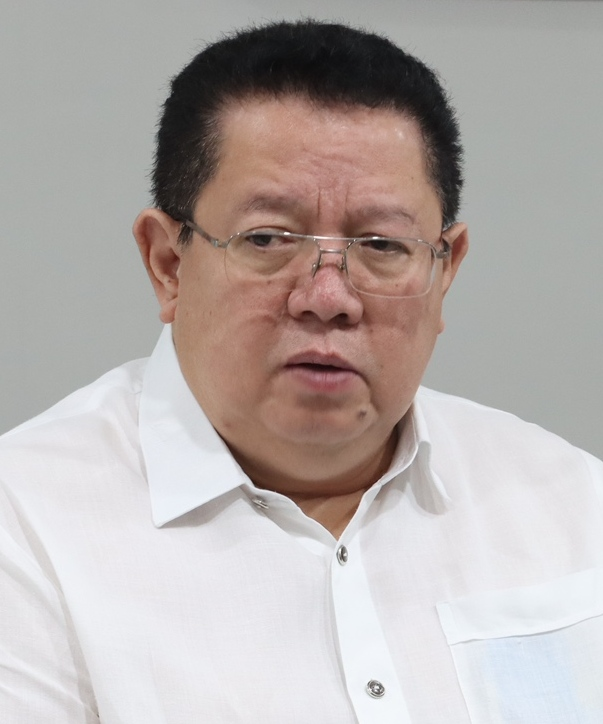
- Padilla in 2023

Governor of Camarines Norte
- Incumbent
- Assumed office June 30, 2022
- Vice Governor: Joseph V. Ascutia
- Preceded by: Edgar Tallado

Mayor of Jose Panganiban
- In office June 30, 2010 – June 30, 2019
- Preceded by: William Lim
- Succeeded by: Aye Non

Personal details
- Born: Ricarte Robledo Padilla; June 1, 1965 (age 61) Jose Panganiban, Camarines Norte, Philippines
- Party: PFP (2024–present)
- Other political affiliations: Aksyon (2021–2024); NUP (2018–2021); Liberal (2015–2018); PMP (2009–2015)
- Relations: Robin Padilla (half-brother); Rommel Padilla (half-brother); BB Gandanghari (half-brother)
- Parent(s): Roy Padilla Sr. Carmelita Robledo
- Occupation: Politician

Ricarte "Dong" Robledo Padilla (born June 1, 1965) is a Filipino politician who currently serves as the Governor of Camarines Norte. He is the half-brother of Senator Robin Padilla and actors Rommel Padilla and BB Gandanghari.

== Early life ==
Ricarte Padilla was born in Jose Panganiban, Camarines Norte to Roy Padilla Sr., a former Governor of Camarines Norte who was assassinated in 1988, and Carmelita Robledo. He has 47 siblings, including older brothers Restituto ("Resty", died 2002) and Ronaldo (died 1988), younger sister Rebecca, and half-siblings Robin Padilla, Rommel Padilla, Royette Padilla, BB Gandanghari (formerly Rustom Padilla) and Casimero "Kuatro" Padilla. His grandfather was also a former Governor of Bulacan.

== Career ==
Padilla was the former mayor of Jose Panganiban, Camarines Norte before running for Vice Governor but losing with 117,952 votes. He filed an unsuccessful appeal to the Supreme Court against the result.

In 2022, Padilla was elected as Governor of Camarines Norte with 162,081 votes. Padilla ousted the reelectionist incumbent Edgardo Tallado.

On June 30, 2025, Padilla was suspended for 18 months by the Office of the Ombudsman for allegedly appointing two individuals to government posts without authorization.
