= José Padilla Jr. =

Filipino boxer and film actor (1911–1979)

- Born: José Carmelo Ruiz Padilla Jr. July 16, 1911; Plaridel, Bulacan, Philippine Islands
- Died: June 18, 1979 (aged 67); Manila, Philippines
- Occupation: Actor
- Father: José Padilla Sr.
- Relatives: Padilla family

José Carmelo "Pempe" Ruiz Padilla Jr. (Tagalog pronunciation: [paˈdilja]; July 16, 1911 – June 18, 1979) was a Filipino actor who appeared in several dozen movies. He made his first movie in 1931.

Padilla also represented his country as a lightweight boxer during the 1932 Summer Olympics in Los Angeles, United States, in 1932 and the 1936 Summer Olympics in Berlin, Germany, in 1936. In 1932, he was eliminated in the first round of the lightweight class after losing his bout to eventual gold medalist Lawrence Stevens from South Africa.

== Family ==
Padilla was born into a show business clan. His father José Padilla Sr. was the governor of Bulacan from 1928 to 1931, and his brother was Carlos Padilla and Roy Padilla. He was the uncle of Rudy Fernández and Robin Padilla. He married Arsenia Francisco, a famous actress, and they had six children: Zenaida, Jovy, Maria Edith, Pempe Jr. (José III), Og, and Joena. He was the great-uncle of Zsa Zsa Padilla.

== Movie career ==
He made his first movie in 1931, a silent horror film called Ang Multo sa Libingan, also known as Ghost in the Cemetery. His second movie, Doctor Kuba (1933), was also successful in the Philippines; in it he played second only to the leading actor Don Dannon. Padilla had already made approximately three dozen movies before the Japanese occupied Manila in 1942. He was paired with several screen sirens: for example in Ako'y Maghihintay (1938) he teamed up with his real-life wife Arsenia Francisco, in Arimunding-Munding (1939) with Carmen Rosales, in Bakya Mo Neneng (1947) with Rosa del Rosario, and in Kaaway ng Babae (1948) with Lilia Dizon.

== Filmography ==
- 1931 – Ang Multo sa Libingan
- 1933 – Doctor Kuba
- 1934 – Mag-inang Mahirap
- 1934 – X3X
- 1934 – Liwayway ng Kalayaan
- 1935 - Ang Gulong ng Buhay
- 1935 - Kuwintas ng Himutok
- 1937 - Mga Pusong Dakila
- 1937 - Asahar at Kabaong
- 1937 - Huling Awit
- 1937 - Ilaw ng Langit
- 1937 - Bilanggo Habang Buhay
- 1938 - Ang Batang Tulisan
- 1938 - Kamay na Bakal
- 1938 - El Secreto dela Confesion
- 1938 - Celia at Balagtas
- 1938 - Ako'y Maghihintay
- 1938 - Lihim na Pagsinta
- 1939 - Azucena
- 1939 - Naglahong Dambana
- 1940 - Lihim ng Kapatid
- 1940 - Sa Dating Pugad
- 1940 - Ave Maria
- 1940 - Magpakailan Man
- 1940 - Dating Sumpaan
- 1941 - Carmen
- 1941 - Princesita
- 1941 - Panibugho
- 1941 - Pagsuyo
- 1941 - Palikero
- 1941 - Lolita
- 1942 - Landas na Ginto
- 1946 - OO Ako'y Espiya
- 1946 - Probinsiyana
- 1946 - Ulilang Watawat
- 1947 - Ngayon at Kailanman
- 1947 - Bakya mo Neneng
- 1947 - Bagong Sinderella
- 1947 - Maling Akala
- 1947 - Miss Philippines
- 1947 - Caprichosa
- 1947 - Violeta
- 1947 - Binatang Taring
- 1947 - Romansa
- 1948 - Kaaway ng Babae
- 1948 - Perfidia
- 1948 - Pista sa Nayon
- 1948 - Maliit lamang ang Daigdig
- 1948 - Labi ng Bataan
- 1948 - Hiram na Pangalan
- 1949 - Lihim na Bayani
- 1949 - Ibigin mo Ako, Lalaking Matapang
- 1949 - Anak ng Panday
- 1949 - Halik sa Bandila
- 1949 - Makabagong Pilipina
- 1949 - Sipag ay Yaman
- 1949 - Ronquillo
- 1949 - Hen. Gregorio del Pilar
- 1949 - Magdalena
- 1950 - Mutya ng Pasig
- 1950 - Tatlong Balaraw
- 1950 - Ang Bombero
- 1950 - Gulong ng Palad
- 1950 - Punglo at Pag-ibig
- 1951 - Sa Oras ng Kasal
- 1951 - Bahay na Tisa
- 1951 - Dahong Palay
- 1951 - Walang Kapantay
- 1951 - Diego Silang
- 1951 - Ang Aking Kahapon
- 1952 - Matador
- 1952 - Ngipin sa Ngipin
- 1952 - Sawa sa Lumang Simboryo
- 1953 - Maria Mercedes
- 1953 - Rosa Villa
- 1953 - Tianak Cinema Technician Inc.
- 1953 - Itinakwil
- 1953 - Kambal na Lihim
- 1953 - Sa Hirap at Ginhawa
- 1953 - Siga-Siga
- 1953 - Huk sa Bagong Pamumuhay
- 1953 - May Karapatang Isilang
- 1953 - Habang Buhay
- 1954 - Ri-Gi-Ding
- 1954 - Sa Kabila ng Bukas
- 1954 - Matandang Dalaga
- 1954 - Basagulera
- 1954 - Sex Gang
- 1954 - Batalyon Pilipino sa Korea
- 1954 - Ginto sa Lusak - Balatbat-Flores Productions
- 1954 - Limang Misteryo - Continental Pictures
- 1955 - Palahamak
- 1955 - Minera
- 1955 - Baril O Araro? - Filipiniana Pictures
- 1955 - Sapagka't Mahal Kita - Fremel Production
- 1955 - Ha Cha Cha
- 1955 - Pangako ng Puso
- 1955 - Paltik
- 1955 - Sanda Wong
- 1955 - Dakilang Hudas
- 1956 - Takya
- 1956 - Ambrocia
- 1956 - Hokus-Pokus
- 1956 - Lalo Kitang Mahal
- 1956 - Umaalong Ginto
- 1956 - Huling Mandirigma
- 1957 - Kandilang Bakal
- 1957 - Objective: Patayin si Magsaysay
- 1958 - Water Lily
- 1958 - Obra-Maestra (segment "Macao")
- 1958 - Isang paa sa hukay
- 1959 - Ramona
- 1959 - Kamandag
- 1959 - Tough Guy
- 1960 - Cuatro Cantos
- 1961 - Tacio
- 1961 - Pantalan Trece
- 1961 - Asiong Salonga
- 1961 - North Harbor
- 1962 - Digmaan ng mga Maton
- 1962 - Bulilit Al Capone
- 1963 - The Macapagal Story
- 1963 - Sigaw ng Digmaan
- 1963 - Kayo ang Humatol
- 1963 - God Knows (Batid ng Diyos)
- 1963 - Istambay
- 1963 - Si Darna at ang Impakta
- 1964 - Ging
- 1964 - Pamatay:Kaliwa at Kanan...!
- 1965 - Genghis Bond: Agent 1-2-3
- 1966 - Operation Butterball
- 1966 - Dolpong Scarface
- 1966 - Ako'y Magbabalik!
- 1966 - Ito ang Pilipino
- 1967 - Kardong Kaliwa
- 1968 - Ngayon Lamang Ako Dumalangin
- 1968 - Mine Hunter
- 1969 - Rowena
- 1969 - Perlas ng Silangan
- 1969 - Mekeni's Gold
- 1969 - Dalawang Daigdig ni Carlota
- 1969 - Adriana
- 1970 - Inside Job
- 1970 - Omar Cassidy and the Sandalyas Kid
- 1970 - I Do Love You
- 1970 - Agent Silencer at Ang Pitong Brassieres
- 1970 - Memories of Our Dream
- 1970 - Renee Rose
- 1971 - Toro! Tora! Toray!
- 1971 - Guadalupe
- 1971 - Digmaan ng mga Angkan
- 1971 - Currimao
- 1972 - Ang Alamat
- 1973 - Florinda
- 1974 - Batingaw
