= Jose Panganiban, Camarines Norte =

Municipality in Camarines Norte, Philippines

Jose Panganiban Mambulao
- Municipality
- Municipality of Jose Panganiban
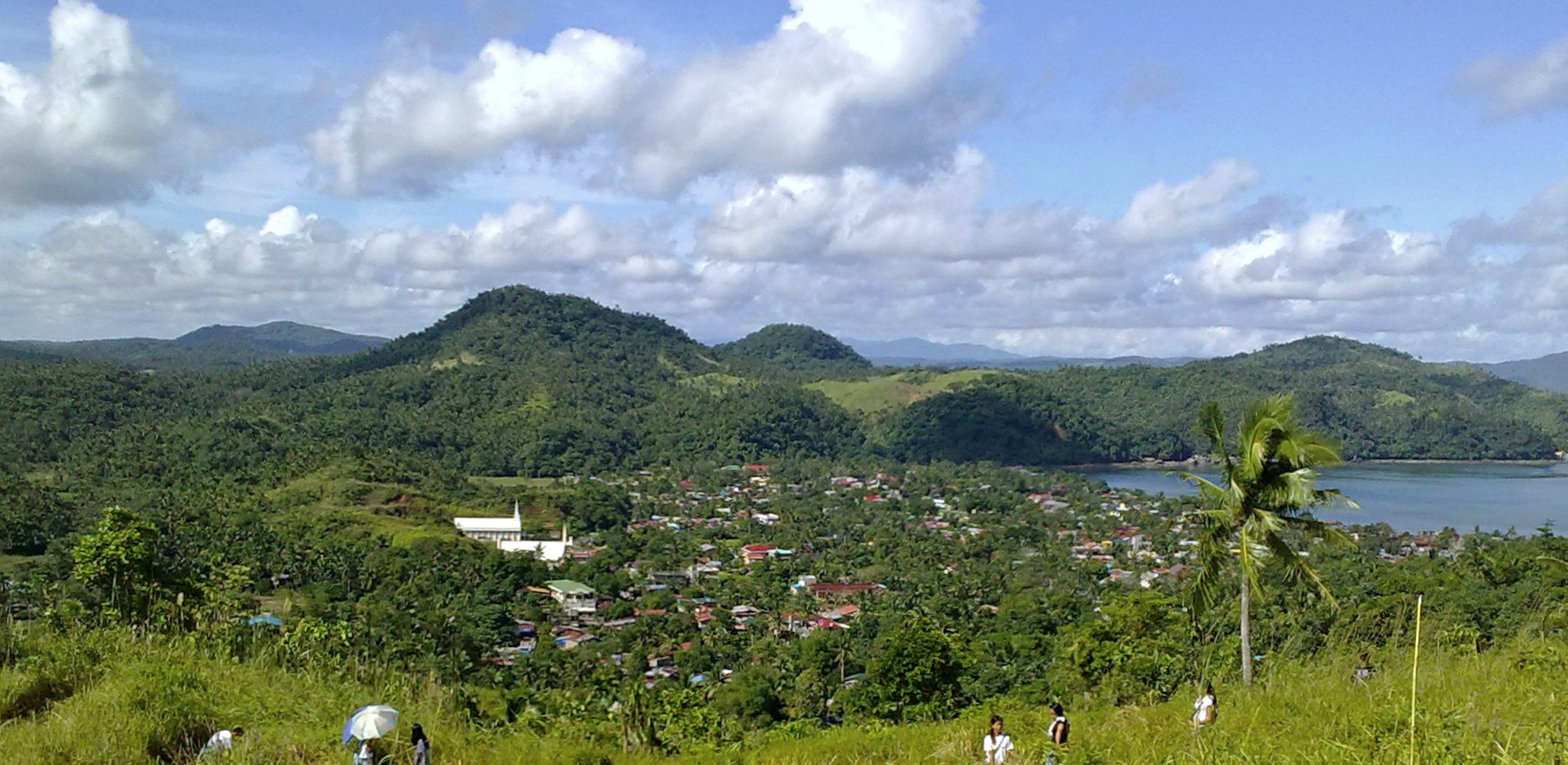
- View from the mountain

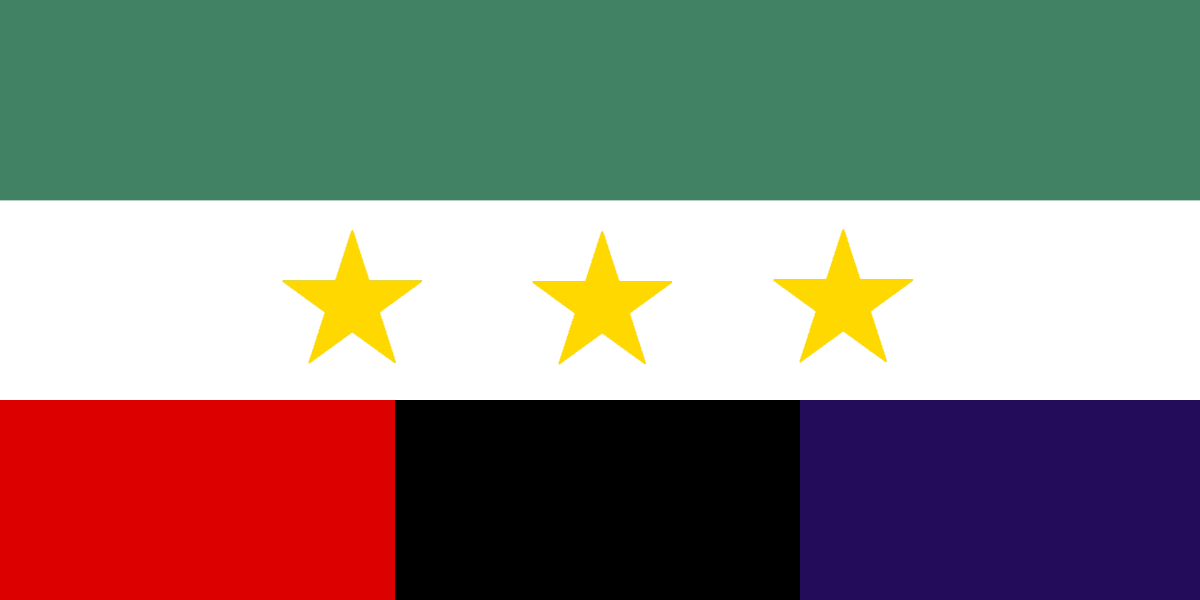
- Flag Seal
- Motto: Alay sa Diyos at sa Bayan
- Anthem: Mahal Kong Jose Panganiban (Mambulao Hymn)
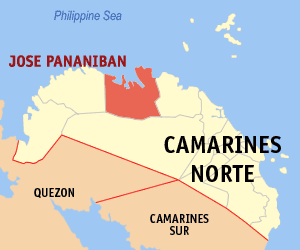
- Map of Camarines Norte with Jose Panganiban highlighted
- Interactive map of Jose Panganiban
- Location within the Philippines
- Coordinates: 14°17′32″N 122°41′34″E
- Country: Philippines
- Region: Bicol Region
- Province: Camarines Norte
- District: 1st district
- Founded: 1634
- Renamed: December 1, 1934
- Named for: Jose Maria Panganiban
- Barangays: 27 (see Barangays)

Government
  - Type: Sangguniang Bayan
  - Mayor: Ariel M. Non
  - Vice Mayor: Casimero B. Padilla, Jr.
  - Representative: Josefina B. Tallado
  - Municipal Council: Members: Artemio C. Andaya, Jr.; Maria Corazon G. Arenal; Catherine A. Dilao; Jan Michael O. Guzman; Francesca Angela S. Napa; Gracia R. Villablanca; Allaissa Mae C. Mapa; Jeroy Agustin Padilla
  - Electorate: 35,758 voters (2025)

Area
  - Total: 214.44 km^{2} (82.80 sq mi)
- Elevation: 43 m (141 ft)
- Highest elevation: 277 m (909 ft)
- Lowest elevation: 0 m (0 ft)

Population (2024 census)
  - Total: 60,626
  - Density: 282.72/km^{2} (732.24/sq mi)
  - Households: 14,560

Economy
  - Income class: 1st municipal income class
  - Poverty incidence: 28.53% (2023)
  - Revenue: ₱ 282.7 million (2024)
  - Assets: ₱ 919.1 million (2024)
  - Expenditure: ₱ 201.8 million (2024)
  - Liabilities: ₱ 237 million (2024)

Service provider
  - Electricity: Camarines Norte Electric Cooperative (CANORECO)
- Time zone: UTC+8 (PST)
- ZIP code: 4606
- PSGC: 0501605000
- IDD : area code: +63 (0)54
- Native languages: Tagalog; Manide
- Website: mambulao.gov.ph

Jose Panganiban, officially the Municipality of Jose Panganiban (Tagalog: Bayan ng Jose Panganiban), is a municipality in the province of Camarines Norte, Philippines. According to the 2024 census, it has a population of 60,626 people.

== Etymology ==
The municipality was formerly known as Mambulao, a word taken from "mambulawan", meaning bountiful in gold. On November 30, 1934, it was renamed to honor its native José María Panganiban by the virtue of Act 4155.

== History ==
Originally known as Mambulao, the town began as a thriving pre-Spanish indigenous community supported by agriculture and fishing before enduring centuries of Spanish colonial rule. Following resistance against Japanese occupation during World War II, the town was rebuilt and later renamed Jose Panganiban, after a native revolutionary hero.

On January 30, 1988, 25-year-old mayor-elect Ronaldo Padilla, brother of actor Robin Padilla, died when the vehicle he was driving along a national highway in Libmanan, Camarines Sur hit a ten-wheeler truck; he had been the winning substitute candidate for his brother Roy Padilla Jr., who was forced to take the place of their father, Roy Padilla Sr., when he was assassinated 13 days earlier.

== Geography ==
=== Barangays ===
Jose Panganiban is politically subdivided into 27 barangays. Each barangay consists of puroks and some have sitios.

- Bagong Bayan
- Calero
- Dahican
- Dayhagan
- Larap
- Luklukan Norte
- Luklukan Sur
- Motherlode
- Nakalaya
- Osmeña
- Pag-Asa
- Parang
- Plaridel
- North Poblacion
- South Poblacion
- Salvacion
- San Isidro
- San Jose
- San Martin
- San Pedro
- San Rafael
- Santa Cruz
- Santa Elena
- Santa Milagrosa
- Santa Rosa Norte
- Santa Rosa Sur
- Tamisan

=== Climate ===
Climate data for Jose Panganiban, Camarines Norte
Month	Jan	Feb	Mar	Apr	May	Jun	Jul	Aug	Sep	Oct	Nov	Dec	Year
Mean daily maximum °C (°F)	27 (81)	27 (81)	29 (84)	31 (88)	31 (88)	30 (86)	29 (84)	29 (84)	29 (84)	29 (84)	28 (82)	27 (81)	29 (84)
Mean daily minimum °C (°F)	22 (72)	22 (72)	22 (72)	23 (73)	25 (77)	25 (77)	25 (77)	24 (75)	24 (75)	24 (75)	24 (75)	23 (73)	24 (74)
Average precipitation mm (inches)	85 (3.3)	55 (2.2)	53 (2.1)	47 (1.9)	112 (4.4)	156 (6.1)	213 (8.4)	159 (6.3)	201 (7.9)	216 (8.5)	197 (7.8)	141 (5.6)	1,635 (64.5)
Average rainy days	15.4	11.6	13.6	12.3	19.9	23.7	27.3	26.0	26.0	24.6	21.8	19.1	241.3
Source: Meteoblue

Climate in the Philippines is classified into four types. Camarines Norte's climate is classified under Type II, which is characterized by the absence of a dry season, with maximum rain period occurring between December and February, and minimum monthly rainfall occurring between March and May.

The northeast monsoon moves mainly north and northeast trending to easterly towards the end of the season. Average temperature ranges from 20 degrees Celsius to 28.3 degrees Celsius. Wind averages 15 to 20 miles per hour and is steadiest during January. The southeast monsoon is prevalent from June to September and is steadiest during the months of July and August, with wind speeds averaging from 10 to 15 miles per hour. The hottest months are from March to June, while the coolest months are from November to January.

Occurrences of rainfall in Jose Panganiban are more frequent during the predominance of the northeast monsoon between the months of October and May with maximum occurrence in November and December.

The highest rise in temperature occurs during the months of May and June, averaging between 28.9 degrees Celsius and 29 degrees Celsius. The coolest months are between December and February, with average ranging between 26.0 degrees Celsius and 26.4 degrees Celsius.

Relative humidity is the amount of water vapour present in the air. The municipality's normal relative humidity is at its highest and the steadiest between the months of September and December, while it is at its lowest between the months of April and June, the hottest months per year.

== Demographics ==
The earliest available demographic data was the Census of the Philippine Islands conducted by the United States Bureau of Census in 1903. The then municipality of Mambulao, comprising nine barrios, has a total population of 1,370. The nine barrios are Poblacion (458), Del Rosario (60), San Antonio (33), San Isidro (99), San Jose (287), San Rafael (163), Santa Cruz (75), Santa Elena (81) and Santa Rosa (114).

Population census of Jose Panganiban
Year	Pop.	±% p.a.
1903	1,370	—
1918	2,035	+2.67%
1939	20,889	+11.73%
1948	8,485	−9.53%
1960	27,144	+10.17%
1970	34,164	+2.32%
1975	32,746	−0.85%
1980	30,260	−1.57%
1990	44,408	+3.91%
1995	45,396	+0.41%
2000	46,064	+0.31%
2007	49,028	+0.86%
2010	55,557	+4.65%
2015	59,639	+1.36%
2020	63,662	+1.38%
2024	60,626	−1.17%
Source: Philippine Statistics Authority

In the 2024 census, the population of Jose Panganiban was 60,626 people, with a density of 280 inhabitants per square kilometre or 730 inhabitants per square mile.

== Economy ==
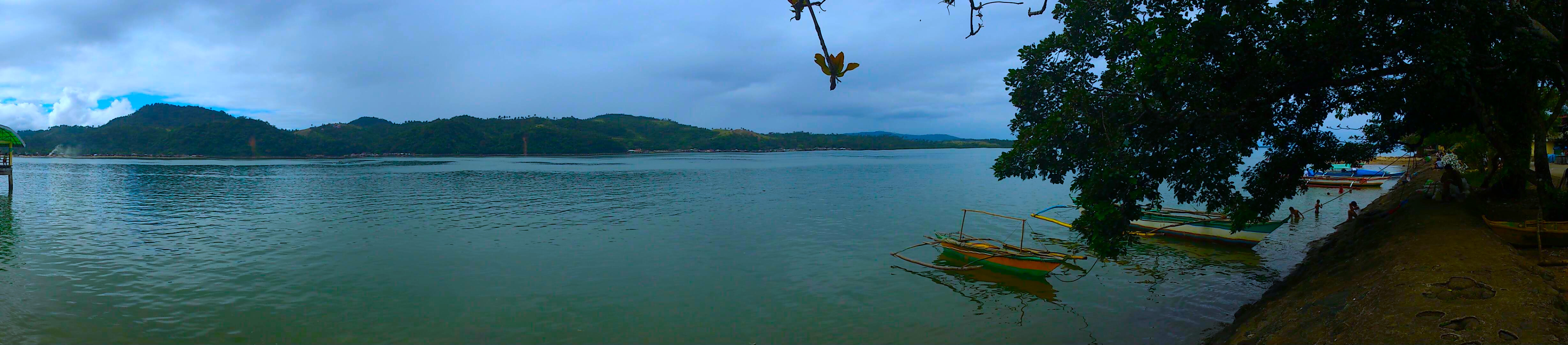
Mambulao Bay

Poverty incidence of Jose Panganiban (%)

Source: Philippine Statistics Authority

=== Mining ===
It is known that even before the colonizers came, Mambulao was already a flourishing mining town. It was the Spaniards, drawn by the rumor of immense gold deposits in the Mambulao-Paracale district, who mastered in exploring the gold mining potentials of these towns.

From the 1750s to 1800s, Paracale held the major Spanish mines, but due to its closure in the 1790s, its people were living in desultory gold washing, fishing and selling betel nut to Mambulao, which has now become the mining center. During that time, there were plenty of small shops but there's no rice fields and vegetable gardening. All necessities came from Ambos Camarines and Tayabas (Quezon). Fifteen years later, the mines of Mambulao were no longer open. There was still some haphazard gold washing by women of Indio Class whose husbands, it was alleged, gambled away their meager earning in card games run by the town mayor. But by 1818, the population was back to the levels of the 1790s and by the mid-1820s annual gold production levels ran as 3,200 ounces (90.7 kg.) worth Php. 44,000 at prevailing prices. By 1829, Camarines Norte was considered to be wealthy and populous enough to warrant separation as province of its own for the first time. But after the 1840s the mining and population declined. Dr. Fedor Jagor (in his book Travels in the Philippines and The former Philippines thru Foreign Eyes), a well known German traveler who visited Mambulao in 1859, reported that it was thinly populated and that the mining mania was already ruined. From 1837 to 1876 the population of Mambulao and Paracale decreased by 30%.

From 1900 until the early twenties, Mambulao was a sleepy town, isolated from the other towns of Camarines Norte. During the gold bloom, it was dubbed as "Little Manila", due to flourishing business operated by Filipinos, Chinese, Japanese, Syrians and many others. Dutch-born Filipino citizen Jan Hendrik Marsman operated two rich mines during the American occupation, a substantial dredging operation and the Philippines only smelter located in the Mambulao- Paracale district. The population quadrupled between 1918 and 1938. One of the most notable mining company to operate in this municipality is the Philippine Iron Mines, then the largest iron mine in Asia.

Mining companies operating in Jose Panganiban include:

- Philippine Iron Mines (defunct) 1925 to 1975, then biggest iron mine in Asia
- San Mauricio Mining Company (defunct) 1933
- Benguet Gold Mining Corporation (defunct)
- Motherlode Mining Company (defunct)
- J. G. Realty and Mining Company (defunct) 1987-1997
- Johson Gold Mining Corporation
- Investwell Mining (mining arm of Isabelo Fonacier Mining)
- Ferro Management and Consultancy Group Inc. (FMCGI) 2008

=== Jose Panganiban Special Economic Zones ===
- JP-SEZ (1): Jose Panganiban SEZ, located in Barangay Osmeña, is a special economic zone created through Proclamation No. 1106 by former President Gloria Macapagal Arroyo on July 20, 2006. It consists of a total land area of three hundred sixty-one thousand seven hundred eleven (361,711) square meters and has its own private port registered at the Philippine Ports Authority. Magna-Kron Realty Philippines, Inc. is the current registered operator of the economic zone since 2018, succeeding Camnorte Ezone Realty, Inc. Magnakron Oleo Philippines, Inc. is a manufacturer of coconut-based ingredients and natural oil derivatives used for personal care (beauty and cosmetic products), consumer products, lubricants, fluids and oilfield, plastics, food and pharma, and, coatings, paints and inks. Primo Oleochemicals, Inc. and Pan Century Surfactants Inc. under the Aditya Birla Group formerly operated in the area.
- JP-SEZ (2): The second economic zone, located in Barangay Larap, was created under Proclamation No. 508 by former President Gloria Macapagal Arroyo on December 2, 2003. It is operated by the municipal government of Jose Panganiban under the name Global Industrial/Maritime Complex and has a total area of 30 hectares. In February 2018, the municipal government of Jose Panganiban made a lease contract agreement with Penson & Company, Inc. to develop the area as a model community and jewel of urban development in the Bicol region. The area, expanded to a total of 230 hectares, will house the Larap Integrated Development Project. The Larap Integrated Development Project will be divided into four (4) major components which include the Airport Zone, Aero Entertainment Park, Town Center, and Industrial Zone. The project site is 5 kilometers away from the town proper. The project cost is estimated at PHP2,244,000,000.00. Resettlement issues such as loss of livelihood opportunities are the main concern about the project raised by the residents of Purok 7 of Barangay Larap. It is estimated that about 200 households will be affected by the project. The LGU of Jose Panganiban implemented a resettlement program to address the issue. The Larap Integrated Development Corporation (LIDC) has granted the LGU PHP20 million for the resettlement of the affected households.

== Tourism ==
=== Historical landmarks ===
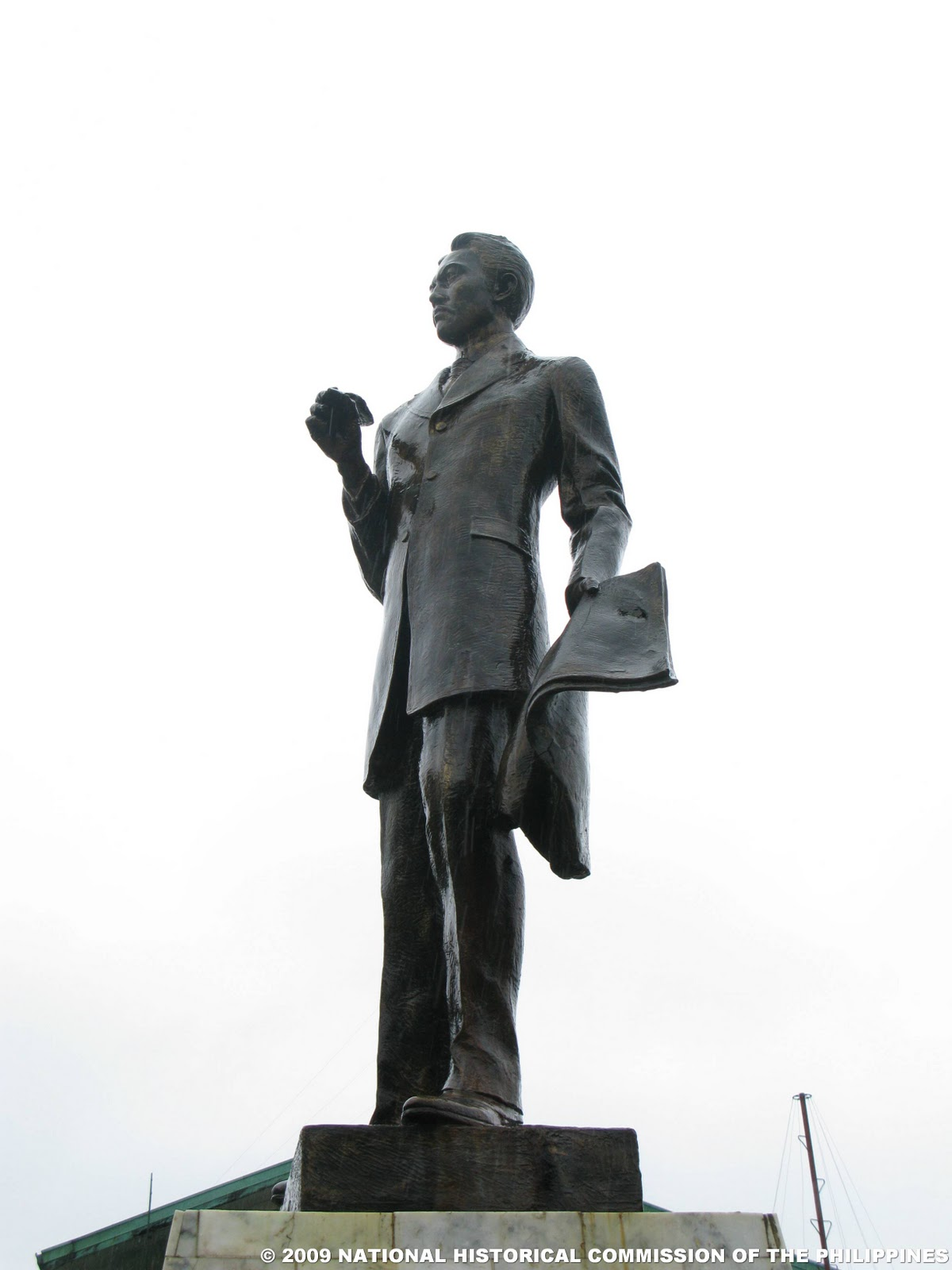
Jose Maria Panganiban y Enverga's Monument in front of the Municipal Hall. Known to have "Memoria Fotografia", JOMAPA (his pen name) contributed to La Solidaridad.

- Jose Maria Panganiban Monument - installed on February 1, 1985, by the National Historical Institute which contains the remains of the home-grown hero
- Roy Padilla Sr. Monument - located inside Doña Ponay park, is a monument installed as a remembrance to Governor Casimero Ruiz Padilla, father of famous and political personalities in the Philippines today. Known for his excellent leadership skill, he was undefeated in all of his political campaigns. He was assassinated in Labo, Camarines Norte at the age of 61.

=== Islands and beach destinations ===
- Parola Island - a popular island destination in Jose Panganiban famous for its pink sand shoreline, powdery beach, and clear blue water. The island got its name from a small light tower found in the island which guides fishermen at night. Tourists are advised to contact the Municipal Tourism Office when planning to visit the island.
- Calalanay Island - This small island is a 30-minute boat ride from Larap Port. It is locally known for its white sand beach and clear blue water coming from the Philippine Sea. Tourists are advised to contact the Municipal Tourism Office when planning to visit the island.
- Isla ni Cion - Aside from its long stretch of white sand beach, Isla ni Cion boasts of its mangrove eco-park which the locals proudly take care of. A bamboo walkway will lead tourists through this dense mangrove forest. Visitors can take a boat ride from Larap port to reach this area.
- Pag-asa Beach - located in Barangay Pag-asa, this popular beach destination for locals is heavily visited during the months of March, April, and May. Small cottages and a public restroom are maintained by locals.
- Bulalacao Beach - a 30-minute travel, via motorcycle, tricycle, jeepney or your own vehicle, from the town proper, will get you to Bulalacao Beach in Barangay Luklukan Sur. The beach is named after meteor sightings by locals. Scenic views along the road will welcome tourists on their way to the beach. Bringing your own tent (tolda) or picnic table is advisable for groups visiting the area.

=== Other local spots ===
- Fil-Nippon Fountain of Friendship Park - located in Barangay North Poblacion, Fil-Nippon Fountain of Friendship Park (or simply known as Fountain) is a park built as a symbol of friendship between Filipinos and Japanese and as a remembrance of the town's rich history with the Japanese during the time of Philippine Iron Mines.
- Doña Ponay Park - located in Barangay South Poblacion, Doña Ponay park is built as a remembrance to Doña Apolinaria de los Reyes, popularly known as Doña Ponay, a former resident of Monte Calogcog (now known as Barangay Luklukan Norte). Her most popular story was her gift to Queen Isabella of Spain; a life-size hen with 12 chicks standing on a platter made of solid gold.
- Mambulao Boardwalk - located in Barangay North Poblacion, adjacent to Fil-Nippon Fountain of Friendship Park, Mambulao Boardwalk is a popular spot for locals to see the sun setting over Mambulao Bay.
- Turayog Resort - located in Barangay Luklukan Norte, Turayog Resort is increasingly becoming popular among tourists and locals with its viewing deck which gives a 360-degree view of the town of Jose Panganiban.

== Infrastructure ==
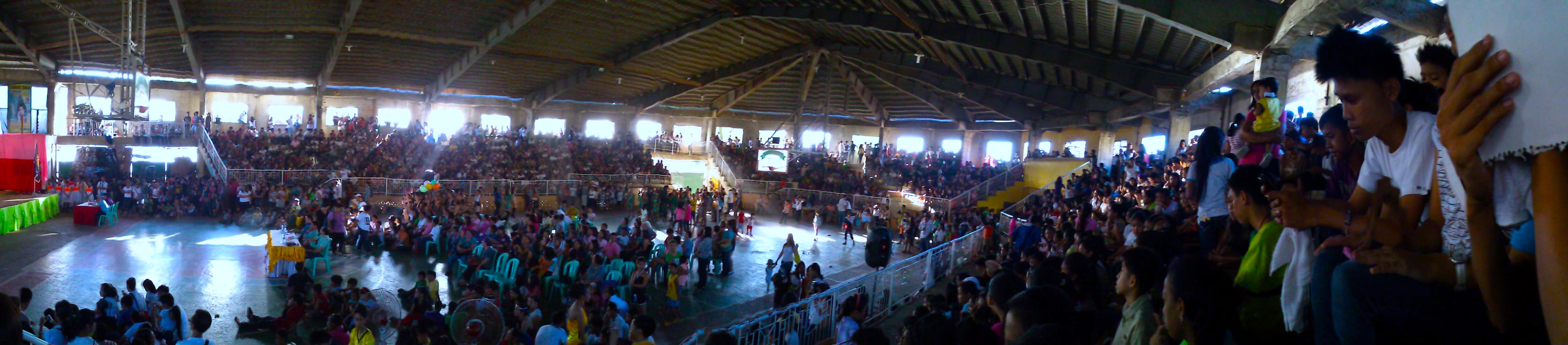
Inside Roy Padilla Sr. Memorial Stadium

=== Airport and Seaports ===
The Larap (Jose Panganiban) Airport (ICAO Code: RPUP), formerly operated by the Philippine Iron Mines, covers an area of approximately 35 hectares and with existing 1,400 meter stretched runway. It is located at Latitude 14°17′28″N Longitude 122°38′46″E.

- In January 2018, mobilization for the construction of Larap Regional Airport immediately began after the ceremonial groundbreaking of Larap Integrated Development Project. Penson and Company, Inc., who will build and operate the airport, expects to rehabilitate the existing 1400 meter runway by 2018 then upgrade its length to 1900–2000 meters by 2019. The airport is expected to operate commercially by 2021.
- The nearest commercial airports that operate regularly are Naga Airport (126 km away) in Pili, Camarines Sur and Bicol International Airport (216 km away) in Albay.

The International Port of Jose Panganiban (Latitude 14° 17’N Longitude 122° 42’E) is nearly 2 miles wide at the entrance between Calambayungan Island and Pinandungan Point and with sea distance to Manila of 468.10 nautical miles.The port is situated at Barangay Osmeña which is approximately five (5) kilometers away from the town proper of Jose Panganiban. The port serves as the passage of all water borne traffic to and from the Paracale mining area, Larap., Lucena, other Quezon town and the rest of Bicol and Visayas provinces. Copra, coconut oil and copra pellets used to be its principal exports.

The Port of Larap Bay is a natural coastal harbor situated at Barangay Larap (Latitude 14° 18' 36" N Longitude 122° 39' 0" E), currently serving the needs of a local mining company. The harbor entrance is restricted due to swell.

The Private Port of Jose Panganiban SEZ is located inside Magnakron Oleo Philippines, Inc. It is registered at the Philippines Ports Authority with registration type P/NC and is being operated by Magnakron Realty Philippines, Inc.

=== Public Land Transportation ===
The municipal's public transportation needs are provided by Tricycles, Jeepneys (Route: Downtown to Mountainous Villages), Vans (Route: Jose Panganiban to Daet), and Buses (Routes: Jose Panganiban to Daet via Labo, Jose Panganiban to Tabaco, Albay via Naga City, and Jose Panganiban to Metro Manila). Philtranco, Superlines, and Elavil serve the Jose Panganiban/Paracale-Metro Manila route.

=== Electricity and Water Supply ===
Jose Panganiban is being served by the National Power Corporation through CANORECO (Camarines Norte Electric Cooperative). A Coal Power Plant is set to be built by H and WB Asia Pacific Pte. Ltd. by 4th quarter of 2017 which is expected to generate a total of 700 Megawatts of power supply by 2025.

Water supply and treatment is provided by Jose Panganiban Water District, a local cooperative. The water system of Jose Panganiban Water District (JPWD) includes surface water and groundwater (through wells) as water source. It also consists of treatment facilities, pumping facilities, reservoir, pipelines and service connections. It was constructed in 1953 with the concrete intake structure (Paltic Dam) along Paltic Creek, a reservoir, pipelines and service connections as its original facilities. A series of rehabilitation projects had been implemented in Jose Panganiban consisting of source development (well drilling and construction of surface water source), provision of electromechanical facilities, pipeline extension to adjacent barangays and installation of additional service connections.

=== Communication ===
Mambulao Cable Television and JP Cable TV System provide digital cable services and fixed-line internet connection throughout the municipality. Smart Communications, Globe Telecom, and Sun Cellular are the mobile, fixed-line, broadband, 3G and 4G internet Service provider. International Calls are provided by the Local Government for free. Town FM 89.3 also broadcasts from the municipality.

=== Medical Institutions ===
- Jose Panganiban Rural Health Unit 1 - Barangay South Poblacion (East District)
- Jose Panganiban Rural Health Unit 2 - Barangay Larap (West District)
- Jose Panganiban Primary Hospital Services Coop. - Barangay North Poblacion
- Barrios-Busiños Medical Clinic and Hospital - Barangay Santa Rosa Norte

== Education ==
There are two schools district offices which govern all educational institutions within the municipality. They oversee the management and operations of all private and public, from primary to secondary schools. These are the:

- Jose Panganiban East Schools District
- Jose Panganiban West Schools District
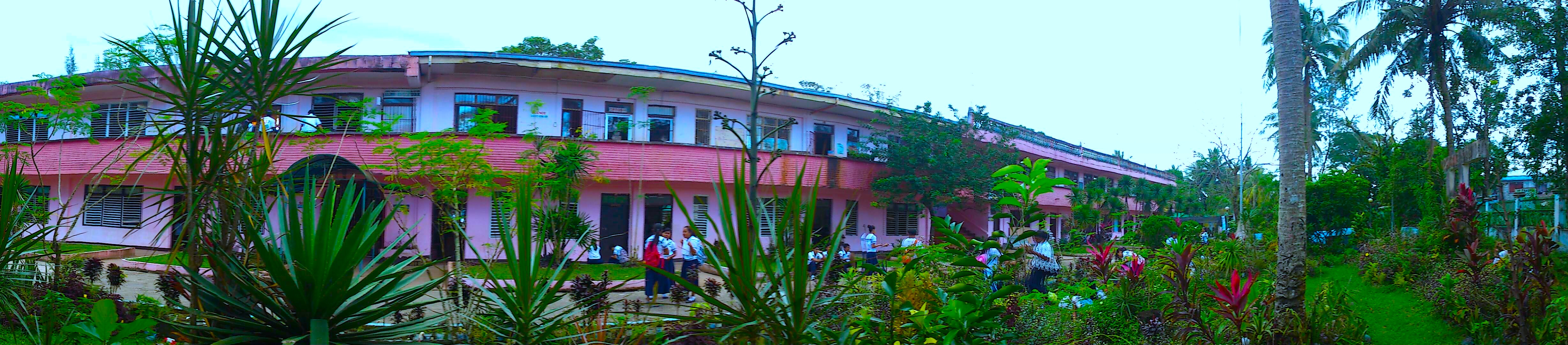
Jose Panganiban National High School's Administration Building (2011)

=== Primary and elementary schools ===
East District:

- Calero Elementary School
- Calogcog Elementary School
- Jose Panganiban Elementary School
- Osmena Elementary School
- Parang Elementary School
- Regino A. Yet Elementary School
- Roman V. Heraldo Elementary School
- San Mauricio Elementary School
- San Rafael Elementary School
- Santa Rosa Norte Elementary School
- Segundo Aguirre Elementary School

West District:

- C.B. Enverga (Santa Cruz) Elementary School
- D. Albonia (Tamisan) Elementary School
- Dahican Elementary School
- L.D. Bamba (Dayhagan) Elementary School
- Larap Elementary School
- Nakalaya Elementary School
- Pagasa Elementary School
- Sta Elena Elementary School
- San Isidro Elementary School
- San Jose Elementary School
- San Pedro Elementary School
- San Martin Elementary School
- Sta Milagrosa Elementary School
- Tawig (Salvacion) Elementary School
- V. Gabo Elementary School
- Ulipanan Elementary School

=== Private Schools ===
Listed below are private schools currently included in the Department of Education's Masterlist.

- Ananda Marga Special Academic Institution
- Ave Maria Children's Center
- Good Shepherd Christian Learning
- St. Roch Children's Center
- Montessori de Mambulao Learning Centre
- Wonderkids Science Montessori School

=== Secondary schools ===
- Gawad Kalinga High School
- Jose Panganiban National High School
- Larap National High School
- Santa Cruz National High School

=== Higher educational institutions ===
- Camarines Norte State College - Jose Panganiban Campus (College of Engineering and Industrial Technology) formerly Camarines Norte School of Arts and Trades
- Roy Padilla Sr. (JP) Memorial Technical and Vocational Training Center (TESDA-accredited)

== Media ==
=== Radio stations ===
- Hot FM 94.3 - Jose Panganiban (No Longer in Broadcast)
- Town FM 89.3 - Jose Panganiban (No Longer in Broadcast)

== Sister cities ==
- (Philippines) Makati
- (Philippines) Valenzuela City

== Gallery ==
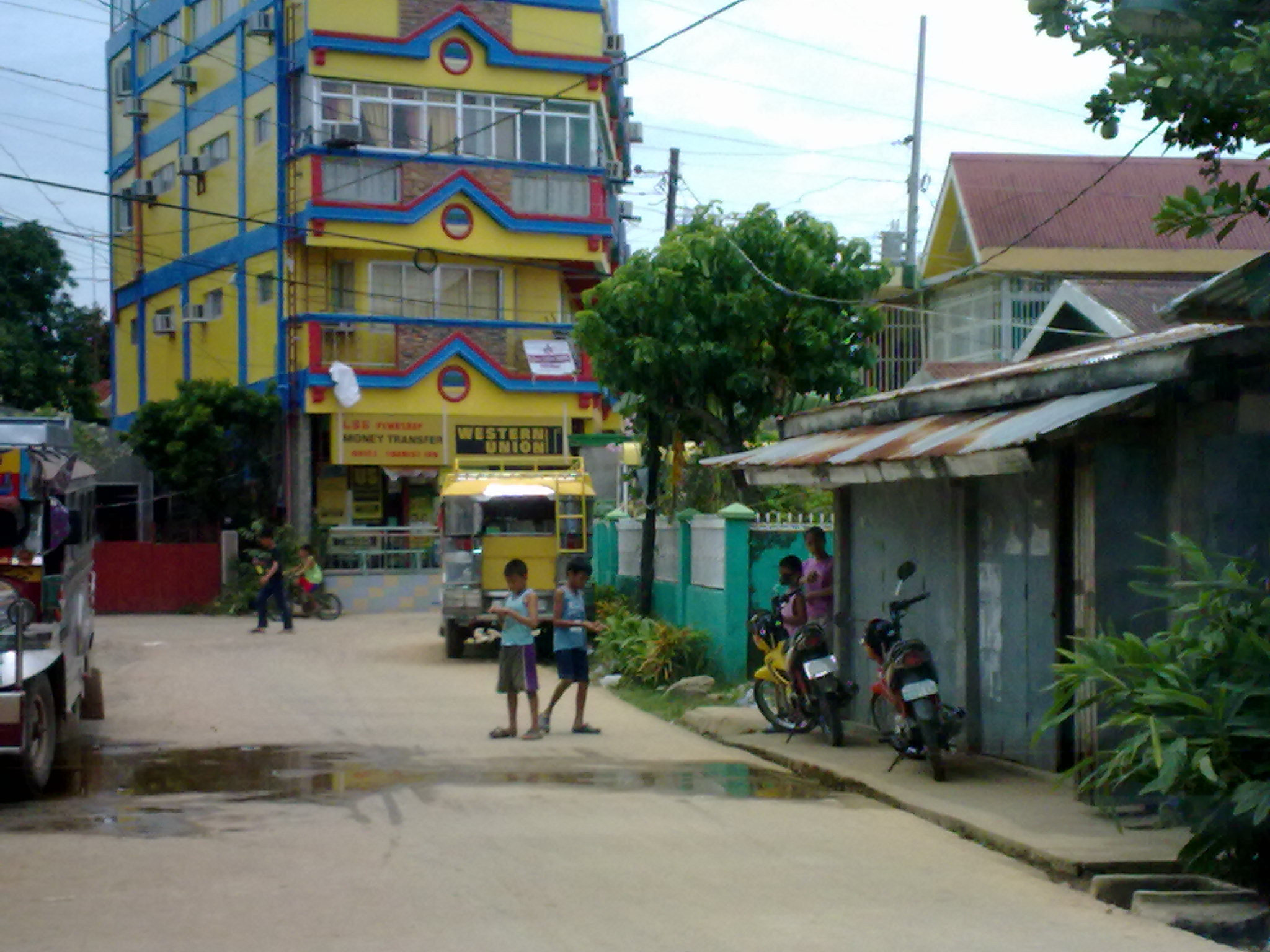
Market Site

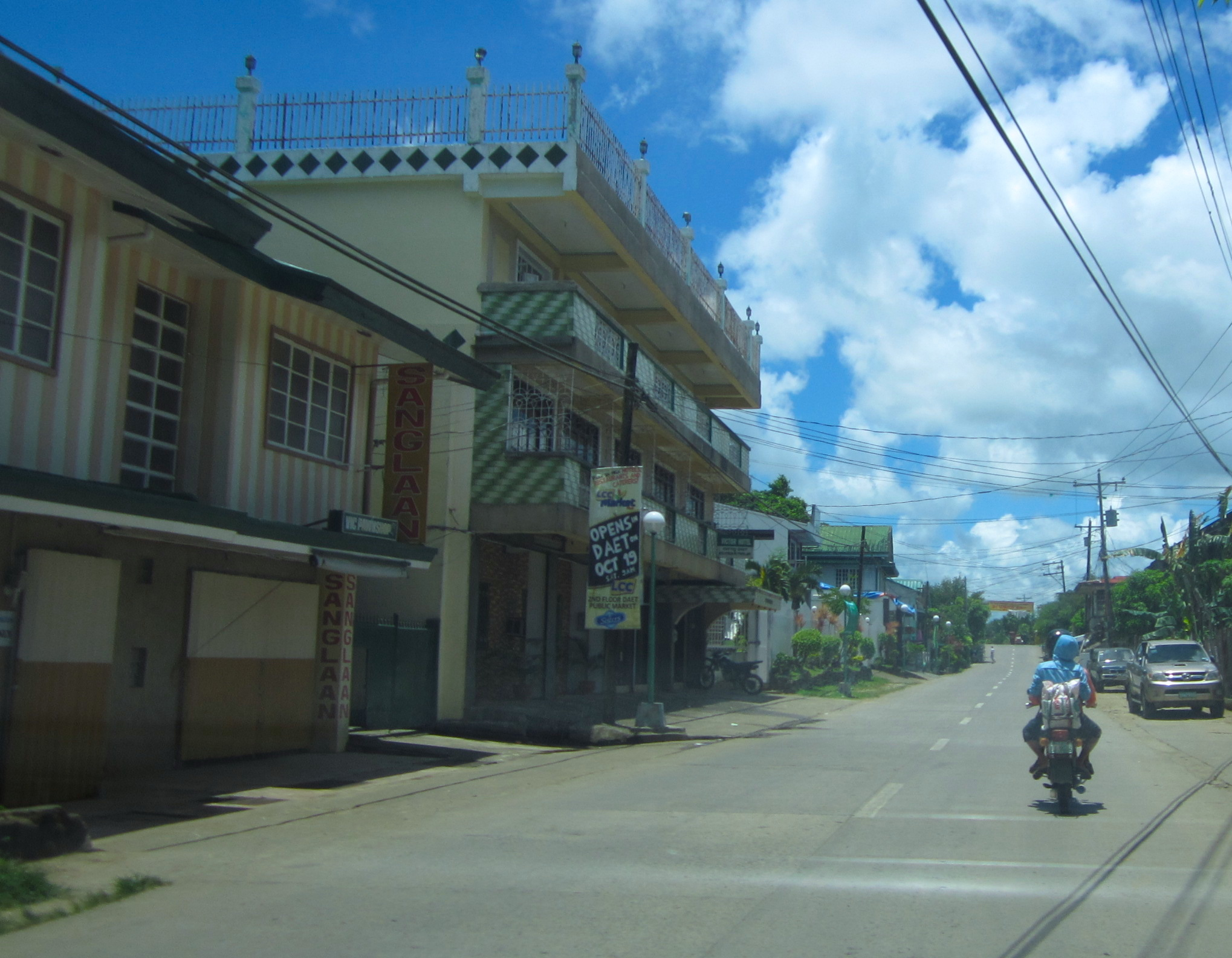
Jose Rizal Street

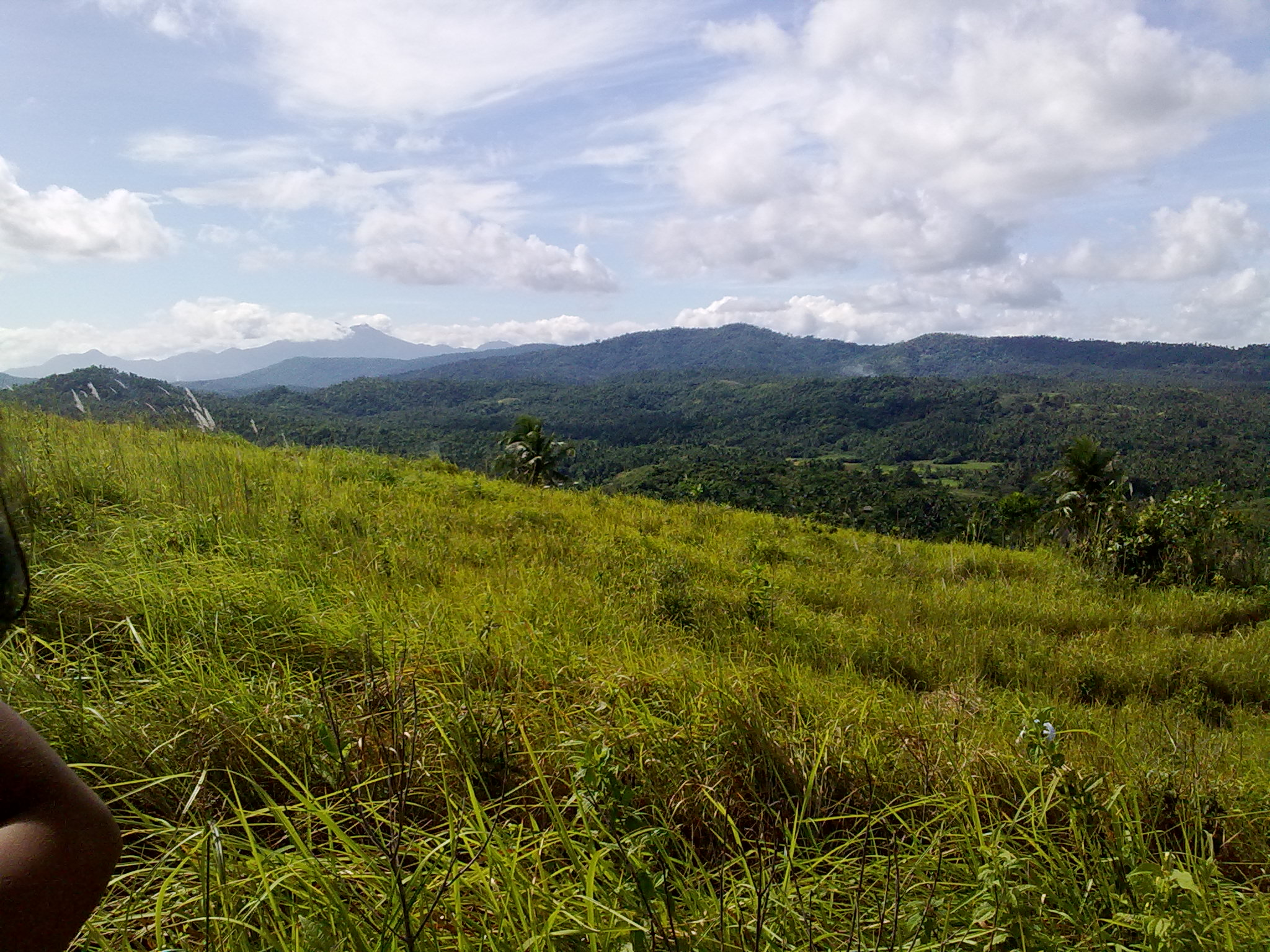
Santa Rosa Norte

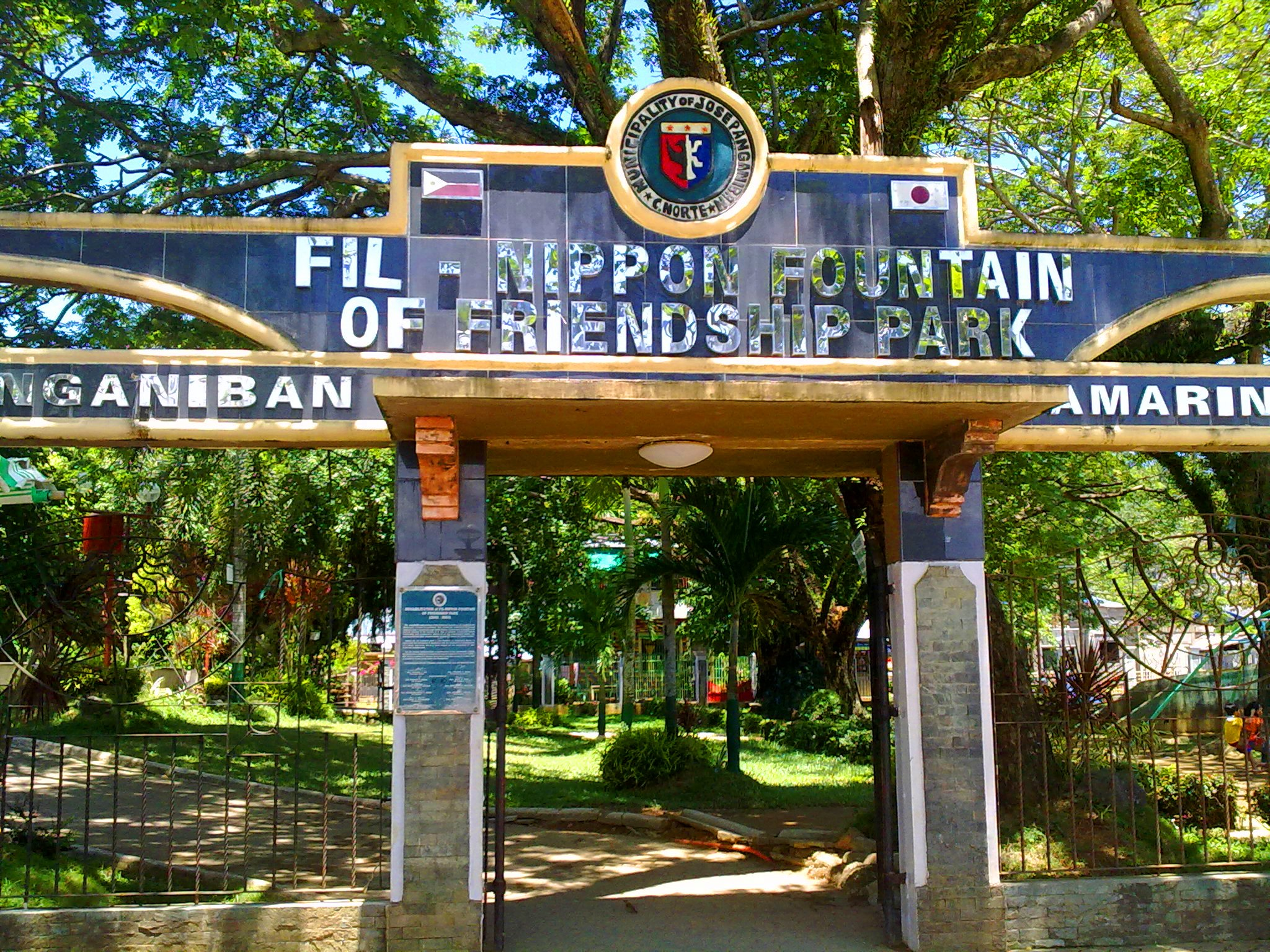
Fil-Nippon Fountain of Friendship Park

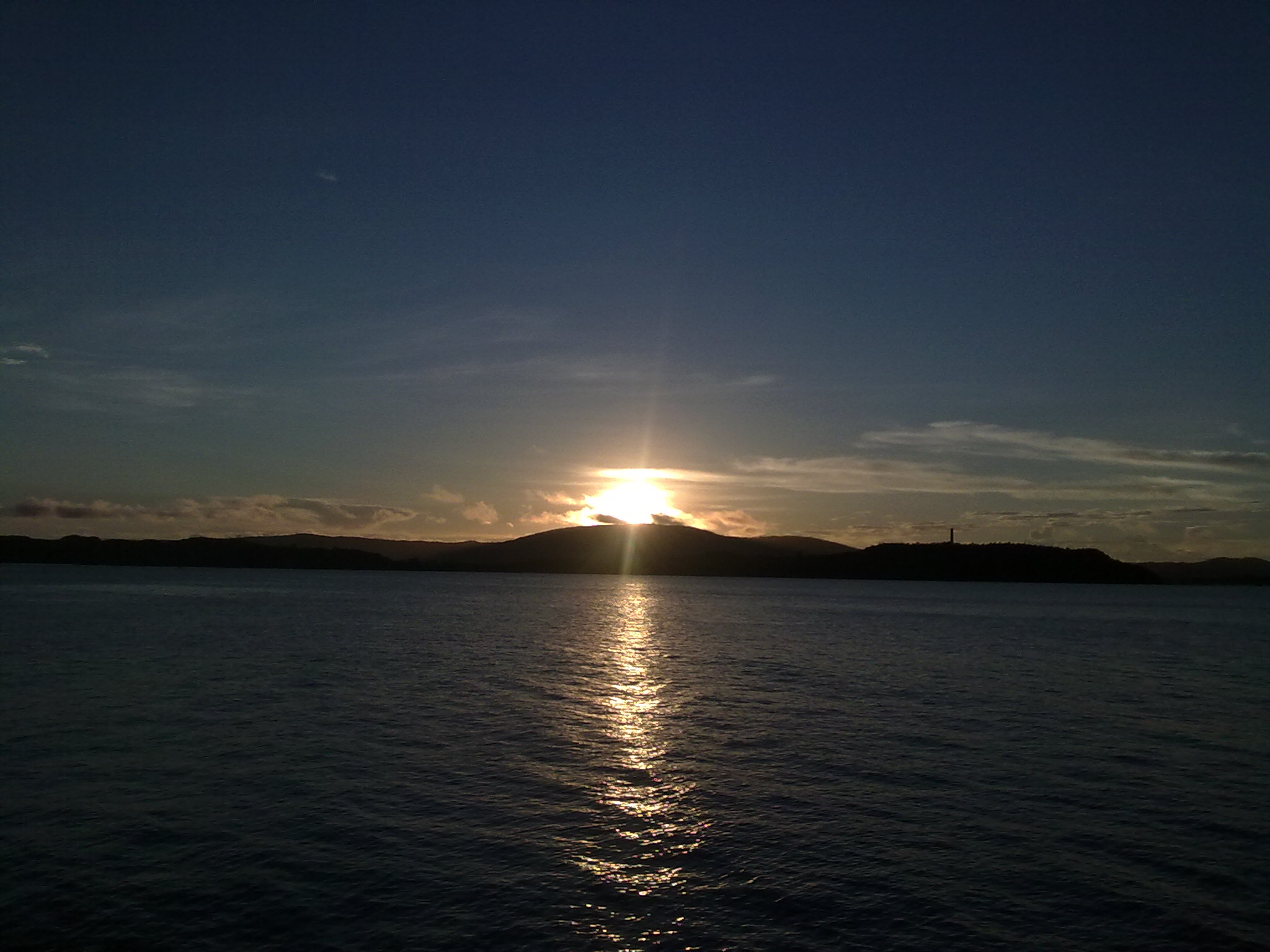
Sunset viewed from a defunct seaport

== Notable ==
- Ricarte Padilla, filipino politician who currently serves as the Governor of Camarines Norte
- José María Panganiban, filipino propagandist, linguist, and essayist. He is one of the main writers and contributors for La Solidaridad, writing under the pen names "Jomapa" and "J.M.P."
- Jiggy Manicad, journalist newscaster; currently serving as an anchor of TV5's 5:30 pm newscast for Una Sa Lahat.

== See also ==
- List of renamed cities and municipalities in the Philippines
