= Rommel Padilla =

Filipino businessman, actor and politician

Member of the Nueva Ecija Provincial Board from the 1st district
- In office June 30, 2016 – June 30, 2019
- In office June 30, 2007 – June 30, 2010

Personal details
- Born: Rommel Cariño Padilla; January 4, 1965 (age 61) Manila, Philippines
- Party: PFP (2024–present)
- Other political affiliations: PDP–Laban (2021–2024); Independent (2018–2021); BALANE (2007–2018); KAMPI (2007)
- Spouses: Anabelle Antonio (annulled) Charisse Hibek (m. 2011)
- Relations: Padilla family
- Children: 10, including RJ and Daniel
- Parent(s): Roy Padilla Sr. Lolita Eva Cariño
- Occupation: Actor, businessman, politician, farmer, musician
- Nickname(s): Roms, Omeng

Rommel Cariño Padilla (Tagalog pronunciation: [paˈdilja]; born January 4, 1965), nicknamed "Omeng", is a Filipino actor, politician, farmer and former musician. He served as a member of the Nueva Ecija Provincial Board from 2007 to 2010 and 2016 to 2019.

On several occasions, Padilla ran for different elective positions in government and lost: for vice governor of Nueva Ecija (2010), for representative of Nueva Ecija's 1st District (2019, 2022), and for mayor of Cuyapo, Nueva Ecija (2025). He is the father of actors RJ and Daniel Padilla.

== Early life ==
He was born to Camarines Norte governor Roy Padilla Sr. (1926–1988) and actress Eva Cariño.

Padilla has at least 48 siblings. Padilla's full siblings from the same parents are: Rowena (born 1959), Randolf (died 1980s), Rema, Royette (1962–2021), Roda, Robinhood ("Robin", born 1969), and Richelda (born 1971). One of his full siblings, BB Gandanghari (formerly Rustom; born 1967), is transgender, while his youngest full sibling, Romulus, died at four days old in 1975. Among his other siblings are half-brothers Roberto (1947–2014), Roy Jr. (1948–), Ronaldo (1962–1988), Roger, Ricarte (born 1965) and Rodolfo ("Gino"; 1974/1975–2002), and half-sisters Rebecca and Carmela.

== Entertainment career ==
Prior to becoming an actor, Padilla was a bass player for the Brothers Band based in Angeles City, Pampanga.

== Political career ==
His political inclinations can be traced from his grandfather, José Padilla Sr., former governor of Bulacan province, Philippines, and his father, Casimero "Roy" Padilla Sr., former governor of Camarines Norte province who was assassinated during the 1988 gubernatorial election.

Padilla was elected Nueva Ecija Provincial Board member in 2007.

In 2010, he ran for the vice governorship of Nueva Ecija under the local party Bagong Lakas ng Nueva Ecija (BALANE), but lost to Gay "GP" Padiernos.

Once again, in 2016, ran under BALANE party, he was elected as senior board member of the province's First District.

He also ran twice in failed bids to represent the First District in the Congress. Being an independent candidate in 2019, he lost to his lone opponent, then-incumbent Rep. Estrellita "Ging" Suansing.

In the 2022 national elections, Padilla, ran under PDP–Laban, and his another opponent, former Philippine Charity Sweepstakes Office chief Alexander Balutan, were both defeated by outgoing Rep. Estrellita's daughter, Mika Suansing.

== Personal life ==
Padilla has fathered ten children with at least four women. He had three children with his first wife Anabelle Antonio of Angeles, Pampanga: Ralph Matthew ("Matt", born 1980s), Ronnel Jake (born 1989) and Roanna Marie (born 1992). While Rommel was in jail and appealing his case in late 1998, Anabelle had to work for their children on his behalf. She was a bassist in Japan while their children was in Rommel's sister, Rowena Padilla's care in Kidapawan, Mindanao for six years. Actor and musician Daniel Padilla (born 1995) is Padilla's son with singer-actress Karla Estrada, whom Rommel met in 1990 while at work in Viva Entertainment. While Padilla was in prison, Karla gave birth to Daniel and took their child for him to see for the first time after 3 years. His daughter Romina Red was born to Edna Mendoza. Padilla has since married Charisse Hibek, with whom he had two children: Aryana Royce Allih and Arize Jose.

Padilla previously dated actresses Jean Garcia and Michelle Aldana in the mid-1990s.

Padilla is a Muslim, having converted to the Islamic faith in 1999 after his brother Robin's own conversion while in prison in 1996. He claimed that he was wedded to Karla Estrada in a Muslim wedding presided by Robin, arguing that he was allowed to marry multiple wives based on his faith.

Rommel is said to be friends with his wives, and his children from them has no friction as they treat each other "whole" brothers/sisters, not "half".

=== Imprisonment ===
On October 27, 1996 at around 10:30 pm, in front of a convenience store at the intersection of Ortigas Avenue Extension and De Castro Avenue in Brgy. Sta. Lucia, Pasig, Padilla and his flight steward friend Frederick Luna were arrested by East Police District-Drug Enforcement Unit.

The policemen had just finished a drug bust operation when they found a .45 caliber handgun tucked in Luna's waistband. 100 grams of dried marijuana leaves was also found on him. Padilla got off his Nissan Sentra car to reportedly intervene for his friend's release. The lawmen searched his car and found in the passenger seat the .22 Magnum machine pistol that caused them to charge him of illegal possession of firearms. Padilla told police he was on his way to shoot scenes for his then-upcoming film Dimas at Magdalena in that night when they stopped by the store.

On October 29, 1996, Padilla was released after posting a Php 120,000 bail. He was accompanied by his mother, Eva Cariño, his girlfriend at the time, Jean Garcia, and his other relatives.

On November 12, 1996, the Pasig Regional Trial Court ruled Padilla's right for the 45-day reinvestigation of the charges after the motion was filed by Robert Padilla, his counsel and elder brother based on his client's inquest without their counter-affidavit. Luna's defending lawyer Rene Saquisag stressed his client's innocence by stating that the arresting policemen had "planted" the evidence against them.

On May 20, 1998, Judge Esperanza Fabon-Victorino of the Pasig Regional Trial Court convicted and sentenced Padilla to 8 years imprisonment at the New Bilibid Prison in Muntinlupa for illegal possession of firearms and ammunition. He went into hiding after the fact but eventually surrendered on June 2, 1998 accompanied by his younger brother Robin Padilla and fellow actor George Estregan. His lawyers believed he will not go to jail if he surrenders himself before June 4 to file a notice of appeal before the Court of Appeals but the same ruling judge Victorino denied them for Padilla's violation of the conditions for his bail, and for not appearing in court despite due notice. Padilla's fugitive status while he went into hiding shortly before he was sentenced did not help secure his motion for bail.

While in jail, reports said that he slashed his wrists in his cell to attempt suicide.

On February 19, 1999, while serving time in the New Bilibid Prisons and appealing his conviction, he was released on Php 150,000 bail allowed by the Court of Appeals. Again, his mother, Eva Cariño took him home after saying "I will will [sic] make sure that Rommel will not be involved in any trouble while he is out of jail,". Padilla said he wishes to star in films again and dedicate his time for family.

== Filmography ==
=== Film ===
Year	Title	Role
1991	Blue Jeans Gang	
1992	Bad Boy II	
1992	Grease Gun Gang	Engeng
1992	Miss Na Miss Kita (Utol Kong Hoodlum II)	
1993	Makuha Ka sa Tingin (Kung Puwede Lang)	Don Ricardo's Men
1993	Manila Boy	Señor Escudero's henchmen no. 1
1994	Mistah	Romy De Jesus
1994	Col. Billy Bibit, RAM	Col. Billy Bibit
1994	The Untold Story: Vizconde Massacre II – May the Lord Be with Us	Glen
1994	The Four Stooges	Don Pedro Fernando
1995	P're Hanggang sa Huli	
1995	Rodolfo "Boy" Fuentes: Libingan ng Mga Buhay	Rodolfo "Boy" Fuentes
1996	Totoy Golem	Totoy Golem
1997	Sino si Inday Lucing?	Inday Lucing
1997	Dimas at Magdalena	Dimas
1998	Ang Kilabot at si Miss Makipot	Carding
1998	Leopard Hunting	
1999	Kumakasa, Lumalaban	
2000	Kahit Demonyo Itutumba Ko	Sgt. Carlito Nunez
2002	Hari ng Selda: Anak ni Baby Ama 2	Erwin
2002	Huwag Mong Takasan ang Batas	Nelson
2003	You and Me Against the World	Vincent
2012	Shake, Rattle and Roll Fourteen: The Invasion	1st Lt. Bert Garces
2013	10,000 Hours	NBI Agent Aquino
2014	Bonifacio: Ang Unang Pangulo	Padre Mariano Gomez
2015	Manila's Finest	Col. Lazaro
2016	The Escort	Mayor Gibo
2017	Pwera Usog	Jean's father
2017	Bubog	
2018	Badge of Honor: To Serve and Protect	PCol. David Aragon

=== Television ===
Title	Year	Role
2003–2004	Basta't Kasama Kita	Felip "Buhawi" Agda
2005–2007	Krusada Kontra Krimen	
2007–2008	Krusada Kontra Kurapsyon	
2007	Asian Treasures	Leo
2008	Obra Presents: Sanib	Special Guest
2008	Joaquin Bordado	Alfredo
2009	Totoy Bato	Manuel Velarde
2012	Lorenzo's Time	Vincent Castillo
2012	Toda Max	Romy
2012	Sana Ay Ikaw Na Nga	Leopoldo "Leopold" Guerrero
2012	Wansapanataym: Copy Kat	Daddy
2013	Bukas Na Lang Kita Mamahalin	Raul Jimeno
2013	Magkano Ba ang Pag-ibig?	Oscar Ramos
2014	Magpakailanman: Dalawang Kasarian: The Jonalyn Bulado Story	Val
2015	2½ Daddies	Versiculo "Ver" Pastoran
2015	Ipaglaban Mo: Sigaw ng Katarungan	Mr. Solomon
2015–2016	Ningning	Crisanto "Mang Cris" Garcia
2016	Dolce Amore	Cardo
2016	The Greatest Love	Andres Alegre
2016	Ipaglaban Mo: Bugaw	Dolpo
2017	The Better Half	Edgar Villalobos
2017	Wansapanataym: Jasmin's Flower Powers	Waldo
2017–2018	Hanggang Saan	John Joseph "Jojo" Lagrimas
2018	Ipaglaban Mo: Gapang	Ryan
2018–2019	FPJ's Ang Probinsyano	Baldo
2020	A Soldier's Heart	Dante Marasigan
2020	Ipaglaban Mo: Ungol	Lito
2020	Maalaala Mo Kaya: Stethoscope	Romeo Bactol
2020	Maalaala Mo Kaya: Bracelet	Romeo Bactol
2026	Blood vs Duty	P/Dir. Gen. Emil Azuelo
