= List of Baroque churches in the Philippines =

This is a list of Baroque churches in the Philippines.

== List ==
Official name	Image	Current location	Period	Description / Designation
San Agustin Church		Manila	1607	Known as the oldest stone church in the Philippines, the church in 1993 was designated as a UNESCO World Heritage Site. It is one of the 4 churches collectively included in the Baroque Churches of the Philippines.
Vinzons Church		Vinzons, Camarines Norte	1611	A town named Tacboan was established by Franciscan priests in 1581. In 1611, Fr. Juan de Losar, OFM built a church named after Saint Peter. Fr. Losar was the first parish priest of the church. In 1624, the whole town of Tacboan was relocated and it was called Indan where a new church was built with the same patron saint, St. Peter the Apostle. In 1636, the missionaries established a church of Labo combining with Indan. In 1661, the secular clergy started administering the church. After World War II, Indan was renamed Vinzons in honor of Wenceslao Q. Vinzons; a former governor of the Camarines Norte, youngest delegate to the Philippine Constitutional Convention of 1935, and a guerrilla leader martyred by the Japanese during World War II. In 1994, the left and right sides of the church were repaired with the help of the townspeople. In 2011, the 400th foundation anniversary of the Parish of St. Peter the Apostle including the Parish of Saint John the Baptist Church (Daet) in Daet and Parish of Nuestra Señora de Candelaria in Paracale was celebrated. On December 26, 2012, the church was destroyed by a fire. According to its parish priest, Fr. Francisco Regala Jr., the historical artifacts of church were not saved. The Governor of Camarines Norte, Edgardo Tallado, said that the slow response of the fire marshall resulted in the destruction of the whole church except for the concrete walls.
Lubao Church		Lubao, Pampanga	1638	The National Historical Commission of the Philippines designated the church a National Historical Landmark in 1957.
Majayjay Church		Majayjay, Laguna	1649	The National Historical Commission of the Philippines designated the church as a National Historical Landmark in 1993, and the National Museum of the Philippines declared it a National Cultural Treasure.
Abucay Church		Abucay, Bataan	17th century	The National Historical Commission of the Philippines designated the church a National Historical Landmark in 1939.
Paoay Church		Paoay, Ilocos Norte	1710	The church is an interpretation of the European Baroque adapted to the seismic condition of the Philippines through the use of enormous buttresses on the sides and back of the church. The church in 1993 was designated as a UNESCO World Heritage Site. It is one of the 4 churches collectively included in the Baroque Churches of the Philippines.
Maragondon Church		Maragondon, Cavite	1714	The National Historical Commission of the Philippines designated the church as a National Historical Landmark in 2001, and the National Museum of the Philippines declared it a National Cultural Treasure.
Santa Ana Church		Santa Ana, Manila	1725	The National Historical Commission of the Philippines designated the church as a National Historical Landmark in 1936, and the National Museum of the Philippines declared it a National Cultural Treasure.
Loboc Church		Loboc, Bohol	1734	In 2006, the church was one of 5 churches collectively included in the Baroque Churches of the Philippines (Extension), a tentative UNESCO World Heritage Site.
Baclayon Church		Baclayon, Bohol	1737	The National Historical Commission of the Philippines designated the church as a National Historical Landmark in 1994, and the National Museum of the Philippines declared it a National Cultural Treasure in 2010.
Santo Niño Basilica		Cebu City, Cebu	1740	The basilica enshrines the image of Santo Niño, which was presented by Ferdinand Magellan to the consort of Rajah Humabon during their baptism to Roman Catholicism in 1521. The National Museum of the Philippines designated the basilica a National Cultural Treasure in 2021.
Namacpacan Church		Luna, La Union	1741	The church enshrines the Our Lady of Namacpacan. The National Museum of the Philippines declared the church a National Cultural Treasure.
Balayan Church		Balayan, Batangas	1752	The National Historical Commission of the Philippines designated the church as a National Historical Landmark in 1986, and the National Museum of the Philippines declared it a National Cultural Treasure.
Santa Maria Basilica Shrine		Santa Maria, Ilocos Sur	1765	Unlike other town churches in the Philippines, which conform to the Spanish tradition of building them on the central plaza, the Santa Maria Basilica Shrine is situated on a hill surrounded by a defensive wall on all sides like a fortress. The church is reached by climbing a stairway of granite rock. The church in 1993 was designated as a UNESCO World Heritage Site. It is one of the 4 churches collectively included in the Baroque Churches of the Philippines.
Tuguegarao Cathedral		Tuguegarao, Cagayan	1768	The National Historical Commission of the Philippines designated the cathedral a National Historical Landmark in 1982.
Betis Church		Betis, Guagua, Pampanga	1770	The National Museum of the Philippines declared the church a National Cultural Treasure.
Daraga Church		Daraga, Albay	1773	The church's facade is known for its Churrigueresque style, an example of Baroque architecture. The National Historical Commission of the Philippines designated the church as a National Historical Landmark in 2008, and the National Museum of the Philippines declared it a National Cultural Treasure.
Dupax del Sur Church		Dupax del Sur, Nueva Vizcaya	1776	The National Museum of the Philippines declared the church a National Cultural Treasure.
Bacarra Church		Bacarra, Ilocos Norte	1782	The church is famous for its domeless bell tower. The National Historical Commission of the Philippines designated the church as a National Historical Landmark in 1973, and the National Museum of the Philippines declared it a National Cultural Treasure.
Boljoon Church		Boljoon, Cebu	1783	In 2006, the church was one of 5 churches collectively included in the Baroque Churches of the Philippines (Extension), a tentative UNESCO World Heritage Site.
Tumauini Church		Tumauini, Isabela	1783	The church uses an ultra-Baroque style. It uses baked clay both for wall finishes and ornamentation. In 2006, the church was one of 5 churches collectively included in the Baroque Churches of the Philippines (Extension), a tentative UNESCO World Heritage Site.
Tanay Church		Tanay, Rizal	1783	The 14 Stations of the Cross inside the church is considered as one of the most beautiful in Asia. The National Historical Commission of the Philippines designated the church as a National Historical Landmark in 1939, and the National Museum of the Philippines declared it a National Cultural Treasure.
Argao Church		Argao, Cebu	1788	The National Historical Commission of the Philippines designated the church a National Historical Landmark in 2016.
Boac Cathedral		Boac, Marinduque	1792	The National Historical Commission of the Philippines designated the cathedral a National Historical Landmark in 1972.
Miagao Church		Miagao, Iloilo	1797	The church's overall architectural style falls under the Baroque-Romanesque style. Its ochre color is due to the materials used in constructing the church: adobe, egg, coral and limestone. The church's deep foundation and thick stone walls served as protection during Moro invasions and raids in the past. The church in 1993 was designated as a UNESCO World Heritage Site. It is one of the 4 churches collectively included in the Baroque Churches of the Philippines.
Masinloc Church		Masinloc, Zambales	18th century	The National Museum of the Philippines declared the church a National Cultural Treasure.
Romblon Cathedral		Romblon, Romblon	18th century	The National Museum of the Philippines declared the cathedral a National Cultural Treasure.
Vigan Cathedral		Vigan, Ilocos Sur	1800	Predominantly in Earthquake Baroque style with large buttresses on its side. It also has Neo-Gothic, Romanesque, and Chinese-inspired embellishments. The cathedral, along with other places, was included in the Historic Town of Vigan, designated in 1999 as a UNESCO World Heritage Site.
Tayum Church		Tayum, Abra	1803	The National Museum of the Philippines declared the church a National Cultural Treasure.
Loay Church		Loay, Bohol	1822	The National Historical Commission of the Philippines designated the church a National Historical Landmark in 2004.
Dalaguete Church		Dalaguete, Cebu	1825	The National Historical Commission of the Philippines designated the church as a National Historical Landmark in 2004.
Magsingal Church		Magsingal, Ilocos Sur	1827	The National Museum of the Philippines declared the church a National Cultural Treasure.
Minalin Church		Minalin, Pampanga	1834	
Paete Church		Paete, Laguna	1840	The church is known for the large wall paintings on wood panels, which the National Museum of the Philippines declared as a National Cultural Treasure. The National Historical Commission of the Philippines designated the church as a National Historical Landmark in 1939.
Guiuan Church		Guiuan, Eastern Samar	1844	It is the only church in the Philippines with interiors extensively decorated with natural shells. In 2006, the church was one of 5 churches collectively included in the Baroque Churches of the Philippines (Extension), a tentative UNESCO World Heritage Site.
Bacong Church		Bacong, Negros Oriental	1850	The church is famous for its pipe organ from Spain, installed in 1894. The National Museum of the Philippines declared it a National Cultural Treasure.
Calasiao Church		Calasiao, Pangasinan	1852	The National Museum of the Philippines declared the church a National Cultural Treasure.
Calamba Church		Calamba, Laguna	1859	The church where the Philippine national hero Jose Rizal received baptism in 1861. The National Historical Commission of the Philippines designated the church as a National Historical Landmark in 1976.
Loon Church		Loon, Bohol	1864	The National Historical Commission of the Philippines designated the church a National Historical Landmark in 2010, and the National Museum of the Philippines declared it a National Cultural Treasure.
Maasin Cathedral		Maasin, Southern Leyte	1968	The National Historical Commission of the Philippines designated the cathedral a National Historical Landmark in 1983.
San Joaquin Church		San Joaquin, Iloilo	1869	The church has a pediment that depicts the Spanish victory over the Moors in Morocco. The National Historical Commission of the Philippines designated the church as a National Historical Landmark in 1980, and the National Museum of the Philippines declared it a National Cultural Treasure.
Maribojoc Church		Maribojoc, Bohol	1872	The National Historical Commission of the Philippines designated the church as a National Historical Landmark in 2009, and the National Museum of the Philippines declared it a National Cultural Treasure.
Mahatao Church		Mahatao, Batanes	1873	The National Historical Commission of the Philippines designated the church as a National Historical Landmark in 2008, and the National Museum of the Philippines declared it a National Cultural Treasure.
Taal Basilica		Taal, Batangas	1878	The basilica is the largest in the Philippines. The National Historical Commission of the Philippines designated the basilica as a National Historical Landmark in 1972.
Tabaco Church		Tabaco, Albay	1879	The National Historical Commission of the Philippines designated the church as a National Historical Landmark in 1980, and the National Museum of the Philippines declared it a National Cultural Treasure.
Pan-ay Church		Pan-ay, Capiz	1884	The church has the largest bell in Asia. The National Historical Commission of the Philippines designated the church as a National Historical Landmark in 1997, and the National Museum of the Philippines declared it a National Cultural Treasure.
Lazi Church		Lazi, Siquijor	1884	In 2006, the church was one of 5 churches collectively included in the Baroque Churches of the Philippines (Extension), a tentative UNESCO World Heritage Site.
Barasoain Church		Malolos, Bulacan	1888	The church was the seat of the First Philippine Republic, leading to it being depicted in monetary bills in the Philippines. The National Historical Commission of the Philippines designated the church as a National Historical Landmark in 1976.
Quipayo Church		Calabanga, Camarines Sur	1888	The National Historical Commission of the Philippines designated the church a National Historical Landmark in 1979.
Jimenez Church		Jimenez, Misamis Occidental	Late 1880s	The National Museum of the Philippines declared the church a National Cultural Treasure.
Tayabas Basilica		Tayabas, Quezon	1894	The church is one of the most beautiful in the Philippines. The National Historical Commission of the Philippines designated the church as a National Historical Landmark in 1982, and the National Museum of the Philippines declared it a National Cultural Treasure.
Jasaan Church		Jasaan, Misamis Oriental	Late 19th to early 20th century	The National Museum of the Philippines declared the church a National Cultural Treasure.

== See also ==
- Earthquake Baroque
- Baroque Churches of the Philippines (UNESCO World Heritage Site)
- List of Catholic churches in the Philippines
- Church architecture
- Spanish Colonial architecture
  - Churrigueresque
  - Plateresque
