= Maculabo Island =

Island in Camarines Norte, Philippines

Maculabo
- Location in Camarines Norte Location in Luzon Location in Philippines

Geography
- Coordinates: 14°24′3″N 122°48′47″E
- Adjacent to: Philippine Sea

Administration
- Philippines
- Region: Bicol Region
- Province: Camarines Norte
- Municipality: Paracale
- Barangay: Macolabo Island

Demographics
- Population: 860

Maculabo Island or Macolabo Island is an island barangay in the Philippines in the municipality of Paracale, Camarines Norte. The island is part of the Calaguas group of islands while the barangay also includes the uninhabited Samur Island around 7 kilometers (4.3 mi) to the northwest in its jurisdiction. The island serves as a major stop-over going to Tinaga Island where the well-known long beach Mahabang Buhangin is located. The island is about 4 kilometers (2.5 mi) long. Locals reside on parts of the island with farming and fishing as their main source of income.
