= Saint Peter the Apostle Church (Vinzons) =

Roman Catholic church in Camarines Norte, Philippines

Parroquia de San Pedro Apostol
- Saint Peter the Apostle Parish Church
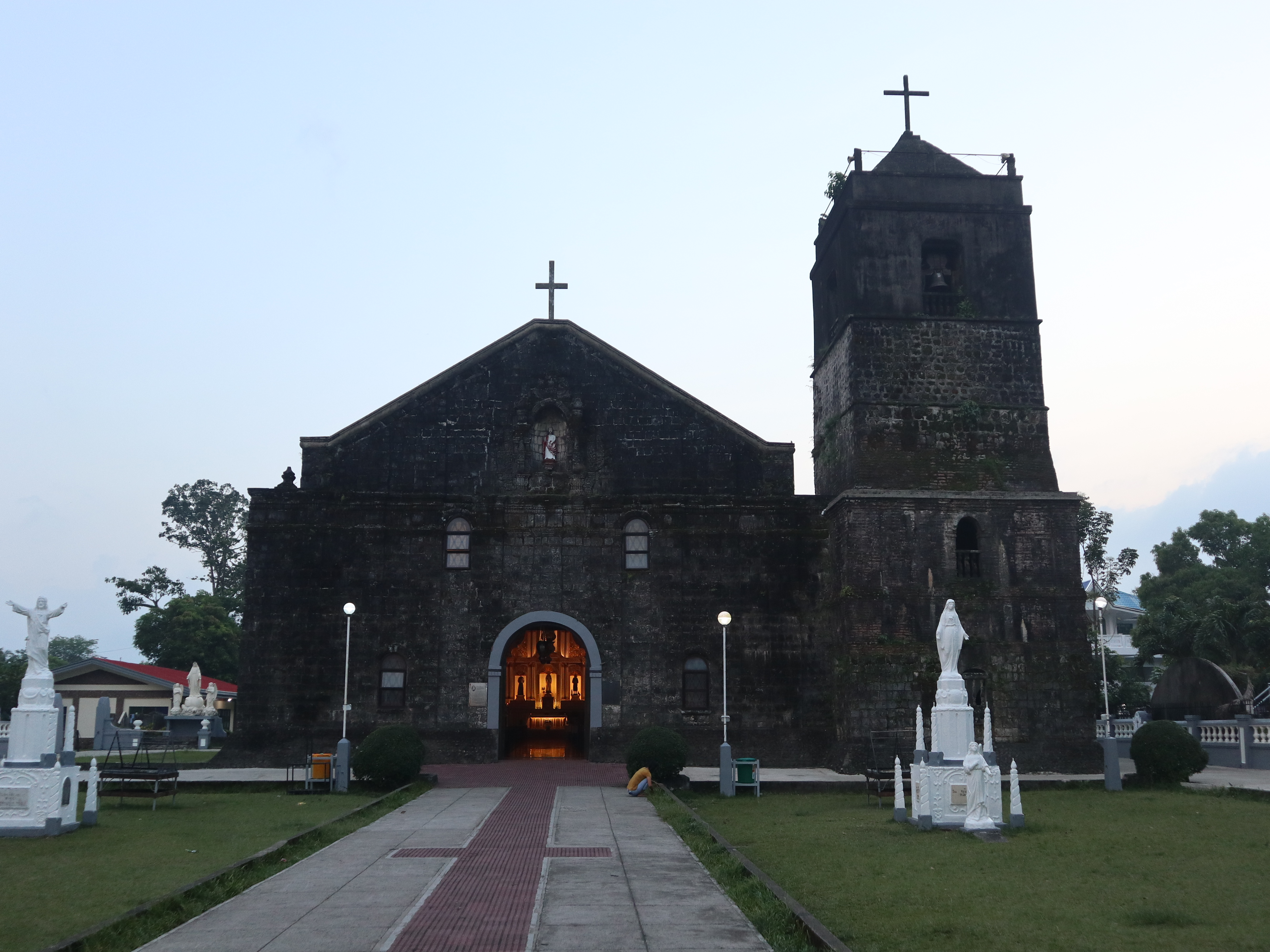
- Church façade in 2023

- Location in Camarines Norte Location in Luzon Location in the Philippines
- 14°10′22″N 122°54′24″E
- Location: Vinzons, Camarines Norte
- Country: Philippines
- Denomination: Roman Catholic

History
- Status: Parish church

Architecture
- Functional status: active
- Architectural type: Church building
- Style: Baroque
- Completed: 1611 (Reconstructed in 2013 completed in 2015)

Administration
- Diocese: Daet

The Parroquia de San Pedro Apostol, also known as Saint Peter the Apostle Church, is a Roman Catholic Church located in the municipality of Vinzons in Camarines Norte, Philippines. It is under the jurisdiction of the Diocese of Daet and is the oldest church in Camarines Norte built by the Franciscan friars in 1611.

== History ==
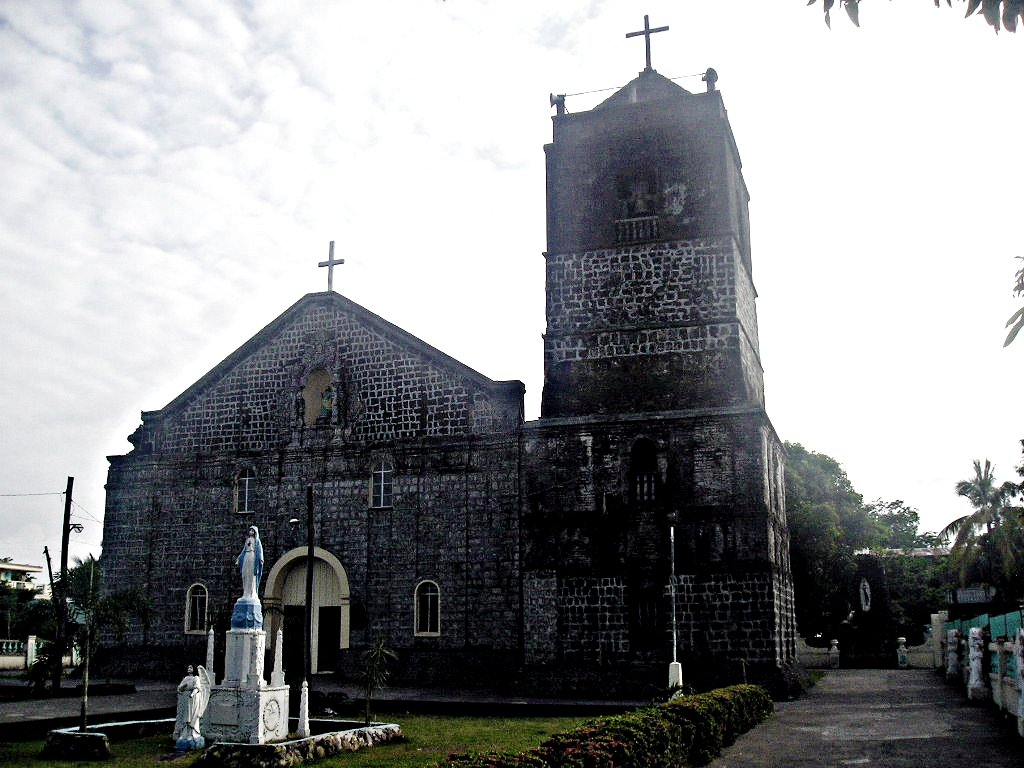
The church on July 6, 2007

A town named Tacboan was established by Franciscan priests in 1581. In 1611, Rev. Fr. Juan de Losar, OFM built a church named after Saint Peter. Losar was the first parish priest of the church. In 1624, the whole town of Tacboan was relocated and it was called Indan where a new church was built with the same patron saint, St. Peter the Apostle. In 1636, the missionaries established a church of Labo combining with Indan. In 1661, the secular clergy started administering the church.

After World War II, Indan was renamed Vinzons in honor of Wenceslao Vinzons; a former governor of the Camarines Norte, youngest delegate to the Philippine Constitutional Convention of 1935, and a guerrilla leader killed by the Japanese during World War II.

In 1994, the left and right sides of the church were repaired with the help of the people in town. In 2011, the 400th foundation anniversary of the Parish of St. Peter the Apostle including the Parish of St. John the Baptist in Daet and Parish of Nuestra Señora de Candelaria in Paracale, Camarines Norte was celebrated.

On December 26, 2012, the church was destroyed by a fire. According to its parish priest, Rev. Fr. Francisco Regala Jr., the historical artifacts of church were not saved. The Governor of Camarines Norte, Edgardo Tallado, said that the slow response of the fire marshall resulted in the destruction of the whole church except for the concrete walls.

=== Reconstruction of the Church ===
Through the efforts of Rev. Fr. Augusto Jesus B. Angeles III, the 400-year-old limestone church was restored in a 15th-century setting. The flooring consists of the same baldozas mosaicos or machuca tiles, specially fired and featuring the same design. Wooden doors and benches are made of yakal, featuring sculpted banyan tree leaves. The windows are handcrafted and fired by Kraut Art Glass with a modern and symmetrical design. Chandeliers and ceiling murals were commissioned pro bono by Hermes Alegre, a visual artist from the Philippines. These works were made possible by the donations of a few families in Vinzons, such as the altar with Italian granite flooring. The church's pulpit was also restored using the wooden materials which survived the fire that gutted it.

The church was inaugurated on June 29, 2015, on the feast of its patron saint, St. Peter the Apostle.

== Architecture ==
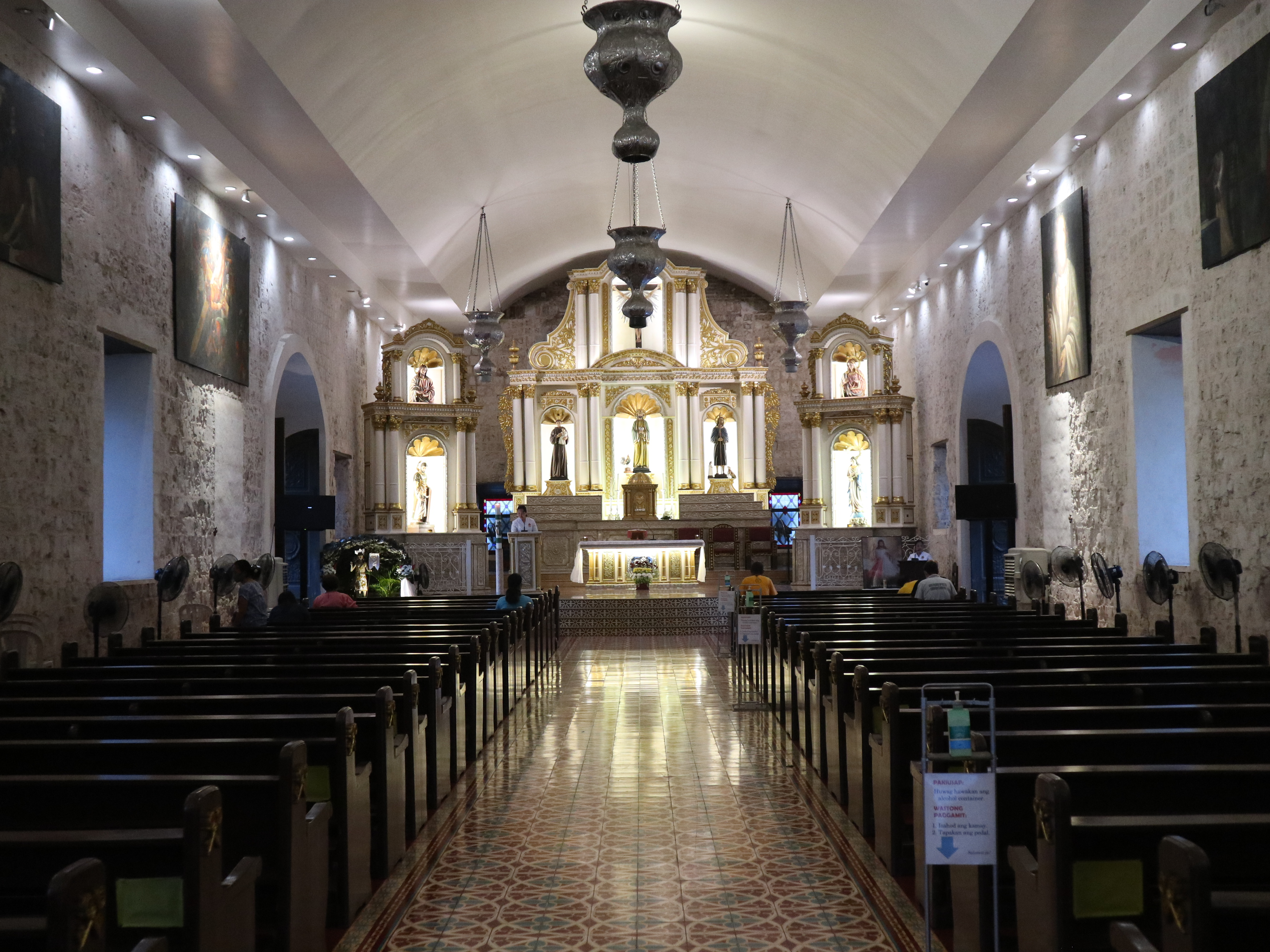
Church interior in 2023

The facade is plain and traditional, with a triangular pediment and a flat wall. There are no horizontal bands to separate the facade into storey(s), though a steam of cornice(s) separate the pediment from the wall. An arched main portal contrasts against the otherwise plain facade, its smoothness stark against the unplastered masonwork of the rest of the facade. The spacious central niche holds the town patron, surrounded by a florid frame. A square bell tower rises to the church's left. It tapers slightly and a peculiar layering indicates different types of masonry used in its construction. Its campanile windows are protected with decorative balustrades and a squat spire is topped with a cross.

== List of Parish priests ==
Name	Years of Pastorship
Rev. Fr. Juan de Losar, O.F.M. †	1611
Rev. Fr. Manuel Isidro de Vera †	1845 - 1864
Rev. Fr. Antonio Peñalosa †	1865 - 1874
Rev. Fr. Avelino Vinzons †	1874 - 1881
Friar Carlos Cabido †	1881
Rev. Fr. Isaac Villareal †	1881 - 1882
Friar Vicente Rojo †	1882 - 1888
Friar Toribio Martinez †	1882 - 1898
Rev. Fr. Marciano Bamba †	1898 - 1913
Rev. Fr. Salomon Balane †	1913 - 1950
Rev. Msgr. Cayetano Iligan †	1950 - 1971
Rev. Fr. Floro Cabrera †	1972 - 1976
Rev. Fr. Juan P. Chavez †	1976 - 1988
Rev. Fr. Domingo Halum †	1988 - 1990
Rev. Msgr. Quirino G. Parcero, H.P. †	1990 - 1998
Rev. Msgr. Jose A. Rodriguez, Jr., H.P. †	1998 - 2002
Rev. Msgr. Reymundo J. Asis, P.C. †	2002 - 2008
Rev. Fr. Francisco P. Regala, Jr. †	2008 - 2013
Rev. Fr. Augusto Jesus B. Angeles, III †	May 2013 - January 2023
Rev. Fr. Milo Jojo M. Caymo †	January 2023 - February 22, 2024
Most Rev. Ronald Anthony P. Timoner, V.G. †	February 22, 2024 - August 1, 2025
Rev. Fr. Jose R. Julian †	2025 - Present

== Attached Priest ==
Name	Years of Pastorship
Rev. Fr. Peter B. Molina †	2018 - 2021
Rev. Msgr. Reymundo J. Asis, P.C. †	2023 - Present

== List of Parochial vicars ==
- Rev. Fr. Quirino G. Parcero † (1962 – 1965)
- Rev. Fr. Efren S. Sanchez † (July 1976 – April 1978)
- Rev. Fr. Ruben Cammayo † (1980s)
- Rev. Fr. Andrei F. Uy † (1996 – 1998)
- Rev. Fr. Rodrigo A. Lazarte † (1998 – 2000s)
- Rev. Fr. Gerardo P. Nemi † (2003 – 2008)
- Rev. Fr. Venancio Rosales † (2005 – 2006)
- Rev. Fr. Luis M. Puno, Jr. † (2008 – 2010s)
- Rev. Fr. Ace D. Baracena † (2013 – 2014)
- Rev. Fr. Rainier M. Abaño † (2014 – 2015)
- Rev. Fr. Donn Corre † (2015 – 2019)
- Rev. Fr. Peter B. Molina † (2019 – 2021)
- Rev. Fr. Michael T. Rañeses † (2017 – January 2023)
- Rev. Fr. Ramiel A. Alvarez † (January 10, 2023 – 2026)
- Rev. Fr. Romeo C. Tamboboy, Jr. † (2026 – present)

== Schedule of services ==
=== Sacraments ===
==== Masses ====
- Monday to Saturday: 6:00am
- Tuesday to Friday: 6:00am and 5:15pm
- First Friday mass:
  - Holy Hour: 5:00am
  - Morning Mass: 5:00am and/or 6:00am
  - Afternoon Mass: 5:15pm
- Saturday: 6:00am and 6:00pm (Anticipated Mass)
- Sunday:
  - Morning: 5:30am and 7:30am
  - Afternoon: 4:00pm (Children's Mass) and 6:00pm

==== Baptism ====
- Saturday & Sunday: 10:30am
- Feast Day: June 29 after 9:30am Mass (Bishop's Mass)

==== Wedding ====
By appointment at the Parish Office

=== Devotions ===
- Angelus prayer: Bell rings at 6:00am, 12:00pm & 6:00pm
- Morning Prayer & Rosary: Monday & Saturday before the 6:00am and 6:00pm Mass
- Sunday Prayer & Rosary (Morning): Before 5:30am & 7:30am mass
- Afternoon Prayer & Rosary:
  - Tuesday to Friday before the 5:15pm Mass
  - Sunday before the 4:00pm & 6:00pm Mass
- Prayer & Rosary Monday to Sunday: 6:00pm

==== First Friday & Saturday mass ====
- First Friday Mass: 5:00am and/or 6:00am
- First Saturday Procession: 5:30am before the 6:00am Mass in honor of St. Peter the Apostle & Poong Jesus Nazareno of Capalonga

==== Novena ====
- St. Peter the Apostle: Every Friday before the 5:15pm or 6:00pm Mass
- Novena Mass in honor of St. Peter the Apostle: June 20–28
- St. John Vianney: Every Saturday before the 6:00pm Mass

==== Feast day Procession ====
- Santo Niño Feast day Procession: Every 3rd Sunday of January
- Nazareno Feast day Procession: January 9
- Feast day Procession of St. Peter: June 28 (Before Feast day)
- Novena Procession of St. Peter: June 20-28
- Peñafrancia Procession: Sunday after September 15
- Marian Procession and Rosary Month:
  - October 1–31: Holy Rosary Hour (6:00pm)
  - October 31: Grand Marian Procession and Parade of Saints
