= Guintinua =

Island in Camarines Norte, Philippines

- Location in Camarines Norte Location in Luzon Location in Philippines

Geography
- Coordinates: 14°25′22″N 122°57′10″E
- Adjacent to: Philippine Sea

Administration
- Philippines
- Region: Bicol Region
- Province: Camarines Norte
- Municipality: Vinzons

Guintinua is one of the two major islands in the Calaguas group. It is located in Vinzons, Camarines Norte, Philippines, and is part of the Barangay Banocboc. The island is the second largest in the Calaguas group, measuring almost 6.5 km (4.0 mi) long.

Since the 2010s, the island has become a tourist destination beyond its traditional local audience, though the increased tourism has been a concern for some. The island was named among summer escapes for travelers in 2018 by the Philippine Daily Inquirer.

== Transportation ==
The only transportation going to the island is by outrigger boat from either Daet, Vinzons or Paracale.
