= Calaguas =

Group of islands in Camarines Norte, Philippines

Calaguas Group of Islands
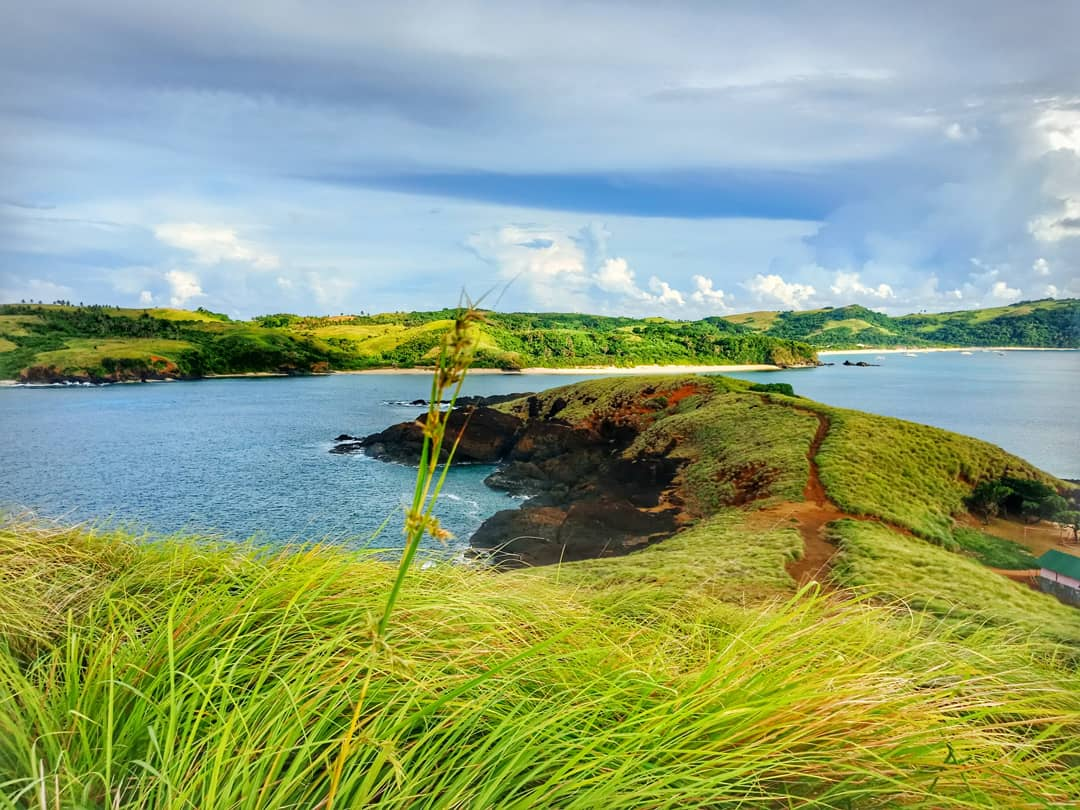
- Calaguas Island

- Location within Camarines Norte Location within Luzon Location within Philippines

Geography
- Coordinates: 14°27′N 122°55′E
- Adjacent to: Philippine Sea
- Major islands: Guintinua Island; Maculabo Island; Tinaga Island

Administration
- Philippines
- Region: Bicol Region
- Province: Camarines Norte
- Municipalities: Paracale; Vinzons

Calaguas, also known as Calaguas Islands, is a group of islands located in the Philippine province of Camarines Norte. It includes the major islands of Tinaga Island and Guintinua Island, the minor Maculabo Island, as well as several other minor. The group of islands is around 200 km away from the capital city of Manila and can be accessed through the ports at Paracale and Daet, Camarines Norte.

Most of the islands are under the administrative jurisdiction of Vinzons, while the minor island of Maculabo is under the jurisdiction of the municipality of Paracale. Recently, the island of Tinaga, where the well-known long beach called Mahabang Buhangin is located, is experiencing an influx of tourists despite the absence of accommodation. Campers and backpackers visit Mahabang Buhangin to experience its powdery white sands.

The recent popularity of Calaguas Island has brought many tourists and travelers, especially during the summer. This has worried some of the natives and locals that increased tourism and the 2018 Boracay closure and redevelopment might lead to the detriment of the island's peace and serenity. This is why the local government has created a program that will hold everyone responsible for taking care of Calaguas Island. Waste management and boat traffic are among the top concerns of the local government.
