= Saint John the Baptist Church (Daet) =

Roman Catholic church in Camarines Norte, Philippines

Parroquia de San Juan Bautista
- Saint John the Baptist Parish Church
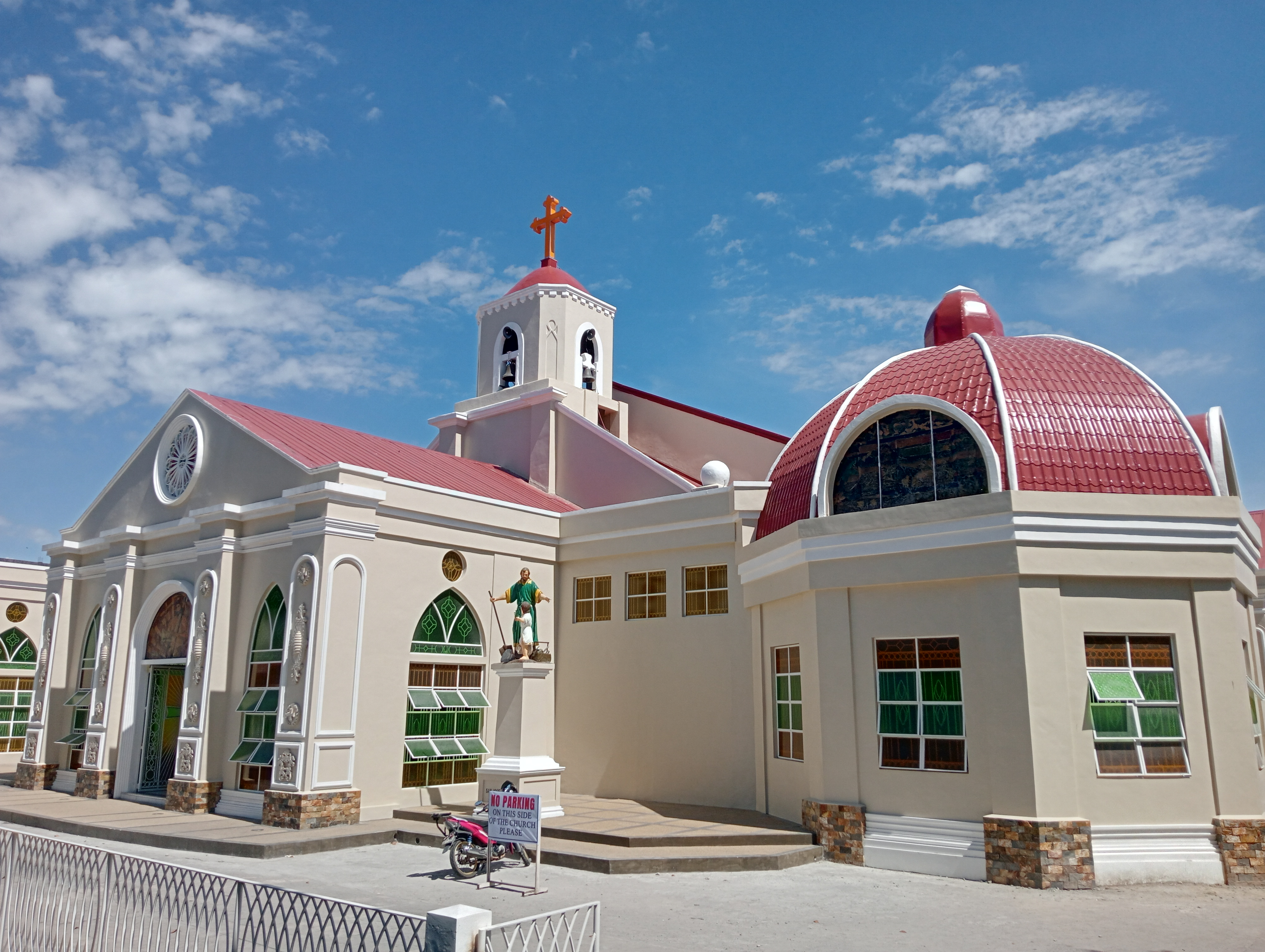
- Church facade in 2024

- Location in Camarines Norte Location in Luzon Location in the Philippines
- 14°06′44″N 122°57′23″E
- Location: Daet, Camarines Norte
- Country: Philippines
- Denomination: Roman Catholic

History
- Status: Parish church

Architecture
- Functional status: active
- Architectural type: Church building
- Style: Baroque, Modern architecture
- Completed: 1611

Administration
- Diocese: Diocese of Daet

The Parroquia de San Juan Bautista, also known as Saint John the Baptist Church, is a Roman Catholic church in Daet, Camarines Norte, Philippines. It is under the jurisdiction of the Diocese of Daet.

== History ==
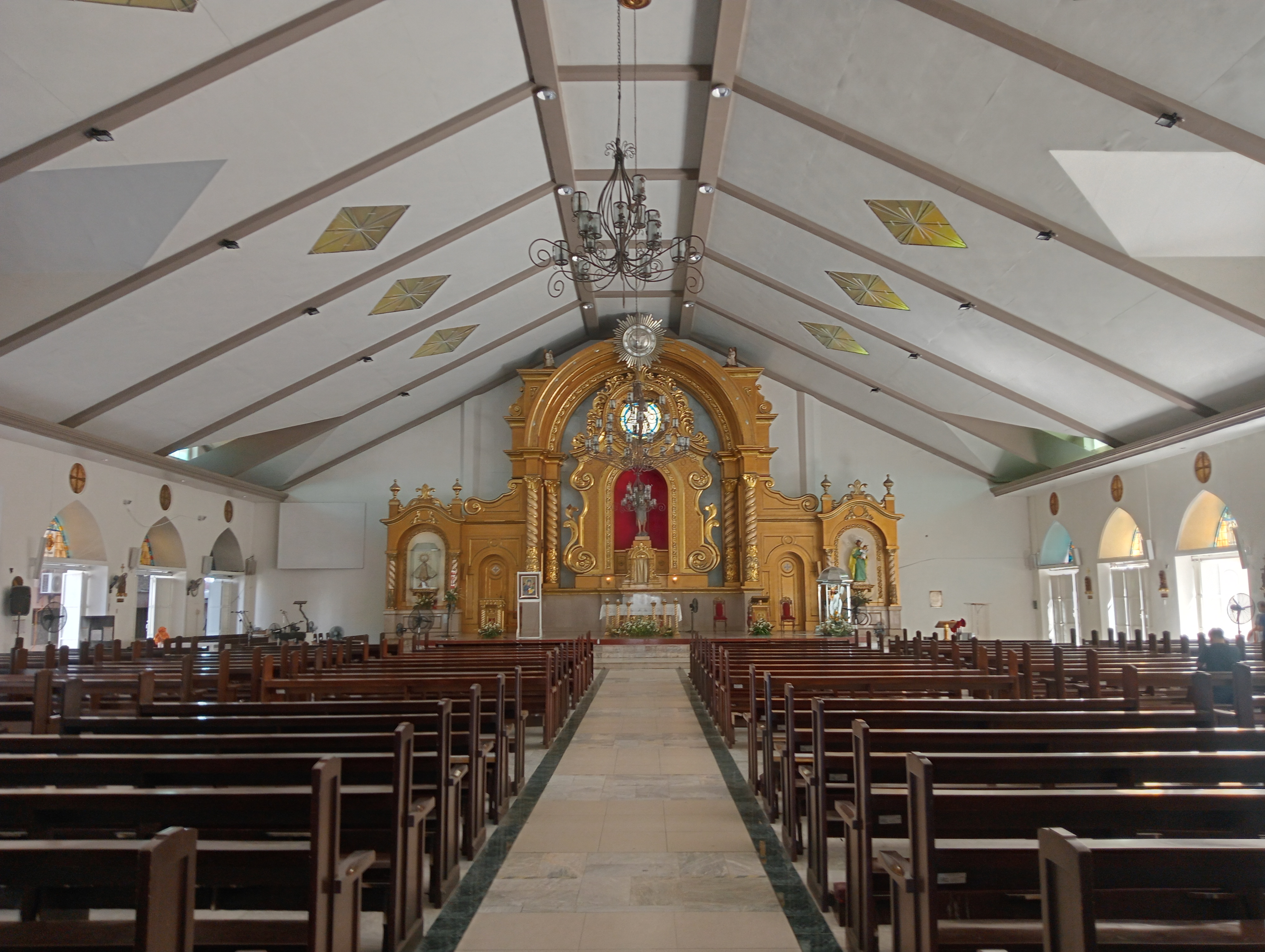
Church interior in 2024

The municipality of Daet was founded by the Franciscan missionaries in 1581. It was later abandoned for some years until 1611, when Rev. Fr. Alonzo de Valdemoro, OFM, was appointed minister (Parish Priest). The first church was dedicated to the glorious precursor, St. John the Baptist, whose feast day is on June 24. Included in its jurisdiction were the visitas of Bactas and of Talisay was founded in 1654.

The Parish of St. John the Baptist presently covers 12 of the 25 barangays of the town. The rectory was constructed during the incumbency of Rev. Msgr. Pedro Espedido, H.P.. In 2011, the Parish Church celebrated the 400 year foundation of this parish church including the Parish of St. Peter the Apostle in Vinzons, and the Parish of Nuestra Señora de Candelaria in Paracale.

== List of Parish priests ==
Name	Years of Pastorship
Fray Eusebio Gomez Platero †	1882 to 1895
Fray Juan Perdiguero †	1895 to 1898
Rev. Fr. Juan Rodriguez †	1898 to 1904
Rev. Fr. Catalino Pimentel †	1904 to 1922
Rev. Fr. Patricio V. Zaño †	1922 to 1929
Rev. Fr. Casimiro Lladoc †	1929 to 1932
Rev. Fr. Martin Alcazar †	1932 to 1936
Rev. Fr. Emiliano Arejola †	1936 to 1948
Rev. Msgr. Antonino O. Reganit, H.P. †	1948 to 1973
Rev. Msgr. Salvador I. Naz, H.P. †	1973 to 1984
Rev. Msgr. Pedro R. Espedido, Jr., H.P. †	1984 to 1990
Most Rev. Benjamin J. Almoneda, D.D. †	1990 to 1991
Rev. Msgr. Luis R. Ayo, H.P.	1991 to 1998
Rev. Msgr. Reymundo J. Asis, P.C.	1998 to 2002; 2008 to 2009
Rev. Msgr. Romeo A. Violeta, P.C.	2002 to 2004
Most Rev. Nestor C. Cariño, D.D.	2004 to 2005
Rev. Msgr. Joselito C. Asis, J.C.D	2005 to 2008
Rev. Msgr. Cezar M. Echano, Jr., P.C.	2010 to 2016
Rev. Fr. Ronald Anthony P. Timoner, V.G.	2017 to 2024
Rev. Fr. Joel C. Villania	2024 to present

== List of Parochial Vicars ==
- Rev. Fr. Efren S. Sanchez (March to July 1976)
- Rev. Msgr. Cezar M. Echano, Jr., P.C. (1984 to 1987)
- Rev. Fr. Edwin J. Abel (1995 to 1997)
- Rev. Fr. Rowel Jose P. Abanto (1996 to 1998; 2008 to 2010)
- Rev. Fr. Jose Vaughn V. Banal (1997 to 1998)
- Rev. Fr. Ramiel A. Alvarez (1998 to 2004)
- Rev. Fr. Vicente V. Dimaterra III (2002 to 2003)
- Rev. Fr. Edwin M. Visda (2003 to 2004)
- Rev. Fr. Jose R. Julian (2004 to 2005)
- Rev. Fr. Andrei F. Uy (2004 to 2007; 2011 to 2016)
- Rev. Fr. Ronald I. Ravago (2004 to 2005)
- Rev. Fr. Juvenson C. Alarcon (2005 to 2006; 2010 to 2013)
- Rev. Fr. Norberto Z. Ochoa (2005 to 2006)
- Rev. Fr. Neil Leo L. Sureta (2006)
- Rev. Fr. Jose Chito M. Estrella (November 2006 to April 2007; 2015 to 2023)
- Rev. Fr. Fidel S. Era, Jr. (2006 to 2008; 2010 to 2011)
- Rev. Fr. Melvin B. Gamelo (February 2007 to 2009)
- Rev. Fr. Ronald Maquiñana (2008 to 2010)
- Rev. Fr. Angelito N. de Torres (March 2009 to 2010)
- Rev. Fr. Alejandro P. Cabonellas (2009 to 2010)
- Rev. Fr. Armando L. Orido (May 2010 to June 2011)
- Rev. Fr. Rodrigo A. Lazarte (2010 to July 2014)
- Rev. Fr. Elmer A. Pandes (June 2011 to June 2013)
- Rev. Fr. Omar C. Oco (March to June 2013; 2014 to 2016)
- Rev. Fr. Rainier M. Abaño (July 2013 to August 2014)
- Rev. Fr. Ace D. Baracena (August 2014 to May 2015)
- Rev. Fr. Gerardo P. Nemi (September 2016 to present)
- Rev. Fr. Angelito N. Olila (October 2022 to May 2024)
- Rev. Fr. Andrew James V. Ibasco (May 2024 to August 2025)
- Rev. Fr. Edmund L. Caldit (June 18, 2026 to present)
- Rev. Fr. Joey Jerome T. Era (June 26, 2026 to present)

== Attached Priest ==
- Rev. Msgr. Quirino G. Parcero, H.P. (1998 to 2001)
- Rev. Fr. Joselito Quiñones (2005 to 2006)
- Rev. Fr. Rogelio Orpiada (2008 to 2009)
- Rev. Fr. Alex C. Chavez (July 2013 to 2022)
- Rev. Fr. Xerox Acosta, NDV (2024, to 2026)

== Schedule of Services ==
=== Sacraments ===
==== Masses ====
- Monday to Friday: 6:00 am, 12:00 nn, 5:15 pm
- Saturday: 6:00 am; 6:00 pm (Anticipated Mass)
- Sunday: 6:30 am, 8:00 am, 9:30 am; 3:00 pm (Children's Mass); 4:30 pm, 6:00 pm

==== Confessions ====
- Monday to Friday

6:30 am - 7:30 am (After Mass) 4:30 pm (Before Mass)

- Saturday

6:30 am - 7:30 am (After Mass)

- Holy Hour

Every First Friday of the Month 6:00 pm (After Mass)

==== Mass and Healing Services ====
- N/A

==== Baptism ====
- Sunday: 10:30 am

==== Wedding ====
By appointment at the Parish Office

=== Devotions ===
- Morning Prayer & Rosary: Monday to Saturday before the 6:00am Mass
- First Saturday Procession: Saturday at 6:15pm
- Holy Hour: First Friday (After 5:15 pm Mass)
- Alliance of the Two Hearts Devotion: First Friday at 8:00pm

==== Novena ====
- St. Martin of Porres: Every Tuesday before the 5:15pm Mass
- Our Mother of Perpetual Help: Every Wednesday before the 6:00am, 12:00nn & 5:15pm Mass
- St. Jude Thaddeus: Every Thursday before the 5:15pm Mass
- Sacred Heart: Every First Friday before the 6:00am Mass
- Our Lady of Peñafrancia: Every Saturday before the 6:00am Mass

==== Adoration of the Blessed Sacrament ====
- Monday to Saturday: 7:00 am to 6:00 pm
