= Augusto P. Hizon House =

Heritage house in Pampanga, Philippines

Coordinates: 15.026796118062416°N 120.69224650816035°E

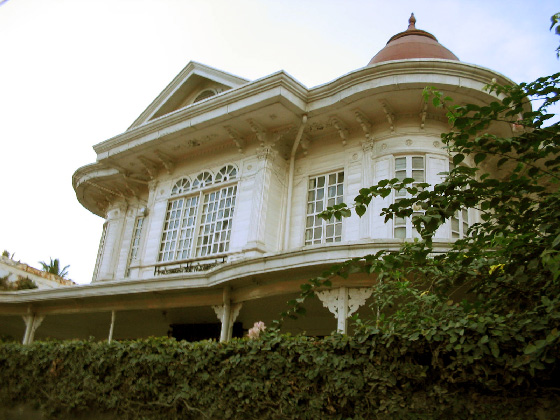
Santos-Hizon House

The Augusto P. Hizon House (built in 1874) is a heritage house in the City of San Fernando in the Pampanga province of the Philippines. The house is located along Consunji Street in the city.

The house exemplifies the American colonial-style architecture. It has a winding staircase leading to the house's portico, with Machuca tiles. The multi-colored tiles, dating back to 1900s, feature a Mediterranean motif.

== History ==
The turn-of-the-century Victorian-style Bahay na Bato house was built by the couple Teodoro Santos, Jr. and Africa Ventura. The house was later purchased by Maria Salome Hizon, a nurse of the Pampanga Chapter of the Philippine Red Cross during the Philippine Revolution. The property was acquired by her brother Ramon Hizon and is currently owned by the heirs of his son Augusto Hizon. It became a Heritage House in 2010.

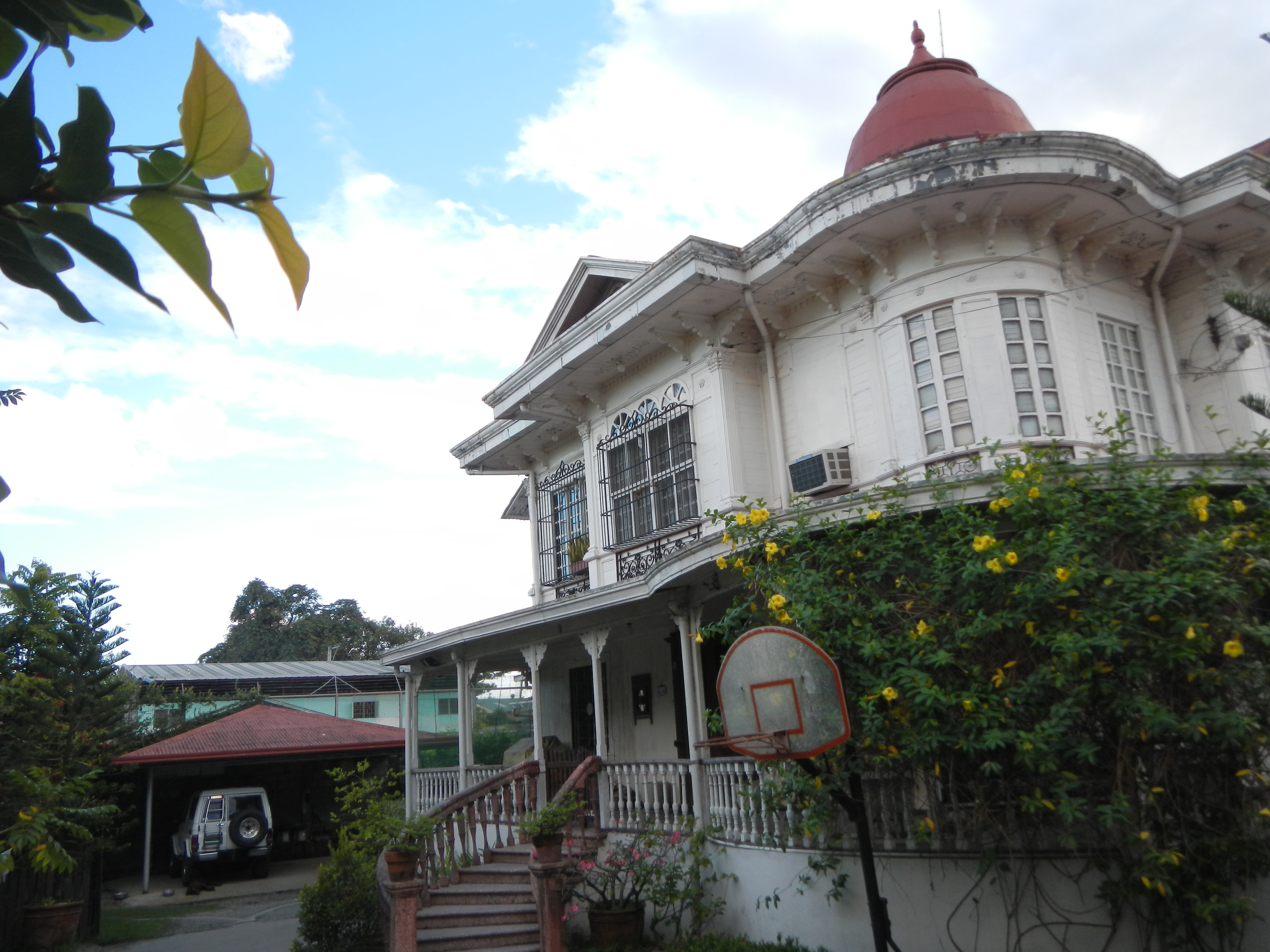
Façade of the House

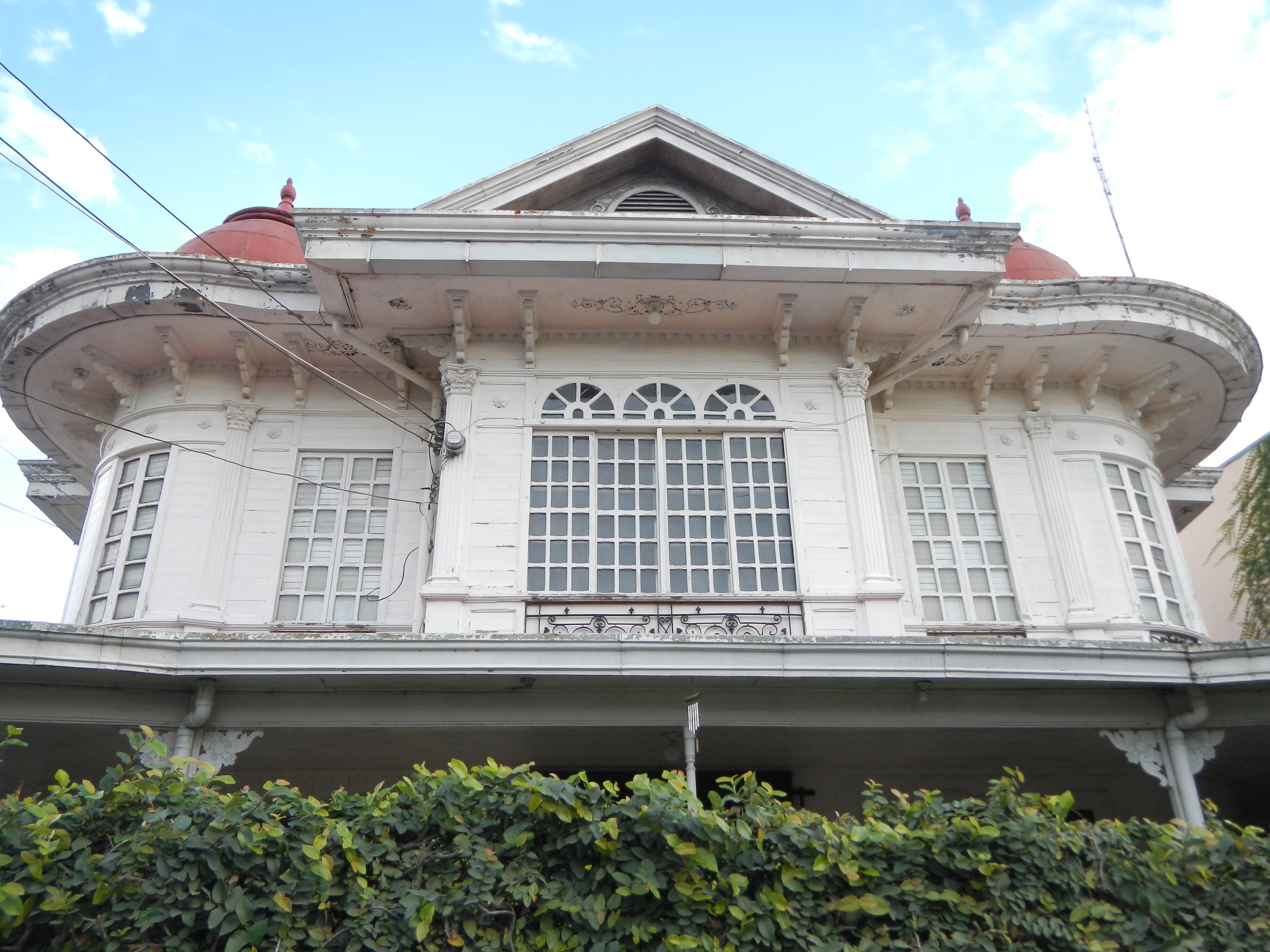
Front of the house

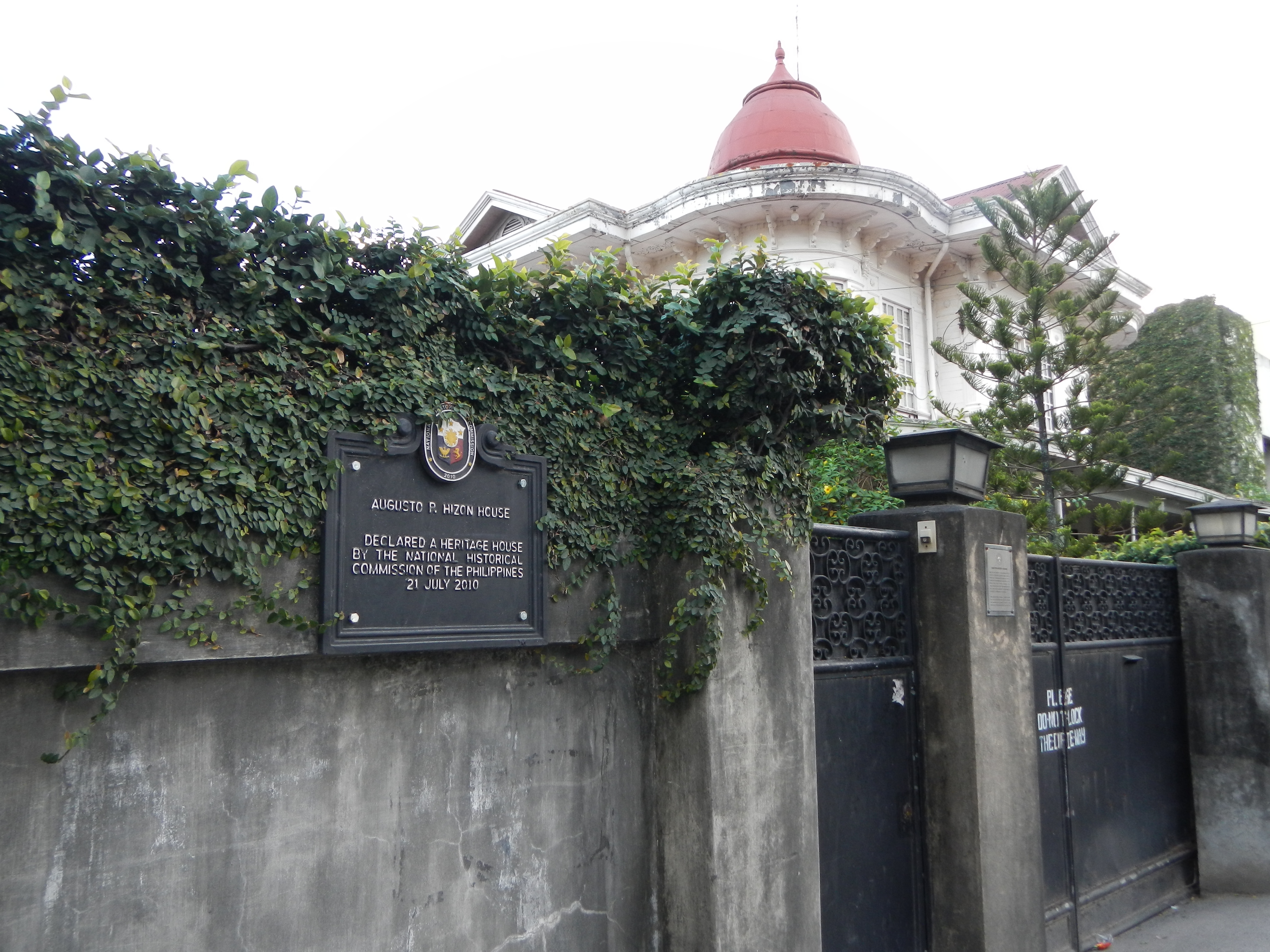
Fence and house
