= Tinaga Island =

Island in Camarines Norte, Philippines

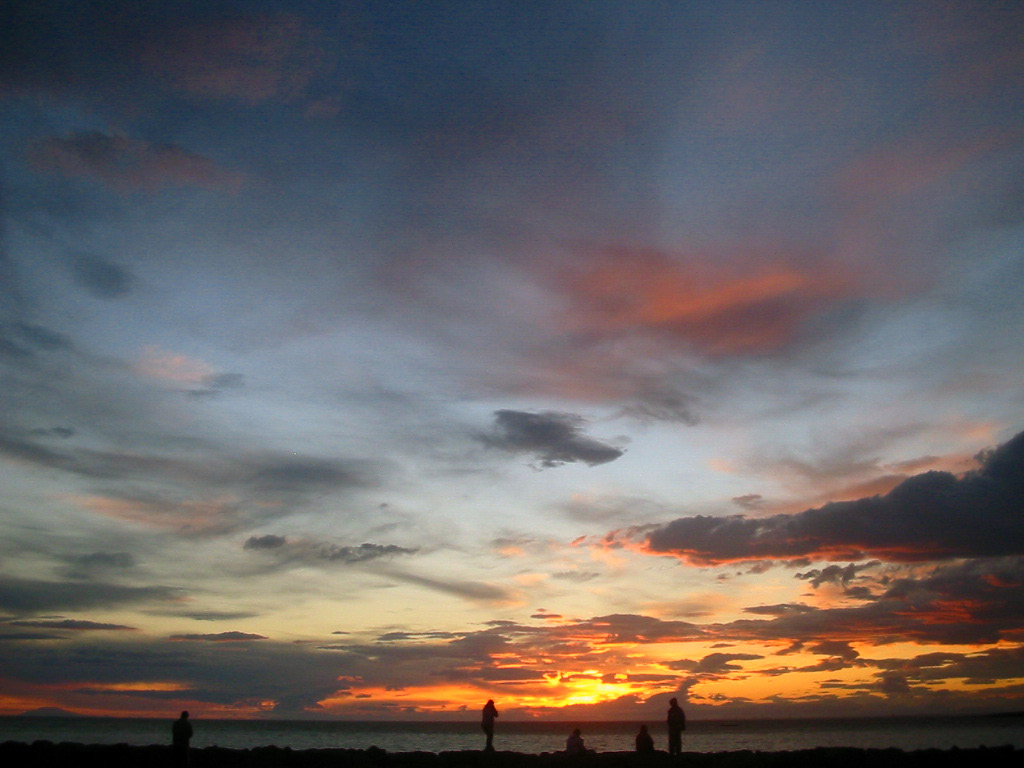
- View from Tinaga beach at sunset

- Location within Camarines Norte Location within Luzon Location within Philippines

Geography
- Coordinates: 14°28′8″N 122°55′50″E
- Archipelago: Calaguas Group of Islands
- Adjacent to: Philippine Sea

Administration
- Philippines
- Region: Bicol Region
- Province: Camarines Norte
- Municipality: Vinzons

Additional information

Tinaga is an island located in the municipality of Vinzons, Camarines Norte in the Philippines. It is one of the two major islands in the Calaguas Group of Islands, about eight kilometers long. Tinaga island is famous for its long white sand beach called Mahabang Buhangin, which literally means "long beach". The beach is becoming popular among backpackers and campers from Manila and elsewhere. Tinaga Island was voted by one of the world's leading accounting firms, PWC, as #1 in their top ten up and coming tourist destinations in their Philippines gems report. Tinaga Island Resorts Inc. recently launched the first ever security token (STO) offering of prime beach front land on Mahabang Buhangin (Long beach).

== Beaches of Tinaga Island ==
- Mahabang Buhangin (Long beach) is the most popular beach to campers and backpackers at Tinaga Island. The beach offers powdery white sands comparable to that of Boracay island in Malay, Aklan.

== Transportation ==
The island is accessible only by outrigger boat from Daet, Vinzons or Paracale. The island is less developed in terms of road infrastructure, so walking is common among local people. A wharf is located at the center in the village of Mangcawayan.
