= Narciso J. Alegre =

Filipino civil liberties advocate

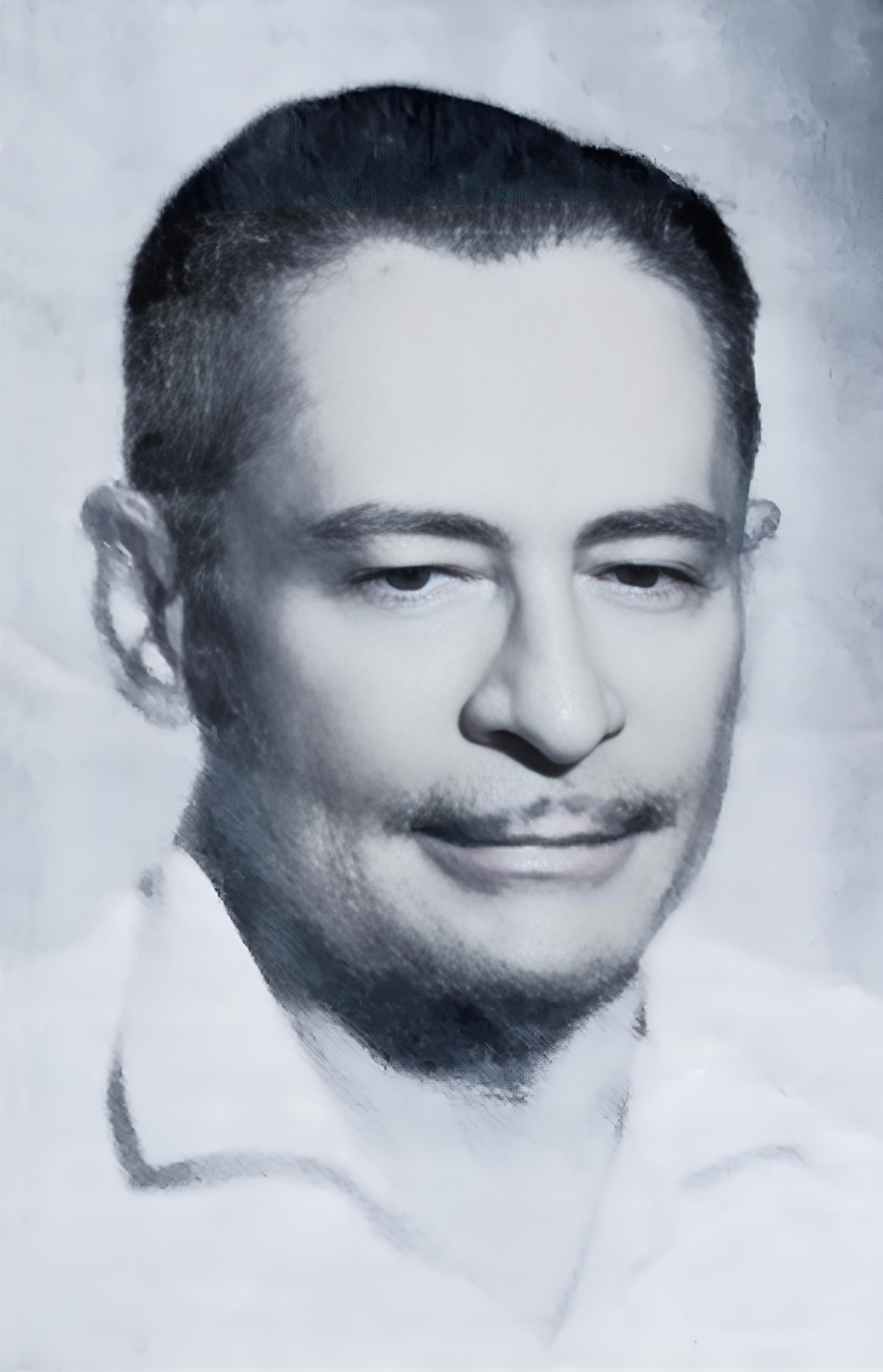
- Born: Narciso Joseph Alegre y Sargent; April 14, 1911; Casiguran, Sorsogon, Philippine Islands
- Died: October 17, 1980 (aged 69); Manila, Philippines
- Resting place: National Shrine of Our Lady of the Abandoned, Santa Ana, Manila
- Education: Real Colegio de las Escuelas Pías de Sarriá University of Barcelona Peekskill Military Academy
- Occupation: businessman
- Years active: 1945-1980
- Known for: Civil liberties advocacy
- Spouse(s): Milagros Reyes; Irene Williams; Teodora Hernaez
- Children: 4 (including Johnny)
- Parents: Juan B. Alegre (father); Amanda ("Aimee") Sargent (mother)
- Relatives: Narciso Alegre y Pellicer (grandfather) Ramona Levantino y Lascano (grandmother)

Narciso Joseph Alegre y Sargent (April 4, 1911 – October 17, 1980) was a Filipino civil liberties advocate, a founder of Young Philippines, and organizing member of the Civil Liberties Union of the Philippines.

== Biography ==
Narciso J. Alegre was born on April 4, 1911, in Casiguran in the province of Sorsogon in the Bicol Peninsula. In 1945, he moved his residence permanently to Manila to pursue his advocacies and entrepreneurial activities.

His father, the late Senator Juan B. Alegre, was at one time the biggest abaca planter and coconut plantation owner of the Philippines with his holdings extending from Sorsogon to the inland of Masbate, off the coast of southern Luzon and cattle ranches covering the island of Ticao, Masbate province.

At the young age of 7, Alegre was sent to Barcelona, Spain to study at the Real Colegio de las Escuelas Pías de Sarriá. He stayed in Barcelona as a student up to the age of 18 when he obtained his Bachillerato from the University of Barcelona. He learned to be a cellist and played the violoncello for the Red Cross and for other charitable institutions. In 1929 he was enrolled at the Peekskill Military Academy in Peekskill, New York where he took up military science.

Upon his return to the Philippines Narciso J. Alegre was placed in charge of the family hacienda in the provinces of Sorsogon and Masbate. Upon his father's death in 1931 Alegre was urged by Sergio Osmeña to campaign for the acceptance of the Hare-Hawes-Cutting Independence Act. It was during this stage of his career that he got himself involved interchangeably in politics as well as business.

== Political and civic activities ==
Alegre got himself introduced to politics in 1932 as a result of the organization of a youth party composed of men and women of liberal tendencies. This became a nationwide political organization known as Young Philippines, with his fellow Bicolano Wenceslao Vinzons as president, and Alegre as vice-president. The party's roster included Arturo Tolentino, Lorenzo Sumulong, Diosdado Macapagal, Domocao Alonto, Jose Laurel Jr., and many others who all became prominent figures in Philippine politics.

In 1938, Alegre organized the Civil Liberties Union of the Philippines (CLU) and was elected by acclamation as its first president. Then in 1941, Alegre ran for congress in the 2nd district of Sorsogon before the unforeseen occurrence of World War II. The CLU went underground during the Japanese occupation with three martyrs; Dr. Ramon de Santos, Atty. Antonio Bautista, and writer Rafael Roces, Jr. At the end of the war and the liberation of the Philippines, Alegre worked for the U.S. Army as chief appraiser to determine the value of war damage of property to be assumed by the U.S. government.

== Entrepreneurship ==
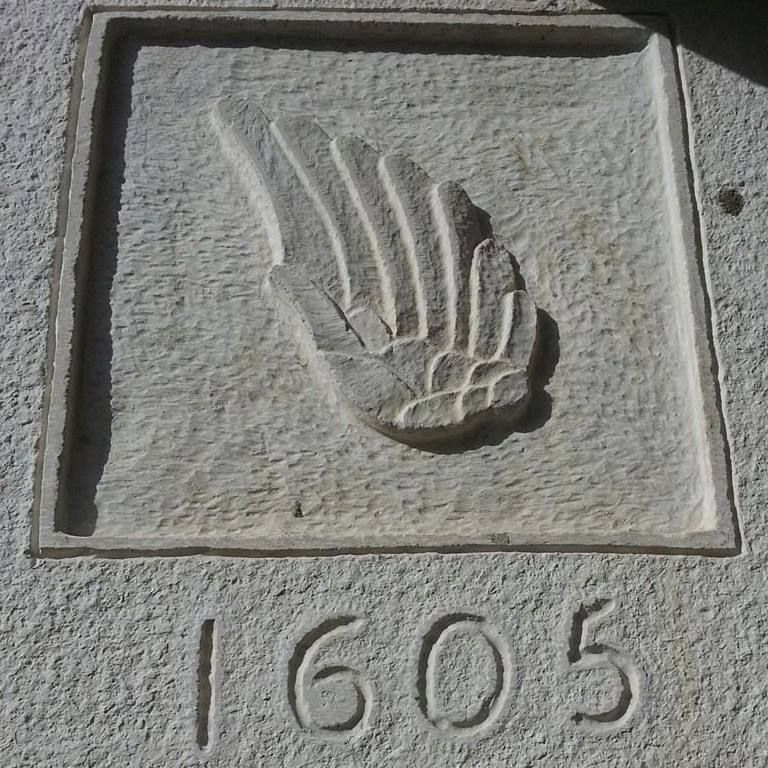
Historical emblem of the Alegre family of Villarroya de los Pinares

In his later years Alegre embarked on activities to serve his country outside of politics. In 1947, Col. Andres Soriano offered Alegre to join the Philippine Broadcasting Service which later was to merge with the Manila Broadcasting Company. Being a Bicolano, he was a member of the Bicol Association and the Escolta Walking Corp., a breakfast club of Manila's business leaders. In 1953, he organized his own firm, Sargent's Philippines, which engaged in farm products and pesticides, and was granted a diploma as an entomologist by the Division of Entomology of the Philippine Department of Agriculture. Alegre pursued his business activities until his passing in 1980, and was survived by his four children.
