= Wenceslao Vinzons =

Filipino politician and activist

The Honorable Wenceslao Q. Vinzons
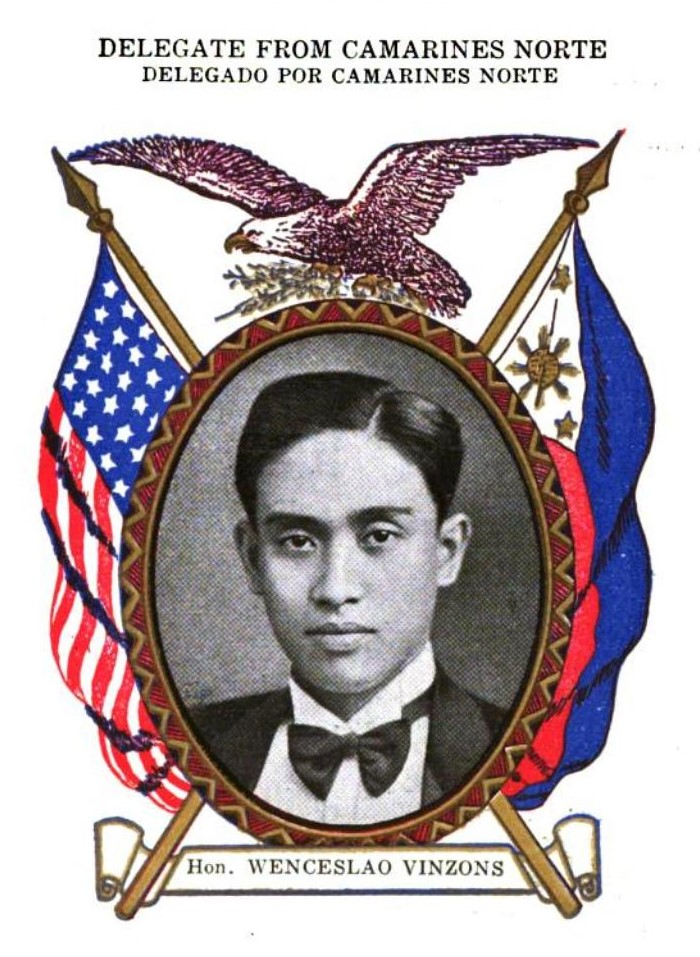
- Vinzons as a delegate to the Philippine Constitutional Convention, published by Benipayo Press (c. 1935)

Member of the Philippine House of Representatives from Camarines Norte's Lone District
- Died before taking office

Governor of Camarines Norte
- In office December 30, 1940 – December 30, 1941
- Preceded by: Miguel Lukban
- Succeeded by: Basilio Bautista Sr.

Member of the 1934 Philippine Constitutional Convention from Camarines Norte
- In office July 10, 1934 – November 15, 1935

Personal details
- Born: Wenceslao Quinito Vinzons; September 28, 1910 Indan, Camarines Norte, Philippine Islands
- Died: July 15, 1942 (aged 31) Daet, Camarines Norte, Philippines
- Party: Young Philippines
- Spouse: Liwayway Custodio Gonzales
- Children: 5
- Parent(s): Gabino Vinzons (father); Engracia Quinito (mother)
- Relatives: Justin "Bintao" Vinzons (grandson); Wenceslao Vinzons, III (grandson); Wenceslao Vinzons, Jr. (son); Liwayway Vinzons-Chato (cousin)
- Education: University of the Philippines; University of the Philippines College of Law (LLB)
- Occupation: Politician
- Profession: Lawyer, activist
- Known for: "Father of Student Activism in the Philippines"

Wenceslao "Bintao" Quinito Vinzons Sr. (September 28, 1910 – July 15, 1942) was a Filipino patriot and leader of the Philippine armed resistance against the Japanese invasion in World War II. He was the youngest delegate to the 1935 Philippine Constitutional Convention. For leading demonstrations as a student leader, he was dubbed the "Father of Student Activism in the Philippines" when he, along with Narciso J. Alegre and future Senator and Vice President Arturo Tolentino, founded the Young Philippines Party.

Vinzons was among the first Filipinos to organize a guerrilla movement at the onset of the Japanese invasion of the Philippines in 1941. In the course of the resistance, he was captured and executed by the occupying Japanese military.

== Early life and education ==
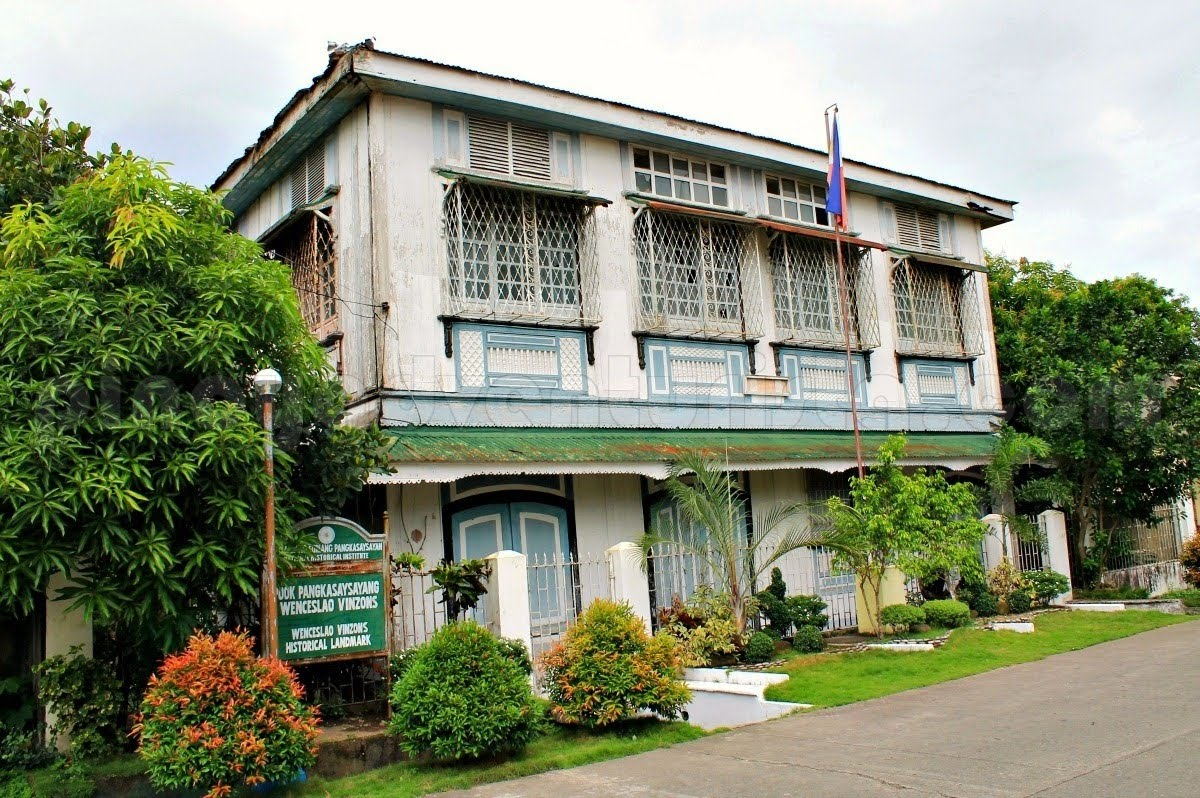
Ancestral house of the Vinzons family in Vinzons, Camarines Norte

Vinzons was born in the town of Indan, Camarines Norte to Gavino Vinzons y Venida and Engracia Quinito y Elep. His paternal grandparents were Serafín Vinzons, a Chinese Filipino, and Baldomera Venida. His maternal grandparents were Rosalío Quinito and Cipriana Elep. He was baptized on October 5, 1910, by Fr. Marciano Bamba at the Saint Peter the Apostle Church in the same town and his godfather was Ángel Anz. He graduated valedictorian from his local high school, and proceeded to study at the University of the Philippines in Manila.

While at the university, Vinzons gained fame as a student leader. A fellow of the Upsilon Sigma Phi fraternity, Vinzons would be elected president of the student council and editor-in-chief of the Philippine Collegian. He was also known for delivering an oratorical address entitled Malaysia Irredenta, where he advocated the unification of Southeast Asian nations with a common Malay origin. The piece won him the Manuel L. Quezon Gold Medal for Excellence.

Vinzons obtained his law degree from the University of the Philippines College of Law in 1932, and placed third in the bar examinations the following year.

== Political career ==
After graduation, Vinzons, along with Narciso J. Alegre and Arturo Tolentino (a future senator and Marcos-era unofficial vice president) founded a political party, Young Philippines, which advocated the granting of Philippine independence from American rule.

After the passage in 1934 of the Tydings–McDuffie Act which laid the groundwork for independence, Vinzons successfully sought election that same year as a delegate, together with Atty. Baldomero M. Lapak, to represent Camarines Norte in the 1934 Constitutional Convention. As a member of the convention, he was instrumental in prescribing Tagalog as an official language of the Philippines. At 24, he was the youngest delegate, and the youngest signer of the 1935 Constitution.

During the 1935 presidential elections, Vinzons actively campaigned for the presidential bid of Emilio Aguinaldo, former President of the First Philippine Republic, the main challenger to then-Senate President Manuel L. Quezon. Vinzons' efforts helped Aguinaldo carry Camarines even though Quezon won the presidency. Following Aguinaldo's defeat, Vinzons put on hold his political career, opting instead to become the president of a mining corporation based in his home province.

Vinzons resumed political life in 1940, when he was elected governor of Camarines Norte. The following year, he successfully ran for election to the House of Representatives, representing the lone district of Camarines Norte. However, his service in the legislature was delayed by the Japanese invasion of the Philippines in December 1941.

== Guerrilla activities and execution ==
Within days following the arrival of the Japanese occupation forces in the Philippines, Vinzons began to organize armed resistance in Bicol against the invading army, which had reached the region on December 12, 1941. He commandeered the rice warehouses in Camarines Norte, and ordered the confiscation of explosives used in the province's gold mines for use against the Japanese forces.

By December 18, 1941, he would lead a raid against a troop of Japanese soldiers in Basud, Camarines Norte. His guerrilla recruits soon grew to around 2,800 strong, and in May 1942, Vinzons would lead these forces to successfully liberate the provincial capital of Daet. It is said that between December 1941 and May 1942, Vinzons' troops, armed with poisoned arrows among other weapons, were able to kill around 3,000 Japanese soldiers. Henceforth, the capture of Vinzons became a prime objective of the Japanese.

Through the betrayal of a renegade guerrilla-turned-informant, Vinzons was captured by the Japanese military together with his father on July 8, 1942. He refused to pledge allegiance to his captors, and was brought to a garrison in Daet. It was there, on July 15, 1942, that Vinzons was bayoneted to death after refusing one final entreaty to cooperate with the Japanese forces. Shortly thereafter, his father, wife, sister and two of his children were also executed by the Japanese.

== Legacy ==
Vinzons is hailed as the "Father of Student Activism in the Philippines".

Vinzons' hometown of Indan was renamed Vinzons, in his memory, as was an elementary school in Manila. The student activity center of the University of the Philippines campus in Diliman was named Vinzons Hall in 1959. Vinzons Hall also houses the offices of the Philippine Collegian. Former Senator Richard Gordon, an admirer of Vinzons, commissioned sculptor Juan Sajid Imao for a bust in his honor at Vinzons Hall as part of rehabilitation efforts by the UP Diliman University Student Council in 2009.

Several of Vinzons' relatives embarked on political careers. Fernando Vinzons Pajarillo was related to Wenceslao and had been elected congressman and governor, for many terms. Wenceslao's son was a one-time governor. His daughter Rannie Vinzons-Gaite was once member of the Provincial Council.

The former lone legislative district of Camarines Norte was last served by a descendant, former Bureau of Internal Revenue Commissioner and former Representative Liwayway Vinzons-Chato.

A three-act musical on Vinzon's life, entitled "Bintao", was staged at the University of the Cordilleras in January 2008. For its centennial anniversary in November 2018, the Upsilon Sigma Phi also staged "Bintao" under the direction of Tony Mabesa and Alexander Cortez.

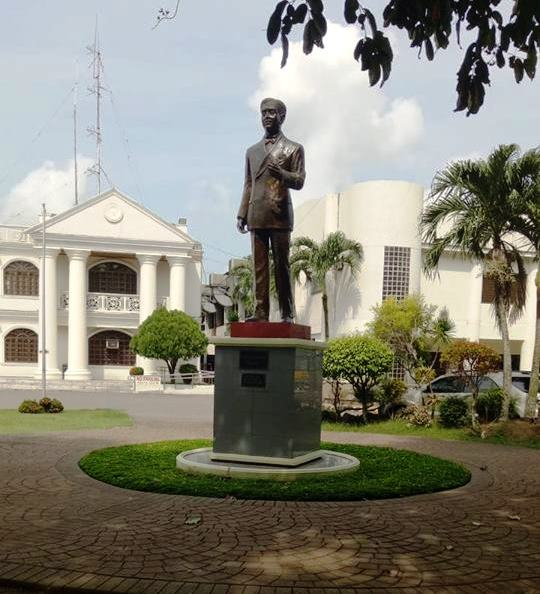
Vinzons monument in front of the provincial capitol of Camarines Norte

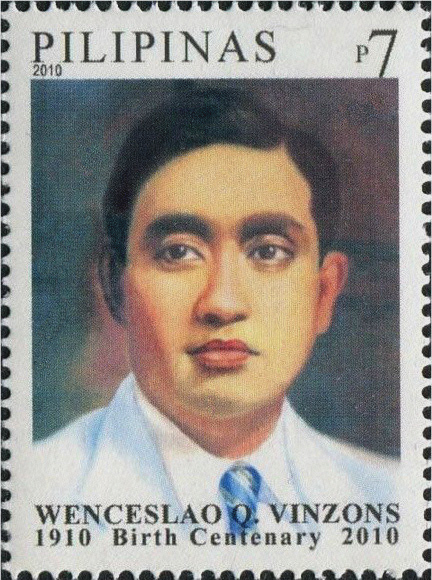
Vinzons on a 2010 stamp of the Philippines

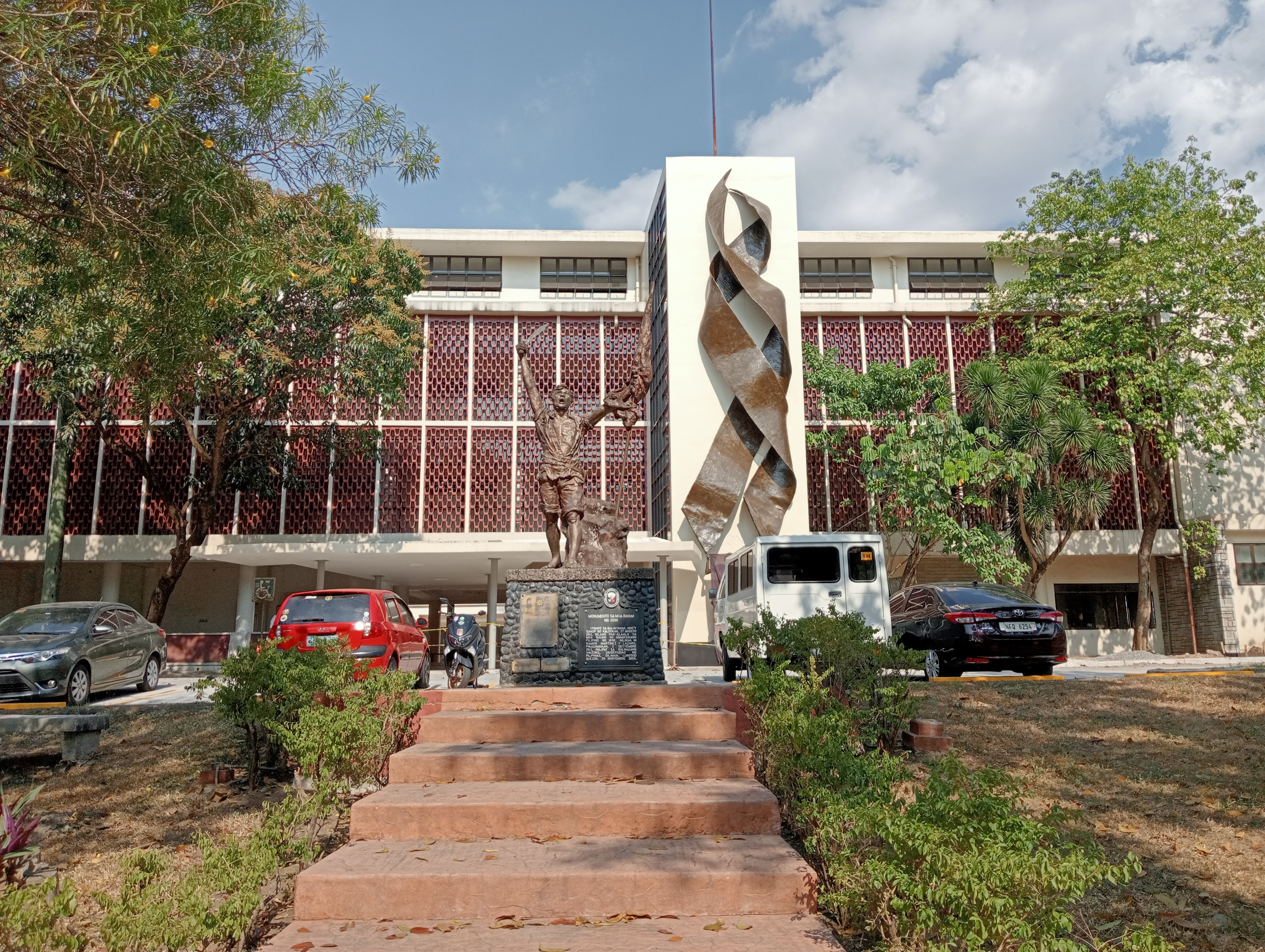
Vinzons Hall at the University of the Philippines Diliman
