= Machuca Tile =

Manufacturer in the Philippines

Machuca Tile Inc., originally known as Mosaicos Machuca, is a tile manufacturer in the Philippines, said to be the oldest in the business, with a history dating back to the early 1900s.

Baldozas Mosaicos was the term used to describe the Mediterranean cement tiles manufactured by the company. Today they are commonly referred to as Machuca tiles, after Don Jose Machuca y Romero (known as Don Pepe), the son and heir of the renowned producer of the first Baldozas Mosaicos in the Philippines.

== History ==
During the early 1900s, Don Jose Machuca y Romero was the foremost producer of Mediterranean tiles in the Philippines. His son, Don Pepe, an Audencia, established Mosaicos Machuca in an ancestral house located on Calle Tanduay in San Miguel, Manila, with the tile factory itself situated beside the Pasig River. The company pioneered the implementation of both wet and dry processes for the manufacture of Mediterranean-designed cement tiles in the Philippines.

Presently, Machuca Tiles Inc. is under the management of Architect Luis P. Machuca Jr., a fourth-generation member of the Machuca family.

== Location ==
In 1993, the Machuca Tile Inc. showroom was relocated to its current address on the ground floor of J y J Condominium, #867 General Solano Street, San Miguel, Manila. Meanwhile, their factory is situated at Lot 17 Marian Park, Road I, East Service Road, South Superhighway, Parañaque.

== Machuca Tiles ==
Machuca Tiles Inc. employs a traditional tile-making method that does not involve baking. They also utilize Lansco powder imported from Spain to achieve a traditional earth-tone color palette. The tiles exhibit a rustic appearance characterized by intricate border motifs and muted colors, showcasing hand-brushed quality and sophisticated palettes.

The standard size of the tiles is 8 inches by 8 inches (200 mm by 200 mm).

The tiles can be designed in three different ways:

- Continuous ribbon-like bands
- Enclosed spaces (panels)
- Unlimited flat patterns

== Projects ==
=== Religious and institutional ===
- San Vicente de Paul by Andres Luna de San Pedro
- San Sebastian Church Sacristy
- San Beda Church
- Colegio San Agustin

=== Commercial ===
- Alabang Town Center
- Shangri-La Mactan Island Resort
- Cabalen Chain of Restaurants
- Hacienda Luisita
- Jai Alai
- Gingersnaps stores
- O Banh mi Vietnamese Sandwich Restaurant (Gateway Cubao)
- The Pavilion Restaurant, Alegre Beach Resort, Cebu - a collaboration between Architect Augusto Villalon and Interior designer Josephine Labrador Hermano

=== Residential ===
- Atelier of Patis Tesoro
- Ancestral residence of former President Jose Laurel
- Residence of former Cultural Center of the Philippines Artistic Director, Nicanor Tiongson
- Residence of Lulu Tan Gan, a fashion designer
