= Vinzons =

Municipality in Camarines Norte, Philippines

Vinzons Tacboan & Indan
- Municipality
- Municipality of Vinzons
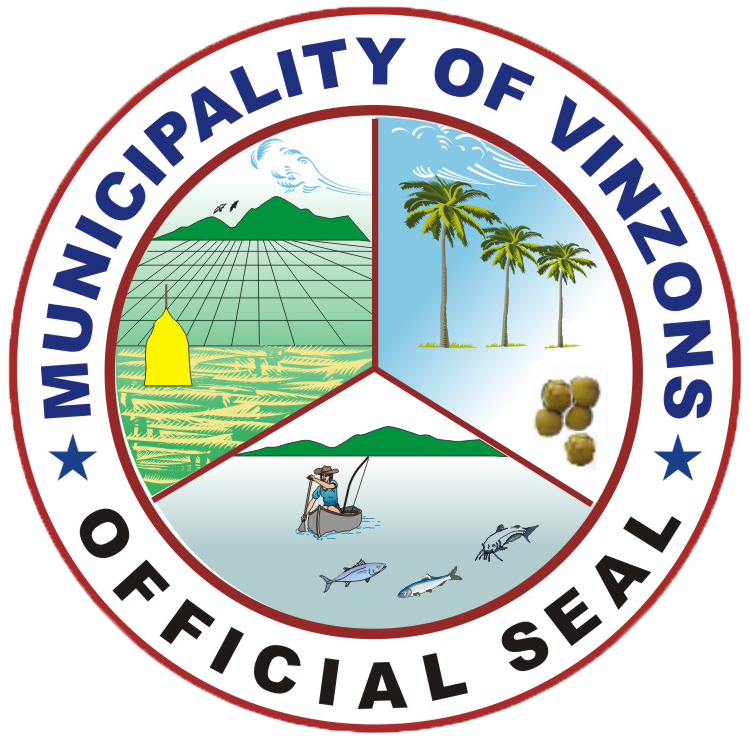
- Flag Seal
- Nickname: Eco-Heritage town
- Motto: Pasiyo sa Vinzons
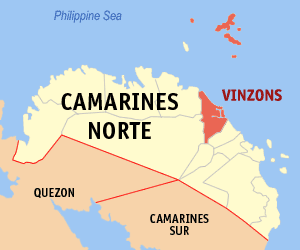
- Map of Camarines Norte with Vinzons highlighted
- Interactive map of Vinzons
- Location within the Philippines
- Coordinates: 14°10′26″N 122°54′29″E
- Country: Philippines
- Region: Bicol Region
- Province: Camarines Norte
- District: 2nd district
- Founded: 1581
- Named for: Wenceslao Q. Vinzons
- Barangays: 19 (see Barangays)

Government
  - Type: Sangguniang Bayan
  - Mayor: Agnes D. Ang
  - Vice Mayor: Ernesto V. Valeros
  - Representative: Rosemarie C. Panotes
  - Municipal Council: Members: Ligaya H. Heraldo; Justin Vinzons; Jonna Valeros; Niel Obusan; Gilbert B. Adorino; Nestor A. Pajarillo; Manuel D. Obusan; Jay Pimentel
  - Electorate: 30,004 voters (2025)

Area
  - Total: 141.43 km^{2} (54.61 sq mi)
- Elevation: 15 m (49 ft)
- Highest elevation: 1,163 m (3,816 ft)
- Lowest elevation: 0 m (0 ft)

Population (2024 census)
  - Total: 45,173
  - Density: 319.40/km^{2} (827.25/sq mi)
  - Households: 11,059
- Demonym: Vinzonians

Economy
  - Income class: 2nd municipal income class
  - Poverty incidence: 31.54% (2023)
  - Revenue: ₱ 226.7 million (2022)
  - Assets: ₱ 465.9 million (2022)
  - Expenditure: ₱ 164.2 million (2022)
  - Liabilities: ₱ 64.01 million (2022)

Service provider
  - Electricity: Camarines Norte Electric Cooperative (CANORECO)
- Time zone: UTC+8 (PST)
- ZIP code: 4603
- PSGC: 0501612000
- IDD : area code: +63 (0)54
- Native languages: Central Bikol; Tagalog

Vinzons officially the Municipality of Vinzons (Tagalog: Bayan ng Vinzons), is a municipality in the province of Camarines Norte, Philippines. According to the 2024 census, it has a population of 45,173 people.

The Calaguas Islands is under the jurisdiction of Vinzons.

== Etymology ==
The first recorded name of Vinzons was Tacboan and was later changed to Indan at which time the Mayor was Pedro Barbin. The town was then renamed "Vinzons" in honor of Wenceslao Q. Vinzons, then Governor of the province. He was the youngest delegate to the 1934 Philippine Constitutional Convention and a guerrilla leader martyred by the Japanese during World War II.

== History ==
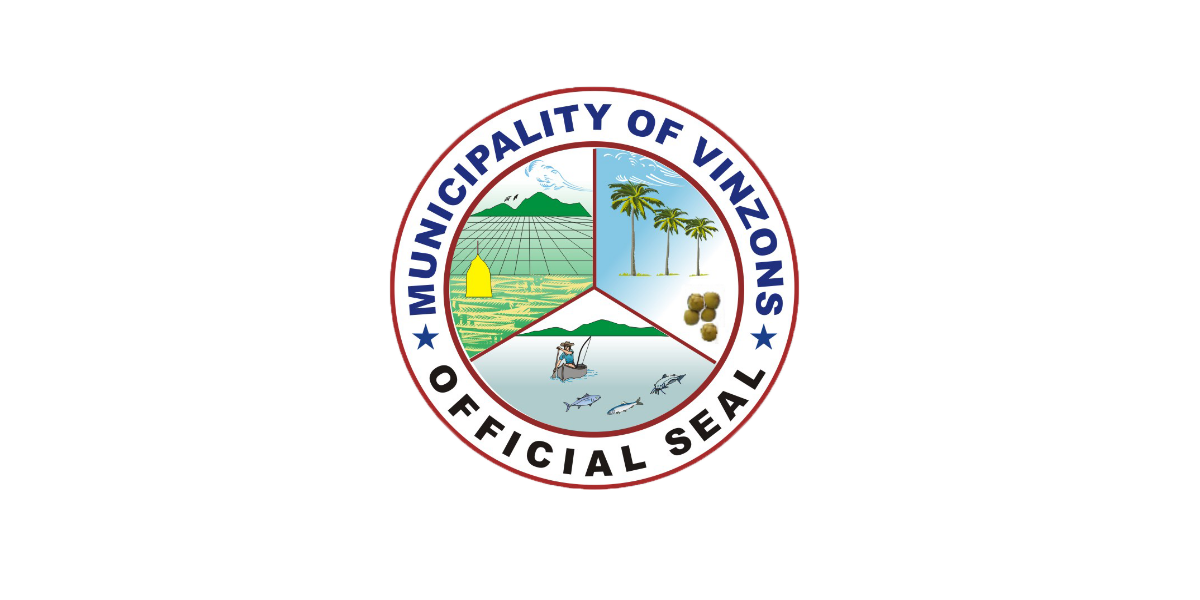
Government flag

The town was established in 1581 by the Franciscan priests without a patron saint and without a church. In 1611, Fr. Juan de Losar, OFM built a church named after Saint Peter. Fr. Losar was the first Parish Priest of the church. In 1624, the whole town of Tacboan was relocated and it was called Indan where a new church was built with the same Patron Saint, St. Peter the Apostle. The 1818 census showed the area had 675 native families and 6 Spanish-Filipino families.

== Geography ==
=== Barangays ===
Vinzons is politically subdivided into 19 barangays. Each barangay consists of puroks and some have sitios.

Listed here with their current Barangay Captains.

- Aguit-It - Roe Villanueva
- Banocboc - Welisa Salen (ABC President)
- Cagbalogo - Celso Mase
- Calangcawan Norte - Joseph Pajarillo
- Calangcawan Sur - Samuel Pajarillo
- Guinacutan - Elizalde Daniel
- Mangcayo - Roe Elep
- Mangcawayan - Gracia Austria
- Manlucugan - Ramon Avendaño
- Matango - Alvin Clacio
- Napilihan - Dolores Balane
- Pinagtigasan - Azucena Buen
- Barangay I (Poblacion)- Felix Rigodon
- Barangay II (Poblacion) - Abraham Lukban
- Barangay III (Poblacion) - Neil A. Obusan
- Sabang - Jeffrey Segundo
- Santo Domingo - Samson Balce
- Singi - Helen Almacin
- Sula - Rosemarie Abogado

=== Climate ===
Climate data for Vinzons, Camarines Norte
Month	Jan	Feb	Mar	Apr	May	Jun	Jul	Aug	Sep	Oct	Nov	Dec	Year
Mean daily maximum °C (°F)	27 (81)	27 (81)	29 (84)	31 (88)	31 (88)	30 (86)	29 (84)	29 (84)	29 (84)	29 (84)	28 (82)	27 (81)	29 (84)
Mean daily minimum °C (°F)	22 (72)	22 (72)	22 (72)	23 (73)	25 (77)	25 (77)	25 (77)	24 (75)	24 (75)	24 (75)	24 (75)	23 (73)	24 (74)
Average precipitation mm (inches)	85 (3.3)	55 (2.2)	53 (2.1)	47 (1.9)	112 (4.4)	156 (6.1)	213 (8.4)	159 (6.3)	201 (7.9)	216 (8.5)	197 (7.8)	141 (5.6)	1,635 (64.5)
Average rainy days	15.4	11.6	13.6	12.3	19.9	23.7	27.3	26.0	26.0	24.6	21.8	19.1	241.3
Source: Meteoblue

== Demographics ==
Population census of Vinzons
Year	Pop.	±% p.a.
1903	6,665	—
1918	9,072	+2.08%
1939	11,249	+1.03%
1948	14,455	+2.83%
1960	18,196	+1.94%
1970	22,804	+2.28%
1975	24,361	+1.33%
1980	26,158	+1.43%
1990	31,774	+1.96%
1995	33,182	+0.82%
2000	37,893	+2.89%
2007	39,653	+0.63%
2010	41,915	+2.04%
2015	43,485	+0.70%
2020	49,042	+2.56%
2024	45,173	−1.95%
Source: Philippine Statistics Authority

In the 2024 census, the population of Vinzons was 45,173 people, with a density of 320 inhabitants per square kilometre or 830 inhabitants per square mile.

=== Religion ===
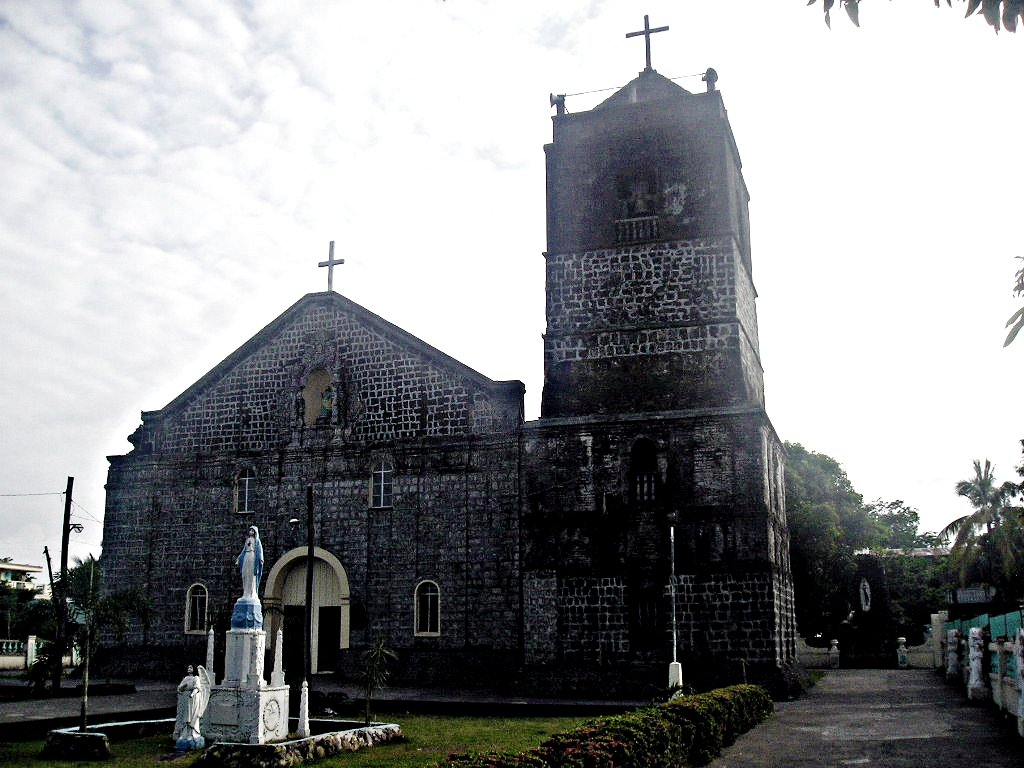
St. Peter the Apostle Church

==== Roman Catholic Churches ====
- St. Peter the Apostle Church - Fire destroyed the St. Peter the Apostle Church on 26 December 2012 at around 1:30AM in the morning which started from the old convent. The 400-year-old church was one of the oldest churches in Bicol and erected during the Spanish Colony in 1600.
- St. Paul The Apostle Quasi Parish in Sabang
- Our Lady of Peace & Good Voyage Parish in Calaguas
- Our Lady of Fatima Shrine in Mangcauayan
- Santo Domingo in Santo Domingo
- St. Augustine in Matango

== Economy ==
Poverty incidence of Vinzons (%)

Source: Philippine Statistics Authority

== Government ==
Municipal officials:

- Municipal Mayor: Agnes Ang
- Vice Mayor: Boyet Valeros
- Councilors:
  - Hon. Ligaya H. Heraldo
  - Hon. Justin "Bintao" Vinzons
  - Hon. Jonna Valeros
  - Hon. Niel Obusan
  - Hon. Gilbert B. Adorino
  - Hon. Nestor A. Pajarillo
  - Hon. Manuel D. Obusan
  - Hon. Jay Pimentel
- Ex Officio (Liga ng mga Barangay) : Hon. Welisa B. Salen
- Ex Officio (SK Federation) : Hon. Sarah Jade Icatlo

== Education ==
The Vinzons Schools District Office governs all educational institutions within the municipality. It oversees the management and operations of all private and public, from primary to secondary schools.

=== Primary and elementary schools ===
- Aguit-it Elementary School
- Banocboc Elementary School
- Cagbalogo Elementary School
- Calangacawan Norte Elementary School
- Calangacawan Sur Elementary School
- Don Miguel Lukban Elementary School
- El Trino P. Zenarosa Elementary School
- Gregorio Jardin Elementary School
- Gorgonio Obusan Elementary School
- Guinacutan Elementary School
- Juanita Balon Elementary School
- M. Guinto Elementary School
- Magcawayan Island Elementary School
- Mangcayo Elementary School
- Matango Elementary School
- P. Barbin Elementary School
- Pinagtigasan Elementary School
- St. Peter Kiddie School
- Sto. Domingo Elementary School
- Sula Elementary School
- Vinzons Christian Academy
- Vinzons Pilot Elementary School

=== Secondary schools ===
- D.Q. Liwag National High School
- E Quintela High School
- Matango National High School
- Sabang National High School
- Sarah Jane Ferrer High School
- Vinzons Pilot High School

=== Sectarian Seminary ===
- Adorno Fathers Seminary

=== Private senior high school and higher educational institutions ===
- St. Francis Caracciolo Culinary Academy - Santo Domingo

== Tourist destinations ==
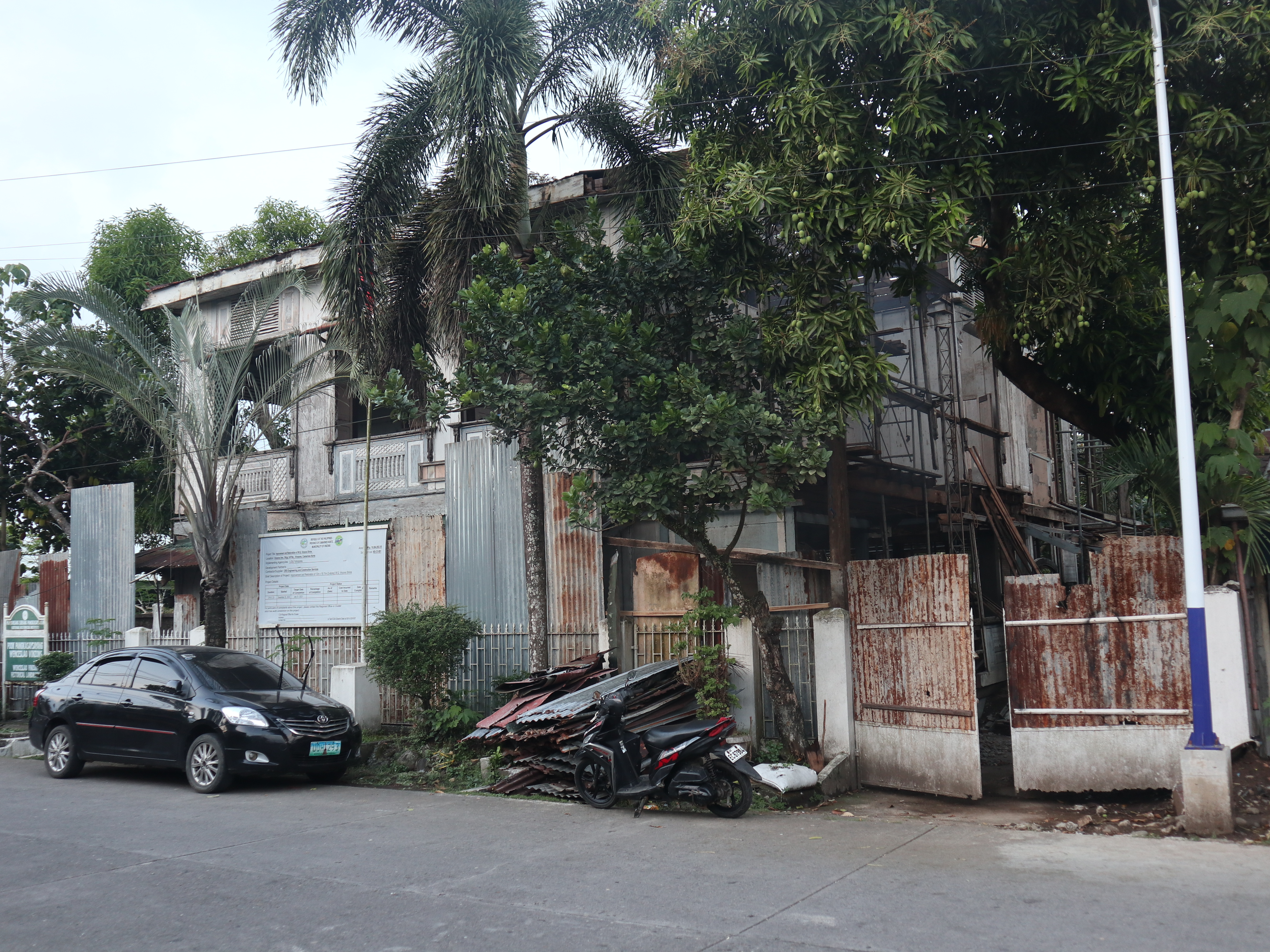
Vinzons Shrine

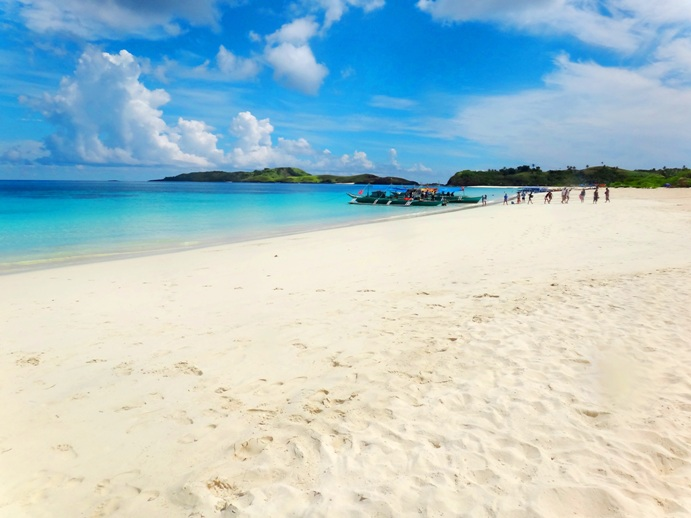
Mahabang Buhangin / Mangcawayan Island

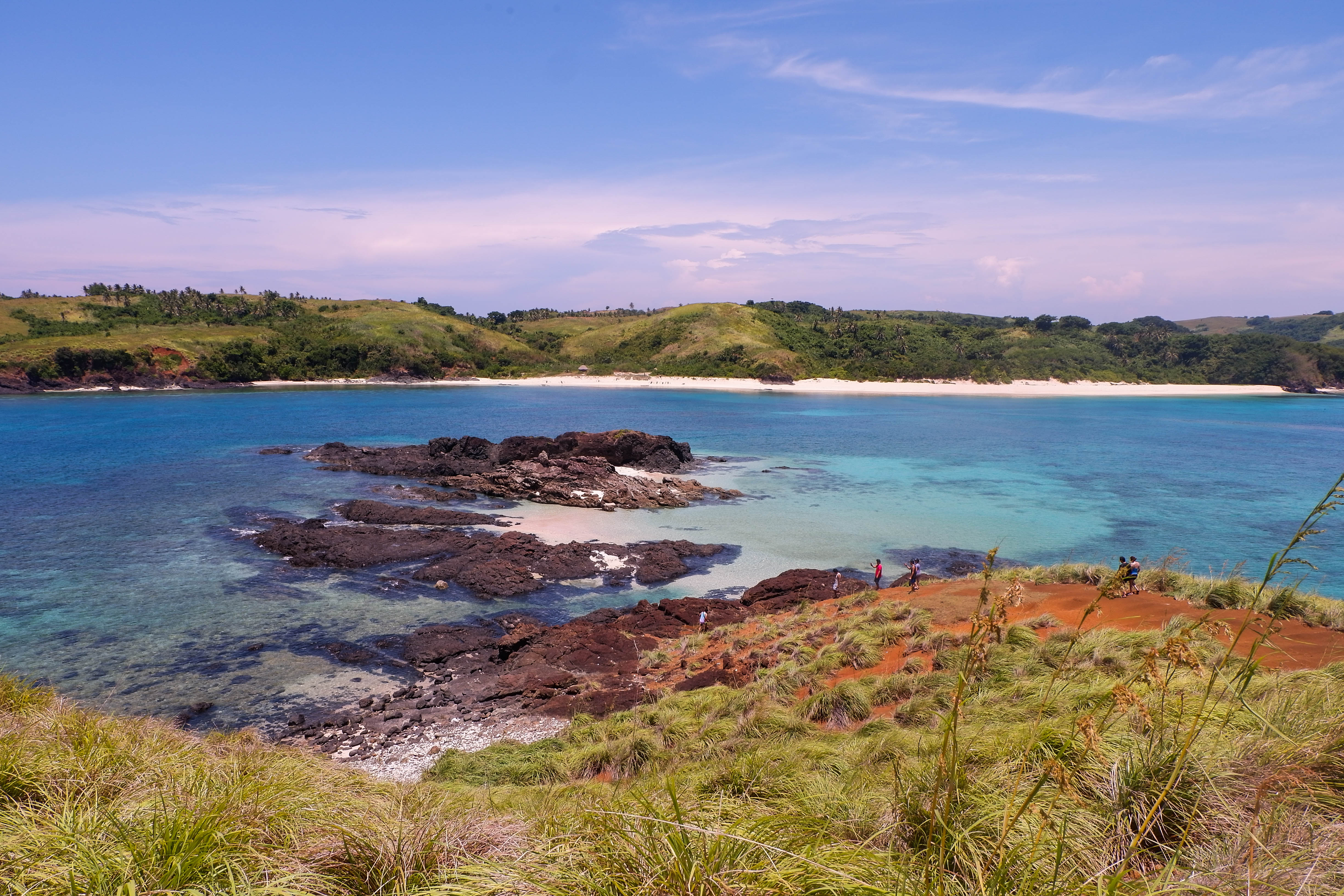
Balagbag Island

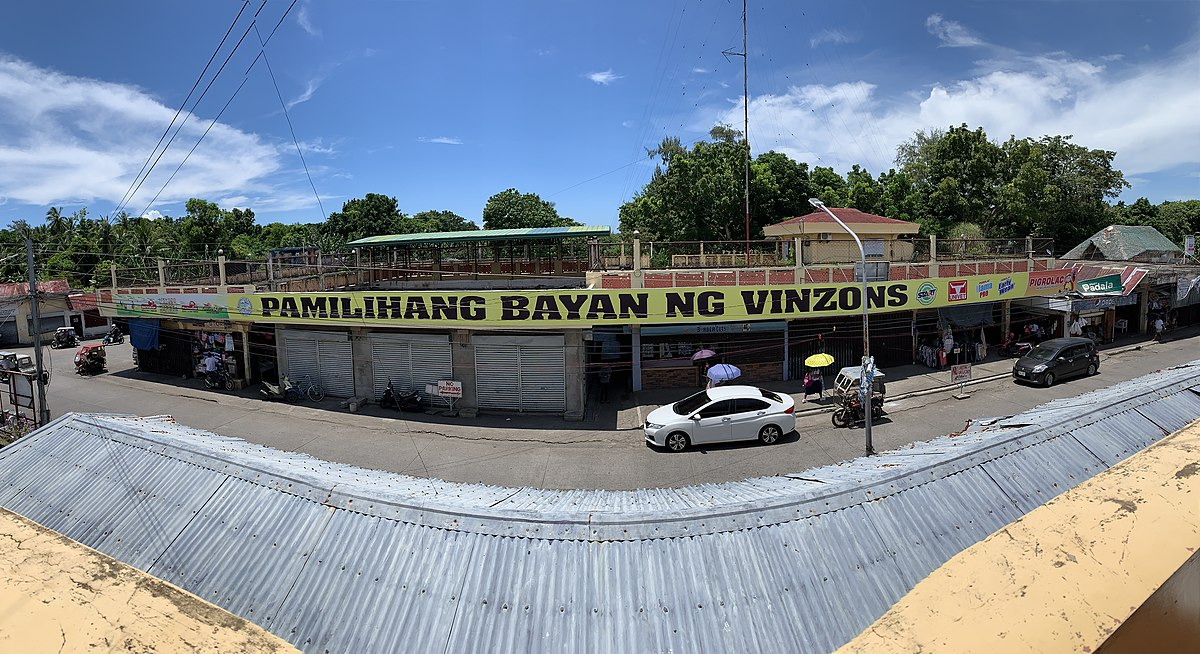
Public Market of Vinzons

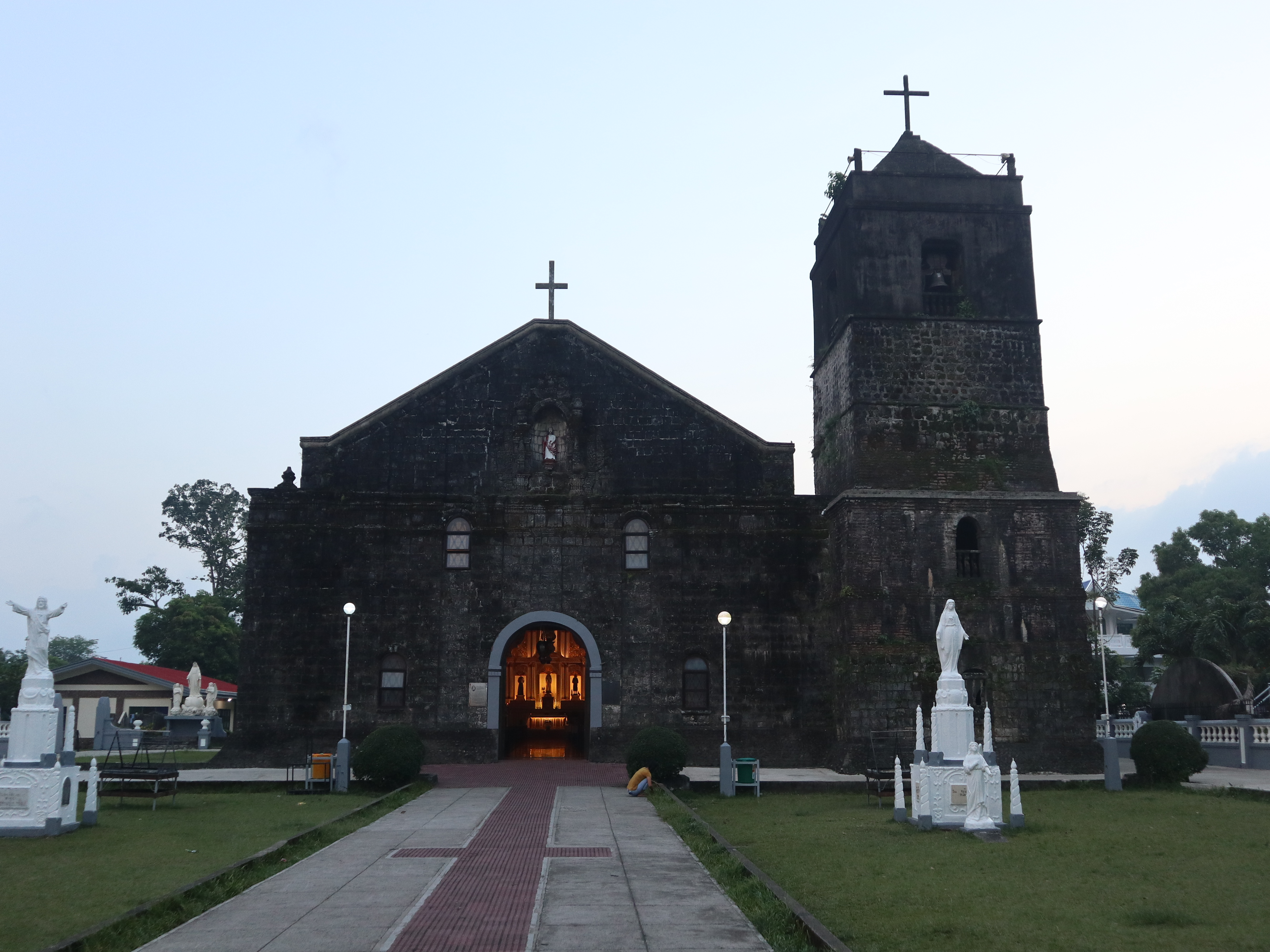
Parroquia de San Pedro Apostol / St. Peter the Apostle Church

== See also ==
- List of renamed cities and municipalities in the Philippines
- LGU Vinzons website
