= Paracale =

Municipality in Camarines Norte, Philippines

- Municipality
- Municipality of Paracale
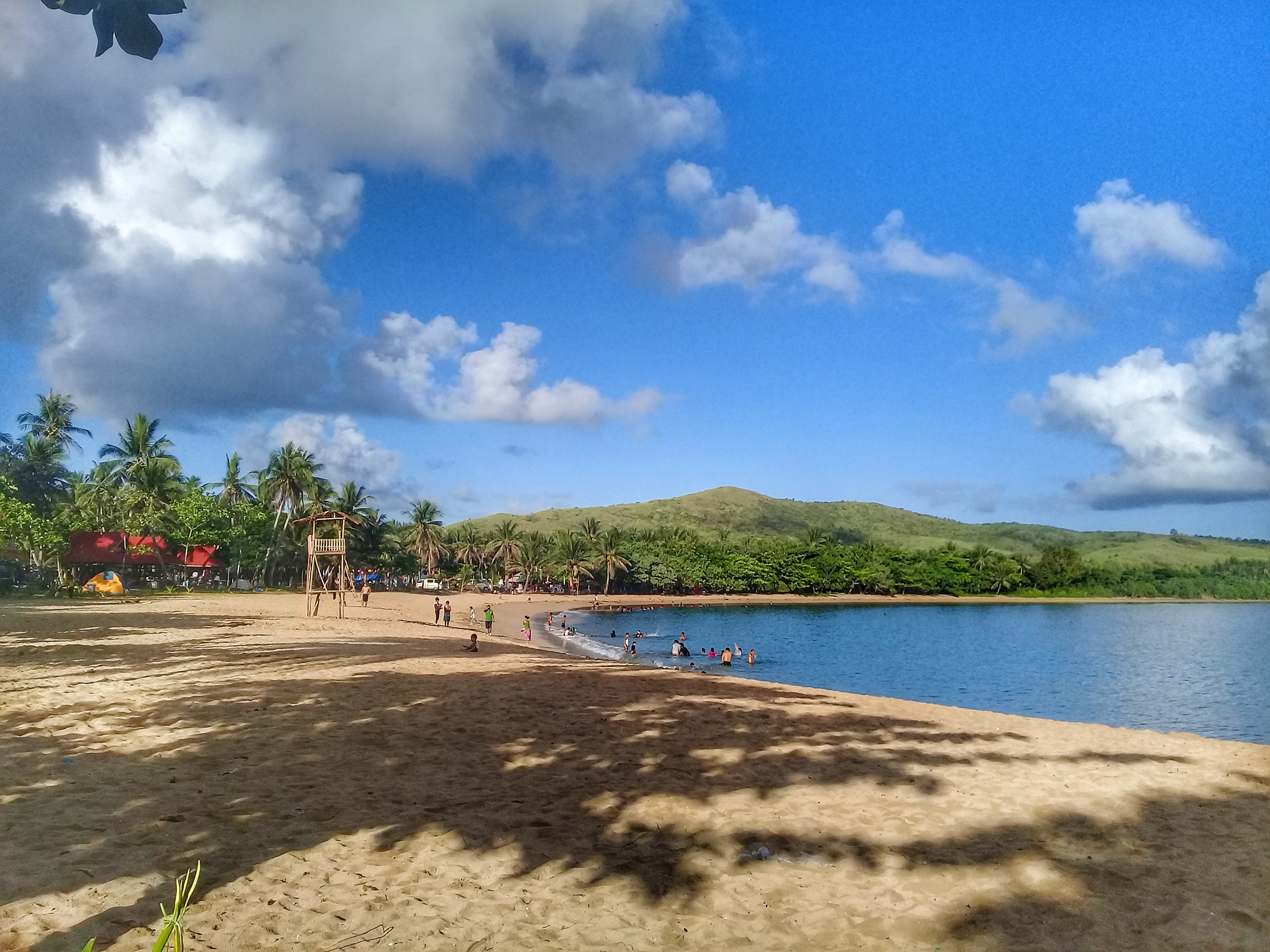
- Pulang Daga Beach Separates by two resort 1.Candelaria Beach Resort 2. Coco farm Resort

- Flag
- Nickname: Gold Town or "Town of Gold"
- Motto: Ako'y Paracaleño, yaman ko'y ginto nasa lupa nasa puso
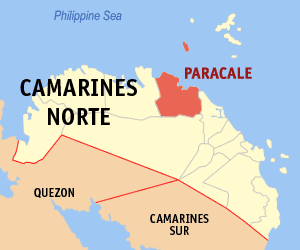
- Map of Camarines Norte with Paracale highlighted
- Interactive map of Paracale
- Location within the Philippines
- Coordinates: 14°16′48″N 122°47′13″E
- Country: Philippines
- Region: Bicol Region
- Province: Camarines Norte
- District: 1st district
- Founded: 1581
- Barangays: 27 (see Barangays)

Government
  - Type: Sangguniang Bayan
  - Mayor: Romeo Y. Moreno
  - Vice Mayor: Bernadette E. Asutilla
  - Representative: Josefina B. Tallado
  - Municipal Council: Members: Brigido A. Oco, Jr.; Amelia O. Oco; Rav Russel M. Moreno; Mario Cesar E. Cariño; Zaldy E. Moya; Darwin P. San Luis; Reno G. Pisalbon; Wilfredo Q. Peralta
  - Electorate: 38,292 voters (2025)

Area
  - Total: 197.9 km^{2} (76.4 sq mi)
- Elevation: 23 m (75 ft)
- Highest elevation: 753 m (2,470 ft)
- Lowest elevation: 0 m (0 ft)

Population (2024 census)
  - Total: 58,391
  - Density: 295.1/km^{2} (764.2/sq mi)
  - Households: 13,588

Economy
  - Income class: 1st municipal income class
  - Poverty incidence: 28.94% (2023)
  - Revenue: ₱ 259.5 million (2024)
  - Assets: ₱ 661.3 million (2024)
  - Expenditure: ₱ 253.5 million (2024)
  - Liabilities: ₱ 175.9 million (2024)

Service provider
  - Electricity: Camarines Norte Electric Cooperative (CANORECO)
- Time zone: UTC+8 (PST)
- ZIP code: 4605
- PSGC: 0501608000
- IDD : area code: +63 (0)54
- Native languages: Tagalog; Central Bikol; Manide
- Website: paracale.gov.ph

Paracale, officially the Municipality of Paracale (Tagalog: Bayan ng Paracale), is a municipality in the province of Camarines Norte, Philippines. According to the 2024 census, it has a population of 58,391 people.

== History ==
Paracale was an active fishing and small scale mining community prior to the Spanish colonial period. In 1572, attracted by news of gold deposits, Juan de Salcedo petitioned to search for mines in the Bicol region. Arriving by boat from the North, Salcedo’s expedition found mining operations at Paracale, but was forced to retreat due to sickness and lack of provisions. A more permanent settlement and mission post was established by Franciscan friars in 1581. It was established as a town in 1611. However, the mission was abandoned in 1634, reestablished by the Franciscans in 1638, but was abandoned again in 1662. In 1687, the Franciscan missionaries returned to their mission. The 1818 census showed the area had 697 native families and 54 Spanish-Filipino families.

In 1863, Paracale was then formally established as a town. Seventeen years later, the Franciscans returned to Paracale to reestablish church administration.

=== 1952 mining accident ===
On December 15, 1952, 56 miners of the Paracale Mining Co. perished when the Baluarte mine shaft they were working in collapsed and prevented them from escaping the rapidly flooding mine.

== Gold mining ==
The town's name was derived from para cale, meaning 'canal digger".

Small scale mining in Camarines Norte pre dates the Spanish colonial period, but the region came to prominence in 1626 when a sizable gold deposit was identified close to the current location of Paracale town. Spaniards employed local labour to extract gold-bearing gravel from adjacent rivers and streams, although mining operations were described as intermittent, small in scale and rarely profitable due to frequent flooding, in 1688 it was recorded that miners in Paracale were paid three reals per week plus food for extraction of gold ore.

During the period of American colonial rule dredges were used to mine alluvial gold deposits.

Artisanal mining for gold still persists in many locations adjacent to the town. An ILO report published in 2017 estimated that about half the population of the town were engaged in small scale mining activities either as a financier, mine worker, processor or independent gold panner. Compressor mining, a hazardous informal mining method where ore is extracted by divers in flooded, narrow shafts while breathing through an air tube connected to makeshift compressor, was banned in the Philippines in 2012. Nonetheless Parcale attracted significant attention in November 2013 when a collapse of informal mining operations on the beach led to the deaths of a number of compressor mining divers. In 2021, the Philippine National Police sought the closure of all illegal mining activities in Camarines Norte after components of improvised explosive devices used by the New People’s Army were established as coming from illegal mining sites in the area.

== Presence of uranium ==
According to the December 1976 study of the International Atomic Energy Agency (IAEA) there is the presence of uranium at Larap Mine in Paracale though it suggests that the Philippine geology is not likely to be favourable for a commercially viable volume of uranium.

== Barangays ==
Paracale is politically subdivided into 27 barangays. Each barangay consists of puroks and some have sitios.

- Awitan
- Bagumbayan
- Bakal
- Batobalani
- Calaburnay
- Capacuan
- Casalugan
- Dagang
- Dalnac
- Dancalan
- Gumaus
- Labnig
- Macolabo Island
- Malacbang
- Malaguit
- Mampungo
- Mangkasay
- Maybato
- Palanas
- Pinagbirayan Malaki
- Pinagbirayan Munti
- Poblacion Norte
- Poblacion Sur
- Tabas
- Talusan
- Tawig
- Tugos

== Demographics ==
Population census of Paracale
Year	Pop.	±% p.a.
1903	3,864	—
1918	6,617	+3.65%
1939	15,198	+4.04%
1948	11,801	−2.77%
1960	16,512	+2.84%
1970	21,461	+2.65%
1975	22,619	+1.06%
1980	25,308	+2.27%
1990	39,192	+4.47%
1995	43,824	+2.12%
2000	42,453	−0.68%
2007	46,856	+1.37%
2010	53,243	+4.76%
2015	59,149	+2.02%
2020	60,198	+0.37%
2024	58,391	−0.73%
Source: Philippine Statistics Authority

In the 2024 census, the population of Paracale was 58,391 people, with a density of 300 inhabitants per square kilometre or 780 inhabitants per square mile.

== Climate ==
Climate data for Paracale, Camarines Norte
Month	Jan	Feb	Mar	Apr	May	Jun	Jul	Aug	Sep	Oct	Nov	Dec	Year
Mean daily maximum °C (°F)	27 (81)	27 (81)	29 (84)	31 (88)	31 (88)	30 (86)	29 (84)	29 (84)	29 (84)	29 (84)	28 (82)	27 (81)	29 (84)
Mean daily minimum °C (°F)	22 (72)	22 (72)	22 (72)	23 (73)	25 (77)	25 (77)	25 (77)	24 (75)	24 (75)	24 (75)	24 (75)	23 (73)	24 (74)
Average precipitation mm (inches)	85 (3.3)	55 (2.2)	53 (2.1)	47 (1.9)	112 (4.4)	156 (6.1)	213 (8.4)	159 (6.3)	201 (7.9)	216 (8.5)	197 (7.8)	141 (5.6)	1,635 (64.5)
Average rainy days	15.4	11.6	13.6	12.3	19.9	23.7	27.3	26.0	26.0	24.6	21.8	19.1	241.3
Source: Meteoblue

== Economy ==
Poverty incidence of Paracale (%)

Source: Philippine Statistics Authority

Paracle’s economy is driven by agriculture and small scale, often informal gold mining and gold ore processing. Rice, corn, coconut and root crops and vegetables are the major agricultural products.

== Infrastructure ==
Transportation
Land transportation is the primary means of transporting people, goods and services from the barangay to the town proper of Paracale. The municipality is connected to its different barangays by the municipality's major roads, namely the Maharlika Highway.

Water supply
The barangays of the municipality are being served by levels I, II and III water supply. Other barangays are being served by shallow wells, deep wells or dug wells.

Power supply
Paracale is being served by electric power, formerly by the defunct Hidalgo Electric Enterprise, now by the National Power Corporation through the Camarines Norte Electric Cooperative (CANORECO). After the establishment of this cooperative, there was a great improvement in terms of power supply condition in the municipality.

Communication
Paracale has a telecommunication system that is being run by the Department of Transportation and Communication (DOTC). There are two satellites of Smart, Globe. There is postal office and has a staff of one mail carriers serving all barangays in the municipality. These personnel cannot adequately serve the entire from the lack of personnel; another problem is the difficulty in the delivery of mails in the remote and far-flung barangays.

Mining companies

- United Paragon Mining Corporation (Not operational)
- Unidragon Mining and Development Corporation (Not operational due to cease-and-desist order by MGB)
- Baotong Mining Corporation (Not operational due to cease-and-desist order by MGB)
- Konka Fulim Mining and Development Corp. (KFMDC) (Not operational)

== Media ==
Paracale and its surrounding area is being served by a local community radio, Radyo Natin 102.5

== Churches ==
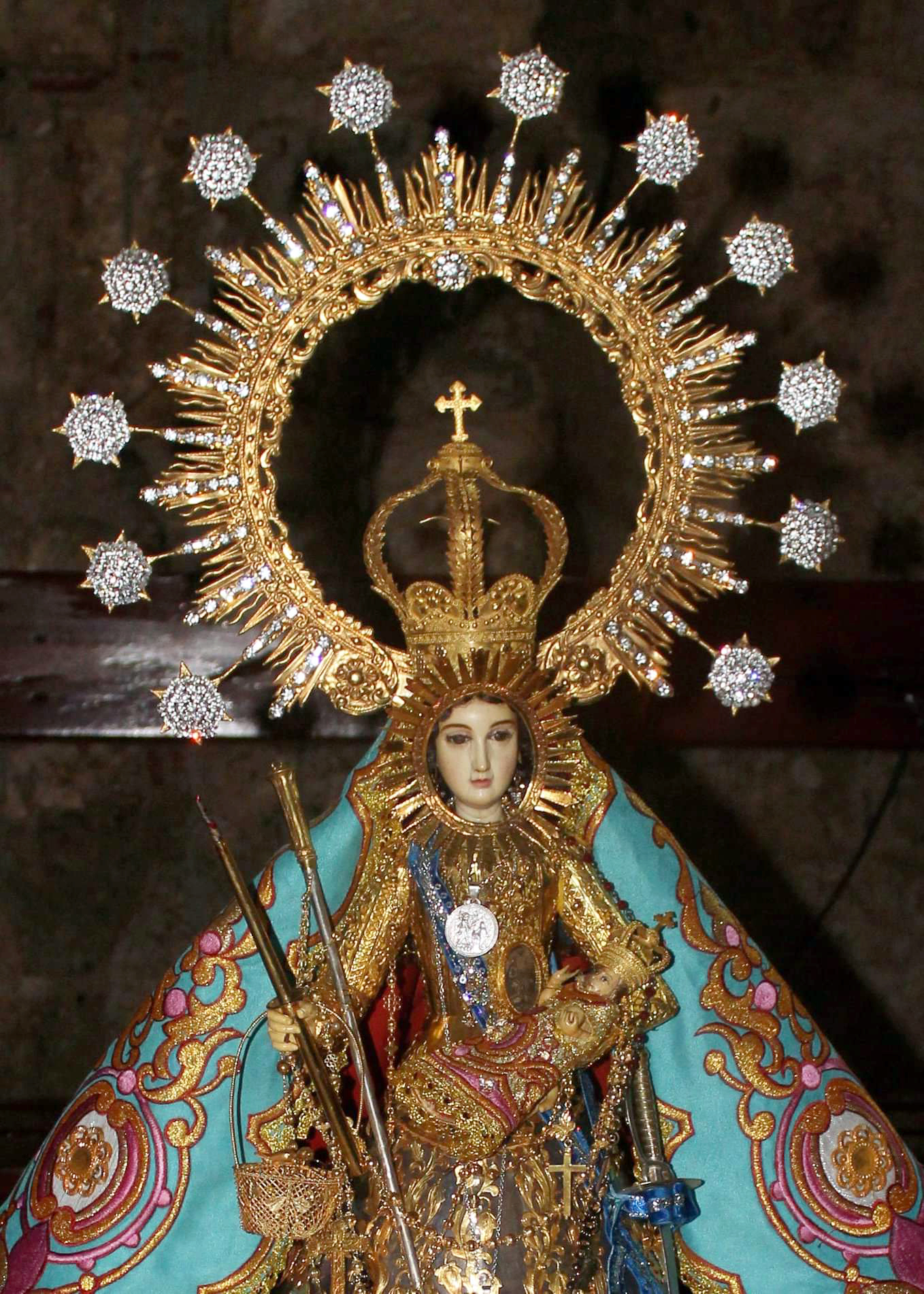
The canonically crowned image of Nuestra Señora de Candelaria de Paracale who is the patroness of the town.

- City Of Praise
- Church of Jesus Christ of Latter-Day Saints
- Iglesia Ni Cristo
- Kingdom Hall of Jehovah's Witnesses
- Members Church of God International
- Paracale Evangelical Church
- Parroquia de Nuestra Señora de Candelaria, established in 1611, it is one of the first churches in Camarines Norte and was built by Franciscan Friars. The church features the canonically crowned miraculous image of Our Lady of Candelaria.
- Parish of Saint Roch in Batobalani
- Parish of San Roque in Tabas
- Seventh Day Adventist
- United Church of Christ in the Philippines (UCCP)

== Government ==
Municipal officials:

- Mayor: Romeo Yebra Moreno
- Vice Mayor: Zaldy Moya
- Councilors:
  - SALEN, JIMBOY
  - ASUTILLA, ADET
  - MORENO, RAV RUSSEL
  - OCO, MAC
  - VILLACRUZ, BONCHIT
  - MANARANG, ACE
  - CARIÑO, MARIO CESAR
  - ATTY. MOLINA, KAYE ANGELU

== Education ==
The Paracale Schools District Office governs all educational institutions within the municipality. It oversees the management and operations of all private and public, from primary to secondary schools.

=== Public Elementary Schools ===
- Alfonso Dasco Elementary School
- Awitan Elementary School
- Bagumbayan Elementary School
- Batobalani Elementary School
- Calaburnay Elementary School
- Capacuan Elementary School
- Dagang Elementary School
- Dalnac Elementary School
- Dancalan Elementary School
- Gumaus Elementary School
- Igang Elementary School
- Labnig Elementary School
- M Era Elementary School
- Macolabo Elementary School
- Mampungo Elementary School
- Palanas Elementary School
- Paracale Central School
- Pedro V. Moreno Elementary School
- Pinagbirayan Elementary School
- S. Basilio Elementary school
- Santa Catalina Elementary School
- Tawig Elementary School
- Tugos Elementary School

=== Public Secondary Schools ===
- Batobalani National High School
- Gumaus National High School
- Maximo Manarang High School
- Paracale National High School
- Tabas National High School
