= University of Camarines Norte =

Public university in Camarines Norte, Philippines

- Pamantasan ng Camarines Norte (Filipino)
- Other name: UCN
- Former names: Camarines Norte High School (1920-1973); Camarines Norte National High School (1973-1992); Camarines Norte State College (1992-2019)
- Type: State University
- Established: 1992; 34 years ago
- Religious affiliation: Nonsectarian
- Academic affiliations: PASUC
- Chairman: Hon. Ethel Agnes P. Valenzuela, Ph.D.
- President: Atty. Ryan L. Estevez, DPA
- Vice-president: Maria Cristina C. Azuelo, Ph.D. (Vice President for Administration and Finance), Dolores C. Volante, EdD (Vice President for Academic Affairs), Rosalie A. Almadrones, Ph.D. (Vice President for Research and Extension)
- Dean: Dr. Eduardo M. Abad (Graduate School); Dr. Gehana Lamug (CBPA); Dr. Jocelyn Trinidad (CAS); Dr. Jerome H. Baldemoro; (COTT) Engr. Aireen M. Babagay (CoEng); Dr. Edgar P. Aban (CoEd); Dr. Daniel E. Maligat (CCMS); Dr. Jofhiline Dygico (CANR); Anne Marie Carreon-Arevalo (Dean/Campus Director - CFAST)
- Director: Dr. Fernando Corratchea (Entienza); Dr. Arden Peejay L. Ezaki (CANR); Lovewiserlyn O. Dela Cruz (COTT); Dr. Girly H. Naval (Extension Services); Dr. Adrian C. Guinto (Research Services; Social Policy Research Center); Rhodaviv Avila (OSSD); Dr. Jocelyn Torio (NSTP); Ronnie E. Asis (ASD); Dr. Delma Jean Abad (Center for Equity, Inclusivity, and Diversity); Engr. Aser Dino (Physical Plan Division); Engr. Ailene De Vela-Bendicio (Interllectual Property Management Office); Beverly Musa (Management System and Information Office); Rayniel Zabala (Quality Assurance Office); Emmalyn Guavez (Planning and Development Office); Dr. Arlene C. Alegre (Queen Pineapple Research and Development Institute); Dr. Ronaldo P. Dando (Integrated Sustainability and Resilience Office)
- Location: F. Pimentel Avenue, Daet, Camarines Norte, Philippines; 14°06′33″N 122°57′26″E
- Campus: Main: Daet, Camarines Norte Satellite: (Dr. Jose P. Abaño Sr. Campus / College of Education Laboratory School); Daet, Camarines Norte; (Labo Campus); Labo, Camarines Norte; (College of Trades and Technology); Jose Panganiban, Camarines Norte; (College of Fisheries, Aquatic Sciences, and Technology); Mercedes, Camarines Norte; (Ret. Judge Antonio C. Entienza Campus); Sta. Elena, Camarines Norte
- Newspaper: Breakthrough
- Colors: White; Maroon
- Sporting affiliations: SCUAA
- Mascot: Golden Kalaw
- Website: ucn.edu.ph/UCN/

- Location in Camarines Norte Location in Luzon Location in the Philippines

The University of Camarines Norte or UCN, formerly known as Camarines Norte State College (Filipino: Kolehiyong Pampamahalaan Ng Camarines Norte), is a state university formally inaugurated on November 7, 2026 in the province of Camarines Norte, Philippines. It is mandated to provide higher technological and professional instruction and training in the fields of economics, agriculture, health, engineering, education, management, finance, accounting, forest research and conservation, business and public administration as well as short-term technical and vocational courses. It is also mandated to provide and promote research and extension services, advanced studies and progressive leadership in all areas of discipline and responsibilities. Its main campus is in Daet, Camarines Norte.

== History ==
The Camarines Norte State College originated from the Camarines Norte High School which was established in 1920. On June 23, 1973, Parliamentary Bill No. 2378 was approved and signed into law converting Camarines Norte High School to Camarines Norte National High School (CNNHS). On July 23, 1991, then Congressman Renato M. Unico introduced House Bill No. 31647 in the House of Representatives during its fifth Regular Session. After it was passed by the Senate and the House of Representatives, the bill was signed into law by then President Corazon C. Aquino on April 2, 1992, as Republic Act No. 7352 also known as "An Act Converting the present Camarines Norte National High School in Municipality of Daet into a State College to be known as the Camarines Norte State College integrating for the purpose the Abaño Pilot Elementary School in Daet, Mercedes School of Fisheries in Mercedes, Camarines Norte National Agricultural School in Labo, and the Camarines Norte School of Arts and Trades in Jose Panganiban all in the province of Camarines Norte and appropriating funds thereof."

Republic Act 7352 established the initial governing body of Camarines Norte State College (CNSC) under a Board of Regents. Armand Fabella, then Secretary of Education, Culture and Sports (DECS), served as board chairman and was represented by DECS regional director Nilo Rosas, who presided over board meetings from 1992 to 1994. During this period, the institution transitioned from a secondary school to a higher education institute. In 1994, incoming DECS Secretary Ricardo Gloria assumed the position of board chairman, overseeing further organizational development.

In order to achieve a more coordinated and integrated system of higher education; to render them more effective in the formulation and implementation of policies on higher education; to provide for more relevant direction in their governance and ensure the enjoyment of academic freedom as guaranteed by the Constitution, the composition of the governing board was modified. This change in the CNSC governance was in consonance with Republic Act No. 8292, otherwise known as "The Higher Education Modernization Act of 1997" signed into law by President Fidel V. Ramos. The Act is a consolidation of Senate Bill No. 1721 and House Bill No. 4525, passed by the Senate and House of Representatives on June 3, 1997, and May 29, 1997, respectively. It is aimed to provide "for the uniform composition and powers of the Governing Boards, the manner of appointment and term of office of the president of chartered State Universities and Colleges and for other purposes". By virtue of this Act, the governing Board was renamed to Board of Trustees from Board of Regents.

Dr. Angel C. Alcala, Chair of the Commission on Higher Education (CHED), was named first chair of the Board of Trustees until his retirement. He was replaced by the incumbent chair of the CHED, Dr. Esther Albano-Garcia. As chair and presiding Officer of the Board of Trustees, she was represented by one of the CHED commissioners, Dr. Mona Dumlao-Valisno. When Dr. Mona Valisno retired in September 2001, Dr. Cristina Damasco-Padolina took over the Chairmanship of the Board.

The administration of the Camarines Norte State College was first vested in its officer-in-charge, Dr. Emma Canuto-Avellana, until the appointment of its first president, Dr. Lourdes Apuya-Cortez on July 11, 1994.

The appointment of its second president, Dr. Floria Palacio-Tagarino in mid-July 2000, marked a new milestone in the history of Camarines Norte State College.

The 3rd president of CNSC was vested to Dr. Wenifredo T. Oñate, when he was elected by the BOT on August 5, 2004, and was sworn into office on August 16, 2004.

== Campuses ==
UCN Facade

The Camarines Norte National High School, now Main Campus, has an area of 8.4213 hectares, including the Eco Athletic Field. It houses the College of Arts and Sciences, College of Business and Public Administration, College of Engineering, College of Computing and Information Sciences, and several administrative offices.

The Abaño Pilot Elementary School, now Abaño Campus, has an area of 0.8684 hectares. It was established in 1953 and was designated the pilot school of the Division of Camarines Norte in 1959 and later became a regional pilot school by virtue of its good performance in the field of elementary education. Philanthropist Dr. Jose Abaño donated the lot. It houses the Secondary and Elementary Laboratory Schools of the College of Education and the CNSC Training Center.

The Camarines Norte National Agricultural School (CNNAS), located at Talobatib, Labo, Camarines Norte, was created under Republic Act No. 1946, on June 22, 1957. It is now the site of the College of Agriculture and Natural Resources, Talobatib Campus. It has a land area of 44.43 hectares with a 1,000-hectare forest reserve in Malabtog, Labo, Camarines Norte.

The former Camarines Norte School of Arts and Trade, now the College of Trades and Technology located in the town proper of Jose Panganiban, Camarines Norte was organized during the early 1970s to develop manpower skills and to produce highly trained professionals in the fields of arts and trades. It has a land area of 8.8960 hectares.

The Institute of Fisheries and Marine Sciences, Mercedes Campus, is located in Barangay San Roque of the Municipality of Mercedes. The sprawling 11.0-hectare area showcases the aquaculture project, which would enhance the income generating potential of the State College. The campus was formerly known as the Mercedes School of Fisheries which was established during the Martial Law period by virtue of Presidential Decree No. 1050 series of 1977.

== List of presidents ==
- Atty. Ryan L. Estevez, DPA - 7th CNSC President (1st University President)
- Dr. Marlo M. De La Cruz- 6th CNSC President
- Dr. Rusty Abanto - 5th CNSC President
- Dr. Monsito Ilarde - 4th CNSC President
- Dr. Wenifredo T. Oñate - 3rd CNSC President
- Dr. Floria Palacio-Tagarino - 2nd CNSC President
- Dr. Lourdes Apuya-Cortez - 1st CNSC President
