= Josefina Tallado =

Filipino politician (born 1969)

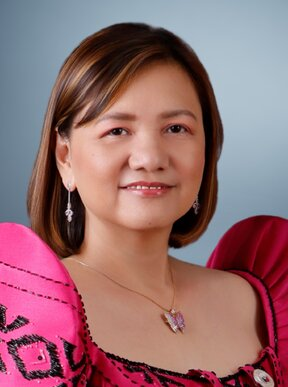
- Official portrait, 2025

Member of the House of Representatives of the Philippines for Camarines Norte's 1st congressional district
- Incumbent
- Assumed office June 30, 2019

Personal details
- Born: Josefina Baning; May 7, 1969 (age 57) Labo, Camarines Norte, Philippines
- Party: NPC (2015–2018; 2026–present)
- Other party: Lakas (2023–2026); PDP-Laban (2018–2023)
- Spouse: Edgar Tallado

Josefina Baning Tallado is a Filipino politician who is a member of the House of Representatives since 2019. In October 2014, she was declared missing along with her aide. She resurfaced shortly after, stating that she fled in fear of her husband. She lost in the 2016 elections, but won in the 2019, 2022, and the 2025 elections.

== 2016 elections ==
She ran for Camarines Norte's 1st congressional district in the 2016 Philippine House of Representatives elections under the Nationalist People's Coalition. She lost to Jojo Unico of the Liberal Party, gaining 53,620 votes.

== Political career ==
She ran again for Camarines Norte's 1st district in the 2019 Philippine House of Representatives elections under Partido Demokratiko Pilipino. She won with 65,013 votes, beating the incumbent representative by a slight margin. She also beat an independent candidate.

She ran again for the 1st district in the 2022 Philippine House of Representatives elections under Partido Demokratiko Pilipino. She won with 79,882 votes, 51.69 percent of the votes, slightly beating Dr. Cathy Reyes of the National Unity Party by a two percent margin. During her tenure in the 19th Congress of the Philippines, she supported the welfare of children and senior citizens.

She ran for the first district in the 2025 Philippine House of Representatives elections under Lakas–CMD. She won with 79,781 votes, 20.12 percent of the votes, beating her opponent Cathy Reyes by a small one percent margin.

== Personal life ==
She is the wife of Camarines Norte governor Edgar Tallado. In October 2014, Tallado was declared missing along with her aide. The military created "Task Force Josie" to help find her. Her lawyer said that she had Battered woman syndrome after fleeing her home in fear. On October 22, she surfaced, stating that she left her home in fear of her husband.

== See also ==
- 18th Congress of the Philippines
- 19th Congress of the Philippines
