= DWSE =

Defunct radio station in Camarines Norte, Philippines

- Daet; Philippines
- Broadcast area: Camarines Norte
- Frequency: 103.7 MHz

Programming
- Format: Silent

Ownership
- Owner: Kaissar Broadcasting Network

History
- First air date: March 19, 2007
- Last air date: March 2023
- Former call signs: DWSL
- Former names: Boom FM (2019–2021); DWSE (2022-2023)

Technical information
- Licensing authority: NTC

DWSE (103.7 FM) is a radio station owned by Kaissar Broadcasting Network.
