= Camarines Norte's 1st congressional district =

Legislative district of the Philippines

- Constituency for the House of Representatives of the Philippines
- Map of Camarines Norte showing the location of its 1st district

- Location of city/province within the Philippines
- Province: Camarines Norte
- Region: Bicol Region
- Population: 292,871
- Electorate: 192,328 (2022)
- Major settlements: 5 LGUs: Municipalities; Capalonga; Jose Panganiban; Labo; Paracale; Santa Elena
- Area: 1,491.05 km^{2} (575.70 sq mi)

Current constituency
- Representative: Josefina Tallado
- Political party: NPC
- Congressional bloc: Majority

Camarines Norte's 1st congressional district is one of the two congressional districts of the Philippines in Camarines Norte. It has been represented in the House of Representatives of the Philippines since 2010. Previously included in Camarines Norte's at-large congressional district, it includes the western half of the province, bordering Quezon. It is currently represented in the 20th Congress by Josefina Tallado of the Nationalist People's Coalition.

== Representation history ==
#	Image	Member	Term of office		Congress	Party	Electoral history	Constituent LGUs
#	Image	Member	Start	End	Congress	Party	Electoral history	Constituent LGUs
District created October 22, 2009 from Camarines Norte's at-large district.
1		Renato Unico, Jr.	June 30, 2010	June 30, 2013	15th	Lakas	Elected in 2010.	2010–present: Capalonga, Jose Panganiban, Labo, Paracale, Santa Elena
1		Renato Unico, Jr.	June 30, 2010	June 30, 2013	15th	NUP	Elected in 2010.	2010–present: Capalonga, Jose Panganiban, Labo, Paracale, Santa Elena
2		Cathy Barcelona-Reyes	June 30, 2013	June 30, 2016	16th	NUP	Elected in 2013.	2010–present: Capalonga, Jose Panganiban, Labo, Paracale, Santa Elena
2		Cathy Barcelona-Reyes	June 30, 2013	June 30, 2016	16th	Liberal	Elected in 2013.	2010–present: Capalonga, Jose Panganiban, Labo, Paracale, Santa Elena
3		Renato Unico, Jr.	June 30, 2016	June 30, 2019	17th	PDP–Laban	Elected in 2016.	2010–present: Capalonga, Jose Panganiban, Labo, Paracale, Santa Elena
3		Renato Unico, Jr.	June 30, 2016	June 30, 2019	17th	NUP	Elected in 2016.	2010–present: Capalonga, Jose Panganiban, Labo, Paracale, Santa Elena
4		Josefina Tallado	June 30, 2019	Present	18th	PDP–Laban	Elected in 2019.	2010–present: Capalonga, Jose Panganiban, Labo, Paracale, Santa Elena
4		Josefina Tallado	June 30, 2019	Present	19th	Lakas	Re-elected in 2022.	2010–present: Capalonga, Jose Panganiban, Labo, Paracale, Santa Elena
4		Josefina Tallado	June 30, 2019	Present	20th	NPC	Re-elected in 2025.	2010–present: Capalonga, Jose Panganiban, Labo, Paracale, Santa Elena

== Election results ==
=== 2010 ===
2010 Philippine House of Representatives elections at Camarines Norte's 1st district
Party	Candidate	Votes	%
Lakas–Kampi	Renato Unico Jr.	49,556	55.55
Liberal	Wilfredo Chato, Jr.	28,179	31.59
Independent	Pamela Pardo	7,353	8.24
Independent	Jose Español, Jr.	3,107	3.48
Independent	Renato Verzo	1,014	1.14
Total votes		89,209	100.00
Lakas–Kampi win (new seat)			

=== 2013 ===
2013 Philippine House of Representatives elections at Camarines Norte's 1st district
Party	Candidate	Votes	%
NUP	Catherine Barcelona-Reyes	49,095	47.40
Liberal	Winifredo Oco	43,290	41.80
Margin of victory		5,805	5.60%
Invalid or blank votes		11,185	10.80
Total votes		103,570	100.00
NUP hold			

=== 2016 ===
2016 Philippine House of Representatives elections at Camarines Norte's 1st district
Party	Candidate	Votes	%
Liberal	Renato Unico Jr.	56,143	
NPC	Josefina Tallado	53,620	
Invalid or blank votes		15,058	
Total votes		124,821	
Liberal hold			

=== 2019 ===
2019 Philippine House of Representatives elections at Camarines Norte's 1st district
Party	Candidate	Votes	%
PDP–Laban	Josefina Tallado	65,924	56.71
NUP	Renato Unico	57,439	45.22
Independent	Philip Peñaflor	3,655	2.87
Valid ballots		127,018	91.88
Invalid or blank votes		11,229	8.12
Total votes		138,247	100%
PDP–Laban gain from NUP			

=== 2022 ===
2022 Philippine House of Representatives elections at Camarines Norte's 1st district
Party	Candidate	Votes	%
PDP–Laban	Josefina Tallado	79,882	51.69
NUP	Cathy Barcelona-Reyes	74,662	48.31
Total votes		154,544	100%
PDP–Laban hold			

=== 2025 ===
Candidate	Party	Votes	%
Josefina Tallado (incumbent)	Lakas–CMD	79,781	50.30
Cathy Barcelona-Reyes	Partido Federal ng Pilipinas	78,838	49.70
Total		158,619	100.00
Valid votes		158,619	95.01
Invalid/blank votes		8,327	4.99
Total votes		166,946	100.00
Registered voters/turnout		196,307	85.04
Lakas–CMD hold			
Source: Commission on Elections

== See also ==
- Legislative districts of Camarines Norte
