= Labo, Camarines Norte =

Municipality in Camarines Norte, Philippines

Labo
- Municipality
- Municipality of Labo
- Flag Seal

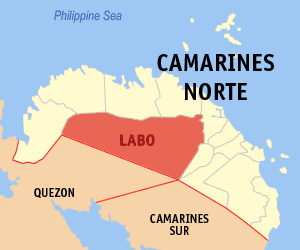
- Map of Camarines Norte with Labo highlighted
- Interactive map of Labo
- Location within the Philippines
- Coordinates: 14°09′22″N 122°49′46″E
- Country: Philippines
- Region: Bicol Region
- Province: Camarines Norte
- District: 1st district
- Founded: September 8, 1800
- Barangays: 52 (see Barangays)

Government
  - Type: Sangguniang Bayan
  - Mayor: Severino H. Francisco, Jr.
  - Vice Mayor: Alvin G. Bardon
  - Representative: Josefina B. Tallado
  - Municipal Council: Members: Rey Kenneth N. Oning; Cherry May A. Masbate; Dante V. Alaon; Norman John O. Oco; Elpidio E. Tenorio; Nelson V. Villafuerte; Ronel H. Laguador; Eric S. Pasatiempo
  - Electorate: 69,008 voters (2025)

Area
  - Total: 589.36 km^{2} (227.55 sq mi)
- Elevation: 38 m (125 ft)
- Highest elevation: 308 m (1,010 ft)
- Lowest elevation: 2 m (6.6 ft)

Population (2024 census)
  - Total: 108,319
  - Density: 183.79/km^{2} (476.02/sq mi)
  - Households: 25,089

Economy
  - Income class: 1st municipal income class
  - Poverty incidence: 26.88% (2023)
  - Revenue: ₱ 516 million (2024)
  - Assets: ₱ 2,070 million (2024)
  - Expenditure: ₱ 434.3 million (2024)
  - Liabilities: ₱ 222.6 million (2024)

Service provider
  - Electricity: Camarines Norte Electric Cooperative (CANORECO)
- Time zone: UTC+8 (PST)
- ZIP code: 4604, 4612 (Tulay Na Lupa)
- PSGC: 0501606000
- IDD : area code: +63 (0)54
- Native languages: Tagalog; Manide
- Website: https://labo.gov.ph

Labo, officially the Municipality of Labo (Tagalog: Bayan ng Labo), is a municipality in the province of Camarines Norte, Philippines. According to the 2024 census, it has a population of 108,319 people.

== Geography ==
The town of Labo is geographically located relatively at the center of the province of Camarines Norte. It is situated at the coordinates between 14°01'06" and 14°11" North latitudes and 122°21'00" and 122°52'20" East longitudes. On the North, it is bounded by the municipalities of Paracale, Jose Panganiban, and Capalonga, on the South, by the province of Quezon, adjoining province of Camarines Sur, on the East by the municipalities of Vinzons and San Vicente, and on the West by the municipality of Santa Elena. The Maharlika highway links this municipality to provinces and cities of the Bicol Region and the Calabarzon (Region IV-A) region. Labo is 16 kilometres (9.9 mi) from Daet and 326 kilometres (203 mi) from Manila.

Its aggregate land area of 648.84 km^{2} occupies more than 25% of the total land area of the province. Its 52 component barangays represent 18.44% of the total barangays of the province. There are five (5) classified as urban barangays namely Dalas, Gumamela, Kalamunding, Pinya, and Tulay na Lupa, and the remaining forty-seven are considered as rural.

The surface of the municipality is generally rugged, rolling hills and mountainous terrain with relative small rollings and flat terrain. Mt. Cadig (736 meters above sea level), Mt. Labo (1544 meters above sea level), Mt. Bagacay (786 meters above sea level) and Mt. Nalisbitan (265 meters above sea level) form the Southern Cordillera. Boundaries of Camarines Norte, Camarines Sur, and Quezon provinces converge on Mt. Labo, which is the highest peak in the province. Mt. Bagacay serves as a boundary between municipalities of Paracale and Labo and it as well guards the municipality from strong north winds especially during typhoons. Mt. Labo, Mt. Bagacay, and Mt. Cadig are the three major known dormant volcanoes in the municipality. The north-west portion of the municipality is greatly affected by 2 major fault and earthquake lines accruing in the province, while other trends affect north-north-west along Mt. Cadig passing through the barangays of Guisican and Bayabas. Like its neighbors, Panganiban and Paracale, there is a vast deposit of gold ore in the mountains of Labo, Camarines Norte.

=== Barangays ===
Labo is politically subdivided into 52 barangays. Each barangay consists of puroks and some have sitios.

Barangay	Population (2024)	Urbanization
Anahaw	2,156	Rural
Anameam	1,494	Rural
Awitan	607	Rural
Baay	2,079	Rural
Bagacay	1,139	Rural
Bagong Silang I	3,208	Rural
Bagong Silang II	1,726	Rural
Bagong Silang III	972	Rural
Bakiad	1,996	Rural
Bautista	3,787	Rural
Bayabas	1,342	Rural
Bayan-bayan	506	Rural
Benit	886	Rural
Bulhao	2,673	Rural
Cabatuhan	1,603	Rural
Cabusay	1,860	Rural
Calabasa	2,183	Rural
Canapawan	2,707	Rural
Daguit	3,805	Rural
Dalas	5,654	Urban
Dumagmang	3,020	Rural
Exciban	3,156	Rural
Fundado	1,758	Rural
Gumamela	2,018	Urban
Guinacutan	1,245	Rural
Guisican	1,880	Rural
Iberica	2,239	Rural
Kalamunding	793	Urban
Lugui	3,125	Rural
Mabilo I	1,627	Rural
Mabilo II	2,190	Rural
Macogon	2,390	Rural
Mahawan-hawan	1,710	Rural
Malangcao-Basud	1,987	Rural
Malasugui	3,603	Rural
Malatap	2,800	Rural
Malaya	1,756	Rural
Malibago	1,168	Rural
Maot	489	Rural
Masalong	4,750	Rural
Matanlang	687	Rural
Napaod	1,138	Rural
Pag-Asa	1,488	Rural
Pangpang	675	Rural
Pinya	1,189	Urban
San Antonio	1,787	Rural
San Francisco	718	Rural
Santa Cruz	1,262	Rural
Submakin	355	Rural
Talobatib	4,167	Rural
Tigbinan	3,120	Rural
Tulay na Lupa	5,646	Urban

== Climate ==
Climate data for Labo, Camarines Norte
Month	Jan	Feb	Mar	Apr	May	Jun	Jul	Aug	Sep	Oct	Nov	Dec	Year
Mean daily maximum °C (°F)	27 (81)	27 (81)	29 (84)	31 (88)	31 (88)	30 (86)	29 (84)	29 (84)	29 (84)	29 (84)	28 (82)	27 (81)	29 (84)
Mean daily minimum °C (°F)	22 (72)	22 (72)	22 (72)	23 (73)	25 (77)	25 (77)	25 (77)	24 (75)	24 (75)	24 (75)	24 (75)	23 (73)	24 (74)
Average precipitation mm (inches)	85 (3.3)	55 (2.2)	53 (2.1)	47 (1.9)	112 (4.4)	156 (6.1)	213 (8.4)	159 (6.3)	201 (7.9)	216 (8.5)	197 (7.8)	141 (5.6)	1,635 (64.5)
Average rainy days	15.4	11.6	13.6	12.3	19.9	23.7	27.3	26.0	26.0	24.6	21.8	19.1	241.3
Source: Meteoblue

There is no pronounced dry season and maximum rain period from December to January.

== Demographics ==
Population census of Labo
Year	Pop.	±% p.a.
1903	5,246	—
1918	8,062	+2.91%
1939	13,181	+2.37%
1948	14,977	+1.43%
1960	33,168	+6.85%
1970	47,916	+3.74%
1975	52,781	+1.96%
1980	56,690	+1.44%
1990	70,371	+2.19%
1995	77,414	+1.80%
2000	81,388	+1.08%
2007	88,087	+1.10%
2010	92,041	+1.61%
2015	101,082	+1.80%
2020	109,245	+1.65%
2024	108,319	−0.20%
Source: Philippine Statistics Authority

In the 2024 census, the population of Labo was 108,319 people, with a density of 180 inhabitants per square kilometre or 470 inhabitants per square mile.

== Economy ==
Poverty incidence of Labo (%)

Source: Philippine Statistics Authority

Labo being located at the center of the province. It serves as the agricultural center as well as potential investment destination and promotion center for business, trades, and secondary industrial growth center. It is abundant with natural resources such as gold, nickel, iron, magnetite sand, copper, lead and manganese. Most of the provincial water supplies are located at barangay Tulay na Lupa and Lugui which serves seven out of the 12 municipalities. Agriculture is the leading livelihood of the residents of Labo. Due to abundant forest products such as rattan and bamboo, local folks tend to manufacture and market handicrafts.

An area of 390.39 km^{2} (65.17% of municipal's land area) is devoted to agricultural crop production, 343.46 km^{2} of which are coconut plantations. On the other hand, 18.47 km^{2} is used for rice production. Banana production is also popular in the province, followed by pineapple and pili.

Tourism is also a good source of income for Labo, being surrounded by freshwater and mountains suitable for hikings.

Other community livelihood follows: pineapple and coco-based processing and preservation, pineapple weaving (Barong), jewelry making and accessories, foods manufacturing and beverages processing, other tourism related industries and wood and bamboo furniture making.

== Tourism ==
=== Caves ===
- Mt. Cadig Cave - Located at Mt. Cadig, Barangay Bayabas. Along the highway it is 52 km drive from the town proper. From Maharlika highway it can be hiked via Barangay Bayabas or Barangay Guisican. Hills, trees and rocky slopes hide this cave from view. The cave is composed of several dark compartments of stalactites and stalagmites. This cave is getting attention to become town's priority tourist attraction.
- Mambuaya Cave - Barangay Fundado
- Pintong Gubat

=== Churches ===
- IGLESIA NI CRISTO Lokal Ng Labo
- IGLESIA NI CRISTO Lokal Ng Bagong Silang
- Parish of Saint John The Apostle & Evangelist
- Parish of Saint Didacus of Alcala in Bagong Silang
- Quasi-Parish of the Holy Family in Talobatib
- Holy Trinity College Seminary in Bautista
- Saint Cajetan Parish Church Tulay na Lupa

=== Festivals ===
- Busig-on Festival
- May Festival
- Agro-Industrial Fair
- Search for "Miss Labo"
- Search for "Mr. Labo"
- Miss Gay Beauty Pageant
- Annual Marian Exhibit and procession - held every September 8 as part of Mary's birthday celebration and the founding anniversary of Labo, an exposition of priceless arts composed of antiques, vintages and new images of Maria the mother of Jesus. The local artisans, camameros and florists of Camarines Norte and Camarines Sur joined in cooperation with the local government of Labo and the Diocese of Daet for the preparation of this event, from the exhibition ended with Marian procession.

=== Historical landmarks ===
- Gen. Vicente R. Lukban Landmark
- Battle of Tigbinan
- Hagdan Bato
- Labo Museum
- Veteran's Monument
- Centennial Monument
- Basilio Bautista

=== Recreation and hiking ===
- Saltahan Falls - Barangay Awitan
- Labo People's Park
- Kukod Kabayo Rest Area
- Tan-awan / Bilad na Bato - Barangay Fundado

=== Rivers ===
- Busig-on River
- Labo River
- Matogdon River
- Abasig River - Barangay Baay
- Sinag-Tala

=== Waterfalls ===
- Saltahan Falls - Barangay Awitan
- Palanas Falls - Barangay Pag-asa
- Maligaya Falls - Barangay Submakin
- Binuang Falls - Barangay Daguit
- Malatap Falls - Barangay Malatap
- Burok-Busok Falls - Barangay Bagong Silang II
- Turayog Falls - Barangay Fundado

== Education ==
There are two schools district offices which govern all educational institutions within the municipality. They oversee the management and operations of all private and public, from primary to secondary schools. These are the:

- Labo East Schools District
- Labo West Schools District

=== Primary and elementary schools ===
- Agapito Racelis Elementary School
- Baay Elementary School
- Bagong Silang II Elementary School
- Bagong Silang III Elementary School
- Bautista Elementary School
- Bayabas Elementary School
- Bayanbayan Elementary School
- Bulhao Elementary School
- Claudio Villagen Elementary School
- Cleofas R. Dando Elementary School
- Daguit Elementary School
- Don Miguel Lukban Elementary School
- E. Obmana Elementary School
- F. Caudilla Elementary School
- Felix Asis Elementary School
- Florence Elementary School
- Fundado Elementary School
- G. Cale Elementary School
- G. Palado Sr. Elementary School
- G. Zabala - B. Placido Elementary School
- Gavino Vinzons Elementary School
- Kabungahan Elementary School
- Kanapawan Elementary School
- L. Villamonte Elementary School
- Labo Elementary school
- Labo Learning Center
- Lamp Foundational Learning Center
- Litordan Elementary School
- Mabilo Elementary School
- Macogon Elementary School
- Mahawan-hawan Elementary School
- Malapat Elementary School
- Malasugui Elementary School
- Malatap Elementary School
- Malibago Elementary School
- Maligaya Elementary School
- Manila Bicol South Road Academy
- Marcos Pimentel Elementary School
- Matanlang Elementary School
- Napaod Elementary School
- Miracle Life Rhema School
- New Life Gospel Academy
- Pampang Elementary School
- Patag Elementary School
- Praise Christian Academy
- Severino Francisco Elementary School
- St. John The Apostle Academy
- St. Martin School
- Tulay Na Lupa Elementary School

=== Secondary schools ===
- Anameam High School
- Aniceta De Lara Pimentel High School
- Bagong Silang I High School
- Bagong Silang II High School
- Calabasa Integrated School
- Camarines Norte International School
- Daguit National High School
- Dumagmang Integrated School
- Kabatuhan Integrated School
- Labo Science and Technology High School
- Labo National High School
- Malaya Integrated School
- Pag-Asa High School
- Palali Integrated School
- Talobatib High School
- Tigbinan National High School
- Tulay Na Lupa National High School

=== Higher educational institutions ===
- ADR Bicol International Technological College
- Camarines Norte College
- Holy Trinity College Seminary
- Northills College of Asia
