= Capalonga =

Municipality in Camarines Norte, Philippines

- Municipality
- Municipality of Capalonga
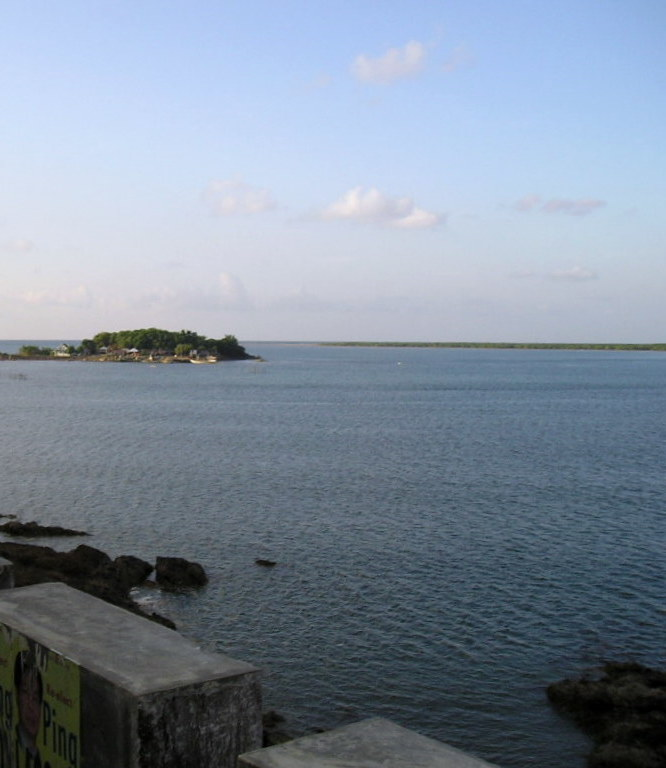
- Coast of Capalonga

- Flag Seal
- Motto: Sibol Capalonga: Sibol, Unlad, Sigla. Capalonga Baga!
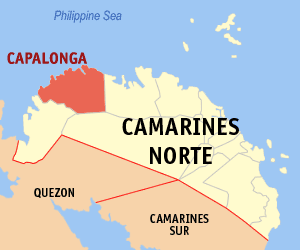
- Map of Camarines Norte with Capalonga highlighted
- Interactive map of Capalonga
- Location within the Philippines
- Coordinates: 14°19′53″N 122°29′34″E
- Country: Philippines
- Region: Bicol Region
- Province: Camarines Norte
- District: 1st district
- Founded: 1634
- Barangays: 22 (see Barangays)

Government
  - Type: Sangguniang Bayan
  - Mayor: Luz E. Ricasio
  - Vice Mayor: Marsha B. Esturas
  - Representative: Josefina B. Tallado
  - Municipal Council: Members: Caroline O. Portugal; Mariano Arguelles; Jumaro R. Parale; Arlene V. Mena; Elmer M. Malaluan; Fatima Regine O. Navarro; Abel P. Malaluan; Senandro M. Jalgalado
  - Electorate: 25,020 voters (2025)

Area
  - Total: 290.00 km^{2} (111.97 sq mi)
- Elevation: 17 m (56 ft)
- Highest elevation: 170 m (560 ft)
- Lowest elevation: 0 m (0 ft)

Population (2024 census)
  - Total: 32,800
  - Density: 113/km^{2} (293/sq mi)
  - Households: 8,344

Economy
  - Income class: 1st municipal income class
  - Poverty incidence: 29.83% (2023)
  - Revenue: ₱ 215.6 million (2024)
  - Assets: ₱ 664.3 million (2024)
  - Expenditure: ₱ 184.4 million (2024)
  - Liabilities: ₱ 90.18 million (2024)

Service provider
  - Electricity: Camarines Norte Electric Cooperative (CANORECO)
- Time zone: UTC+8 (PST)
- ZIP code: 4607
- PSGC: 0501602000
- IDD : area code: +63 (0)54
- Native languages: Tagalog; Manide

Capalonga, officially the Municipality of Capalonga (Tagalog: Bayan ng Capalonga), is a municipality in the province of Camarines Norte, Philippines. According to the 2024 census, it has a population of 32,800 people.

The town is a developing eco-tourism destination. Also known for its beaches, natural environment, and local culture.

== History ==
Agtas and Dumagats are believed to be the first inhabitants of the village which used to be called "Apalong". This name was derived from a wild plant called "Palong Manok", which looks like a rooster's comb. It is said that whenever the settlers of Apalong went to other places and asked where they came from, the usual reply was "We came from Kapalungan". Historians may comment that the natives were either referring to their place which has many "Palong" (roster's comb) or maybe they wanted identification for their settlement. Whatever it was, no record will show and no one at that time is still living, what is clearly known to Capalongueños is that this place was and still is an environment of flowers called Palong Manok. In 1572, the Spanish Conquistador Capt Juan de Salcedo and his men reached pacific shores and landed on Kapalongan settlement. Instead of finding gold, they found abundant wild beautiful red flowers that looked like roster's comb. The Spaniards built a church, formed a government, and the village was made a town and officially named Capalonga. The Spaniards for some years persisted on mining for gold at Sitio Maglagonlong, and the Spanish control was described to be brutal, harsh and full of harassment until they went away leaving behind imprints on the community's cultural heritage.

It is also believed that the first migrants of Capalonga came from the neighboring province of Tayabas (now Quezon). This is the reason that out of the twelve (12) municipalities of Camarines Norte, Capalonga has the highest rating and accent in speaking the Tagalog language. However, with the continuous migration process, mixed dialects has been produced. Today, like other places in the country, the dialects of the residents were enriched by various local medium of expression, thereby making no difference from the trend of other political units.

Without roads and being isolated from other towns by mountains, forest, rivers and sea, Capalonga remained relatively undeveloped by commerce and industry as late as the 1950s. In 1956, the road to Capalonga was opened. Still, growth had been slow until Martial law changed the pace. It was in the years 1987 to 1992 that all wooden and temporary bridges have been replaced by concrete bridges. Likewise, in the late part of 2003 up to the present, the paving of the Bagong Silang - Capalonga Road has started and existence of the air-conditioned van transport is now available as a result.

On June 21, 1969, ten barangays were excised from Capalonga to form the new municipality of Santa Elena by virtue of Republic Act No. 5480.

== Demographics ==
Population census of Capalonga
Year	Pop.	±% p.a.
1903	1,817	—
1918	2,311	+1.62%
1939	4,313	+3.02%
1948	5,318	+2.35%
1960	15,505	+9.33%
1970	17,891	+1.44%
1975	20,904	+3.17%
1980	21,718	+0.77%
1990	23,557	+0.82%
1995	25,336	+1.37%
2000	26,577	+1.03%
2007	29,683	+1.54%
2010	31,299	+1.95%
2015	32,215	+0.55%
2020	36,223	+2.50%
2024	32,800	−2.35%
Source: Philippine Statistics Authority

In the 2024 census, the population of Capalonga was 32,800 people, with a density of 110 inhabitants per square kilometre or 280 inhabitants per square mile.

== Geography ==
=== Barangays ===
Capalonga is politically subdivided into 22 barangays. Each barangay consists of puroks and some have sitios.

In 1955, the sitio of Ilayang Basiad was converted into the barrio of San Pedro.

- Alayao
- Binawangan
- Calabaca
- Camagsaan
- Catabaguangan
- Catioan
- Del Pilar
- Itok
- Lucbanan
- Mabini
- Mactang
- Mataque
- Old Camp
- Poblacion
- Magsaysay
- San Antonio
- San Isidro
- San Roque
- Tanauan
- Ubang
- Villa Aurora
- Villa Belen

=== Climate ===
Climate data for Capalonga, Camarines Norte
Month	Jan	Feb	Mar	Apr	May	Jun	Jul	Aug	Sep	Oct	Nov	Dec	Year
Mean daily maximum °C (°F)	26 (79)	27 (81)	29 (84)	31 (88)	31 (88)	30 (86)	29 (84)	29 (84)	29 (84)	29 (84)	28 (82)	27 (81)	29 (84)
Mean daily minimum °C (°F)	22 (72)	22 (72)	22 (72)	23 (73)	24 (75)	24 (75)	24 (75)	24 (75)	24 (75)	24 (75)	24 (75)	23 (73)	23 (74)
Average precipitation mm (inches)	51 (2.0)	35 (1.4)	37 (1.5)	39 (1.5)	91 (3.6)	131 (5.2)	168 (6.6)	132 (5.2)	162 (6.4)	184 (7.2)	166 (6.5)	101 (4.0)	1,297 (51.1)
Average rainy days	13.4	10.5	11.8	12.0	19.8	24.1	26.7	25.1	25.3	23.9	21.2	17.6	231.4
Source: Meteoblue (Use with caution: this is modeled/calculated data, not measured locally.)

== Economy ==
Poverty incidence of Capalonga (%)

Source: Philippine Statistics Authority

== Tourism ==
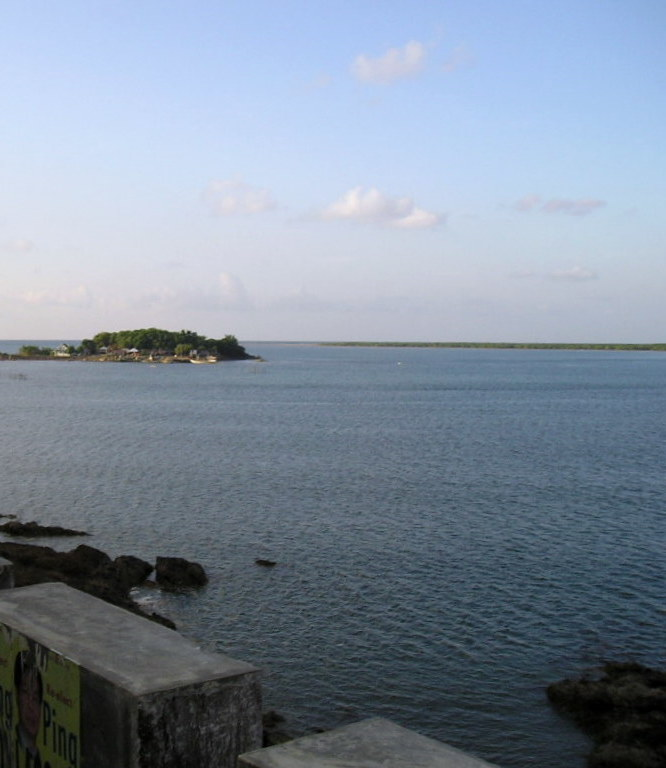
Capalonga coast

=== Natural attractions ===
- Guijanlo Island - Located at Barangay Camagsaan with a beautiful sandbar and white sand Beach.
- Boorey-Boorey Island - Located at Barangay San Roque with amazing Rock Formation
- Itok Falls - Located 4 km. west of the town with fresh and lush foliage and vegetation.
- Bangka-bangka Falls-Located at Barangay Alayao. It is being called as Bangka-bangka (Boat), because of its boat-like shape.
- Albino Beach-Located at sitio Talagpucao Barangay Catioan with relaxing smooth waves and fine sand.
- Mount Samat-Located at Barangay Alayao. This mountain is covered by the undiscovered species of ferns, orchids, etc. There are also falls with fresh cold clear water.
- Camagsaan Bridge- Located at Sabang bridge where it is a passage to the beauty of Tinago beach resort and Selfie Beach Resort
- Binawagan Beach - "Little Siargao of Capalonga" a long fine sand Beach located Barangay Binawangan along the newly opened National Highway Capalonga-Sta. Elena Road bound to Quezon Province and Manila.
- Camagsaan Beach - A fine sand beach located in Barangay Camagsaan. (Known resort - Selfie Beach Resort, Sulok Beach Resort and Tinago Beach Resort)
- Villa Aurora falls - Barangay Villa Aurora is blessed with so many falls. (Known Falls - Aurora Falls, Hagimit Falls and Bilat na bato)
- Capalonga Lighthouse - It is located coastal area of Barangay Poblacion. You can see here the large Mangrove reserve area in Capalonga.

=== Local festivals ===
- Feast of the Black Nazarene (May 13) - The town Fiesta in honor of the Black Nazarene draws devotees from all over the country. The image is said to be miraculous and its feast is particularly celebrated by Chinese businessmen, who pay annual homage and ask for long life and good fortune.
- Palong Festival (May 10–13) - Highlighted by colorful streetdancing and agro-industrial fair which expresses the local folks’ gratitude for their town's name's etymology, and signifies the abundant presence of "Palong Manok" (rooster's comb plant) available in the locality. Held also in celebration of the Black Nazarene's Feast Day on May 13 at the town of Capalonga.

== Education ==
The Capalonga Schools District Office governs all educational institutions within the municipality. It oversees the management and operations of all private and public, from primary to secondary schools.

=== Primary and elementary schools ===
- Calabaca Academy
- Camacho Aler Elementary School
- Capalonga CS
- Capalonga SDA Multigrade School
- Casiano Florendo Elementary School
- Catalino Gonzales Elementary School
- Diezmo-Urena Elementary School
- Esturas-Nabata Elementary School
- Francisco V. Aler Elementary School
- Jueves-Talento Elementary School
- Lukbanan Elementary School
- Mabini Elementary School
- Marca-Murillo Elementary School
- Melquiades Caldit Elementary School
- Necio Olila Elementary School
- Peter Sawmill Elementary School
- Portugal Chavez Elementary School
- Potenciano Juego Elementary School
- San Roque Elementary School
- Sotero Mago Elementary School
- Talento-Roll Elementary School
- Torres-Talento Elementary School
- Villa Aurora Elementary School

=== Secondary schools ===
- Calabaca Integrated School
- Capalonga Institute
- Capalonga Parochial High School
- Delia Diezmo High School
- Gonzalo Aler National High School
- Magsaysay National High School
- San Antonio High School
- Victoria J. Tuacar National High School
