= Santa Elena, Camarines Norte =

Municipality in Camarines Norte, Philippines

Santa Elena
- Municipality
- Municipality of Santa Elena
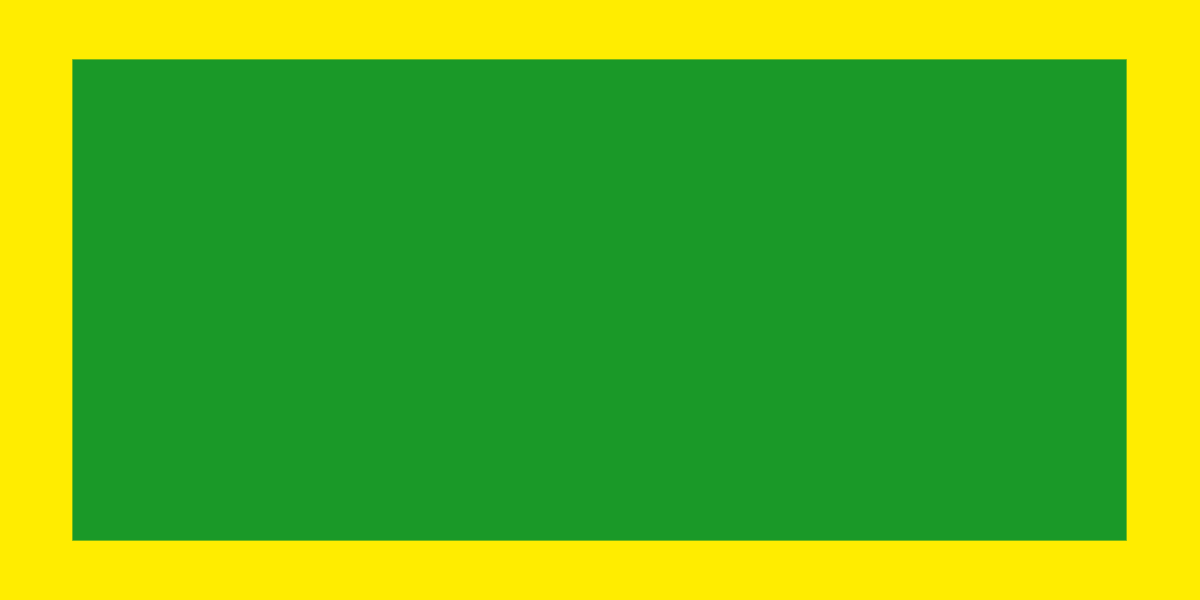
- Flag Seal
- Nickname: Gateway to Bicolandia
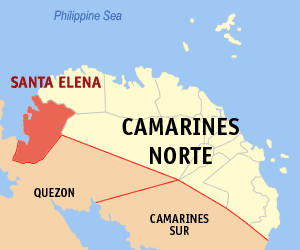
- Map of Camarines Norte with Santa Elena highlighted
- Interactive map of Santa Elena
- Location within the Philippines
- Coordinates: 14°10′47″N 122°23′31″E
- Country: Philippines
- Region: Bicol Region
- Province: Camarines Norte
- District: 1st district
- Founded: June 21, 1969
- Named for: Saint Helena
- Barangays: 19 (see Barangays)

Government
  - Type: Sangguniang Bayan
  - Mayor: Bernardina E. Borja
  - Vice Mayor: Ryan Jeffrey T. Mendoza
  - Representative: Josefina B. Tallado
  - Municipal Council: Members: Darwin I. Argarin; Howard Dom T. Mendoza; Cecilia M. Fermo; Cecilio P. Bactol; Ramil P. Lagamayo; Arnold C. Leynes; Myrna M. Sibulo; Edgardo N. de Guzman
  - Electorate: 28,229 voters (2025)

Area
  - Total: 199.35 km^{2} (76.97 sq mi)
- Elevation: 68 m (223 ft)
- Highest elevation: 530 m (1,740 ft)
- Lowest elevation: 0 m (0 ft)

Population (2024 census)
  - Total: 42,585
  - Density: 213.62/km^{2} (553.27/sq mi)
  - Households: 10,205

Economy
  - Income class: 1st municipal income class
  - Poverty incidence: 28.82% (2023)
  - Revenue: ₱ 216.8 million (2024)
  - Assets: ₱ 739.4 million (2024)
  - Expenditure: ₱ 172.5 million (2024)
  - Liabilities: ₱ 211.3 million (2024)

Service provider
  - Electricity: Camarines Norte Electric Cooperative (CANORECO); Quezon I Electric Cooperative (QUEZELCO I)
- Time zone: UTC+8 (PST)
- ZIP code: 4611
- PSGC: 0501610000
- IDD : area code: +63 (0)54
- Native languages: Tagalog; Manide

Santa Elena, officially the Municipality of Santa Elena (Tagalog: Bayan ng Santa Elena), is a municipality in the province of Camarines Norte, Philippines. According to the 2024 census, it has a population of 42,585 people.

== History ==
Santa Elena, formerly known as Ilayang Santol, was then a sitio of barrio Pulonguit-guit, Capalonga. In 1948, through the efforts of local leaders, it became an independent barrio.

Santa Elena became a municipality with ten barangays out of Capalonga by virtue of Republic Act No. 5480 on June 21, 1969.

=== Territorial dispute ===
1918 maps

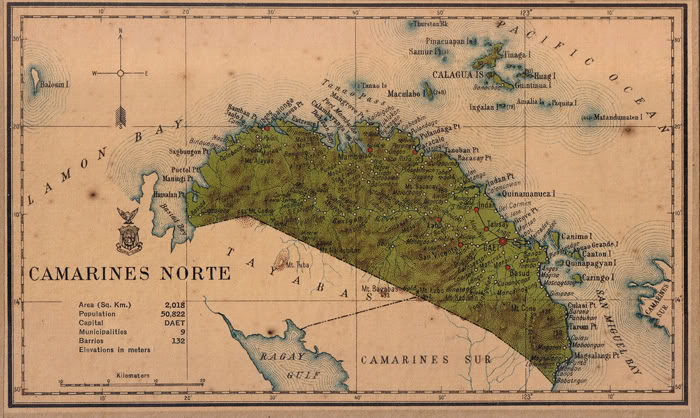
Map of Camarines Norte, which excluded the eight barangays disputed with Calauag, apart from Kagtalaba.

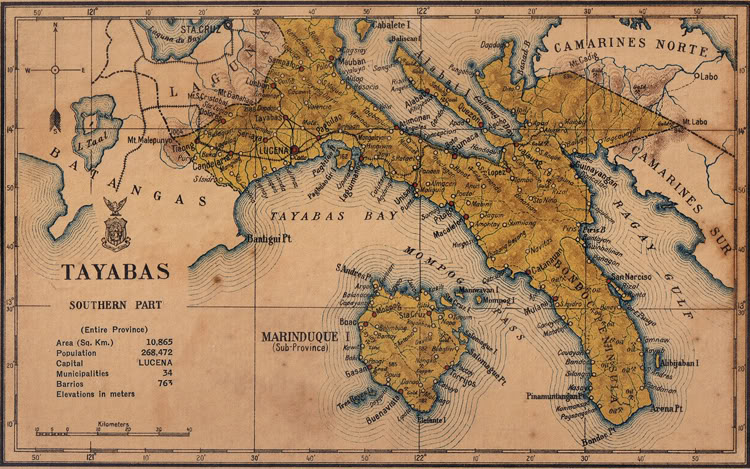
Map of southern Tayabas (now Quezon), which excluded the eight barangays disputed with Calauag.

Santa Elena and Calauag in Quezon province were involved in a decade-long boundary dispute, leading to a Supreme Court case and presidential intervention. The dispute involved nine barangays: Don Tomas, Guitol, Kabuluan, Kagtalaba, Maulawin, Plaridel, Patag Ibaba, Patag Iraya, and Tabugon. In 1991, the Provincial Government of Quezon and Municipal Government of Calauag ordered the demolition of a boundary marker installed by the Department of Environment and Natural Resources. In 1995, President Fidel V. Ramos intervened during his visit to Calauag, initially allowing Calauag to retain jurisdiction. However, the Supreme Court ultimately ruled in favor of Camarines Norte, transferring these barangays from Calauag's jurisdiction.

== Geography ==
Santa Elena is 80 kilometers (50 mi) from Daet and 262 kilometers (163 mi) from Manila.

=== Barangays ===
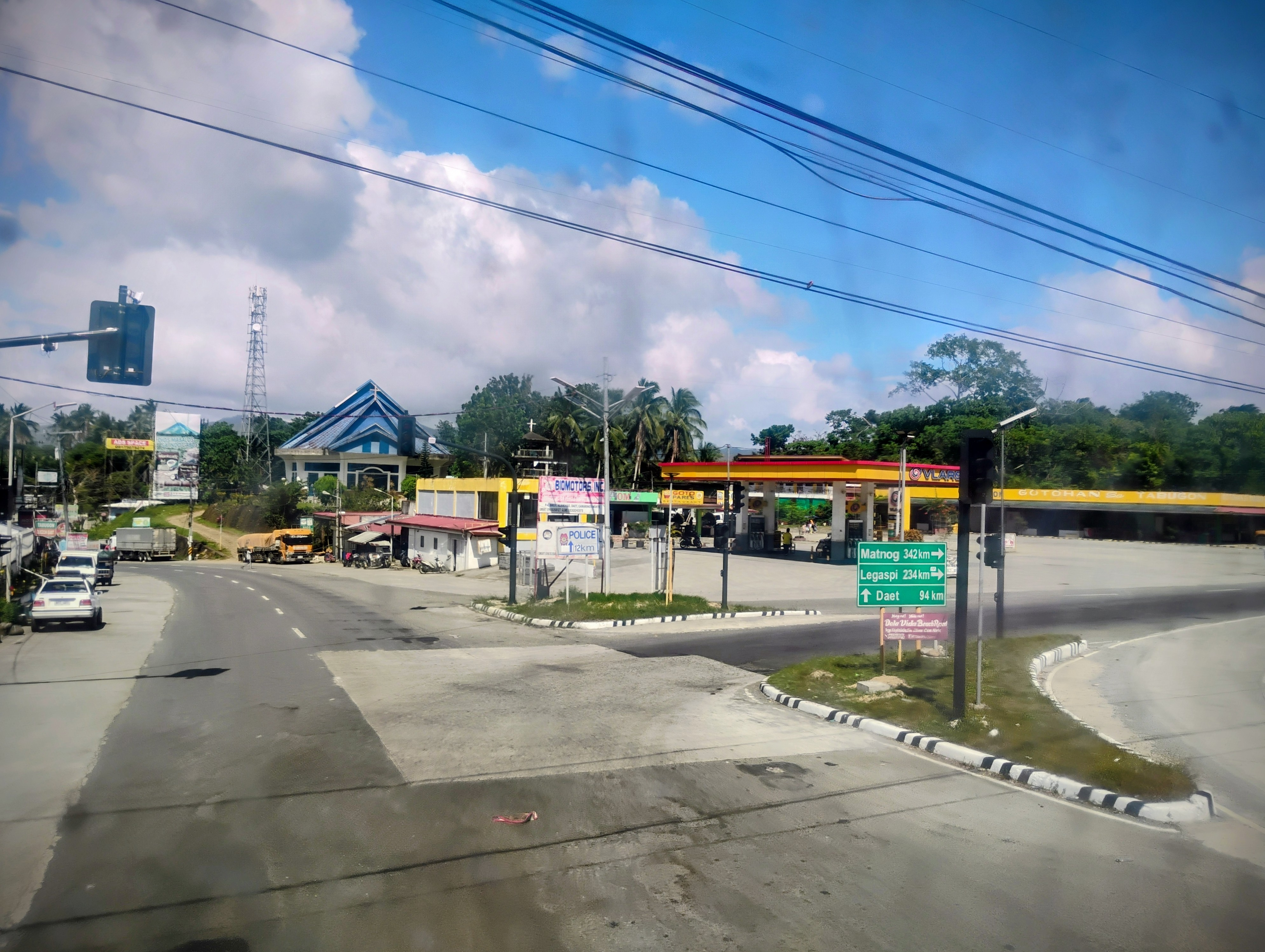
Tabugon Junction

Santa Elena is politically subdivided into 19 barangays. Each barangay consists of puroks and some have sitios.

- Basiad
- Bulala
- Don Tomas
- Guitol
- Kabuluan
- Kagtalaba
- Maulawin
- Patag Ibaba
- Patag Ilaya
- Plaridel
- Polungguitguit
- Rizal
- Salvacion
- San Lorenzo
- San Pedro
- San Vicente
- Santa Elena (Poblacion)
- Tabugon
- Villa San Isidro

=== Climate ===
Climate data for Santa Elena, Camarines Norte
Month	Jan	Feb	Mar	Apr	May	Jun	Jul	Aug	Sep	Oct	Nov	Dec	Year
Mean daily maximum °C (°F)	26 (79)	27 (81)	29 (84)	31 (88)	31 (88)	30 (86)	29 (84)	29 (84)	29 (84)	29 (84)	28 (82)	27 (81)	29 (84)
Mean daily minimum °C (°F)	22 (72)	22 (72)	22 (72)	23 (73)	24 (75)	24 (75)	24 (75)	24 (75)	24 (75)	24 (75)	24 (75)	23 (73)	23 (74)
Average precipitation mm (inches)	51 (2.0)	35 (1.4)	37 (1.5)	39 (1.5)	91 (3.6)	131 (5.2)	168 (6.6)	132 (5.2)	162 (6.4)	184 (7.2)	166 (6.5)	101 (4.0)	1,297 (51.1)
Average rainy days	13.4	10.5	11.8	12.0	19.8	24.1	26.7	25.1	25.3	23.9	21.2	17.6	231.4
Source: Meteoblue

== Demographics ==
Population census of Santa Elena
Year	Pop.	±% p.a.
1970	8,608	—
1975	10,841	+4.73%
1980	13,092	+3.84%
1990	20,105	+4.38%
1995	33,955	+10.32%
2000	37,878	+2.37%
2007	40,300	+0.86%
2010	40,828	+0.47%
2015	40,786	−0.02%
2020	43,582	+1.41%
2024	42,585	−0.55%
Source: Philippine Statistics Authority

In the 2024 census, the population of Santa Elena was 42,585 people with a density of 210 inhabitants per square kilometre or 540 inhabitants per square mile.

== Economy ==
Poverty incidence of Santa Elena (%)

Source: Philippine Statistics Authority

== Education ==
The Santa Elena Schools District Office governs all educational institutions within the municipality. It oversees the management and operations of all private and public, from primary to secondary schools.

=== Primary and elementary schools ===
- Basiad Elementary School
- Bulala Elementary School
- Don Tomas Elementary School
- Dygico Elementary School
- Earth's Bounty Elementary School
- Guitol Elementary School
- Juan A. Amparo Elementary School
- Kagtalaba Elementary School
- M. Hebrado Elementary School
- Maria Aurora Academy
- Maulawin Elementary School
- Patag Ibaba Elementary School
- Patag Ilaya Elementary School
- Pulongguit-Guit Elementary School
- R. Oquindo Elementary School
- Rizal Elementary School
- Salvacion Elementary School
- San Pedro Elementary School
- Sta. Elena Adventist Elementary School
- Sta. Elena Parochial School
- Tabugon Elementary School
- Villa San Isidro Elementary School

=== Secondary schools ===
- Bulala High School
- E.P. Borja High School
- Leocadio Alejo Entienza High School
- Lyceum of St. Dominic
- Maulawin National High School
- Rizal National High School
- San Pedro - Domingo Llarena High School
- Sta. Elena Integrated School

=== Higher educational institutions ===
- Sta. Elena Adventist Academy
- Sta. Elena College
- Sta. Elena Institute of Science & Technology
- Southern Tagalog Rural High School
