= Daet =

Capital of Camarines Norte, Philippines

- Municipality
- Municipality of Daet
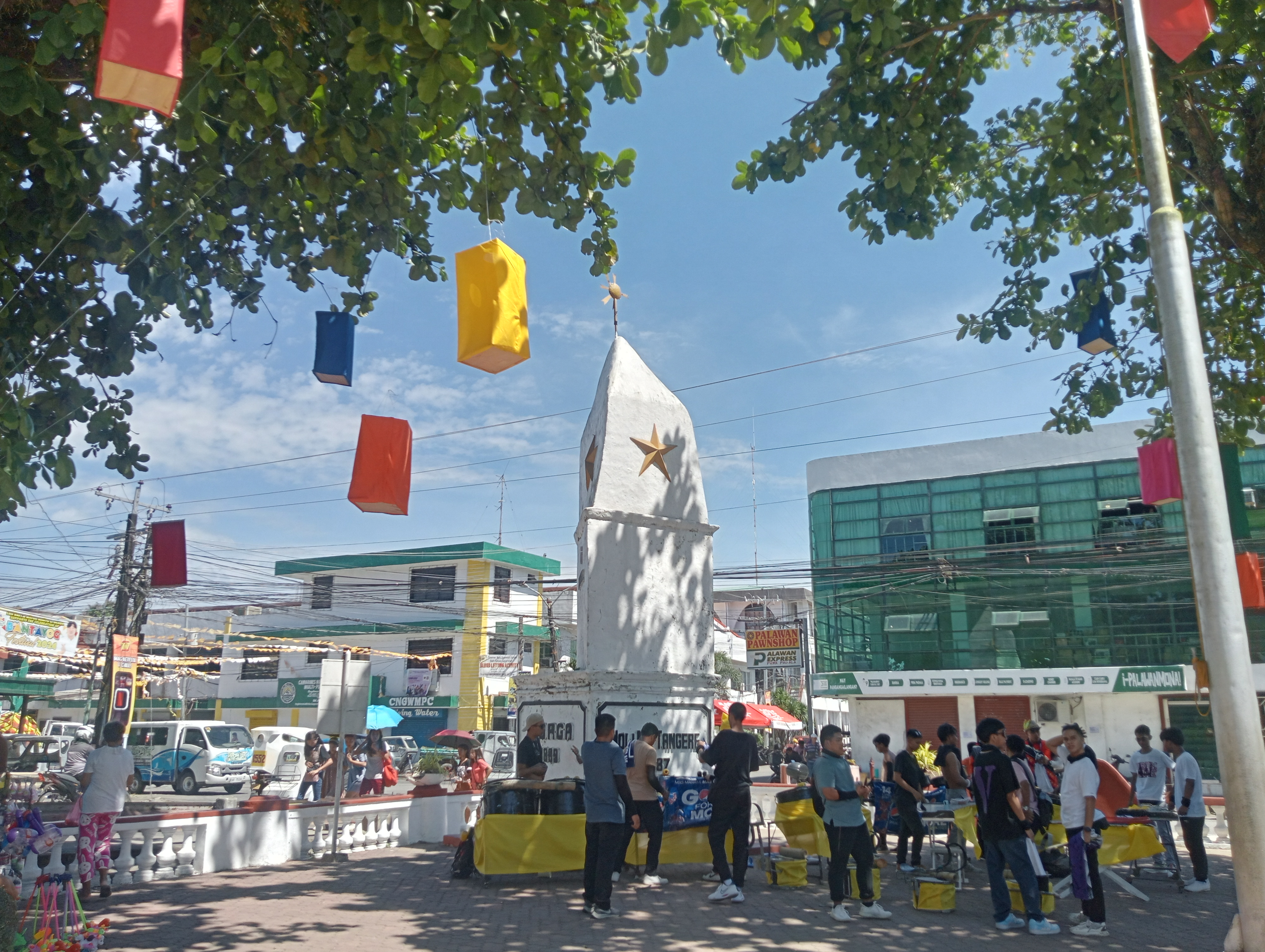
- First Rizal Monument at Daet in 2024

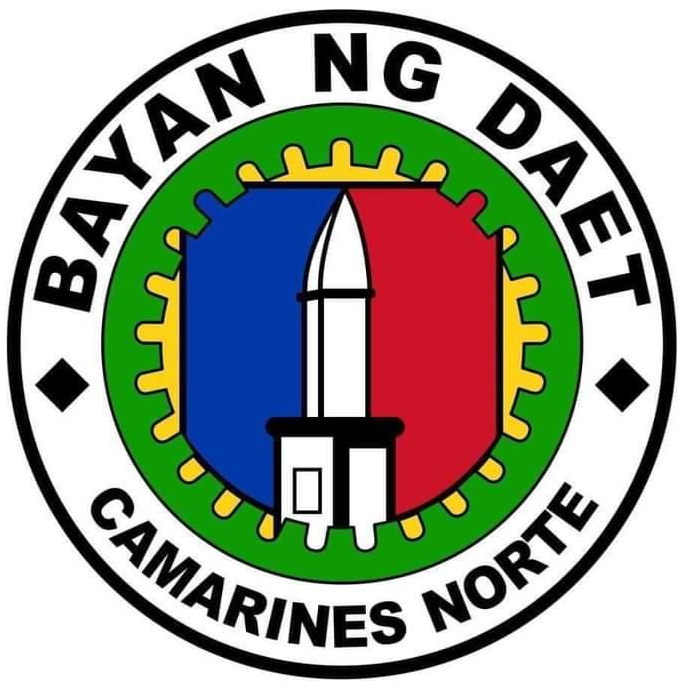
- Flag Seal
- Nickname: Gateway to Bicolandia
- Motto: Bayan tungo sa Kaunlaran!
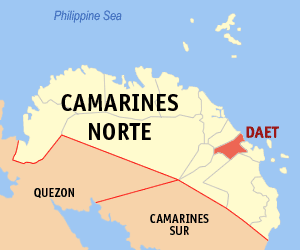
- Map of Camarines Norte with Daet highlighted
- Interactive map of Daet
- Location within the Philippines
- Coordinates: 14°06′51″N 122°57′23″E
- Country: Philippines
- Region: Bicol Region
- Province: Camarines Norte
- District: 2nd district
- Founded: 1583
- Barangays: 25 (see Barangays)

Government
  - Type: Sangguniang Bayan
  - Mayor: Ronie Valencia, (Aksyon)
  - Vice Mayor: Benito Ochoa, (NPC)
  - Representative: Rosemarie C. Panotes, (Lakas)
  - Municipal Council: Members: Iyah Carranceja, (PFP); Luhay Urbano, (PFP); Marlon T. Bandelaria, (PFP); Jonjon Coreses, (PFP); Ian Mhar Tejada, (NPC); Rosa Mia King, (NPC); Bong Avila, (PFP); Ontoy Timoner, (Aksyon)
  - Electorate: 65,566 voters (2025)

Area
  - Total: 46.00 km^{2} (17.76 sq mi)
- Elevation: 9.0 m (29.5 ft)
- Highest elevation: 48 m (157 ft)
- Lowest elevation: −2 m (−6.6 ft)

Population (2024 census)
  - Total: 106,465
  - Density: 2,314/km^{2} (5,994/sq mi)
  - Households: 25,413

Economy
  - Income class: 1st municipal income class
  - Poverty incidence: 12.78% (2023)
  - Revenue: ₱ 506.2 million (2024)
  - Assets: ₱ 937.1 million (2024)
  - Expenditure: ₱ 391.6 million (2024)
  - Liabilities: ₱ 178.7 million (2024)

Service provider
  - Electricity: Camarines Norte Electric Cooperative (CANORECO)
- Time zone: UTC+8 (PST)
- ZIP code: 4600
- PSGC: 0501603000
- IDD : area code: +63 (0)54
- Native languages: Central Bikol; Tagalog
- Website: lgudaet.gov.ph

Daet (IPA: [daʔet]), officially the Municipality of Daet (Central Bikol: Banwaan kan Daet; Tagalog: Bayan ng Daet), is a municipality and capital of the province of Camarines Norte, Philippines. According to the 2024 census, it has a population of 106,465 people, making it the second most populous in the province after Labo.

The municipality is a popular surfing spot among surfers worldwide. It is also home to the annual Daet International Aerosports Show which was first held in 2013. It is also known for its pili nuts, used in many local snacks and treats. Popular products include pili tarts, pili rolls, pili ice cream, crispy pili, and pili candies.

== Etymology ==
The name Daet was derived from the Bikol word dai-daitan which means, close to each other. Daet also originated from ancient Bicol term daet which, according to the first Bicol Spanish Dictionary Vocabulario de la Lengua Bicol, would mean "to make friend" or "to be reconciled".

== History ==
=== Pre-colonial period ===
Daet was already an old community even before the discovery of the Philippines by Magellan in 1521. An ancient tomb unearthed in the Bicol region revealed references described in the Panayam manuscripts known to oriental history as corresponding to the first half of the thirteenth century. The early settlers were believed to be direct descendants of the group of datus who escaped from the court of Brunei to evade the enmity of a ruling rajah.

=== Spanish colonial period ===
In 1571, Juan de Salcedo, a Spanish conquistador arrived in the Bicol Region during an expedition in search of gold, particularly in the mountains of Camarines. He found Daet to be an already established and thriving settlement, with houses clustered together for safety and protection. In June 1583, the Franciscan Order confirmed the establishment of several doctrinas or mission settlements, including Daet.

Salcedo’s expedition marked the start of over 300 years of Spanish rule, combining religious conversion and colonial administration. In the early colonial period, Don Manuel de la Estrada, Marquis de Camarines, was exiled to the Philippines following a scandal in Spain. Settling in Daet, he oversaw the construction of key structures, including a church, stone bridges, and civic buildings. He also introduced abaca cultivation, which later became a key industry for the Philippines. The 1818 census showed the area had 1,449 native families and 26 Spanish-Filipino families.

During the Spanish period, Daet occasionally suffered from raids by Moro pirates, prompting the fortification of nearby communities such as Mercedes, which later became an independent municipality in 1948. At the time, Daet served as the capital of the District of Daet, which encompassed the territory now known as Camarines Norte. In 1908, the barrio of Basud was separated from Daet to form its own municipality.

In the final years of Spanish colonial rule, Daet became a center of resistance. Thirteen residents were executed by Spanish authorities during Holy Week in April 1898 for their involvement in revolutionary activities. These individuals are remembered as martyrs in local history. Before the end of Spanish rule, Filipino insurgents in Daet managed to besiege the local Spanish garrison.

=== American colonial period ===
The Philippine–American War had a minimal impact on this town. American forces arrived unopposed on March 4, 1900, while most of the rest of the Bicol Region had already been subdued by Major Thomas McNamee, operating under the overall command of General John C. Bates. This period laid the foundation for the present-day progress of the current generation.

=== Martial law ===
On the evening of September 23, 1972, President Ferdinand Marcos announced on television that he had placed the Philippines, including Daet, under martial law. The marked the beginning of a 14-year period of one-man rule. Even though Martial Law was formally lifted on January 17, 1981, Marcos retained essentially all of his powers as dictator until he was deposed by the February 1986 People Power revolution.

On June 14, 1982 Marcos administration forces opened fire on protesters from different barrios, who were marching to demand an increase in copra prices, and to denounce "fake elections" and Cocofed. The government forces who fired on the protesters were led by a certain Capt. Malilay." Four people died on the spot, and at least 50 were injured. Two of those who were seriously wounded died two months later. This has come to be known as the "1981 Daet massacre," and four of those killed have since been honored by having their names engraved on the Wall of Remembrance at the Bantayog ng mga Bayani memorial.

=== Contemporary ===
The cityhood bid for the municipality began in 2011 headed by then Mayor Tito Sarion. Due to its size, petitions were made to expand it for the municipality to satisfy the requirements for cityhood.

== Geography ==
Daet is located in the southeastern part of Camarines Norte. It is bounded in the east by the town of Mercedes; in the south by the municipality of Basud; in southwest by San Lorenzo Ruiz town; in the north by Pacific Ocean; in the west by San Vicente and northwest by Talisay. The provincial capital covers a total land area of 5,861.48 hectares. The landscape of Daet is primarily composed of plains or flatlands, with no significant mountains or valleys. The average elevation of the area is approximately 10 meters above sea level.

It is 342 kilometres (213 mi) from the country's capital city of Manila.

=== Climate ===
Climate data for Daet, Camarines Norte (1991–2020, extremes 1920–2023)
Month	Jan	Feb	Mar	Apr	May	Jun	Jul	Aug	Sep	Oct	Nov	Dec	Year
Record high °C (°F)	32.8 (91.0)	34.3 (93.7)	34.9 (94.8)	36.0 (96.8)	37.2 (99.0)	37.0 (98.6)	36.5 (97.7)	36.7 (98.1)	37.9 (100.2)	35.4 (95.7)	35.6 (96.1)	36.0 (96.8)	37.2 (99.0)
Mean daily maximum °C (°F)	28.7 (83.7)	29.0 (84.2)	30.0 (86.0)	31.6 (88.9)	32.8 (91.0)	32.8 (91.0)	32.0 (89.6)	32.1 (89.8)	31.8 (89.2)	30.8 (87.4)	30.1 (86.2)	29.1 (84.4)	30.9 (87.6)
Daily mean °C (°F)	26.1 (79.0)	26.2 (79.2)	27.0 (80.6)	28.2 (82.8)	29.0 (84.2)	28.9 (84.0)	28.4 (83.1)	28.5 (83.3)	28.2 (82.8)	27.6 (81.7)	27.5 (81.5)	26.7 (80.1)	27.7 (81.9)
Mean daily minimum °C (°F)	23.6 (74.5)	23.3 (73.9)	24.0 (75.2)	24.9 (76.8)	25.3 (77.5)	25.1 (77.2)	24.8 (76.6)	24.9 (76.8)	24.5 (76.1)	24.4 (75.9)	24.8 (76.6)	24.3 (75.7)	24.5 (76.1)
Record low °C (°F)	17.1 (62.8)	15.1 (59.2)	17.3 (63.1)	16.3 (61.3)	19.8 (67.6)	20.6 (69.1)	20.8 (69.4)	19.8 (67.6)	16.3 (61.3)	18.2 (64.8)	17.8 (64.0)	15.8 (60.4)	15.1 (59.2)
Average rainfall mm (inches)	301.9 (11.89)	226.8 (8.93)	186.5 (7.34)	125.1 (4.93)	151.8 (5.98)	183.6 (7.23)	243.9 (9.60)	177.3 (6.98)	266.9 (10.51)	489.6 (19.28)	522.1 (20.56)	687.3 (27.06)	3,562.8 (140.27)
Average rainy days (≥ 1.0 mm)	19	13	12	8	10	12	15	12	15	21	23	23	183
Average relative humidity (%)	89	89	88	88	87	88	89	89	90	89	90	90	89
Source: PAGASA

=== Barangays ===
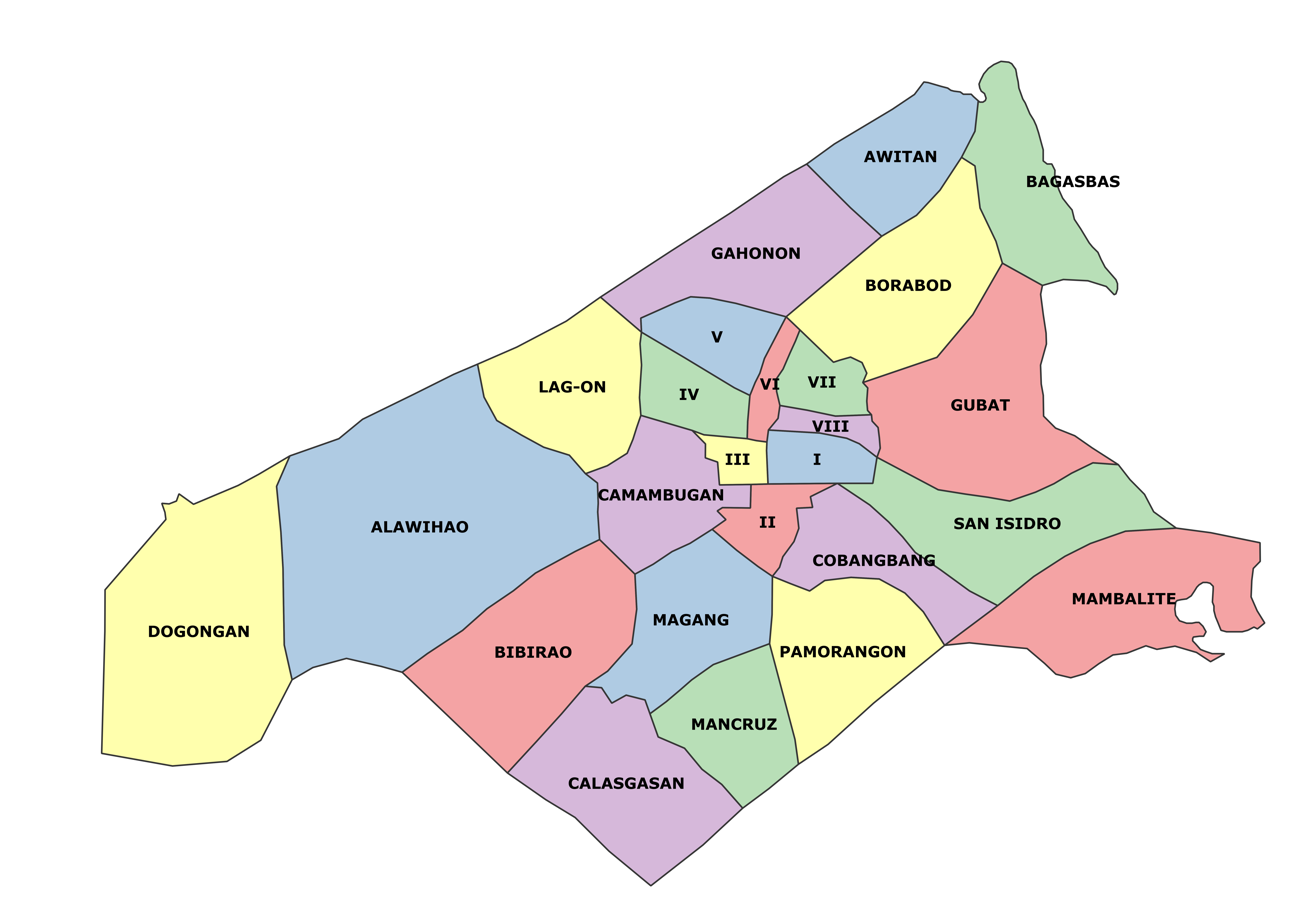
Barangay map of Daet

Daet is politically subdivided into 25 barangays. Each barangay consists of puroks and some have sitios. There are 7 central urban barangay units while only six peripherally located barangay units are considered urban. 12 of its barangay are currently rural.

Barangay	Population (2024)	Location	Number of Purok	Urbanization	Land Area	Chairman	District
Barangay 1	1,969	Central	8	Urban	16.26 ha	PB Elaine P. Madera	South District
Barangay 2 (Pasig)	2,416	Central	8	Rural	32.74 ha	PB Edwin Y. Ferrer, Jr.	South District
Barangay 3 (Bagumbayan)	1,489	Central	6	Urban	12.79 ha	PB Erlinda c. Turingan	South District
Barangay 4 (Mantagbac)	6,741	Central	9	Urban	33.07 ha	PB Sonia K. Bermas	North District
Barangay 5 (Pandan)	4,326	Central	7	Urban	37.55 ha	PB Pedro S. Musa	North District
Barangay 6 (Centro Occidental)	1,785	Central	5	Urban	12.50 ha	PB Arthur Z. Barrios	North District
Barangay 7 (Centro Oriental)	1,885	Central	7	Urban	30.75 ha	PB Botvinnik V. Mago	North District
Barangay 8 (Salcedo)	2,281	Central	10	Urban	13.32 ha	PB William R. Villarin	North District
Alawihao	11,191	Peripheral	10	Urban	389.30 ha	PB Robert E. Palencia	North District
Awitan	1,724	Peripheral	3	Rural	333.70 ha	PB Meliandro A. Eboña	North District
Bagasbas	5,623	Peripheral	6	Urban	348.00 ha	PB Illuminador R. Abordo, Jr.	North District
Bibirao	2,154	Peripheral	4	Rural	336.90 ha	PB Ramil E. Soriano	South District
Borabod (formerly known as Anghit)	3,697	Peripheral	6	Rural	331.40 ha	PB Rosito C. Panotes	North District
Calasgasan	4,383	Peripheral	6	Rural	884.30 ha	PB Estrella C. Sulpa	South District
Camambugan	9,953	Peripheral	7	Urban	238.00 ha	PB Irene D. Cambronero	South District
Cobangbang (formerly known as Carumpit)	3,903	Peripheral	8	Rural	130.30 ha	PB Paz M. Pacao	South District
Dogongan	4,580	Peripheral	6	Rural	506.20 ha	PB Zenaida M. Echano	South District
Gahonon	3,380	Peripheral	6	Rural	210.80 ha	PB William Carlo P. Avila	North District
Gubat (3 Districts – Moreno, Gubat, & Mandulongan)	6,517	Peripheral	5	Urban	288.80 ha	PB Nestor A. Vasquez	North District
Lag-on	6,301	Peripheral	7	Urban	291.20 ha	PB Franco V. Sarion	North District
Magang	6,184	Peripheral	6	Urban	170.50 ha	PB Eduardo C. Asiao	South District
Mambalite	2,449	Peripheral	7	Rural	452.60 ha	PB Michelle B. Ocan	South District
Mancruz	4,874	Peripheral	4	Rural	139.30 ha	PB Ernesto S. Teodoro	South District
Pamorangon	2,750	Peripheral	6	Rural	389.40 ha	PB Nicanor B. Paliza	South District
San Isidro (formerly known as Badas)	3,910	Peripheral	6	Rural	271.80 ha	PB Samuel L. Zaldua	South District

== Demographics ==
Population census of Daet
Year	Pop.	±% p.a.
1903	13,423	—
1918	14,413	+0.48%
1939	20,066	+1.59%
1948	19,880	−0.10%
1960	35,434	+4.93%
1970	50,620	+3.63%
1975	50,010	−0.24%
1980	54,789	+1.84%
1990	66,477	+1.95%
1995	74,341	+2.12%
2000	80,632	+1.76%
2007	94,184	+2.17%
2010	95,572	+0.53%
2015	104,799	+1.77%
2020	111,700	+1.35%
2024	106,465	−1.15%
Source: Philippine Statistics Authority

In the 2024 census, the population of Daet was 106,465 people, with a density of 2,300 inhabitants per square kilometre or 6,000 inhabitants per square mile.

== Economy ==
Poverty incidence of Daet (%)

Source: Philippine Statistics Authority

=== Natural Resources ===
The municipality is rich in mineral resources such as diatomaceous earth (DE) or commonly called white clay. This is one of the income generating industries of the municipality. This non-metallic mineral has a total approximate reserve of 1,289,600 metric tons.

The municipality also has a viable source of sand and gravel. It is being extracted by mining concessionaires.

=== Banking and Finance ===
As the center of commercial activities and trade in Camarines Norte, the capital sustains major commercial bank and savings bank in the province to provide its population ease in accessibility of financing and convenience in business.

Bank Name	Branch Name	Location	Barangay	Banking Hours	Phone Number
BDO Unibank, Inc.	BDO Camarines Norte - Daet	J. Lukban St. corner Moreno St.	Barangay VI	Monday - Saturday 08:30 AM - 05:30 PM	(054) 721-4300, (054) 440-2499, (054) 571-2956, (02) 429-0034
BDO Unibank, Inc.	BDO SM City Daet	G/F, SM City Daet, Vinzons Avenue, Purok 1	Barangay Lag-on	Monday - Saturday 10:00 AM - 07:00 PM	(054) 885-2964, (054) 885-2957
BDO Unibank, Inc.	BDO SM Hypermarket Daet	G/F, SM Hypermarket Daet, Vinzons Avenue	Barangay IV	Monday - Saturday 09:30 AM - 06:30 PM	(054) 605-0170, (054) 605-0171, (054) 440-1479, (054) 440-8320
Landbank of the Philippines	Landbank Daet Branch	Landbank Building, Vinzons Avenue	Barangay V	Monday - Friday 08:30 AM - 03:00 PM	(054) 885-2710; (0927) 424-8522; (0961) 551-8334
Landbank of the Philippines	Landbank Daet F. Pimentel Branch	UCPB Building, F. Pimentel Avenue	Barangay VIII	Monday - Friday 08:30 AM - 03:00 PM	(02) 8429-0035
Philippine National Bank	PNB Daet F. Pimentel	F. Pimentel Ave., corner Dasmariñas St.	Barangay VIII	Monday - Friday 09:00 AM - 04:00 PM	(054) 571-2951
Philippine National Bank	PNB Daet Carlos II	Carlos II Road	Barangay III	Monday - Friday 09:00 AM - 04:00 PM	(054) 721-2480
Bank of the Philippine Islands (BPI)	BPI Daet	Vinzons Avenue	Barangay Gahonon	Monday - Friday 09:00 AM - 04:30 PM	(+6354) 721-1448
BDO Network Bank	BDO Network Bank Daet	Ong Bldg., Bagasbas Road, Purok 2	Barangay VI	Monday - Saturday 08:30 AM - 05:00 PM	(054) 605 0420, (082) 233 7700
Metrobank	Metrobank Daet Branch	Vinzons Avenue	Barangay IV	Monday - Friday 09:00 AM - 04:00 PM	(054) 721 1676
PSBank	PSBank Daet	G/F New Building, F. Pimentel Avenue corner Vicente Basit Street	Barangay VIII	Monday - Friday 08:30 AM - 04:00 PM	(+6354) 440-5692, (054) 885-1151
Development Bank of the Philippines	DBP Daet	DBP Bldg., Magallanes Iraya St.	Barangay III	Monday - Friday 08:00 AM - 05:00 PM	(6354) 440-0762, (6354) 440-0757, (6354) 571-2500
Chinabank	Chinabank Daet	Vinzons Avenue	Barangay V	Monday - Friday 09:00 AM - 05:00 PM	(054) 440-0066
RCBC	RCBC Daet	Guinto Building, Froilan Pimentel Avenue	Barangay VI	Monday - Friday 09:00 AM - 04:00 PM	(054) 440 0161
Security Bank	Security Bank Daet	Justo Lukban Street	Barangay IV	Monday - Friday 09:00 AM - 04:30 PM	09171173353, 09989682497, (054) 885-3429, (054) 887-5358

=== Business Districts ===
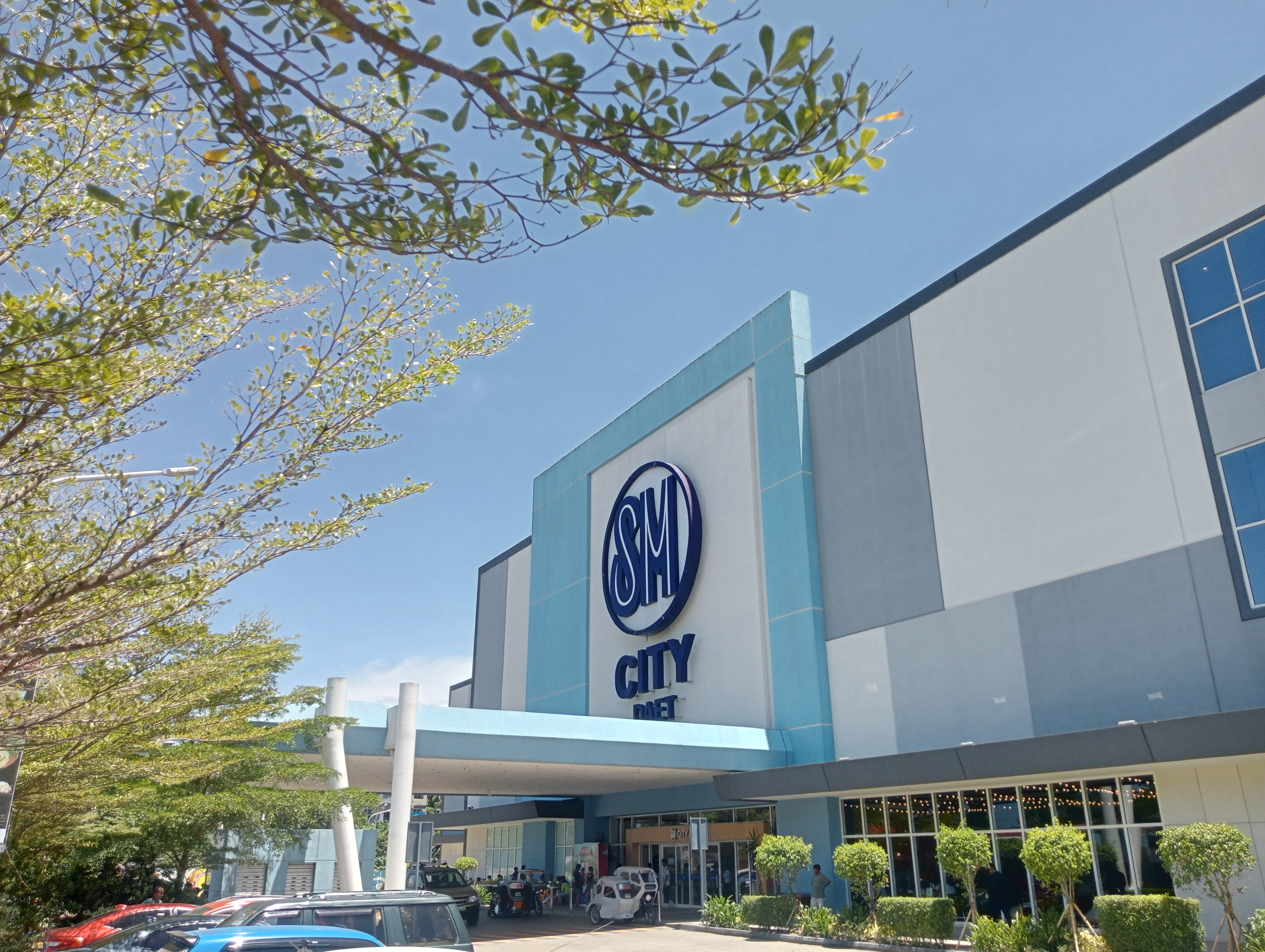
SM City Daet

Emulating the city planning and zone development of Naga City as one of its primary market catchment, the local government of Daet intends to maintain its central area for commercial activities and public events in the convergence of its primary roads where the boundaries of Barangay 5, Barangay 6, Barangay 4, and Barangay 8 meet.

Another central business district in development is located along the four-lane national road in barangay Lag-on where SM City Daet is situated in front of the central bus terminal near a local college foundation and a road going to the Cathedral of Daet.

== Government ==
Daet as a local government unit is headed by a mayor, vice mayor, and ten councilors. It has administrative and territorial jurisdiction over its 25 component barangay units, each with their own chairman or Punong Barangay as local government chief. The current municipal mayor of Daet is Hon. Ronnie Valencia.

=== Public Safety and Order ===
Daet is one of the peaceful towns in the Bicol Region. Criminality and juvenile delinquency are minimal in spite of the fact that it is the urban center of the Province of Camarines Norte. The average monthly crime rate for the period January to December 2018 is 53.35%.

The Philippine National Police (PNP) of the Department of Interior and Local Government (DILG) provides the police service of Daet. The main police headquarter is located in barangay Dogongan. The Daet Police Station is located in barangay Pamorangon. Sub- stations are situated in Barangay Bagasbas, Barangay VI and in Barangay Camambugan at the Central Terminal Complex Compound. The Barangay Tanods of the twenty five (25) barangay augment the peace keeping force and help in the maintenance of peace and order in the area.

As of 2019, Daet had an actual police force of 91. Police force to population ratio is 1:1,235. The ideal police population ratio is 1:1000 or 1 police to 1000 population. It shows that there is a need to augment the police force to twenty one (21) more uniformed men to meet the standard requirement.

== Infrastructure ==
=== Transportation ===
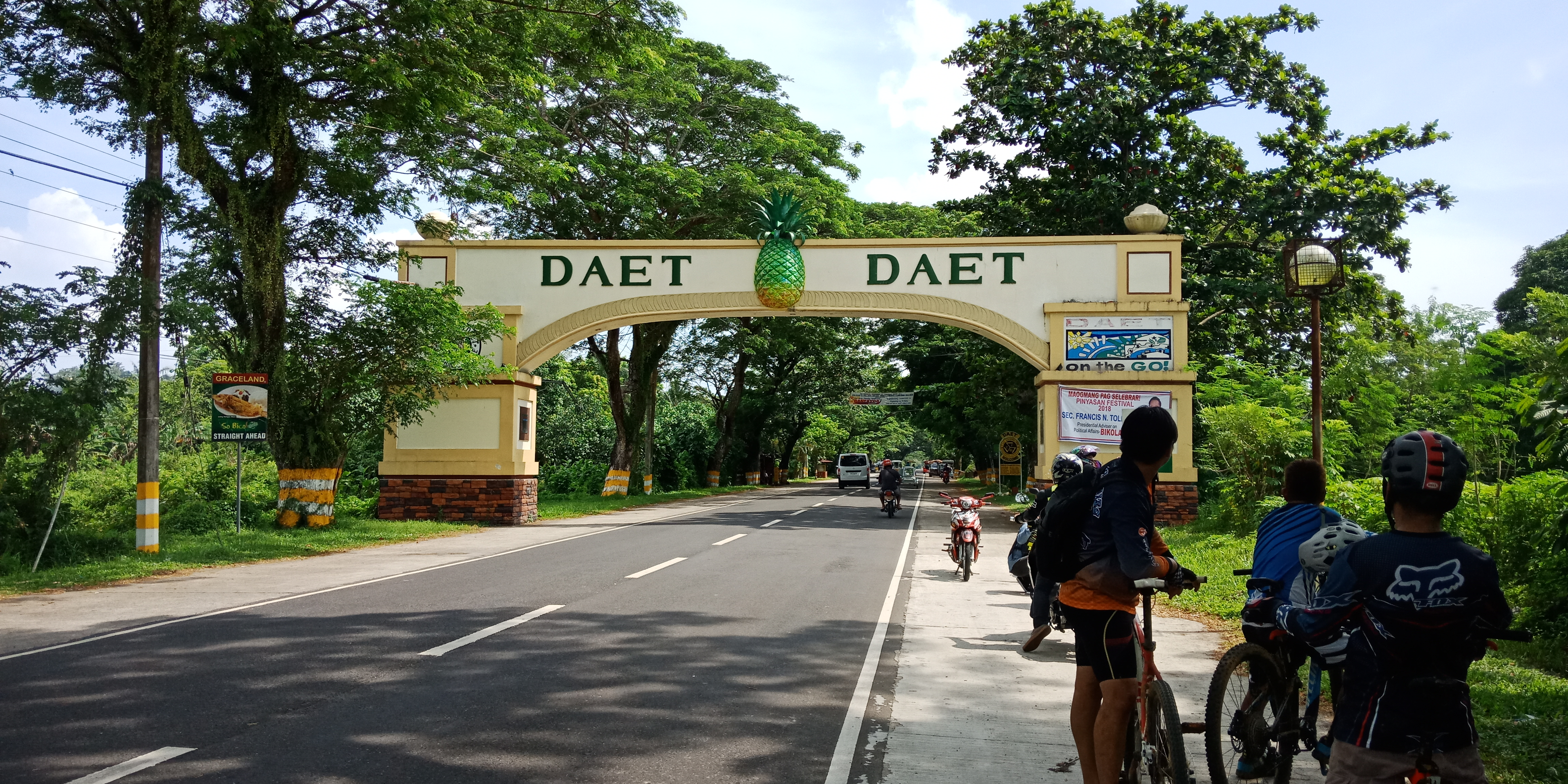
Daet's Welcome Arch (demolished in 2023)

Transportation in Daet is primarily managed by the Department of Transportation. Road and Air transportation are the only available modes of transportation in Daet. Road transportation is the primary mode of transportation.

The town is linked to other parts of the Philippines by Maharlika Highway (N621), which has a section in Daet with a total length of 25.50 kilometers, stretching from the boundary of the Municipality of Daet to the Municipality of Basud in Barangay Tuaca.

=== Primary Roads ===
Most of its major highway are four lane roads providing wider channel for variety of transport vehicles and cargo in and out the municipality.

- Froilan Pimentel Avenue - central avenue forming the primary junction of north and south district
- Governor Panotes Avenue - main thoroughfare linking the municipality of Mercedes to Daet
- Bagasbas Road - eastern highway connecting Gahonon, Borabod, and Bagasbas to the center of Daet
- Vinzons Avenue - links the diversion road to the central business districts of Daet
- Diversion Road - traverses Talisay from north through Lag-on and to south from Basud via Pamorangon
- Cory Aquino Boulevard - connects Mercedes, Daet, Talisay and Vinzons via a coastal road along Bagasbas

=== Water ===
The barangays of the municipality are served by Levels I, II, and III water supply systems. The Camarines Norte Water District (CNWD) and PrimeWater is the main water supplier in Daet. Additionally, some barangays and properties without coverage rely on water wells(shallow, deep or dug)

=== Energy ===
Daet is being served by electric power, formerly by the defunct Hidalgo Electric Enterprise, now by the National Power Corporation and National Grid Corporation of the Philippines (NGCP) through the Camarines Norte Electric Cooperative (CANORECO).

=== Communication ===
Telecommunications in Daet is managed by the National Telecommunications Commission. There are three satellites of Smart, Globe and DITO.

While postal mail services are run by the Philippine Postal Corporation. There is only one postal mail service office in Daet, which is located in Barangay Camambugan.

== Tourism ==
=== Surfing and beaches ===
Daet is a famous surfing and kiteboarding spot, as it has a long stretch of beach in Bagasbas. Because of the attention it has gotten from the local surfing community, the Philippine Department of Tourism turned it into a local accredited surfing spot.

Aside from being a spot for surfing and kiteboarding, the Calaguas group of islands, in the jurisdiction of Vinzons, to its north has garnered attention from local and foreign tourists alike. The islands can be considered virgin as no resorts have been created there yet.

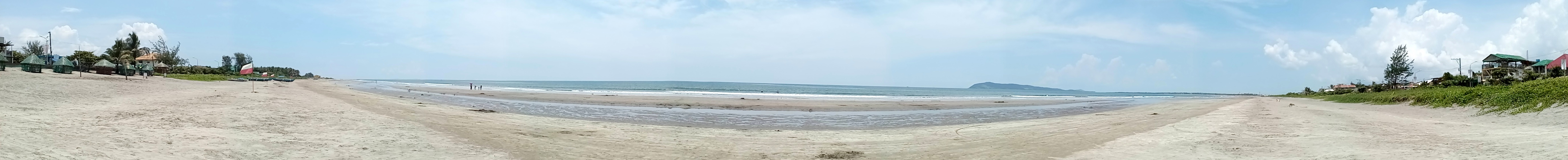
Panoramic view of Bagasbas Beach

=== Places of interest ===
- University of Camarines Norte - The first and only university in the province. It was converted into a university by the passage of Republic Act 11399.
- Central Plaza Mall (In Lag-On)
- Puregold Daet
- Bagasbas Beach
- Bagasbas Airport
- Daet Elevated Plaza
- SM Savemore Daet
- Cory Aquino Boulevard, the longest boulevard in the Philippines.
- SM City Daet (located in Lag-on) - The 3rd SM mall in Bicol region and 77th mall of SM Supermalls in the Philippines

==== Churches ====
- Most Holy Trinity Cathedral, it was built and was inaugurated in 1984. It is also the cathedral of the Diocese of Daet
- Parroquia de San Juan Bautista, established in 1611, it is one of the first church in Camarines Norte in the region built by the Franciscan Friars.
- IGLESIA NI CRISTO Lokal Ng Daet
- IGLESIA NI CRISTO Lokal Ng Borabod
- Saint Joseph, Husband of Mary Parish, in Lag-on
- Our Lady Of Peñafrancia Parish in Moreno
- Divine Mercy Parish in Alawihao

==== Historical landmarks ====
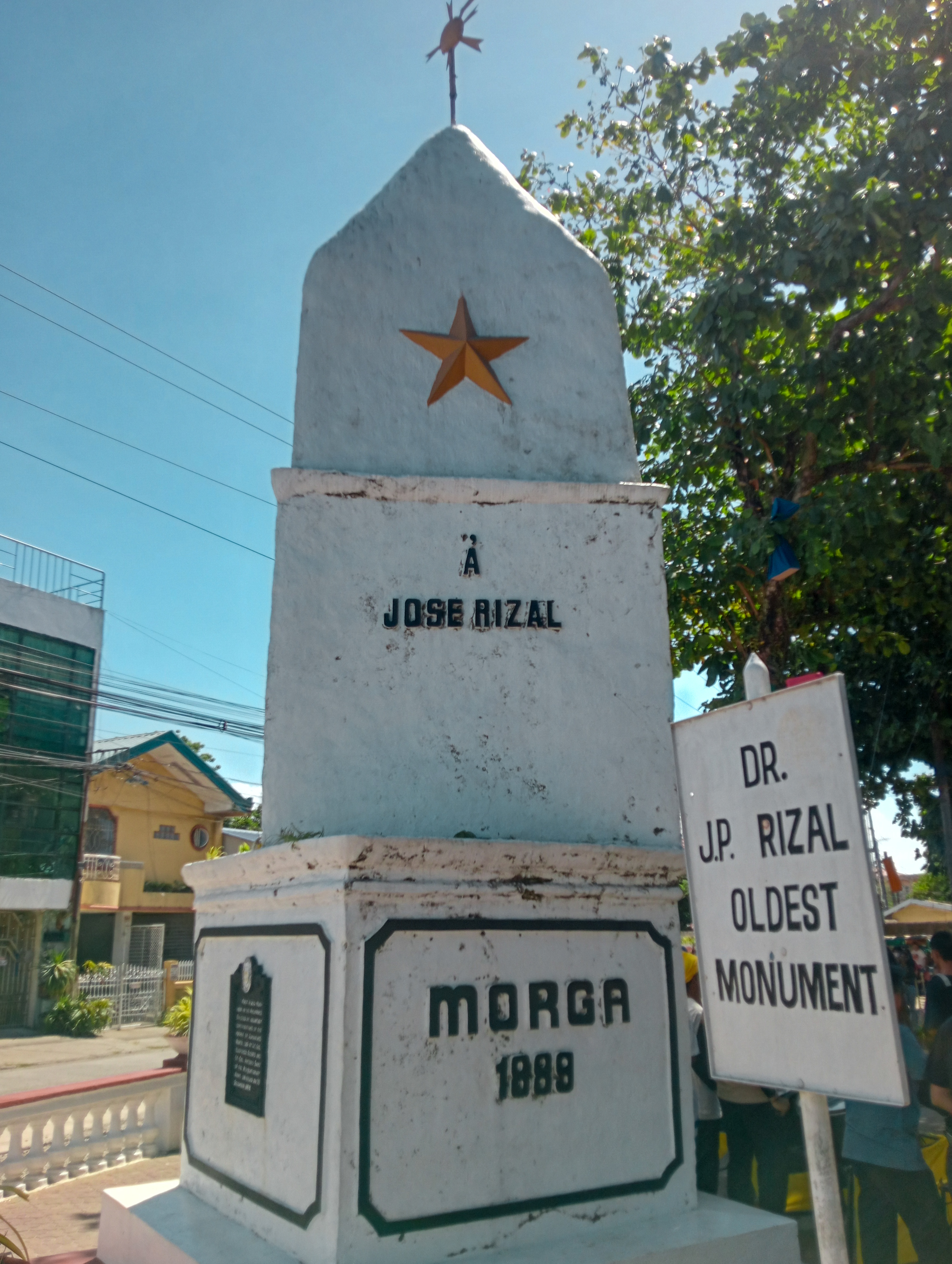
Daet is the home of the first monument for José Rizal.

- 1st Rizal Monument - The first monument in honor of a Filipino hero, Dr. Jose Rizal. Its foundation was made of mortars and boulders from the demolished old Spanish jail in Daet. Lt. Col. Antonio Sanz and Lt. Col. Ildefonso Alegre of Philippine Revolutionary Army initiated the construction of the monument which was unveiled on December 20, 1898.
- Provincial Capitol
- Old Daet Municipal Building
- Daet Elevated Town Plaza
- Daet Municipal Building
- President Cory Aquino Boulevard (Bagasbas Boulevard)
- Bagasbas Airport — located near the beach at barangay Bagasbas

== Culture ==
=== Festivals ===
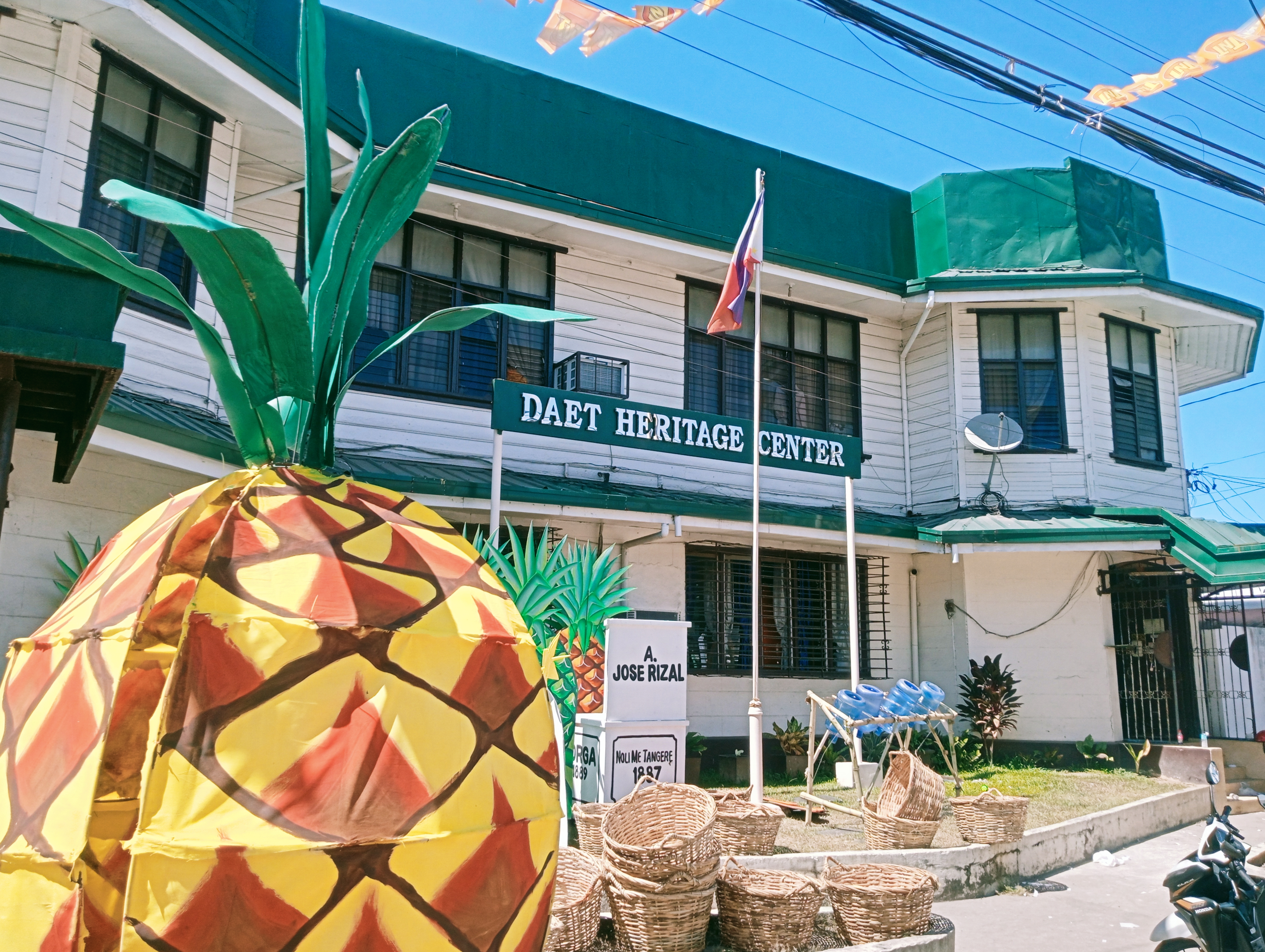
Daet Heritage Center

The Pineapple Festival (or "Pinyasan" as it is called by the locals) is considered to be the most colorful festivals in Camarines Norte. The festival started in 1992, and is about the province's prime agricultural product, which is the "Queen of All Pineapple" pineapple. Noted for its sweetness and flavor, this kind of pineapple is produced only in Camarines Norte, thereby making it a specialty in the province. The festival goes on for about 10 days, and several events are held in the municipality. The festival aims to promote the culture of Daet and its citizens. The Pineapple Festival is held every June 22–26 annually, initiated by Mayor Tito Sarte Sarion.

The Bantayog Festival celebrates the founding of Camarines Norte. As of 2025, it has been 107 years since the province has become independent, since March 10, 1917, when Ambos Camarines (At that time Camarines Norte and Camarines Sur were one province) was split from two. This festival promotes the province as one which has unnoticed potential in the fields of tourism and commerce, and also the rich culture and hospitality of the people of Camarines Norte. The Bantayog Festival is held every March or April annually. It was launched in April 1982.

== Education ==
=== Basic Education Schools ===
There are two schools district offices which govern all basic education institutions within the municipality. They oversee the management and operations of all private and public, from primary to secondary schools.

==== Daet North District schools ====
Private Schools
BEIS School ID	School Name	Location	Barangay	School Subclassification
402766	ACLC Daet Campus	2/F, Guinhawa Bldg., J. Lukban Street	Barangay VI	Nonsectarian
403633	Camarines Norte Chung Hua High School Foundation, Inc.	Zabala Street	Barangay IV	Nonsectarian
403639	Mabini Colleges, Inc.	Governor Panotes Avenue	Barangay VII	Nonsectarian
403640	New Eve Learning Center	2706, Fe Martinez St.	Barangay VII	Nonsectarian
403641	Our Lady of Lourdes College Foundation	Vinzons Avenue	Lag-on	Nonsectarian
403642	Our Lady of Peñafrancia College-Daet	Bagasbas Road	Borabod	Nonsectarian
403643	Dionedas Special School of Daet, Inc.	Baldovino St., Purok 4	Barangay V	Nonsectarian
403644	St. Luke Christian School & Learning Center	2450, Vinzons Avenue	Lag-on	Nonsectarian
406547	Northills College of Asia, Inc.	3/F Guerra Bldg., Gov. Panotes Ave.	Barangay VI	Nonsectarian
408869	The Ripple of Hope Skills and Technology Institute, Inc.	Vinzons Avenue	Bagasbas	Nonsectarian
409246	Asian Technological Skills Institute, Inc.	J. Lukban cor. MD, Camarines St.	Barangay III	Nonsectarian
409247	Vineyard Asia Technological College, Inc.	Diversion Road	Camambugan	Nonsectarian
410091	Hope Science and Technology College Corp.	St. Niño Commercial Center, Dasmariñas St.	Barangay VIII	Nonsectarian
433001	Daet SDA Multigrade School	Roseville 3 Subdivision	Gubat	Nonsectarian
433015	MCE Academy, Inc.	Bagasbas Road	Borabod	Nonsectarian
433020	Montessori Children's House of Learning	Purok 3	Gahonon	Nonsectarian
433023	Howard Montessori School	Suzara Street	Barangay VIII	Sectarian

Public Schools
BEIS School ID	School Name	Location	Barangay	School Subclassification
112130	A. Pabico Abordo Elementary School	Purok 2	Borabod	DepEd Managed
112131	Alawihao Elementary School	Purok 2	Alawihao	DepEd Managed
112132	Awitan Elementary School	Purok 3	Awitan	DepEd Managed
112133	Bagasbas Elementary School	Purok 1	Bagasbas	DepEd Managed
112134	Daet Integrated School (Daet Elementary School)	Governor Panotes Avenue	Barangay VII	DepEd Managed
112135	Dogongan Elementary School	Purok 3	Dogongan	DepEd Managed
112136	Mantagbac Elementary School	Purok 9	Barangay IV	DepEd Managed
112138	Pandan Elementary School	D. Cabanela Street	Barangay V	DepEd Managed
112139	UP Alawihao Resettlement Elementary School	Purok 10	Alawihao	DepEd Managed
112140	UP Teacher’s Village Elementary School	UP Phase II	Alawihao	DepEd Managed
173001	Don Emiliano L. Pabico Elementary School	Purok 2	Lag-on	DepEd Managed
173002	Julia Abilgos Elementary School	Sitio Mandulongan	Gubat	DepEd Managed
173018	Paciano A. Magana Elementary School	Purok 6	Gahonon	DepEd Managed
301924	Vicente L. Basit Memorial High School	Purok 1	Awitan	DepEd Managed
309612	Porfirio R. Ponayo High School		Mambalite	DepEd Managed
309613	Alawihao High School	Purok 6, UP Phase I	Alawihao	DepEd Managed
500030	Moreno Integrated School	Gov. Panotes Ave.	Barangay VIII	DepEd Managed

==== Daet South District schools ====
Private Schools
BEIS School ID	School Name	Location	Barangay	School Subclassification
403637	La Consolacion College of Daet, Inc.	Froilan Pimentel Avenue	Barangay I	Nonsectarian
403647	Today's Kids Learning Center	Ofelia Street	Barangay II	Nonsectarian
403649	Zion Christian Academy Foundation, Inc.	Purok 1	Calasgasan	Nonsectarian
407000	Microsystems College Foundation Inc.	Carlos II Street	Barangay III	Nonsectarian
407824	Lord's Heritage Christian Academy	Diversion Road	Camambugan	Sectarian
433002	Mary's Bright Montessori School	Purok 2	Cobangbang	Nonsectarian

Public Schools
BEIS School ID	School Name	Location	Barangay	School Subclassification
112141	Calasgasan Elementary School	Purok 4	Calasgasan	DepEd Managed
112142	Cobangbang Elementary School	Purok 2	Cobangbang	DepEd Managed
112143	San Luis Elementary School	Vivencio Street	Barangay II	DepEd Managed
112144	Don S. Carranceja Memorial School	Purok 3	Bibirao	DepEd Managed
112145	F. Baldovino Elementary School	Purok 2	Camambugan	DepEd Managed
112146	Goito Pimentel Elementary School		Mambalite	DepEd Managed
112147	Gregorio Pimentel Memorial School	National Highway	Pamorangon	DepEd Managed
112148	Zurbano Elementary School	Magallanes Ilaod St., Purok 8	Barangay I	DepEd Managed
173015	Mancruz Elementary School	Sampaguita Street	Mancruz	DepEd Managed
173019	Anita V. Romero Elementary School	Purok 6	Magang	DepEd Managed
309622	Camarines Norte National High School- Annex	Purok 2	Camambugan	DepEd Managed
301891	Camarines Norte High School		Barangay II	DepEd Managed
600054	CNSC	J. Lukban Extension	Barangay II	SUC Managed

=== Higher education institutions ===
Daet is home to known tertiary education institutions in the province serving most of the youth sector quality learning experience and competitive training.

- ACLC Daet Campus
- University of Camarines Norte
- La Consolacion College of Daet, Inc.
- Mabini Colleges
- Our Lady of Lourdes College Foundation
- Our Lady of Peñafrancia College - Daet

== Notable personalities ==
- Manuel Conde, National Artist of the Philippines for Film (2009)
- Ricky Lee, National Artist of the Philippines for Film and Broadcast Arts (2022)
- Robin Padilla, Actor
- Ambet Nabus, Radio Anchor, Comedian and Show Business Reporter
- Joross Gamboa, TV Actor
- Precious Paula Nicole, Drag Performer, Winner of Drag Race Philippines (Season 1)
