= Bagatao Island Lighthouse =

Historic lighthouse in Sorsogon, Philippines

- Location: Bagatao Island, Magallanes, Sorsogon, Philippines
- Coordinates: 12°49′56.1″N 123°47′30.2″E

Tower
- Constructed: 1904
- Foundation: concrete base
- Construction: steel tower
- Height: 8.8 metres (29 ft)
- Shape: cylindrical tower with balcony and lantern
- Markings: white tower, gray trimmings

Light
- First lit: 1904
- Focal height: 41.1 metres (135 ft)
- Lens: sixth order Fresnel lens (original), API FA-250 (current)
- Range: 17 nautical miles (31 km; 20 mi)
- Characteristic: Fl W 5s.

Bagatao Island Lighthouse is a historic lighthouse located on Bagatao Island on the eastern side of the entrance to Sorsogon Bay, in the province of Sorsogon in the Philippines. The 29-foot (8.8 m) white cylindrical iron tower is situated on the rocky headland that forms the southern point in the western end of the Island, giving the total light elevation of 135 feet (41 m). The light not only marks the entrance to the bay, but also assists ships in navigating the bend around Ticao Island of Masbate province as they head to San Bernardino Strait and exit to the Pacific Ocean.

Bagatao Island is under the jurisdiction of the municipality of Magallanes, Sorsogon. Barangays Biga and Behia which administer the island are two of the 34 barangays of the said municipality.

== History ==
Location of Bagatao Island Lighthouse in Sorsogon. The island, where the lighthouse is located, is at the mouth of Sorsogon Bay which opens to the Ticao Pass.

=== Spanish Period ===
A light on Bagatao Island was proposed, pre-1900, to assists ships in navigating Ticao Pass together with Capul Light at the entrance to San Bernardino Strait and Bugui Point Light in northern Masbate. The final approved plan, however, was decided to move its location from Bagatao to the San Miguel Island on the northern tip of Ticao Island, hence the construction fell through.

=== American period ===
A light station on Bagatao Island was one of the stations proposed by the Bureau of Lighthouse Construction for the fiscal year 1903–1904. The tower planned was one of the several iron lighthouse towers bought by Spain from France and was found by the Bureau at the warehouse of the old lighthouse commission after the turnover to the Americans. The tower though, had several minor pieces missing that required new ones to be made.

A working party was sent to the island to commence work on the light station in January 1904. The party consisted of two Americans, from 6 to 10 Chinese carpenters, and about 30 Filipino workmen hired in Manila on account of the difficulty of securing local laborers.

Temporary quarters were constructed for the workers and as well as storehouses. A pier of masonry was also built for landing supplies. A service road from the pier to the tower site was cleared and graded as the site for the permanent structures. Wells were dug in an attempt to obtain fresh water on the island.

The permanent work consisted of the erection of an iron tower, a frame dwelling for the keepers, a frame kitchen, a concrete storehouse and oil room, a cistern of concrete reinforced with steel, a frame latrine, a tripod for a port light, and the cutting of considerable hardwood lumber for use here and at other stations.

The tower, an iron cylinder 29 feet (8.8 m) high, was anchored to its concrete base on the summit rock by anchor bolts 1 meter long. The frame dwelling, measuring 38 feet 2 inches by 37 feet 6 inches, was supported on wooden posts set in concrete pillars.

The sixth-order flashing white light, equipped both with an incandescent and with an ordinary burner, was first lit on May 15, 1904. A red fixed-port light was also displayed on a tripod to the east of the flashing light.

The remaining work done by July and August consisted of finishing and painting the permanent buildings, removing temporary structures, and cutting timber for use at other stations, as the timber cut on the reservation cost less than the same quality of wood cost in Manila. After the station was completed, the party was brought back to Manila. The total cost of the lighthouse was ₱20,190.30.

== Current tower ==
The original lighthouse tower still exists but the lamp was recently replaced by a solar-powered modern lamp by the Philippine Coast Guard. All lighthouses in the Philippines are managed by the Philippine Coast Guard.

== See also ==
- List of lighthouses in the Philippines
