= List of lighthouses in the Philippines =

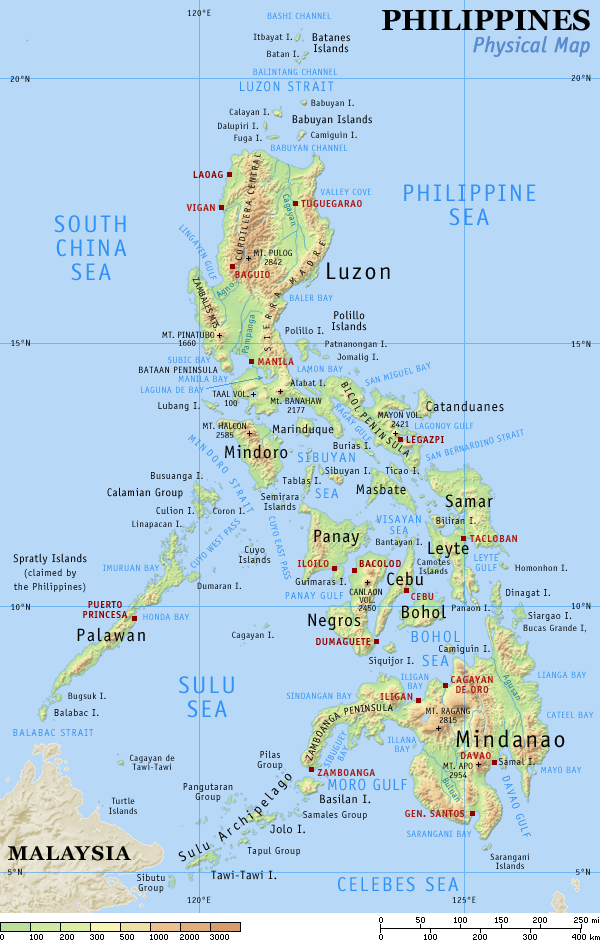
The Philippine Archipelago

As a country comprising over 7,100 islands packed in an area of 300,000 km^{2} (120,000 sq mi) and having the fifth-longest coastline in the world, the Philippine coast has a total length of 36,289 km (22,549 mi) and is very irregular, with numerous bays, gulfs, and islets. Eleven of the largest islands of the Philippine archipelago are the major islands and main centers of population, with ten of its most populous cities located along the coast; approximately 1,000 of the smaller islands are also populated. With more than 5,000 nautical miles (9,300 km) of coasting routes and tortuous channels regularly navigated by vessels trading among some 300 separate ports, navigation aids like lighthouses help mariners against misnavigation and guide them to safety and out of danger from grounding on its treacherous reef and shoals.

Large international ships rely on lighthouses to guide them safely out from the open sea and into Philippine waters. Once within Philippine waters, lighthouses help them maneuver through its narrow straits and channels, pointing out safe passages and leading vessels to their destination ports. Although there are electronic navigation systems, lighthouses are still important in warning seafarers of dangerous waters in case of failure of these electronic systems.

As an archipelago, the continuous development and prosperity of the country is linked to maritime travel. Even with the advent of aviation, the water routes continue to be the main highways for travel and commerce, with the lighthouses of the Philippines safely guiding the vessels that ply its routes.

== List of lighthouses in the Philippines ==
The following is a list of historical and notable lighthouses constructed in the Philippines.

Lighthouse	Image	Location	Province	First lit	Tower height	Focal plane	Current status	Description
Apo Reef Light		Apo Reef	Occidental Mindoro		33.5 m (110 ft)	35 m (115 ft)	Nonextant	Replaced with a new modern white tower.
Apo Reef lighthouse		Sablayan	Occidental Mindoro	1990s	110 ft (34 m)	115 ft (35 m)	Active	Good
Apunan Point lighthouse		Romblon	Romblon	1930	62 ft (19 m)	98 ft (30 m)	Active	Good
Bagacay Point Lighthouse		Catarman	Catarman	1874	21 ft (6.4 m)	46 ft (14 m)	In ruins	Partly in ruins but it is the oldest existing lighthouse tower in the Philippines.
Bagacay Point Lighthouse		Cebu	Cebu	1905, 1908	72 ft (22 m)	44 m (144 ft)	Active	Original lamp and lantern room were recently replaced.
Bagatao Island Lighthouse		Magallanes	Magallanes, Sorsogon	1904	29 ft (8.8 m)	135 ft (41 m)	Active	Original lamp was replaced with a solar-powered modern lamp.
Baliguian Island Light		Baliguian Island	Iloilo	1916	66 ft (20 m)	75 ft (23 m)	Active	Unknown, as Baliguian was heavily damaged by Typhoon Haiyan.
Basco Lighthouse		Basco, Batanes	Basco, Batanes	2003	20 m (66 ft)	20 m (66 ft)	Active	Good
Batag Island Lighthouse		Laoang	Laoang	2000, 1907	30.8 m (101 ft)	313 ft (95 m)	In ruins	A white 66 ft (20 m) cylindrical tower was erected close to the old one. The lantern and light in the old tower is gone.
Bugui Point Lighthouse		Aroroy	Aroroy	1 Dec 1902	15 m (49 ft)		Inactive	A modern white tower was erected close to the old one. The old tower and keeper's house are in poor condition.
Caballo Island lighthouse		Caballo Island	Cavite	1853	11 ft (3.4 m)	96 ft (29 m)	Unknown	The light station was probably destroyed during WWII.
Cabra Island Lighthouse		Lubang	Occidental Mindoro	1 Mar 1889	20 m (66 ft)	66 m (217 ft)	Inactive	A modern white tower was erected close to the old one The old tower and keeper's house are in poor condition.
Cape Bojeador Lighthouse		Burgos	Burgos, Ilocos Norte	1892	20 m (66 ft)	118 m (387 ft)	Active	Original lamp was replaced after it was damaged by the 1990 earthquake.
Cape Bolinao Lighthouse		Bolinao	Bolinao, Pangasinan	1906	27 m (89 ft), 101 ft (31 m)	89 m (292 ft)	Active	Original lamp and lantern room were replaced.
Cape Engaño Lighthouse		Palaui Island	Santa Ana, Cagayan	1892	14 m (46 ft)	100 m (330 ft)	Active	Original lantern room is missing and the buildings are in ruins.
Cape Melville Lighthouse		Balabac Island	Balabac, Palawan	1892	20 m (66 ft), 90 ft (27 m)	90 m (300 ft), 297 ft (91 m)	Active	The tower still retains its original First-order lens and mechanisms.
Cape Santiago Lighthouse		Calatagan	Calatagan	1890	15.5 m (51 ft)	27 m (89 ft)	Active	Original lamp and lantern room were replaced.
Capitancillo Island Lighthouse		Capitancillo	Odlot	1990, 1905	25 m (82 ft), 83 ft (25 m)	30 m (98 ft), 98 ft (30 m)	Replaced	Old tower was replaced with a new white tower and the dwellings are in ruins.
Capones Island Lighthouse		San Antonio	San Antonio, Zambales	1890	20 m (66 ft)	74 m (243 ft)	Active	Original lamp and lantern room were replaced. Tower is in good condition, keeper's house is deteriorating.
Capul Island Lighthouse		Capul	Capul	1896	12 m (39 ft)	43 m (141 ft)	Active	The tower were recently renovated and the original lamp and lantern were replaced.
Corregidor Island Lighthouse		Cavite	Cavite	1853	18 m (59 ft), 42 ft (13 m)	195 m (640 ft), 630 ft (190 m)	Replaced	Damaged by the bombings of World War II.
Corregidor Island lighthouse		Corregidor	Cavite	1950	48 ft (15 m)	633 ft (193 m)	Active	Good
Gorda Point Lighthouse		San Agustin	Romblon	1930	62 ft (19 m)	65 m (213 ft), 213 ft (65 m)	Active	Good
Jintotolo Island lighthouse		Balud	Balud	1903	51 ft (16 m)	187 ft (57 m)	Active	Only the tower is in good condition, the original light and lantern were replaced.
Linao Point lighthouse		Aparri	Cagayan	1896	30 ft (9.1 m)	37 ft (11 m)	In ruins	The station was destroyed during a storm, and some of the ruins remain on the beach.
Lusaran Point lighthouse		Nueva Valencia	Guimaras	1894	38 ft (12 m)	111 ft (34 m)	Replaced	The original lamp and lantern is gone, the iron tower is all rust and the surrounding buildings in ruins.
Malabrigo Point Lighthouse		Lobo	Calabarzon, Lobo, Batangas	1896	17 m (56 ft), 56 ft (17 m)	56 m (184 ft), 184 ft (56 m)	Active	Original lamp and lantern were replaced.
Maniguin Island Lighthouse		Culasi	Culasi, Antique	1906	30 m (98 ft)	58 m (190 ft)	Inactive	Replaced with a nearby white tower; Date is not available.
Pasig River Light		San Nicolas	Manila	1 Sep 1846	49 ft (15 m)	51 ft (16 m), 53.3 ft (16.2 m)	Demolished	Demolished and replaced in 1992.
Pasig River Light		San Nicolas	Manila	1992	46 ft (14 m)	43 ft (13 m)	Active	Good
Poro Point Lighthouse		San Fernando	San Fernando, La Union	1885	20 m (66 ft), 76 ft (23 m)	33 m (108 ft), 107 ft (33 m)	Active	Original 20-meter steel tourelle replaced with 76-foot concrete tower in 1979. Lightkeeper's house built during American era is in ruin.
San Bernardino Island lighthouse		Bulusan	Sorsogon	1896	39 ft (12 m)	136 ft (41 m)	Active	Original lamp and lantern were replaced and when tower was renovated. Other buildings are in disrepair.
San Nicholas Shoals Light		Rosario	Cavite	1879	30 ft (9.1 m)	30 ft (9.1 m)	Replaced	Destroyed by a typhoon in 1881
Sibago Island lighthouse		Tuburan	Basilan	1915	75 ft (23 m)	705 ft (215 m)	Active	Galvanized metal tower. Deactivated on October 31, 2001
Siete Pecados lighthouse		Buenavista	Guimaras	1884	21 ft (6.4 m)	89 ft (27 m)	Active	A new tower was erected next to the old one. Original structure is still maintained.
Tanguingui Island Lighthouse		Madridejos	Madridejos	1994, 1903	34.5 m (113 ft)	39 m (128 ft)	Replaced	The original black steel tower was replaced with a new white tower. Dwellings are in ruins.

== See also ==
- Lists of lighthouses and lightvessels
