= Apo Reef Lighthouse =

Historic lighthouse in Occidental Mindoro, Philippines

Apo Reef Light
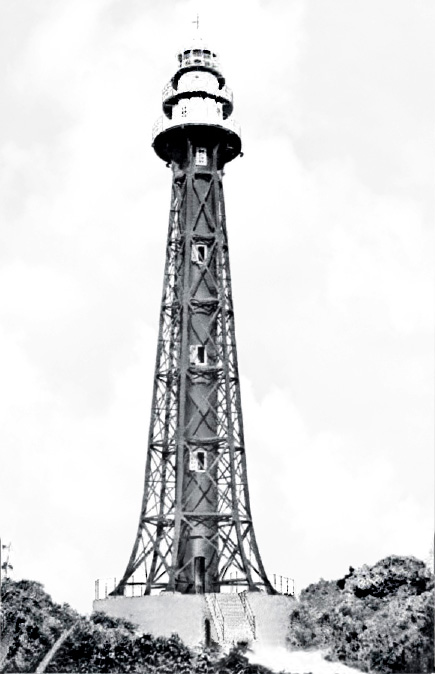
- The first lighthouse tower on Apo Reef
- Location: Apo Reef Natural Park, Sablayan, Occidental Mindoro, Philippines
- Coordinates: 12°39′41.3″N 120°24′52.5″E

Tower
- Constructed: 1906 (first)
- Foundation: concrete foundation
- Construction: metal skeletal tower (first) reinforced concrete tower (current)
- Height: 36 metres (118 ft)
- Shape: hexagonal skeletal frame tower with central cylinder and galleries (first) octagonal prism skeletal surmounted by a square tower with two balconies and no lantern (current)
- Markings: black tower with white three-tiered top (first) white tower (current)

Light
- Focal height: 40.8 metres (134 ft)
- Lens: Third-order Fresnel lens
- Range: 17 nautical miles (31 km; 20 mi)
- Characteristic: Al WR 10s.(firstl); Fl W 10s. (current)

The Apo Reef Light was a historic lighthouse built on Bajo Apo Island in Apo Reef Natural Park. The park is located in the middle of Mindoro Strait, west of the province of Occidental Mindoro, in the Philippines. The station was established to warn ships of the dangerous shallow reefs in that part of the strait.

The original tower was the tallest lighthouse tower ever erected in the Philippines. The 118-ft (36.0-m) tall structure was an iron skeletal tower with a central cylinder, reinforced by a hexagonal frame and topped with the lantern room with two levels of gallery.

== History ==
=== Spanish colonial period ===
The light station on Apo Reef was part of the first approved group of lighthouses in the Maritime Lighting Plan of Spain for the Philippine Archipelago during the Spanish Colonial Period. It was proposed to erect a steel tower with a third-order light on Bajo Apo Island. In 1896, the tower and the lighting apparatus were already purchased complete by the Spanish authorities from France, and they were delivered and stored at the warehouse in Manila. All lighthouse constructions though, were halted with the outbreak of the Philippine Revolution and then the Spanish–American War.

=== American colonial period ===
==== Lighthouse plan ====
When the Americans took control of the Philippines, all the Spanish plans and records were turned over to the United States. In 1903, the Bureau of Lighthouse Construction proposed to continue the construction of the third-order light on Bajo Apo Island. The tower was found in excellent condition at the warehouse by the Americans together with the tower for Capitancillo Islet in Bogo, Cebu. A survey party was sent to the station in November 1903 for the topographical surveying of the Island as no work has ever been attempted yet by the Spaniards on this station—unlike in Tanguingui Island or Capitancillo Island where some construction has already been started.

Several plans were considered and compared with the original Spanish plans. It was finally decided that for all structures, except for the tower, a different construction would be used, instead of the heavy masonry buildings in the Spanish design, modern reinforced concrete structures would be erected. This construction would be lighter, require less material, and therefore be more economical and still be fully as strong and permanent as the heavier construction.

The tower and lighting apparatus found stored in Manila were examined and found to be in excellent condition, with only a few parts missing. Complete plans were made, a budget of ₱65,000 was set for the project and by June 1904, a party of 1 American and 45 Filipinos was organized.

==== First light ====
The party was sent to the island on July 6, 1904, and a temporary light was immediately established. A lens lantern with a fixed white light was put up to light the station.

Temporary quarters were constructed for the workers and a road had to be made from the dwelling site to the tower before the party could begin work on the station proper and the tower. On August 5, another American was added to the party and Filipino workers were added from time to time as the work demanded.

The work progressed continuously with the exception of a few delays caused by lack of fresh water. As none is found on the island or in the immediate vicinity, water for drinking purposes had to be supplied from Manila, Romblon province or the adjacent coast of Mindoro. About the first of August, the sloop Jervey was sent to the station for this purpose, but on account of the dangerous anchorage, it was later transferred to Maniguin Island where lighthouse construction was simultaneously going on.

==== Completion ====
The assistant overseer and the larger part of the party returned to Manila June 22, 1905. At the end of the year, they had practically completed the tower and buildings, except for the execution of some unimportant details and the lighting apparatus, which could not be installed for some months, as it was necessary to make several missing parts. Work on the missing parts was done in the new repair shop of the Bureau located on Engineer Island in the Port of Manila. The third-order light was finally lit around April, 1906.

== Current tower ==
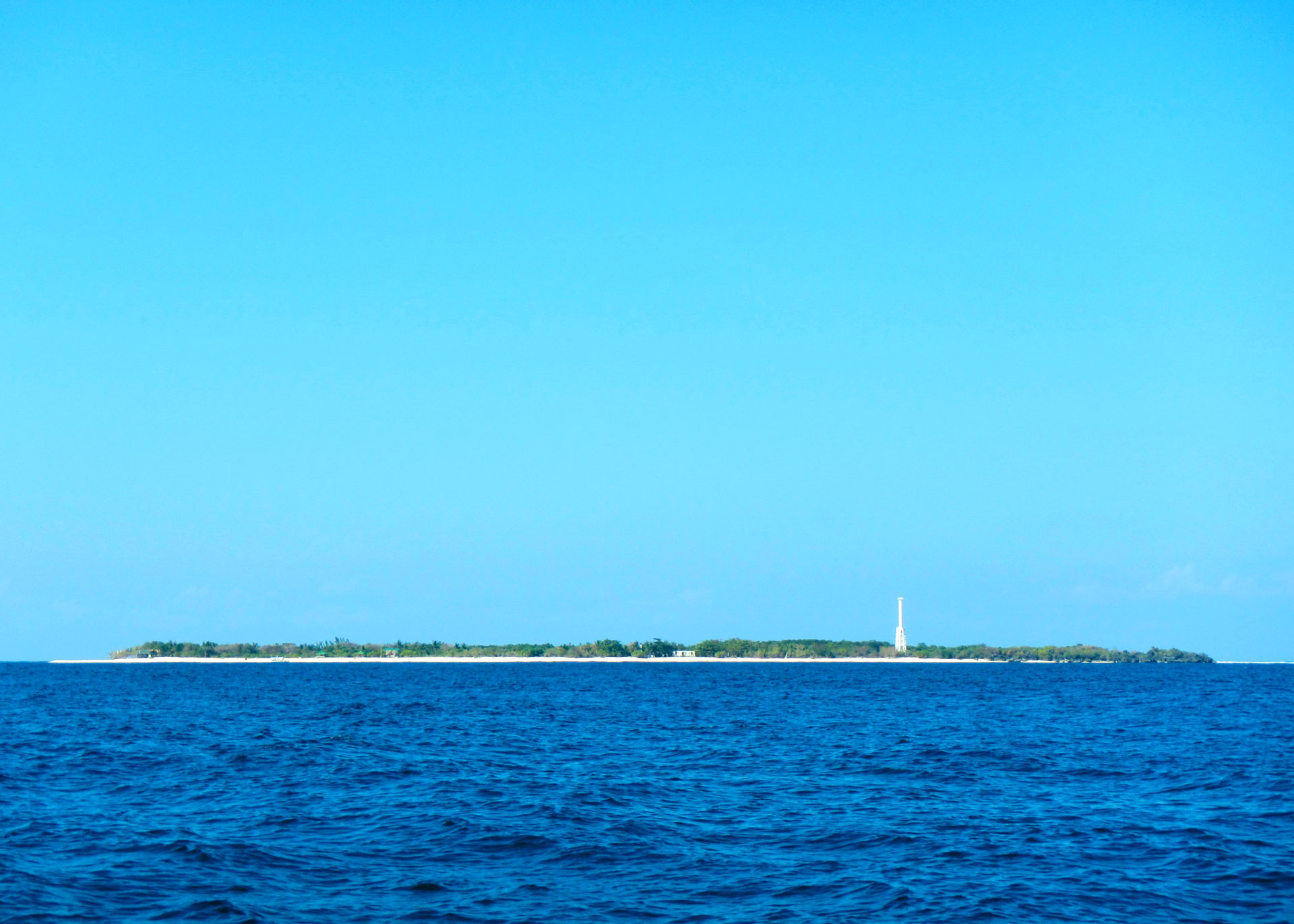

A modern 110-foot tall white tower with solar-powered lights now stands at the location of the old tower. It was erected by a Japanese company as part of the Maritime Safety Improvement Project-2 by the Philippine Coast Guard. All lighthouses in the Philippines are managed by that government agency.

== See also ==
- List of lighthouses in the Philippines
