= Batag Island Lighthouse =

Historic lighthouse in Northern Samar, Philippines

Batag Island lighthouse
- Location: Laoang, Northern Samar, Philippines
- Coordinates: 12°39′29.46″N 125°3′39.13″E

Tower
- Constructed: 1907
- Construction: reinforced concrete tower
- Height: 30.8 metres (101 ft)
- Shape: cylindrical tower with double balcony and lantern
- Markings: unpainted tower
- Heritage: National Historical Landmark
- Fog signal: none

Light
- First lit: 2000, 1907
- Deactivated: 2006
- Focal height: 95.4 metres (313 ft)
- Lens: third-order dioptric
- Range: 25 miles (40 km)
- Characteristic: Fl W 10s.

Batag Island Lighthouse is a historic lighthouse on Batag Island off the coast of the town of Laoang in the province of Northern Samar in the Philippines. The light marks the northeastern point of Samar Island and led international ships to the entrance of the San Bernardino Strait marked by the San Bernardino Light. One of the most traveled waterways in the archipelago, together with the Capul Island Light, these stations are invaluable to vessels coming from the Pacific Ocean and entering the country through the San Bernardino Strait on its way to Manila or any other ports of the Philippines.

After Maniguin Island and Cape Bolinao Lighthouse, this is the third major lighthouse wholly designed and built by the Americans in the early part of American Colonial Period in the Philippines. It was the exact duplicate of the Cape Bolinao lighthouse when it was completed, both standing at 101 ft (30.8m) and both equipped with third-order lights.

The Batag lighthouse together with the Capul Island Lighthouse were declared provincial historical landmarks by the province of Northern Samar in October 2008.

Lighthouses in the Philippines are maintained by the Philippine Coast Guard.

== History ==
=== Spanish Colonial Era ===
A lighthouse on Batag Island was on the first approved group of 42 lights in the Spanish Maritime Lighting Plan of the Philippine Archipelago. A first-order light was planned for the location but the project was terminated early on.

=== American Colonial Period ===
==== Building the station ====
In 1906, the Director of Navigation, J. M. Helm proposed the construction of two third-class lights, one on Batag Island and the other on Isabel Island in Romblon province. A temporary landing pier was constructed on the island to facilitate the landing of materials for the construction of the station. At the end of the year, there was practically no money available for the construction of new lights after adopting the permanent improvement policy wherein all timber structures were rebuilt with permanent materials like reinforced concrete as fast as they reach the limit of economical repair. The policy has resulted in the installation of fewer lights per annum, but which has rapidly reduced the cost of maintaining the system.

==== Act no. 1662 ====
On January 11, 1907, the Philippine Commission approved Act no. 1662 which authorized funding for several public works, permanent improvements and other purposes of the Insular Government, of which the building of several lights by the Bureau of Navigation was included. A budget of ₱100,000 was appropriated for the Bureau of Navigation to which ₱85,000 was set for the construction of a third-order light on Batag and ₱15,000, to be expended in the construction of minor light stations at San Miguel Island, Isabel Island, and Punta Pata.

With the third-order light on Batag Island, and when the lights on San Miguel and Isabel islands are in operation, a vessel "picking up" Batag light 26 miles at sea and passing through San Bernardino Strait will not lose sight of a light during the passage to Manila.

==== Temporary light ====
A sixth-order port light was temporarily installed and lit during the construction of the light station. At the same time, the Bureau of Navigation contracted Barbier, Benard & Turenne of Paris for the third-order lighting apparatus.

==== Lighthouse design ====
The American engineers used the same tower design as the Cape Bolinao Lighthouse which was finished the year before. The tower is cylindrical in shape and made with reinforced concrete which was used extensively throughout including the keeper's dwellings and roofing. The tower measuring 101 feet from base to focal plane is situated on top of Culipapa Hill at an elevation 218 feet above mean low water and with a focal height of 313 ft (95.4 m).

For stability against typhoon which is frequently occurring this side of the archipelago, the American engineers designed the Philippine lighthouse towers to withstand wind velocity of 120 miles per hour. The design of tower selected, consisting essentially of a long, hollow, concrete cylinder resting on a spreading base, each face of which was a plane surface, required comparatively few forms, and of such a simple character as to give little excuse for mistakes of any kind. The cornices, the door and window openings, and the bracketed balcony of the lantern room are the only features that relieve the simplicity of the design.

The heavy tower base serves the double purpose of increasing the arm about which the tower would tend to rotate, and of keeping the center of gravity of the entire structure as low as possible for stability during earthquakes. As an additional guard, all factors of safety were made large, and the quantities of concrete and of metal reinforcement were both increased beyond what would be required in ordinary construction.

The light station was in operation by January, 1908 at a completed cost is ₱91,579.07.

==== Original lighting apparatus ====
The original illuminating apparatus of the Batag lighthouse was of Barbier, Benard & Turenne (Paris) manufacture, with incandescent lighting system of 3,000 candlepower. The third-order dioptric prismatic lenses revolving on mercury floats, which by the refraction and reflection of rays from the incandescent oil vapor lamps produce white flashes of approximately 100,000 candlepower which are clearly visible under ordinary conditions at the limit of their geographical ranges of 25 nautical miles (40.2 km).

== Present condition ==
A new solar-powered white tower was installed by the Philippine Coast Guard adjacent to the old lighthouse in the early 2000. When the region was hit by the Typhoon Milenyo on September 28, 2006, the modern lighthouse tower was toppled and destroyed rendering that part of the coast in the dark ever since.

Based on recent pictures, the old lighting apparatus on the original tower is gone and the structure was dilapidated and deteriorating. It was one of the lighthouses listed by the Philippine Coast Guard that are available for adoption for corporate or individuals, allowing the use of the property in exchange for the maintenance of the lighthouse.

== See also ==
- List of lighthouses in the Philippines
