= Typhoon Melor =

Pacific typhoon in 2015

Typhoon Melor (Nona)
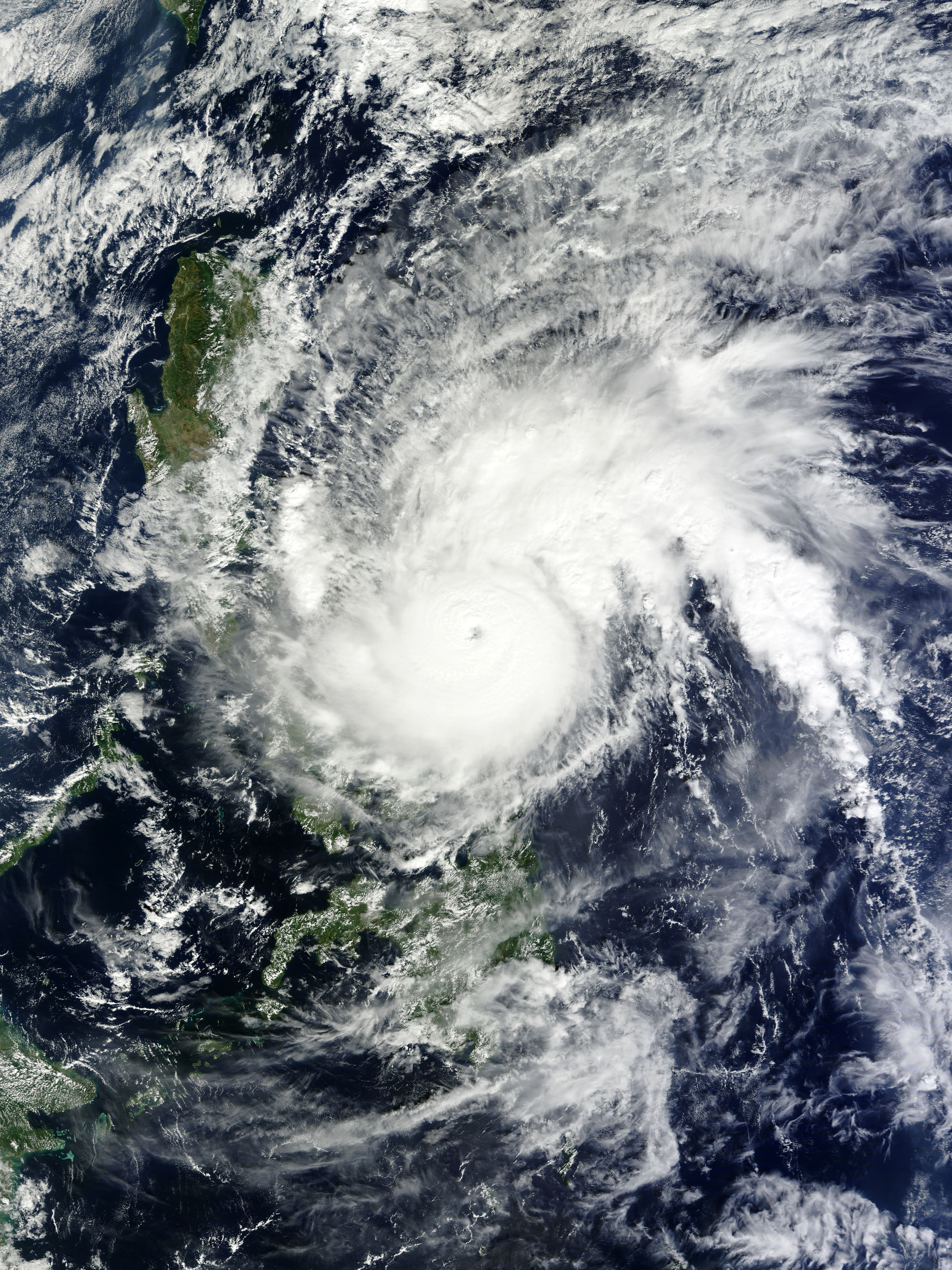
- Melor at peak intensity near Samar on December 14

Meteorological history
- Formed: December 10, 2015
- Dissipated: December 17, 2015

Very strong typhoon
- 10-minute sustained (JMA)
- Highest winds: 175 km/h (110 mph)
- Lowest pressure: 935 hPa (mbar); 27.61 inHg

Category 4-equivalent typhoon
- 1-minute sustained (SSHWS/JTWC)
- Highest winds: 230 km/h (145 mph)
- Lowest pressure: 929 hPa (mbar); 27.43 inHg

Overall effects
- Fatalities: 51 total
- Damage: $148 million (2015 USD)
- Areas affected: Caroline Islands, Philippines
- IBTrACS
- Part of the 2015 Pacific typhoon season

Typhoon Melor, (Note: The name Melor (Malay: melor, [məˈlor]) was contributed by Malaysia and refers to the Arabian jasmine (Jasminum sambac) in Malay.) known locally as Typhoon Nona, was a powerful tropical cyclone that struck the Philippines in mid-December 2015. The twenty-seventh named storm and the eighteenth typhoon of the annual typhoon season, Melor killed 51 people and caused ₱7.04 billion (US$148.3 million) in damage.

The typhoon began developing on December 7 as a low-pressure area 120 km (75 mi) of Chuuk. Soon, it intensified into a tropical depression on December 10, and then into a tropical storm south of Yap, and was named Melor. The Philippine Atmospheric, Geophysical and Astronomical Services Administration (PAG-ASA) initially decided to name Melor as "Nonoy", but due to political reasons, it was named "Nona" instead. On December 13, Tropical Storm Melor (Nona) became a typhoon, and made its first landfall on Northern Samar. The typhoon made several landfalls in Sorsogon, Burias Island, Romblon, and Oriental Mindoro, before weakening into a tropical storm. It turned southward on entering the South China Sea before weakening into a tropical depression and dissipating in the Sulu Sea.

== Meteorological history ==
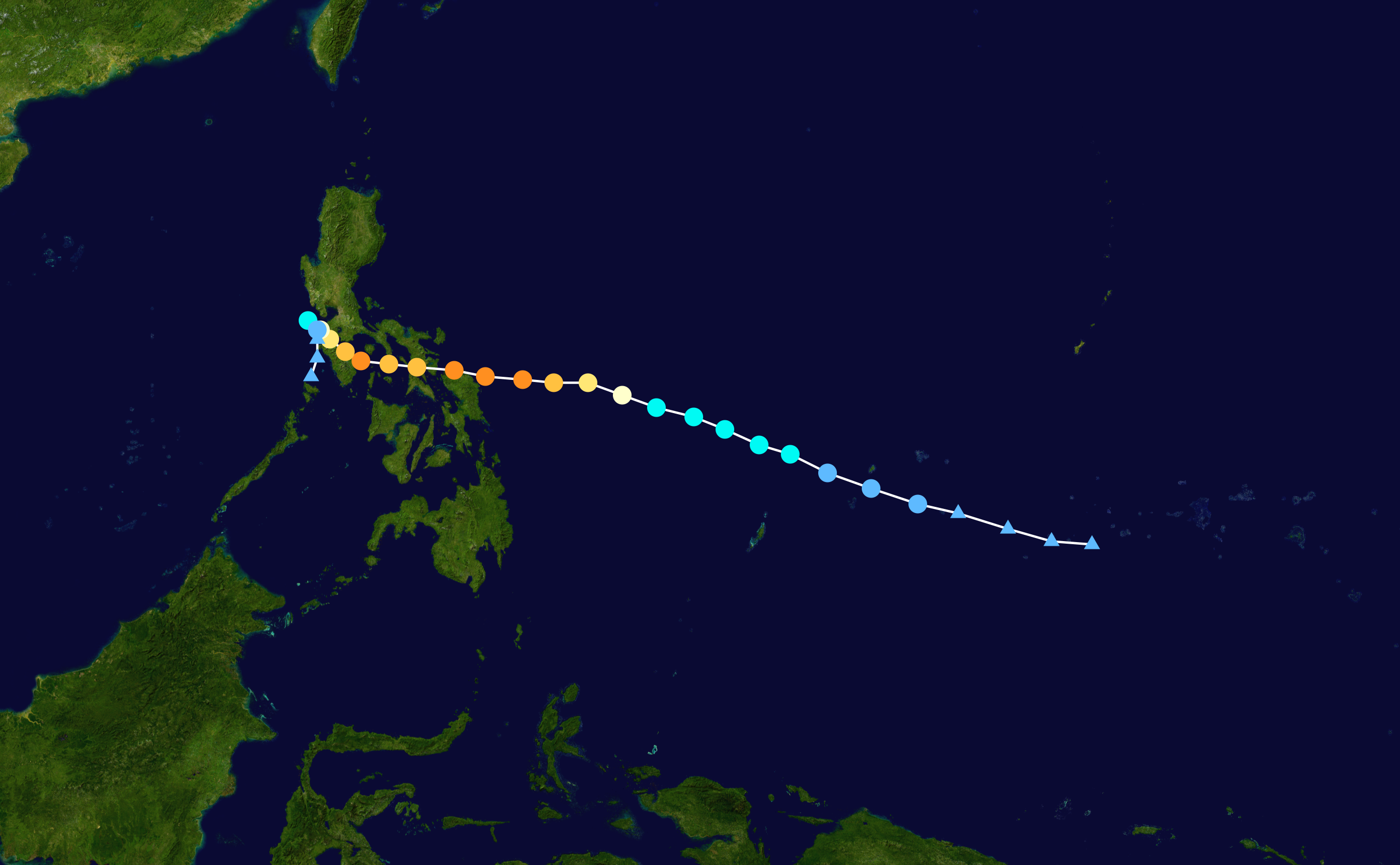
Map plotting the storm's track and intensity, according to the Saffir–Simpson scale Map key Saffir–Simpson scale Tropical depression (≤38 mph, ≤62 km/h) Tropical storm (39–73 mph, 63–118 km/h) Category 1 (74–95 mph, 119–153 km/h) Category 2 (96–110 mph, 154–177 km/h) Category 3 (111–129 mph, 178–208 km/h) Category 4 (130–156 mph, 209–251 km/h) Category 5 (≥157 mph, ≥252 km/h) Unknown Storm type Tropical cyclone Subtropical cyclone Extratropical cyclone, remnant low, tropical disturbance, or monsoon depression

During December 10, the Japan Meteorological Agency started to monitor a tropical depression, that had developed about 665 km (415 mi) to the south of Guam. The system was located within a favorable environment for further development, with low vertical wind shear and sea surface temperatures of between 29–30 °C (84–86 °F). Moreover, the JMA started to issue tropical cyclone warnings to the system on the same day, expecting a tropical storm within 24 hours. Based on a developing low-level circulation center (LLCC) obscured by the mid-level deep convection in an area of strong westward upper-level diffluence and moderate easterly vertical wind shear, the Joint Typhoon Warning Center (JTWC) issued a Tropical Cyclone Formation Alert (TCFA) to the system early on December 11. The JMA, however, upgraded the tropical depression to a tropical storm immediately after issuing that TCFA and named it Melor, when the storm was only about 50 km (31 mi) south of Yap. In the afternoon, the JTWC upgraded it to a tropical depression and designated it as 28W, just six hours before the center upgraded Melor to a tropical storm that was tracking west-northwestward along the southern periphery of a deep-layered subtropical ridge.

The PAGASA was about to name the tropical storm as Nonoy, yet it was named Nona after entering the Philippine Area of Responsibility on December 12, owing to political reasons. When Melor was forming an eye in the afternoon, the JMA upgraded it to a severe tropical storm. Due to low vertical wind shear, warm sea surface temperatures above 28°C and robust poleward outflow enhanced by a very powerful Aleutian low, Melor intensified into a typhoon early on December 13, as tightly curved spiral banding was observed wrapping into a tiny but clear eye. The JTWC upgraded Melor to a SSHWS Category 4-equivalent typhoon at noon. Although the eye appeared to be cloud-filled temporarily, the eyewall consolidated further. Melor made landfall over Batag Island of Laoang, Northern Samar of the Philippines at 11:00 PST (03:00 UTC) on December 14. The JMA reported a peak intensity of ten-minute maximum sustained winds at 175 km/h (110 mph) and a central pressure of 935 hPa (27.61 inHg). The typhoon formed a well-defined eye and then maintained it for several hours while crossing the northern coast of Samar. Later, it made its second landfall over Bulusan, Sorsogon at 16:00 PST (08:00 UTC) and third landfall over Burias Island at 21:45 PST (13:45 UTC), resulting in a cloud-filled eye again. Shortly after Melor made its fourth landfall over Banton Island, Romblon at 05:30 PST on December 15 (21:30 UTC on December 14), the typhoon significantly intensified again with a distinct 25-km (15-mile) eye and a compact core. Right before making its fifth landfall on Pinamalayan, Oriental Mindoro at 10:30 PST (02:30 UTC), the JTWC indicated that Melor had reached peak intensity with one-minute maximum sustained winds at 230 km/h (145 mph), just shy of the super typhoon status.

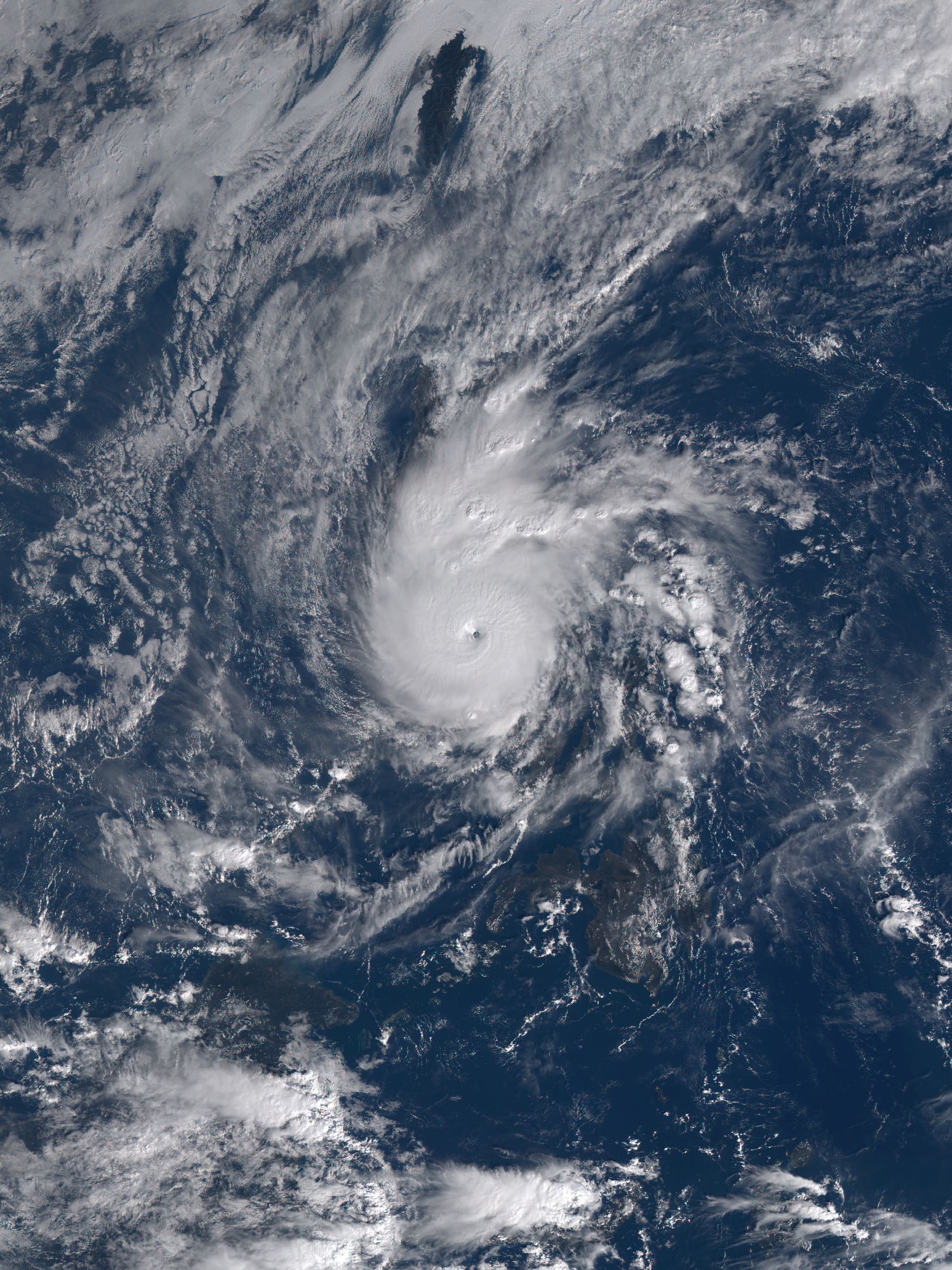
Typhoon Melor near Mindoro on December 15

Shortly after the typhoon made its final landfall, its eye rapidly became cloud-filled. Inflow along the southwestern quadrant was forced over the mountainous central terrain of Mindoro, and strong poleward outflow was also weakening owing to the decreasing linkage to mid-latitude flow. Emerging into the South China Sea and moving northwestward in the afternoon, Melor started to encounter strong vertical wind shear as well as strong northeasterly low-level flow associated with a developing cold surge. Melor was downgraded to a severe tropical storm by the JMA and a tropical storm by the JTWC early on December 16 when the upper-level environment was deteriorating and causing the system to disintegrate, leading to the steering influence shifting to the low-level flow. Thus, the quickly weakening storm made a U-turn and moved southward. The JMA downgraded Melor to a tropical storm at noon, although the system's convection had been sheared away from the low-level circulation center. Several of meteorological agencies downgraded Melor to a tropical depression early on December 17, including the JMA and JTWC, who issued final warnings on the system; however, satellite imageries depicted an open trough instead of a discernable LLCC. The system completely dissipated in the Sulu Sea before noon.

== Preparations ==
=== Highest Tropical Cyclone Warning Signal ===
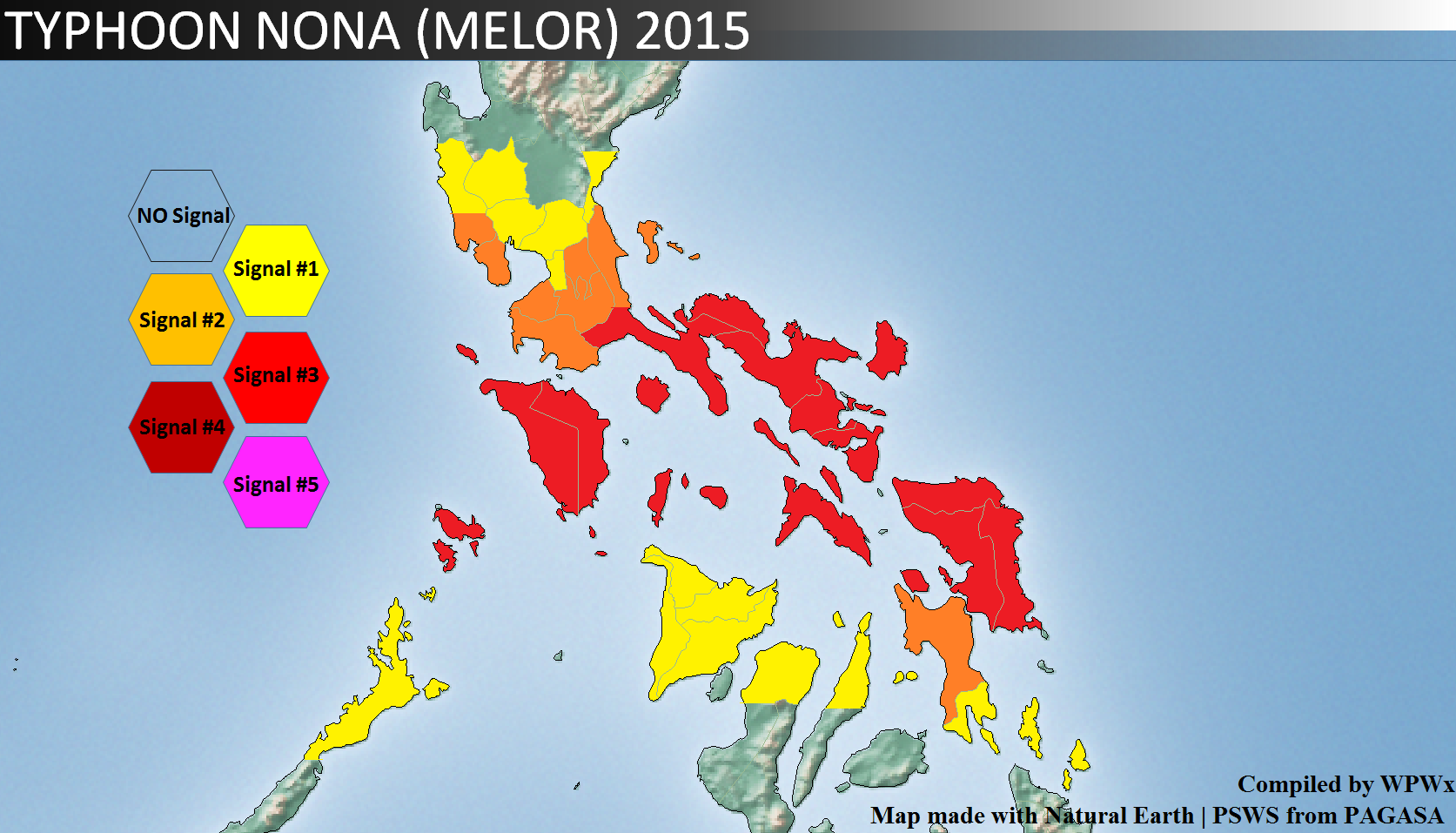
Highest TCWS raised by PAGASA across the Philippines in relation to Typhoon Melor

TCWS#	Luzon	Visayas	Mindanao
3	Catanduanes, Camarines Norte, Camarines Sur, Albay, Sorsogon, Marinduque, Romblon, Southern Portion of Quezon, Oriental Mindoro, Occidental Mindoro, Northern Portion of Palawan, Masbate incl. Ticao and Burias Islands	Northern Samar, Eastern Samar, Samar, Biliran	None
2	Batangas, Laguna, Bataan, Southern Portion of Zambales, Rizal, rest of Quezon including Polillo Island	Leyte	None
1	Bulacan, Tarlac, Lubang Island, Rest of Zambales, Southern Portion of Aurora, Cavite, Central Portion of Palawan including Puerto Princesa City, Metro Manila	Southern Leyte, Northern Portion of Cebu incl. Bantayan and Camotes Islands, Aklan, Capiz, Northern Portion of Negros Occidental, Northern Portion of Iloilo	Dinagat Island, Siargao Island

=== Bicol and Eastern Visayas ===
In preparation for the typhoon, 700,000 residents in several provinces were evacuated. On Albay, work on all government and private offices was suspended, except for disaster response. Classes were also suspended on most of Bicol and parts of Eastern Visayas. A no-sail zone was implemented in areas where the typhoon was expected to pass. Many flights to areas in Bicol and Eastern Luzon were cancelled on December 14, following the approaching typhoon. On December 13, storm signal no. 3 was raised on Catanduanes, Sorsogon, Albay, Northern Samar, Eastern Samar, and Samar.

=== Southern Luzon and MIMAROPA ===
As the typhoon neared Northern Samar on December 14, PAGASA raised storm signal no. 2 on southern Quezon and signal no. 1 on Batangas, Cavite, Rizal, Laguna, and the rest of Quezon (including Polillo Island). Ferry services between Batangas City, Mindoro, and Caticlan were suspended when storm signal no. 1 was raised on Aklan.

=== Metro Manila ===
The Metropolitan Manila Development Authority(MMDA) placed a yellow alert on Metro Manila as Typhoon Nona approached Mindoro. Storm signal no. 1 was raised on Metro Manila when the typhoon neared Northern Samar. On December 16, preschool classes were suspended on the whole region, while classes on all levels were suspended on Muntinlupa, Pateros, Taguig, San Juan, Pasay, Quezon City, Malabon, and Valenzuela.

== Impact ==
On December 14, Typhoon Nona (Melor) first made its first landfall on Batag Island on Northern Samar. On the same day, it made its second landfall in Sorsogon.

Typhoon Nona caused most devastation in Mindoro and Romblon. Oriental Mindoro was placed under a state of calamity due to the devastation caused by the typhoon. Pinamalayan in Oriental Mindoro was worst hit, with 15,000 homes destroyed, 24,000 families (108,000 people) in evacuation centers.

51 people were killed during the typhoon, and damages amounted to ₱7.04 billion (US$148.3 million). In Metro Manila, floods affected traffic and commuters. Water levels of reservoirs rose, especially at Angat Dam. More than 168,000 houses were damaged or destroyed. Several roads were also closed due to the typhoon. More than 200,000 people stayed on evacuation centers due to the effects of the typhoon. A state of calamity was declared on the whole country under Presidential Decree (P.D.) 1186 to speed up rescue, recovery, relief and rehabilitation operations following the devastation by the typhoon.

Several areas in Central Luzon, mostly in Nueva Ecija, Bulacan, Pampanga, Tarlac, Isabela, and Aurora, were flooded by rain caused by Typhoon Nona. Calumpit was heavily flooded, with floods 4 feet deep and 427 families evacuated. Dams were also filled by water, almost reaching their spilling levels.

== Naming issues ==
Before Typhoon Melor entered the Philippine Area of Responsibility (PAR), the Philippine Atmospheric, Geophysical and Astronomical Services Administration (PAGASA) at first decided that the typhoon would be named "Nonoy". However, owing to its similarity to President Benigno Aquino III's nickname, "Noynoy", PAGASA renamed the typhoon "Nona", despite that name's usage during 2011.

=== Retirement ===
Due to the severe damage caused by the typhoon, the name Melor was retired at the Forty-eighth Joint Session of the ESCAP/WMO Typhoon Committee and WMO/ESCAP Panel on Tropical Cyclones during 2016. In February 2017, they chose the name Cempaka to replace Melor. PAGASA announced that they had retired Nona from the rotating lists of tropical cyclone names in the Philippines. On January 20, 2016, the name Nimfa was chosen to supplant both Nona and Nonoy for the 2019 season.

== See also ==
- Weather of 2015
- Tropical cyclones in 2015
- List of Philippine typhoons (2000–present)
