= Bugui Point Lighthouse =

Historic lighthouse in Masbate, Philippines

- Location: Bugui Point, Masbate Island, Aroroy, Philippines
- Coordinates: 12°36′01″N 123°14′17″E

Tower
- Constructed: 1893
- Construction: stone (tower)
- Height: 15 m (49 ft)
- Shape: tapered cylindrical tower with balcony and lantern
- Markings: grey

Light
- First lit: 1 December 1902
- Lens: third order Fresnel lens
- Active light
- Height: 15 m (49 ft)
- Shape: cylindrical tower with flared top
- Markings: white
- Focal height: 66 m (217 ft)
- Range: 20 nmi (37 km; 23 mi)
- Characteristic: Fl(3) W 10s

Bugui Point Lighthouse is a historic lighthouse located on Bugui Point in the town of Aroroy, in the northern tip of Masbate Island, province of Masbate, in the Philippines. It lights the entrance to the channel between Burias Island and Masbate Island and the channel between Burias and Ticao Islands leading to San Bernardino Strait.

Work on the light began in October 1893 but was halted by the Philippine Revolution in 1896. After the Philippine-American War, lighthouse construction was resumed by the new American government in the Philippines; and Bugui Point Lighthouse was lit on December 1, 1902.

== See also ==
- List of lighthouses in the Philippines
