= Mindoro Strait =

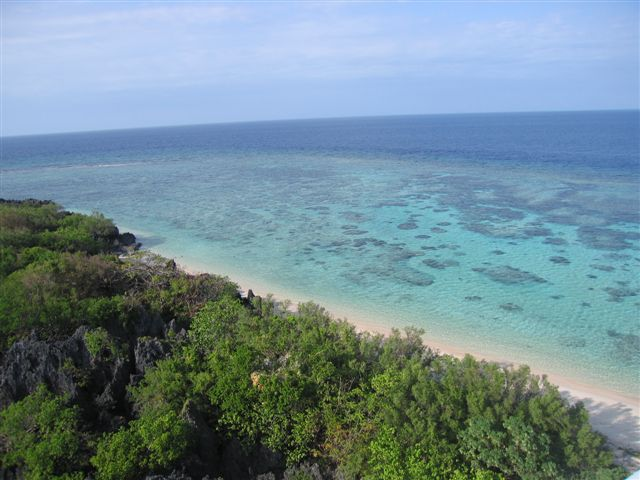
- The strait seen from the Apo Reef Lighthouse

- Location within the Philippines Mindoro Strait (Palawan) Mindoro Strait (Philippines)
- Location: Mimaropa
- Coordinates: 12°19′59″N 120°40′0″E
- Type: strait
- Etymology: Mindoro

The Mindoro Strait (Tagalog: Kipot ng Mindoro) is one of the straits connecting the South China Sea with the Sulu Sea in the Philippines. It separates Mindoro Island from Busuanga Island (one of the Calamian Islands of Palawan Province). Located between the two islands is the Apo Reef, the largest coral reef system in the Philippines. The reef divides the strait into the Apo East Pass and the Apo West Pass.

The Mindoro Strait is part of an alternative route for ships passing between the Indian and Pacific oceans and a common one for those exceeding the Malaccamax size and therefore incapable of using the Strait of Malacca.

Modern bathymetric soundings have shown that the centers of the Mindoro Strait and the Sibutu Passage are both deep enough that they probably existed during the last ice age, thus contradicting the favored H. Otley Beyer's theory that the first settlers of the Philippines came through land bridges around that period. If verified, the earliest people of the country would have needed boats to cross the open sea to reach the islands.

== See also ==
- Balabac Strait – another strait connecting the South China Sea with the Sulu Sea
