= Capul Island Lighthouse =

Historic lighthouse in Northern Samar, Philippines

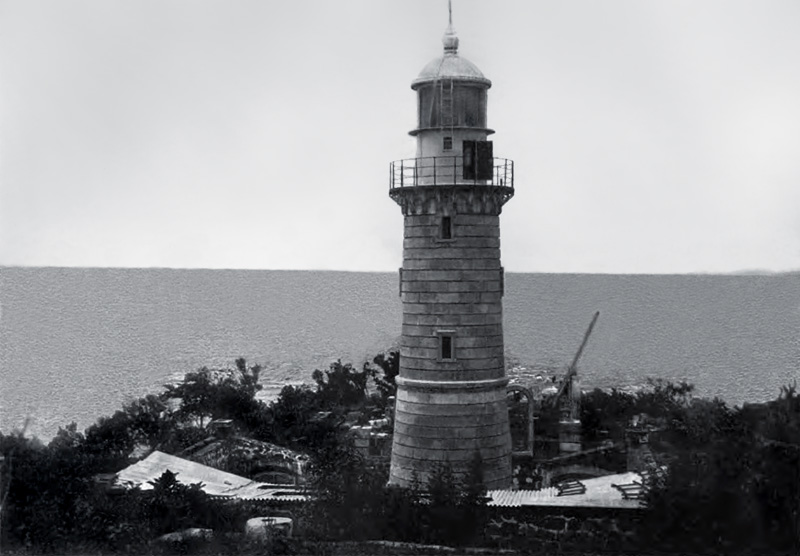
- Location: Capul Island, Northern Samar, Philippines
- Coordinates: 12°28′53″N 124°08′29″E

Tower
- Constructed: 1896
- Construction: granite tower
- Height: 12 metres (39 ft)
- Shape: cylindrical tower with double balcony and lantern
- Markings: white tower with red trims, white lantern
- Heritage: National Historical Landmark
- Fog signal: none

Light
- First lit: 1896
- Focal height: 43 metres (141 ft)
- Lens: third-order Fresnel lens
- Range: 18 nautical miles (33 km; 21 mi)
- Characteristic: Fl W 7s.

Capul Island Lighthouse is a historic lighthouse on Titoog Point in San Luis on the northern tip of Capul Island, Northern Samar in the Philippines. It marks the western entrance to the San Bernardino Strait coming in from Ticao Pass.

The design of the lighthouse started in 1892 under Guillermo Brockman. He designed a cylindrical lighthouse with a pavilion and machinery. Construction on the lighthouse was started in October 1893 under Francisco Perez Muñoz and it was first lit in December 1896 while the station was still partially complete. Work was suspended a month before in November 1896 on the onset of the Philippine Revolution. The pavilion was finished during the American era.

The Capul Island Lighthouse together with the Batag Island Lighthouse were declared provincial historical landmarks by the province of Northern Samar in October 2008.

== Historical marker ==
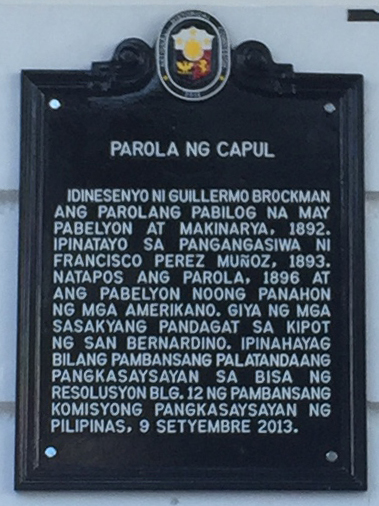
Historical marker installed in 2018

The lighthouse was declared as a National Historical Landmark on September 9, 2013. The marker entitled Parola ng Capul was installed on October 24, 2018. It was installed by the National Historical Commission of the Philippines.

Original Filipino Text	Translated English Text
IDINISENYO NI GUILLERMO BROCKMAN ANG PAROLANG PABILOG NA MAY PABELYON AT MAKINARYA, 1892. IPINATAYO SA PANGANGASIWA NI FRANCISCO PEREZ MUÑOZ, 1893. NATAPOS ANG PAROLA, 1896 AT ANG PABELYON NOONG PANAHON NG MGA AMERIKANO. GIYA NG MGA SASAKYANG PANDAGAT SA KIPOT NG SAN BERNARDINO. IPINAHAYAG BILANG PAMBANSANG PALATANDAANG PANGKASAYSAYAN SA BISA NG RESOLUSYON BLG. 12 NG PAMBANSANG KOMISYONG PANGKASAYSAYAN NG PILIPINAS, 9 SETYEMBRE 2013.	The cylindrical lighthouse with pavilion and machinery was designed by Guillermo Brockman, 1892. Constructed under the administration of Francisco Perez Muñoz, 1893. The lighthouse was finished in 1896 while the pavilion was finished during the American Era. Serves as a guide for ships traversing along San Bernardino Strait. Declared as a National Historical Landmark under the Resolution No. 12 of the National Historical Commission of the Philippines, September 9, 2013.

== See also ==
- List of lighthouses in the Philippines
