= Cape Melville Lighthouse =

Historic lighthouse in Palawan, Philippines

Cape Melville lighthouse
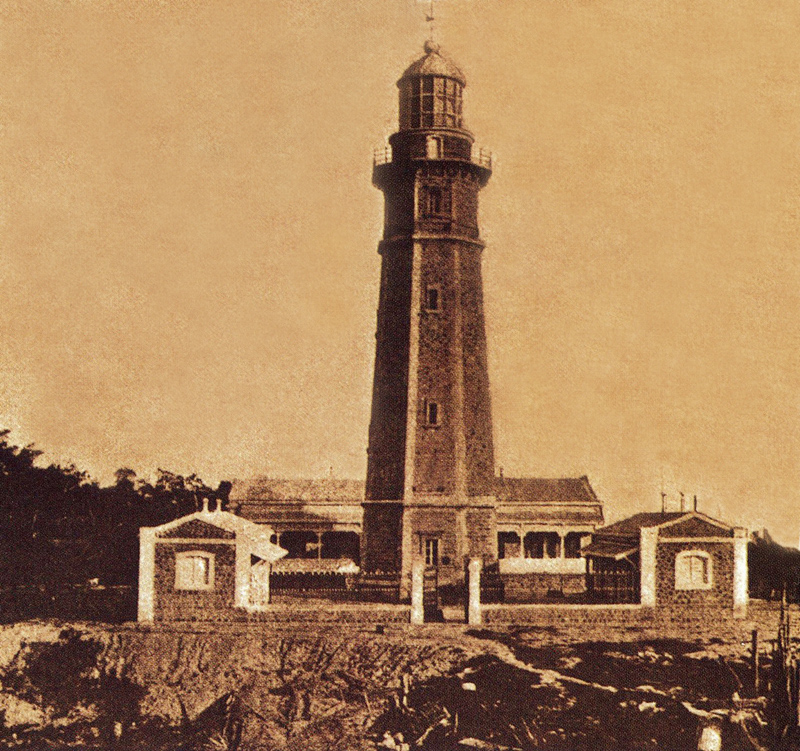
- The lighthouse in Balabac Island, shortly after its completion in 1892
- Location: Balabac Island, Palawan, Philippines
- Coordinates: 7°49′02.7″N 117°00′10.6″E

Tower
- Constructed: 1892 (first)
- Construction: stone tower (first) fiberglass (current)
- Height: 27.5 metres (90 ft) (first); 20 metres (66 ft) (current)
- Shape: octagonal tower with balcony and lantern (first) cylindrical tower with flared top (current)
- Markings: unpaiunted tower, white cupola
- Heritage: National Historical Landmark

Light
- First lit: 1892
- Focal height: 90 metres (300 ft)
- Lens: first-order Fresnel lens
- Range: 28 nautical miles (52 km; 32 mi)
- Characteristic: Fl W 5s.

The Cape Melville Lighthouse is a historic lighthouse located in the island of Balabac, the southernmost point of the province of Palawan in the Philippines. It is also the southwest corner of the archipelago. The first-order light was constructed by the Spaniards to light Balabac Strait, the treacherous body of water that separates the Philippines from the neighboring country of Malaysia, and was first lit in 1892.

== Construction ==
The light is displayed from a 90-foot (27 m) tall granite tower, located on a hill 1.5 miles (2.4 km) northwestward of the tip of Cape Melville, for a total elevation of 297 feet (91 m) above sea level. The station was built by the Spanish Government as part of their extensive lighting plan for the archipelago. Construction started in 1818, however there were numerous delays, meaning the lighthouse of Cape Melville wasn't lit until August 30, 1892.

== Current condition ==
The Spanish lighthouse is no longer in service and a white aluminum prefabricated tower with modern solar-powered light was erected near the grounds of the old tower by the Philippine Coast Guard, who maintain all lighthouses in the Philippines. Because the station is still manned, the original lights and lenses are still intact except for a central glass pane which was stolen by vandals. The tower still retains its original clockwork but is inoperative.

== National Historical Landmark ==
The lighthouse (or Minarit) located at Barangay Melville in Balabac Island, Palawan was declared as a National Historical Landmark by the National Historical Commission of the Philippines.

== See also ==
- List of lighthouses in the Philippines
