= Maniguin Island Lighthouse =

Historic lighthouse in Antique, Philippines

Maniguin Island lighthouse
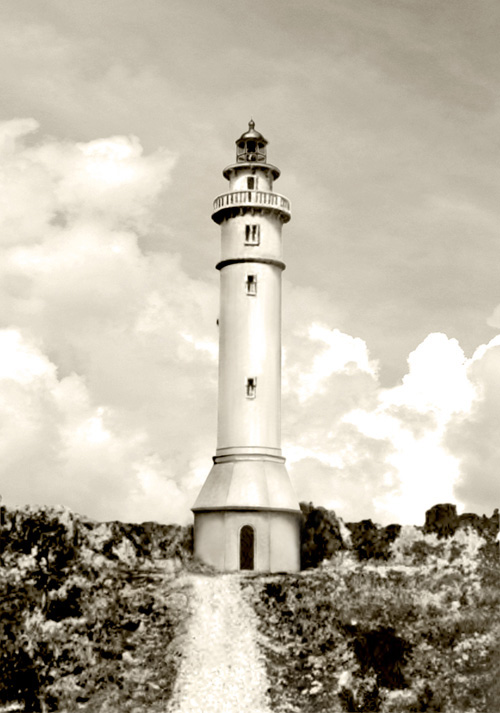
- Location: Culasi, Antique, Philippines
- Coordinates: 11°35′52.58″N 121°41′48.21″E

Tower
- Constructed: 1906 (first)
- Construction: reinforced concrete tower (first) fiberglass tower (current)
- Height: 30 metres (98 ft) (first); 30 metres (98 ft) (current)
- Shape: cylindrical tower with balcony and lantern cylinfrical tower with flared top (curren)
- Markings: white tower (first and current)
- Power source: solar power

Light
- First lit: 1906
- Focal height: 58 metres (190 ft) (current)
- Lens: fourth-order Fresnel lens
- Range: 20 nautical miles (37 km; 23 mi)
- Characteristic: Fl (2) W 10s.

The Maniguin Island Lighthouse is a lighthouse that marks the Cuyo East Passage, a main shipping route south into the Sulu Sea. The island, also known as Maningning Island or Hammerhead Island, is located 42.6 kilometres (26.5 mi) off of the coast of Culasi, Antique in the Philippines. It has a narrow ridge 33.5 metres (110 ft) high across its southern end, and the remainder of the island is low and wooded, and not more than 4.5 metres (15 ft) high. It is fringed with coral reefs with deep water at their edges. The round cylindrical concrete tower with a gallery on top is located near the southeastern point of the island.

== History ==
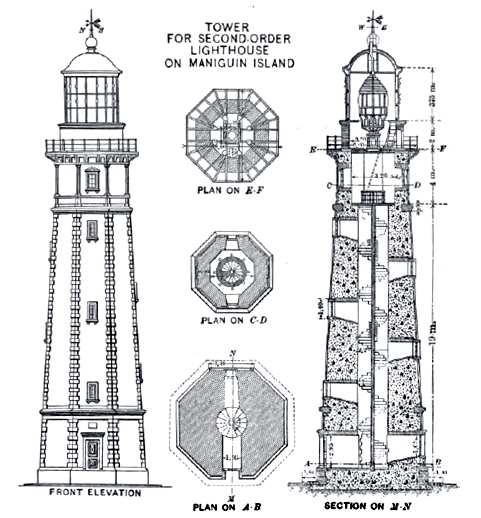
Original Spanish design for the Maniguin Lighthouse

=== The Spanish plan for the station ===
The Spanish Government's plan of building a second-order lighthouse on Maniguin Island was part of the Maritime Lighting program of the Philippine Archipelago which was in full swing in the latter part of 19th century. The original design was a beautiful and massive masonry tower similar to the Cape Melville Lighthouse.

When the Americans took control of the Philippines after the Spanish–American War, the Spanish plans and records for all lighthouses were turned over to the United States. New, more economical plans were adopted to illuminate the islands as quickly as possible from the limited insular funds available, and the Spanish plans were scrapped.

=== Construction of the lighthouse ===
In 1904, a preliminary examination was made of this island. A map has been made and the elevation of the site of the proposed station obtained. A new plan for the various structures to be erected was prepared. For the first time, reinforced concrete will be used instead of masonry for a lighthouse tower in the Philippines. A budget of ₱60,000 was set for the construction.

A party of two Americans, one Spanish mason, and 40 Filipinos was organized in December 1904, and sent to this station, leaving Manila on December 29. On March 20, 1905, the party was increased to a total of 106 by the employment of local laborers. A dedicated sloop named Jervey was used in transporting laborers and water.

On April 1, 1905, a temporary fixed white light from a lens lantern was displayed from the highest point of Maniguin Island, at an elevation of 40 metres (130 feet) above mean high water. The light was visible all around the horizon, and in clear weather was visible at a distance of 21 km (13 miles).

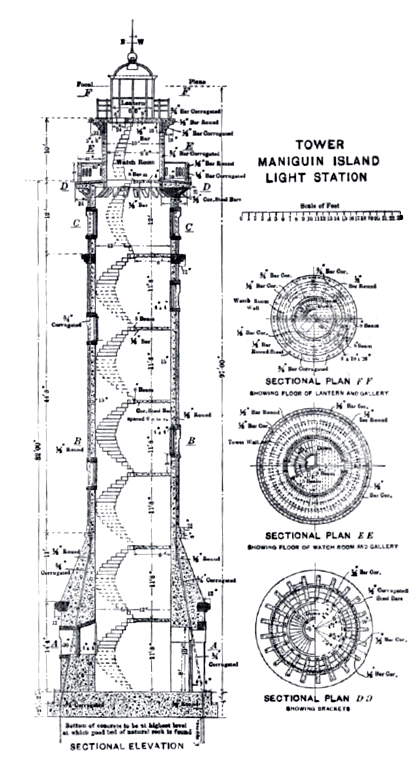
American design for the Maniguin Lighthouse, which was eventually constructed

Work on the tower was immediately begun after the construction of the temporary quarters. The dwellings and accessory buildings were also made with reinforced concrete. A contract had been let in Hong Kong for the iron stairs, which were delivered in August 1905.

On all previous stations, it has been necessary either to use materials purchased or plans prepared under the supervision of the Spanish Government. As this station was the first to be constructed throughout, construction was speedy and of a higher standard at a much lower cost. At the end of the 1905, the tower was constructed to the balcony, cistern built, foundation of dwelling finished, doors, windows, and louvres made.

Work was completed the following year and the fourth-order light was lit for the first time.

== Current condition ==
This American lighthouse was recently abandoned. The Philippine Coast Guard erected a new white tower powered by solar energy a short distance away from the original tower as a replacement.

== See also ==
- List of lighthouses in the Philippines
