= Magallanes, Sorsogon =

Municipality in Sorsogon, Philippines

Magallanes
- Municipality
- Municipality of Magallanes
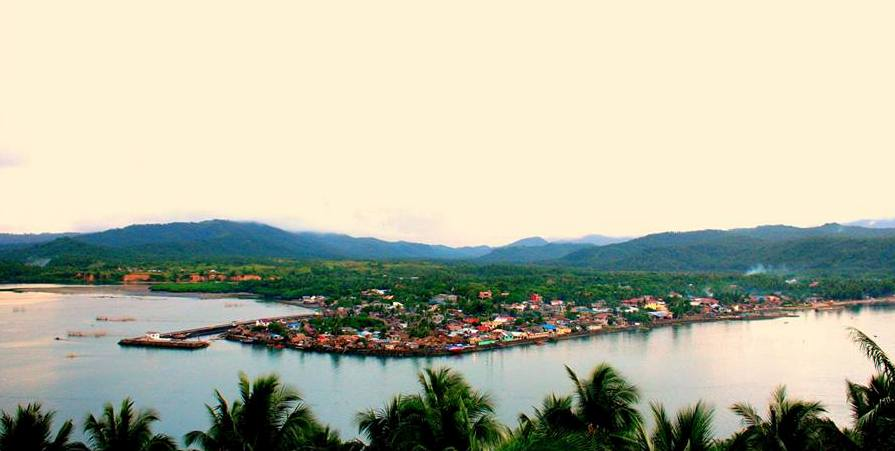
- Aerial view of Magallanes

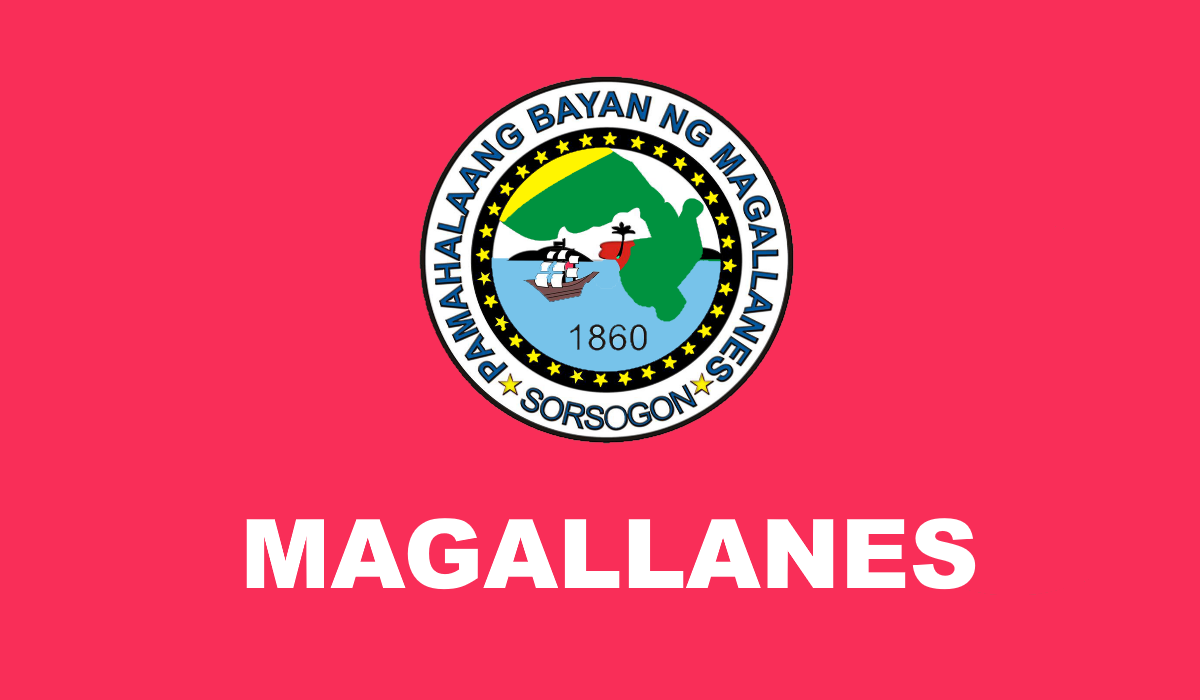
- Flag

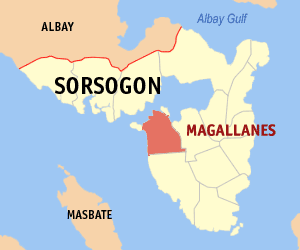
- Map of Sorsogon with Magallanes highlighted
- Interactive map of Magallanes
- Location within the Philippines
- Coordinates: 12°49′42″N 123°50′04″E
- Country: Philippines
- Region: Bicol Region
- Province: Sorsogon
- District: 1st district
- Founded: 1567
- Named for: Fernando Magallanes
- Barangays: 34 (see Barangays)

Government
  - Type: Sangguniang Bayan
  - Mayor: Maria Elena Ramona M. Ragragio
  - Vice Mayor: Augusto Manuel M. Ragragio
  - Representative: Maria Bernadette G. Escudero
  - Municipal Council: Members: Ruben L. Conda; Ralph Josef M. Carranza; Misael L. Mella Jr.; Roy C. Carrascal; Agnes D. Rebancos; Alfredo D. Camacho Jr.; Cielito L. Mortega; Cherry H. Malto
  - Electorate: 24,920 voters (2025)

Area
  - Total: 150.09 km^{2} (57.95 sq mi)
- Elevation: 24 m (79 ft)
- Highest elevation: 244 m (801 ft)
- Lowest elevation: 0 m (0 ft)

Population (2024 census)
  - Total: 38,072
  - Density: 253.66/km^{2} (656.98/sq mi)
  - Households: 8,393
- Demonym: Magalleño

Economy
  - Income class: 2nd municipal income class
  - Poverty incidence: 38.59% (2023)
  - Revenue: ₱ 215.3 million (2024)
  - Assets: ₱ 776.3 million (2024)
  - Expenditure: ₱ 189.5 million (2024)
  - Liabilities: ₱ 60.58 million (2024)

Service provider
  - Electricity: Sorsogon 1 Electric Cooperative (SORECO 1)
- Time zone: UTC+8 (PST)
- ZIP code: 4705
- PSGC: 0506211000
- IDD : area code: +63 (0)56
- Native languages: Sorsogon language Tagalog
- Website: magallanessorsogon.gov.ph

Magallanes, officially the Municipality of Magallanes, is a municipality in the province of Sorsogon, Philippines. According to the 2024 census, it has a population of 38,072 people.

According to renowned historians and anthropologists such as Domingo Abella, Luis Camara Dery, Merito Espinas, F. Mallari, Norman Owen, Mariano Goyena del Prado, et al., Magallanes was the location of the ancient settlement of Ibalong.

== History ==
In 1569, the Jimenez-Orta expedition landed at Barangay Ginangra near the village of Gibal-ong, the site where the first mass in the island of Luzon was said, the site of the first Christian settlement. Magallanes started as settlement called Parina, a name derived from the hardwood tree reputed to be so durable as to last for centuries that was known to abound in the place long before it became a barrio of Pueblo de Casiguran under the old province of Albay.

The settlement was not spared from sporadic sorties launched by punitive bandits from the south. In 1854 one group of bandits ravaged Barangay Ginangra and hostaged a family from the village. As a countermeasure, the Spanish Comandancia of Parina constructed a watchtower in strategic areas as Barangay Telegrafo and Bagatao Island equipped with cannons. A cannon also was mounted in Barangay Binisitahan del Norte at the mouth of the Incarizan River.

On July 16, 1860, the name Parina was changed to Magallanes in honor of the Portuguese who discovered the Philippines island in 1521 Ferdinand Magellan. Magallanes was officially declared a pueblo with Don Manuel de Castro as its first appointed governadorcillo. In 1864 the Parish of our Lady of Mt. Carmel was canonically established with Rev. Fr. Higino de Castro as its first pastor. It was during this year that the first census was conducted resulting to a total count of 1400 inhabitants. Moreover, the town was split into six "cabeseras" (headships) each of which was entrusted with the administrative supervision of a "cebeja de barangay" (literally translated, "eyebrow" of the barangay, but meaning the "overseer").

Pursuant to the decree of the Spanish Crown, new official with new corresponding titles were elected. Don Juan de Castro was chosen as the first Capitan Municipal in 1894. In 1901 the municipality elected its first set of official under the American. Don Inocencio M. Mella was elected Presidente Municipal under the Malolos Constitution.

== Geography ==
=== Barangays ===
Magallanes is politically subdivided into 34 barangays. Each barangay consists of puroks and some have sitios.

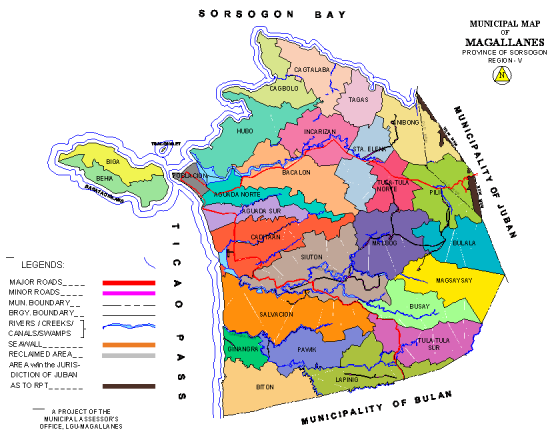
Map of the Municipality of Magallanes

- Aguada Norte
- Aguada Sur
- Anibong
- Bacalon
- Bacolod
- Banacud
- Biga
- Behia
- Binisitahan del Norte
- Binisitahan del Sur
- Biton
- Bulala
- Busay
- Caditaan
- Cagbolo
- Cagtalaba
- Cawit Extension
- Cawit Proper
- Ginangra
- Hubo
- Incarizan
- Lapinig
- Magsaysay
- Malbog
- Pantalan
- Pawik
- Pili
- Poblacion
- Salvacion
- Santa Elena
- Siuton
- Tagas
- Tulatula Norte
- Tulatula Sur

=== Climate ===
Climate data for Magallanes, Sorsogon
Month	Jan	Feb	Mar	Apr	May	Jun	Jul	Aug	Sep	Oct	Nov	Dec	Year
Mean daily maximum °C (°F)	27 (81)	28 (82)	29 (84)	31 (88)	31 (88)	30 (86)	29 (84)	29 (84)	29 (84)	29 (84)	29 (84)	28 (82)	29 (84)
Mean daily minimum °C (°F)	22 (72)	21 (70)	22 (72)	23 (73)	24 (75)	25 (77)	25 (77)	25 (77)	25 (77)	24 (75)	23 (73)	23 (73)	24 (74)
Average precipitation mm (inches)	65 (2.6)	44 (1.7)	42 (1.7)	39 (1.5)	87 (3.4)	150 (5.9)	184 (7.2)	153 (6.0)	163 (6.4)	154 (6.1)	127 (5.0)	100 (3.9)	1,308 (51.4)
Average rainy days	13.9	9.2	11.0	12.5	19.6	24.3	26.5	25.0	25.5	24.4	19.4	15.1	226.4
Source: Meteoblue

== Demographics ==
Population census of Magallanes
Year	Pop.	±% p.a.
1903	4,921	—
1918	10,012	+4.85%
1939	15,412	+2.08%
1948	17,982	+1.73%
1960	18,144	+0.07%
1970	23,896	+2.79%
1975	23,101	−0.68%
1980	25,765	+2.21%
1990	24,754	−0.40%
1995	28,707	+2.81%
2000	31,315	+1.88%
2007	34,418	+1.31%
2010	35,443	+1.07%
2015	37,038	+0.84%
2020	37,411	+0.21%
2024	38,072	+0.42%
Source: Philippine Statistics Authority

== Economy ==
Poverty incidence of Magallanes (%)

Source: Philippine Statistics Authority

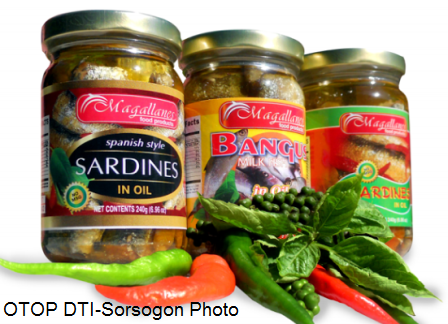
Magallanes Processed Products

Magallanes is primary considered a coastal town as 24 of its 34 barangays are situated along the coast with abundant marine resources, which the locals take to daily for food and livelihood.

Marine and fishpond fishing are the town's prime industry despite large agricultural lands being engaged as well in crop and livestock production. Fish drying is a common practice among the locals after which the produce is sold to neighboring towns. For the fishpond culture, they are able to produce milkfish, tilapia, prawns and mud crab. The variety of ways the marine and inland fishing produce are processed include sardine in oil, bangus in oil, dried posit, dilis tuyo, daing and tinapa.

Sardine and Bangus in Oil are OTOP products processed by the Magallanes Food Products while the dried and smoke fish are processed by the Bacolod Women's Cooperative and by the fish folks themselves.

Crops production of rice, corn, coconut, fruit trees, vegetables and root cops make an abundant produce for the town. Of these crops, coconut accounts about 96.15% making it the dominant major product.

== Education ==
There are two schools district offices which govern all educational institutions within the municipality. They oversee the management and operations of all private and public, from primary to secondary schools. These are the:

- Magallanes North Schools District
- Magallanes South Schools District

=== Primary and elementary schools ===
- Aguada Elementary School
- Anibong Elementary School
- Behia Elementary School
- Biga Elementary School
- Biton Elementary School
- Bulala Elementary School
- Busay Elementary School
- Caditaan Elementary School
- Cagbolo Elementary School
- Cagtalaba Elementary School
- Dona Olimpia. De Castro Mella Elementary School
- Eduardo Lee Chan Memorial School
- Fountain of Joy Christian Learning Center
- Ginangra Elementary School
- Hubo Elementary School
- Iluminado Carranza Elementary School
- Lapinig Elementary School
- Malbog Elementary School
- Magallanes North Central School
- Magsaysay Elementary School
- Pawik Elementary School
- Pili Elementary School
- Salvacion Elementary School
- Siuton Elementary School
- Sta. Elena Elementary School
- Sta. Lourdes Elementary School
- Tagas Elementary School
- Tula-Tula Sur Elementary School

=== Secondary schools ===
- Bagatao National High School
- Bartolome G. Lee Sr. Integrated School
- Biton High School
- Caditaan National High School
- Cagbolo National Vocational High School
- Magallanes National High School
- Magallanes National Vocational High School
- Pili National High School
- Siuton National High School
