= Capitancillo Island =

Island near Bogo, Cebu, Philippines

Capitancillo
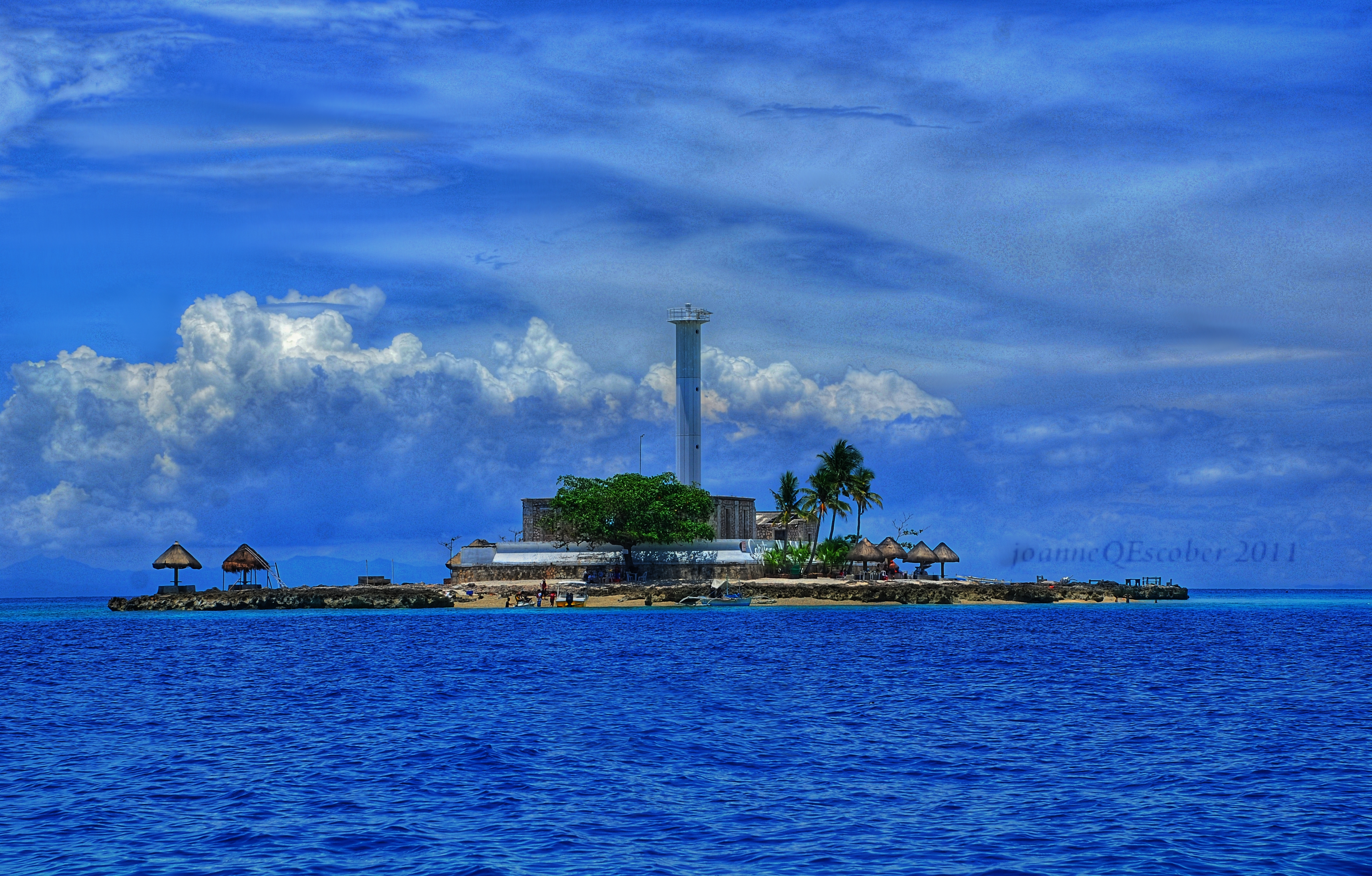
- The island in 2011

- Location within Visayas Location within Philippines

Geography
- Location: Visayan Sea
- Coordinates: 10°59′25″N 124°06′14″E
- Archipelago: Central Visayas
- Adjacent to: Camotes Sea
- Area: 600 ha (1,500 acres)
- Highest elevation: 4.5 m (14.8 ft)

Administration
- Philippines
- Province: Cebu
- City: Bogo
- Barangay: Odlot

Demographics
- Population: uninhabited
- Capitancillo Island Lighthouse
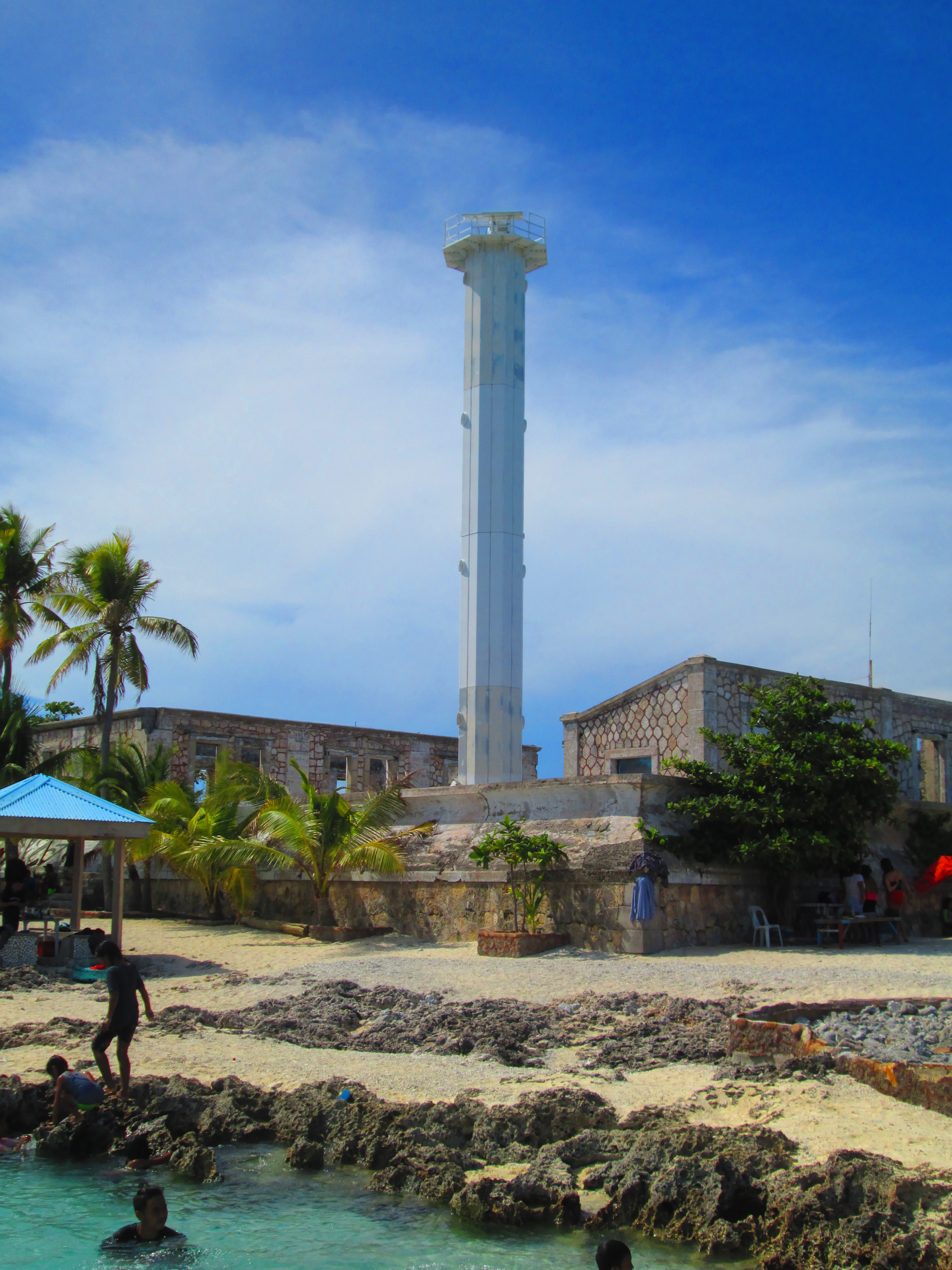
- Constructed: 1905
- Height: 25 m (82 ft), 83 ft (25 m)
- First lit: 1990, 1905
- Focal height: 30 m (98 ft), 98 ft (30 m)
- Range: 15 nmi (28 km; 17 mi)
- Characteristic: Fl(3) W 10s

Capitancillo (historically Islote de Capitancillo and variously Capitancillo Islet) is a small coral island (about 600 hectares in size) near Bogo, Cebu, Philippines. The island is a protected marine sanctuary, featuring three dive sites and a lighthouse.

== Etymology ==
Capitáncillo is Spanish for "subchief", from capitán ("captain") + -cillo (diminutive suffix).

== Location and geography ==
Capitancillo is a small, uninhabited island northeast of Cebu Island in the Camotes Sea. It is 6.1 kilometres (3.8 mi) east of Barangay Odlot proper in mainland Bogo City. Three areas around the island (Ormoc Shoal, Núñez Shoal, and the southwest wall of Capitancillo) are recognized dive sites. Polambato Port, Nailon Wharf, Marangog Cove, and Odlot Hideaway all serve as connecting points to the island from mainland Bogo, and the trip takes anywhere from fifteen to 45 minutes. There are no stores nor accommodation on the island.

== Lighthouse ==
The original lighthouse was listed in the Faros Españoles de Ultramar as one of 27 major lighthouses of Spanish Philippines. The Capitancillo lighthouse was built in 1905, with the current white steel tower dating to the 1950s. The tower is 83 feet (25 m) high, and flashes three white lights every ten seconds.

== See also ==
- Lighthouses in the Philippines
- List of islands in the Philippines
- Desert island

== Sources ==
- Lighthouse Explorer (2014). "Capitancillo Island Light". Archived from the original on 14 July 2014.
- National Geospatial-Intelligence Agency (2008). Sailing Directions (Enroute) Philippine Islands (PDF) (7th ed.). p. 183. Archived from the original on 2 April 2013.
- Philippine Daily Inquirer (12 August 2011). "Capitancillo: Cebu's new ocean leisure spot". Archived from the original on 13 August 2011.
- Rowlett, Russ (2016). "Spanish Lighthouses of the Philippines". The Lighthouse Directory. University of North Carolina at Chapel Hill.
- Sánchez Terry, Miguel Angel (1992). Faros Españoles de Ultramar. Madrid: Ministerio de Obras Públicas y Transportes (MOPT). ISBN 978-8474337921.
