= Apo Reef =

Coral reef in the Philippines

- IUCN category II (national park)
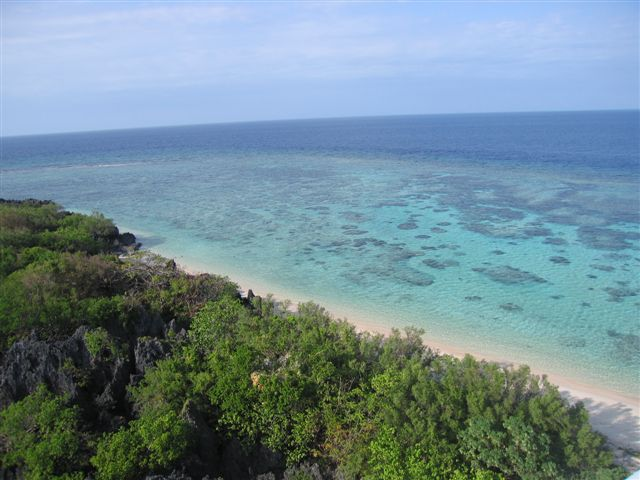
- View from the Apo Reef Lighthouse on Apo Island

- Location within Luzon Location within Philippines
- Location: Mindoro Strait, Philippines
- Nearest city: Sablayan
- Coordinates: 12°39′42″N 120°24′52″E
- Area: 34 square kilometres (13 sq mi)
- Governing body: Department of Environment and Natural Resources; Municipal Government of Sablayan

Apo Reef is a coral reef system in the Philippines situated in the western waters of Occidental Mindoro province in the Mindoro Strait. Encompassing 34 km^{2} (13 sq mi), it is considered the world's second-largest contiguous coral reef system, and is the largest in the country. The reef and its surrounding waters are protected areas administered as the Apo Reef Natural Park. It is one of the best known and most popular diving regions in the country, and is on the tentative list for UNESCO World Heritage Sites.

== Geography and environment ==
Apo Reef can is about 28 km (17 mi) west of the coast of Mindoro. It is separated from the main island by the Apo East Pass of the Mindoro Strait. Politically, the reef lies within the jurisdiction of the province of Occidental Mindoro in Region IV-B of the Philippines and, more specifically, of the Municipality of Sablayan.

=== Important Bird Area ===
The park has been designated an Important Bird Area (IBA) by BirdLife International because it supports a significant seabird population, with at least 10,000 breeding pairs recorded.

=== Reef system ===
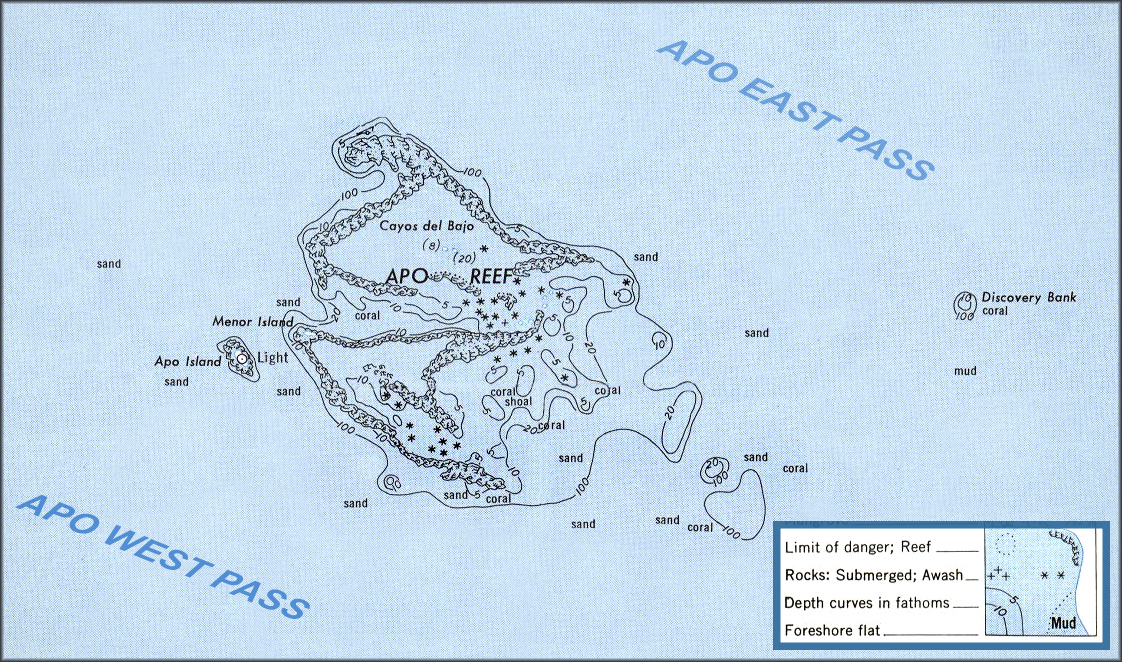
The reef system of Apo Reef in Occidental Mindoro

Apo Reef is a roughly triangular coral atoll formation approximately 26 km (16 mi) from the north to the south tip, and 20 km (12 mi) from east to west. It is separated by two lagoon systems, the north and south lagoons which are bounded by narrow reef platforms. It is 34 km^{2} (13 sq mi) of almost triangular northern and southern atoll-like reefs separated by a deep channel that is open to the west. The channel runs east to west from 1.8 to 30 m (6 to 98 ft) deep with a fine white sand bottom, numerous mounds and patches of branching corals under the deep blue water.

The north lagoon is an enclosed triangular coral reef platform partly exposed during low tide. It is relatively shallow with depths of about 2–10 m (7–33 ft). While the south lagoon is an inverted triangular coral platform enclosed on two sides and is about 30 m (98 ft) in depth. Likewise, reef limestone and coralline sand on the eastern and southeastern sides dominantly underlie the area.

Studies indicate that the modern reef has grown over an old reef formation during the last glacial cycle approximately 19,000 years ago. The surface morphology of the modern reef is a product of the fluctuating sea levels as the crust under Apo Reef subsides towards the Manila Trench.

=== Islands ===
The main geographical feature of Apo Reef is submerged, but three islands mark it on the surface: Apo Island, Apo Menor (locally known as Binangaan) and Cayos del Bajo ("Keys of the bank", locally known as Tinangkapan). The islands are uninhabited. Since the declaration of "no-take-zone" policy at Apo Reef Natural Park in 2007, only protected area personnel and members of the Task Force MARLEN (Marine and Apo Reef Law Enforcement for Nature), who are tasked to implement protection and conservation work at the park, stay in the protected area on weekly shifts.

==== Apo Island ====
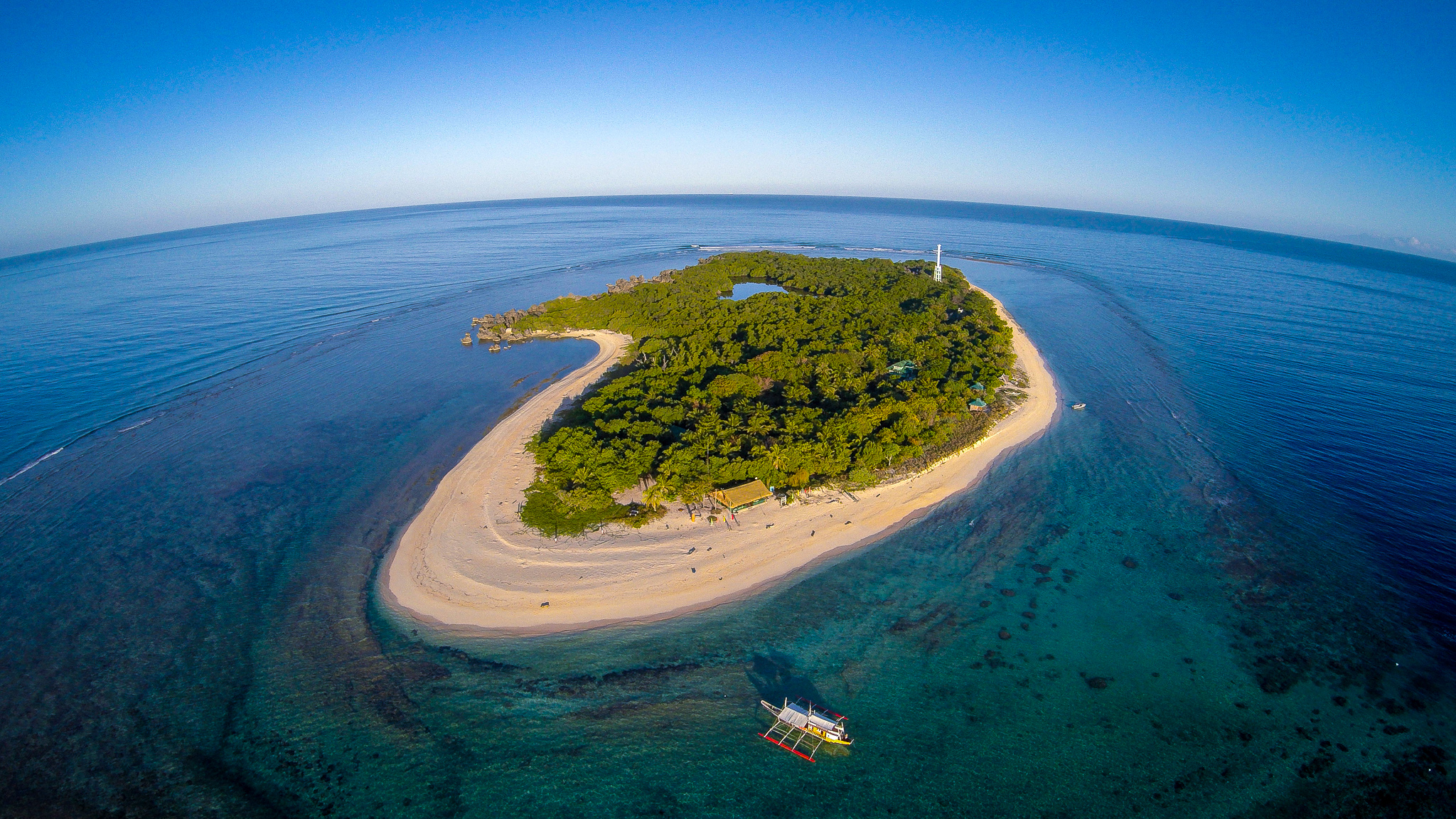
The largest island in the Apo Reef has a lighthouse, white beach, lagoon, mangroves, and karstic rock formations.

The largest is Apo Island at 22 ha (54 acres) with mangroves and beach vegetation. The reef surrounding the island extends to 1 km (0.62 mi) in places. Outside the lagoonal mangroves in the eastern and southern sides of Apo Island, the soil is sandy-to-sandy loam that has less silt and clay particles, while the lagoonal mangroves have a sandy loam to clay loam soil, underlain by decomposed plant residues or coarse materials.

Apo Island is separated from Apo Reef by a narrow, deep channel. The island is about 43 km (27 mi) from Mindoro and about 37 km (23 mi) from Nanga and Tara Islands, the nearest of the islands off Busuanga Island on the western side of the Mindoro Strait. The Apo Reef Light, situated on the north-east part of the island, warns ship about the location of this navigational hazard. The island is situated at a two-and-a-half-hour navigation 240° from Sablayan by pump boat (banka).

The island houses a permanent ranger base which monitors the national park. An administrative desk collects the environmental fees. It is possible to stay overnight in tents subject to certain conditions. Very limited facilities are available onshore to protect the island's fragile ecosystem.

==== Apo Menor Islet ====
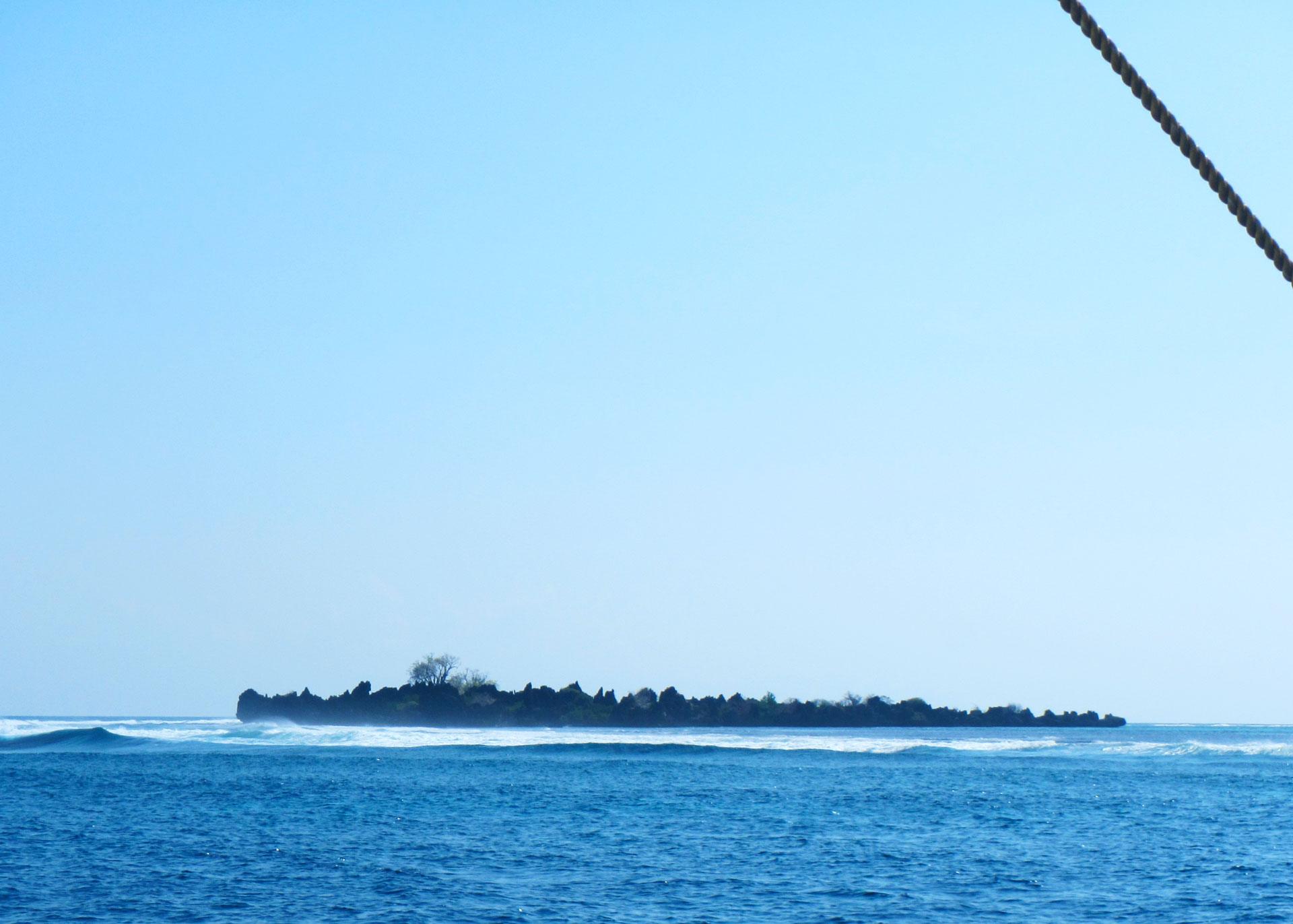
The Apo Menor Island is the second largest island in the Apo Reef and is primarily made up of rocks.

Apo Menor is located near the western end of Apo Reef, about 3 km (1.9 mi) east of Apo Island. It is a rocky limestone island with relatively little vegetation.

==== Cayos del Bajo ====
Cayos del Bajo are flat coralline rock formations with no vegetation on the northern lagoon near the eastern edge of the reef. At low tide, many small rocks are dry on the reef, particularly along its northern side.

=== Conservation history ===
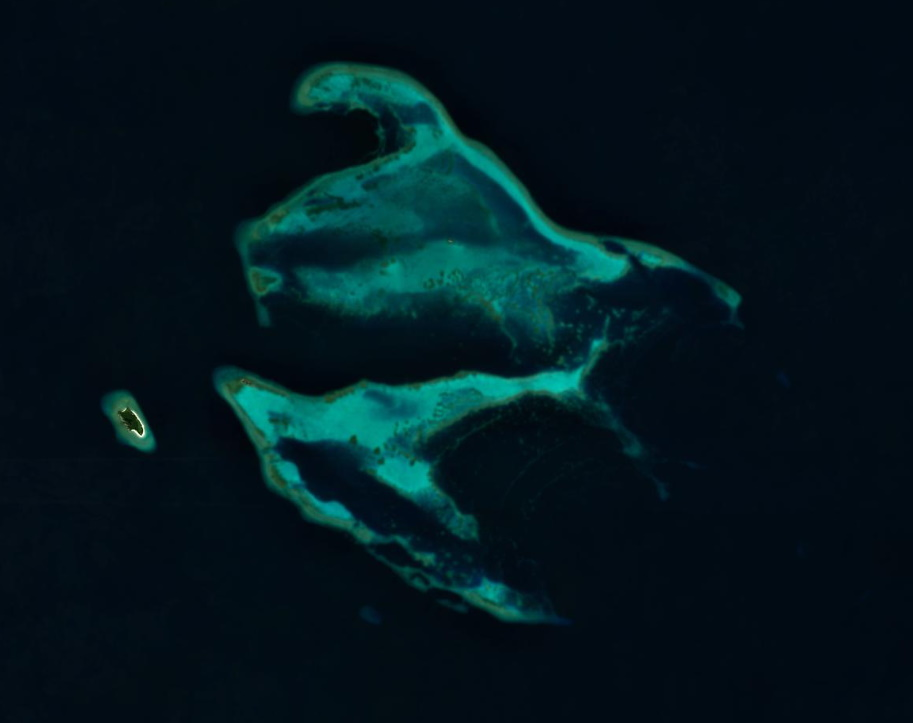
Satellite image of Apo Reef

The Apo Reef is a protected area of the Philippines classified as a Natural park encompassing 274.69 km^{2} (106 sq mi). Of the total area, 157.92 km^{2} (61 sq mi) comprises the Apo Reef Natural Park while the remaining 116.77 km^{2} (45 sq mi) constitute a buffer zone surrounding the protected area.

Prior to its declaration as a protected area, Apo Reef was first officially declared a "Marine Park" by then Philippine president Ferdinand Marcos in 1980. This was followed with the local government of Sablayan declaring the reef a special "Tourism Zone and Marine Reserve" three years later. In 1996, the entire reef was declared a protected natural park by then-president Fidel Ramos.

In 2006, the Protected Areas and Wildlife Bureau of the Philippine Department of Environment and Natural Resources submitted the reef to the UNESCO World Heritage Centre for consideration as a World Heritage Site.

Following a survey by the local chapter of the World Wide Fund for Nature, fishing within the reef was banned by the Philippine government in September 2007. The marine park opened for tourists to help generate funds for its protection as well as provide an alternative livelihood for hundreds of fishermen in the area.

Apo Reef was declared a national park under Republic Act No. 11038 (Expanded National Integrated Protected Areas System Act of 2018) signed by President Rodrigo Duterte in July 2018.

== Tourism ==
All people accessing Apo Reef need to pay an environmental fee. Tourist activities are administered by the local government of Sablayan and the local office of the Department of Environment and Natural Resources (DENR).

=== Scuba diving ===
The main activity of the reef relates to its underwater quality. Scuba diving and snorkeling in Apo Reef area are exceptional due to the quality of the flora, the fauna and the clarity of the water and white sand. Many species can be observed in deep or shallow waters in particular, sharks, giant napoleons, and manta rays.

=== Marine gallery ===
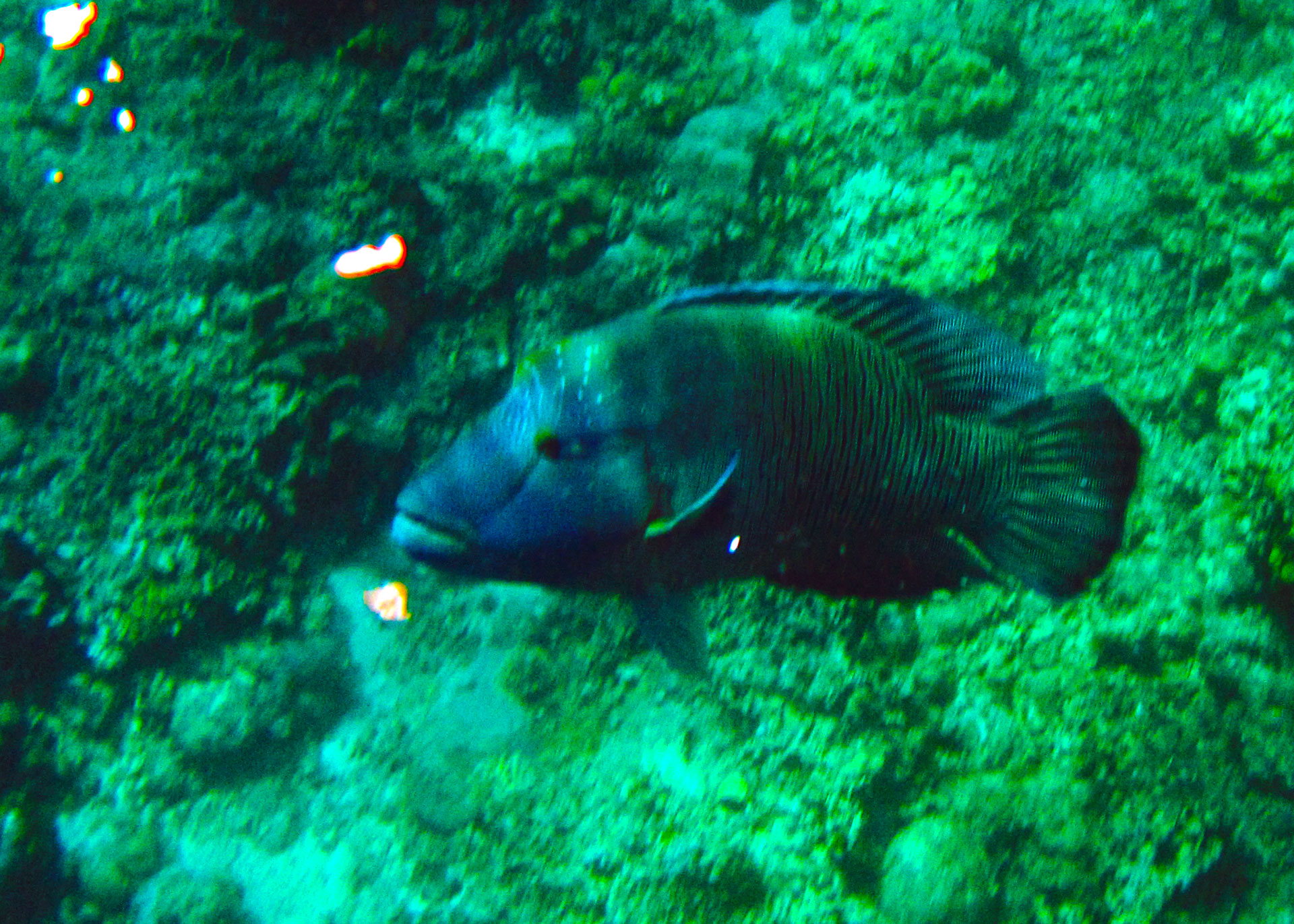
Giant Napoleon Wrasse at Apo Reef

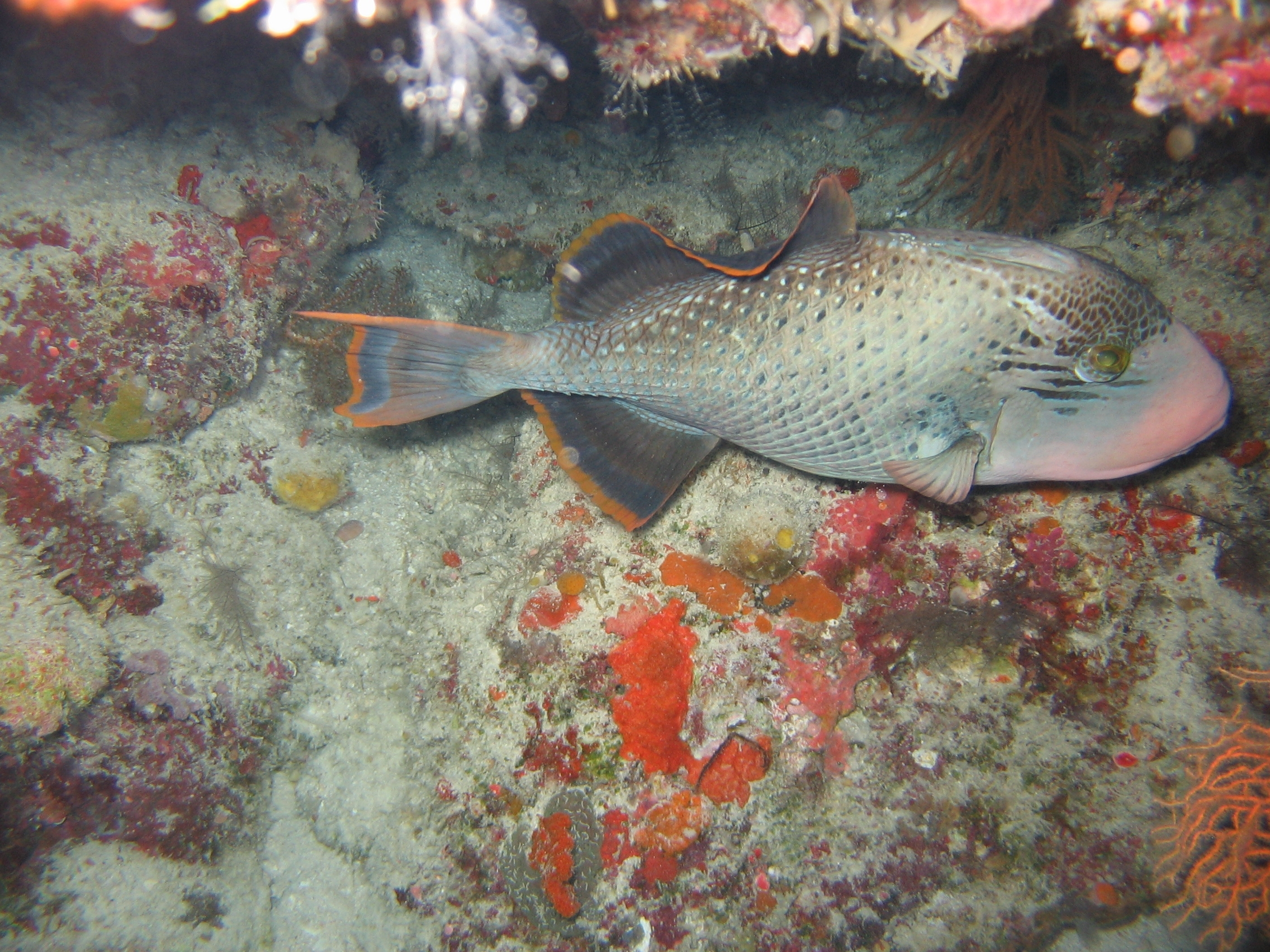
Yellowmargin triggerfish at Apo Reef

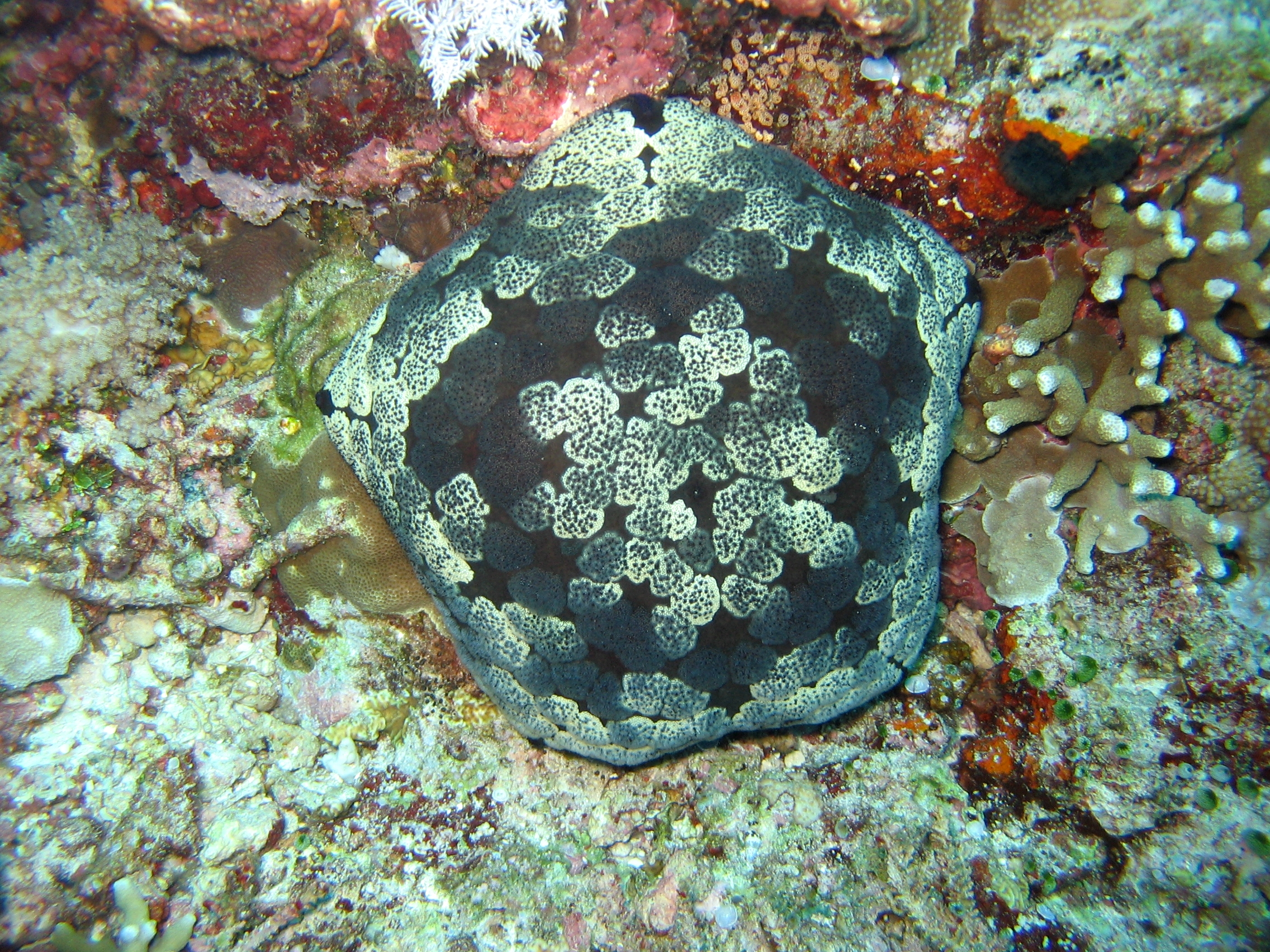
A cushion star at Apo Reef

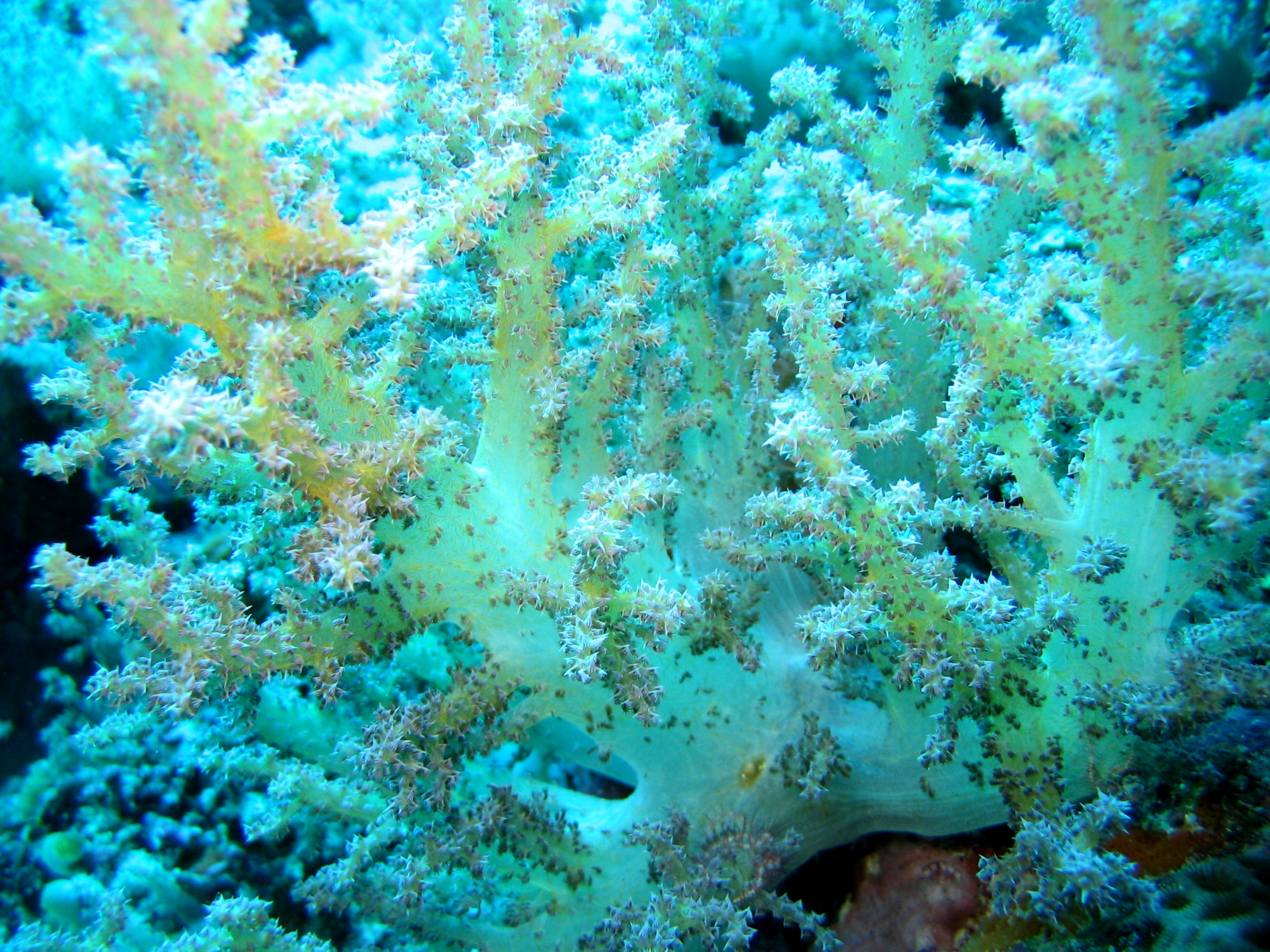
Yellowish white soft coral at Apo Reef

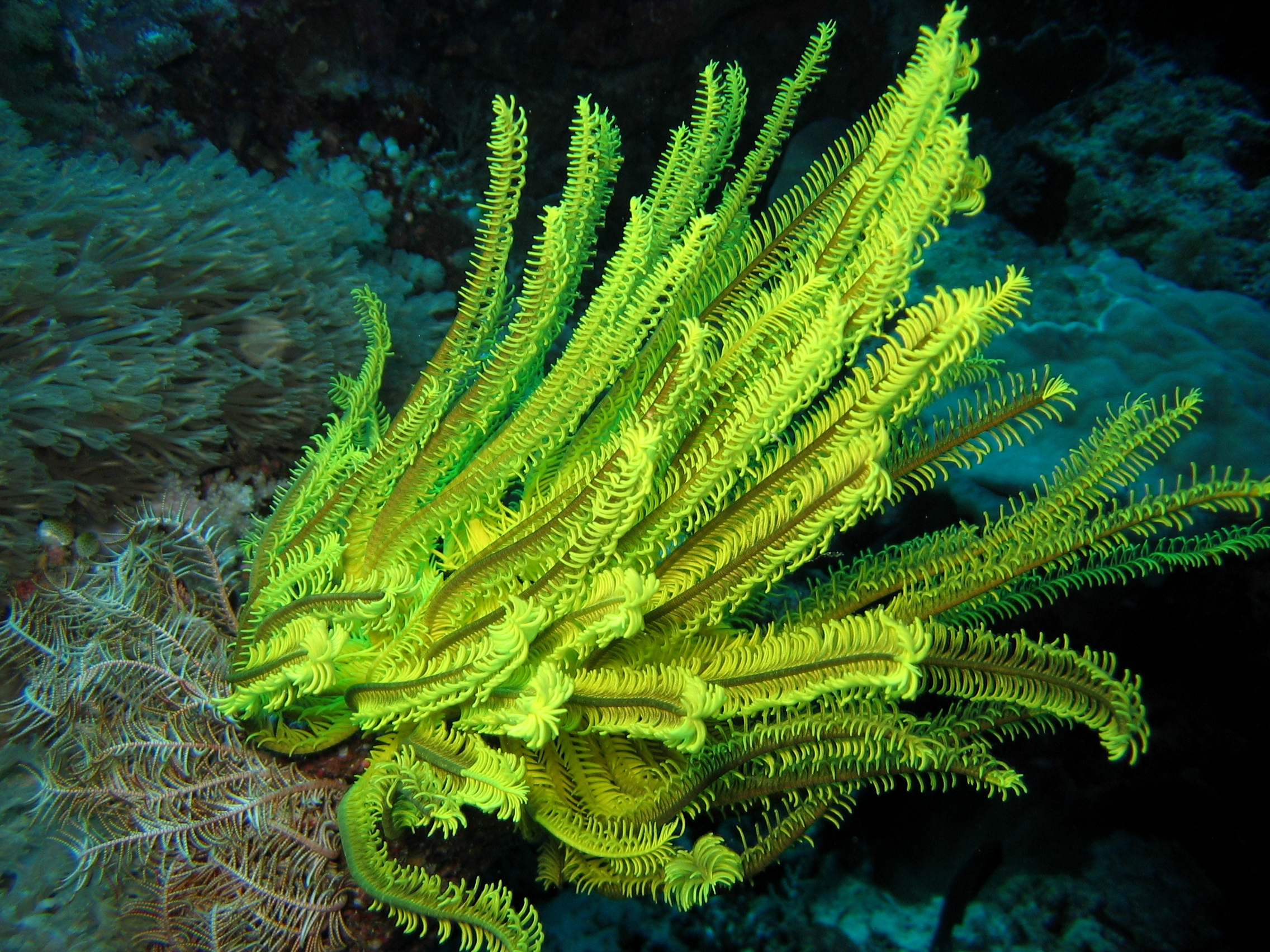
A yellow crinoid at Apo Reef

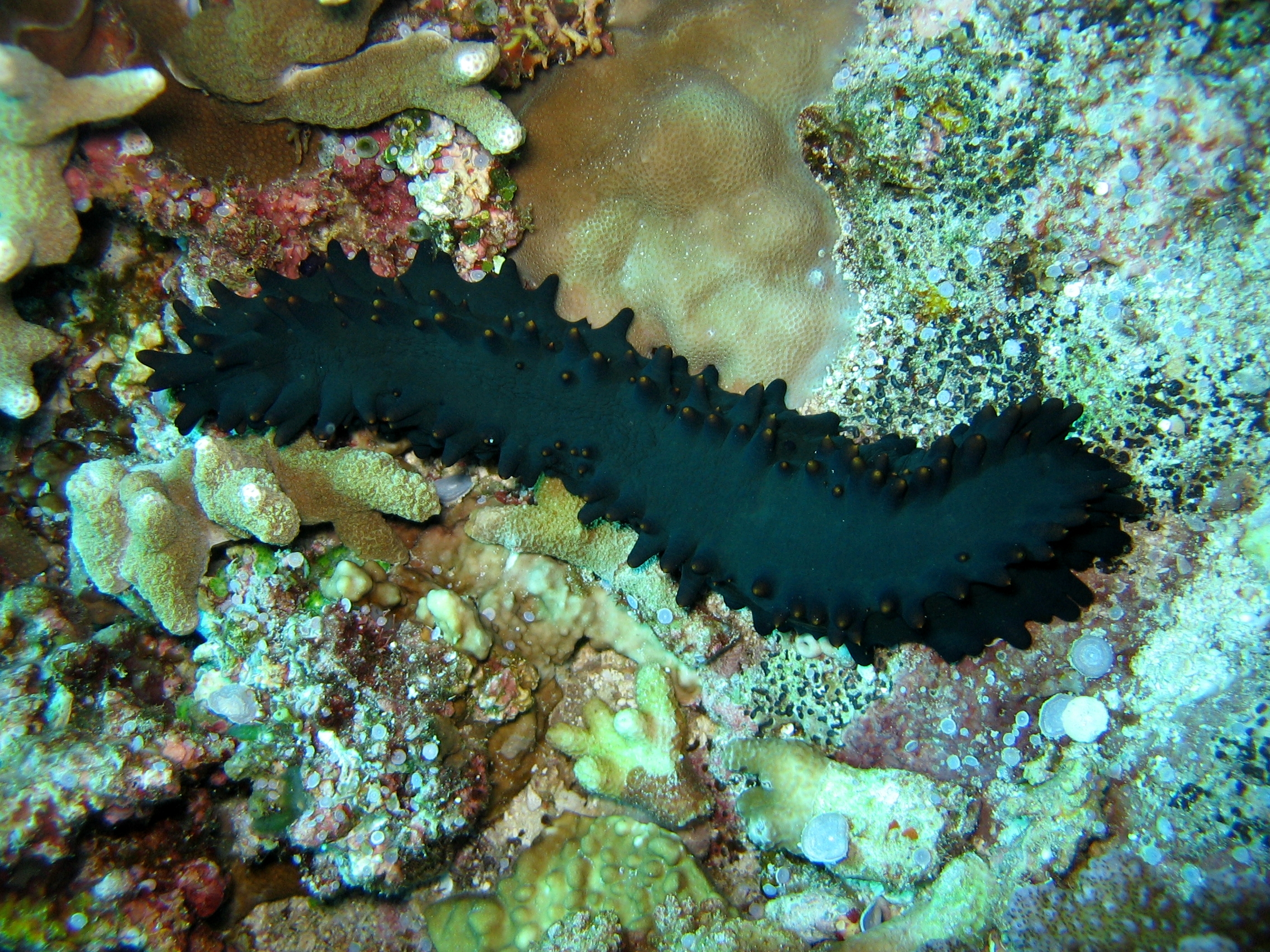
A sea cucumber at Apo Reef

== See also ==
- List of natural parks of the Philippines
- List of protected areas of the Philippines
- List of reefs
- List of World Heritage Sites in the Philippines
- Tubbataha Reef
- Verde Island Passage

== Bibliography ==
- Department of Environment and Natural Resources, Conservation of Priority Protected Areas Project, Apo Reef Natural Park Brochure. Sablayan, Occidental Mindoro; List of Proclaimed Marine Protected Areas; Protected Areas And Wildlife Bureau, 2004.
- "Apo Reef Marine Reserve". Local government-declared MPAs. Marine Protected Coast, Reef & Management Database. 2006-06-07.
