= Balabac Island =

Island in Palawan, Philippines

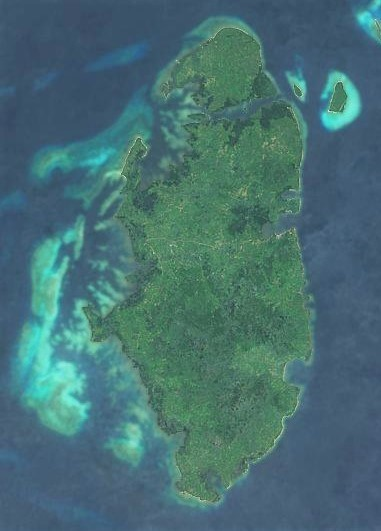
- Balabac island satellite image captured by Sentinel-2 in 2016

- Location within Palawan

Geography
- Location: Balabac Strait
- Coordinates: 7°56′31″N 117°0′29″E
- Archipelago: Balabac Group of Islands
- Adjacent to: South China Sea; Sulu Sea
- Highest elevation: 1,867 ft (569.1 m)
- Highest point: Balabac Peak

Administration
- Philippines
- Region: Mimaropa
- Province: Palawan
- Municipality: Balabac

Additional information

Balabac Island is the southernmost island of Palawan province, and therefore the westernmost undisputed island in the Philippines, some 50 km (31 mi) north of Sabah, Malaysia, across the Balabac Strait. Administratively, the island forms the main part of the municipality of Balabac and is divided into 14 barangays (the other six barangays of the municipality are on other nearby islands):

== Geography ==
=== Environment ===
Balabac is home to various endemic species, of which the Philippine mouse-deer is an example. The island has been designated an Important Bird Area (IBA) by BirdLife International because it supports significant populations of grey imperial-pigeons, Palawan scops-owls, Palawan hornbills, Philippine cockatoos, blue-headed racket-tails, Palawan tits, melodius and ashy-headed babblers, white-vented shamas, Palawan blue-flycatchers, yellow-throated leafbirds and Palawan flowerpeckers.

=== Demography ===
The Molbogs, a Muslim ethnolinguistic group, are concentrated on the island. Their livelihood includes farming, fishing and barter trading with the nearby Mapun and Sabah market centres.

== Historical and strategic context ==
The island borders the West Philippine Sea, a portion of the South China Sea, and therefore borders the area of the territorial disputes in the South China Sea among the Philippines and particularly mainland China, but also including the Republic of China (Taiwan), Vietnam, Malaysia, and Brunei. Balabac is about 140 nautical miles from Mischief Reef, termed Panganiban Reef by the Philippines, which the mainland Chinese government occupied in 1995 and subsequently turned into one of its largest artificial islands within what the Philippines considers its 370 kilometres (230 mi) exclusive economic zone. Balabac hosts Naval Station Narciso Del Rosario of the Philippine Navy and will host the United States Military under the Enhanced Defense Cooperation Agreement (EDCA).

The Balabac Military Runway (BMR) is a 3 km military runway with a P305 million concrete pier — along with a beaching ramp — at the Naval Station Narciso del Rosario. It is one of five locations covered by the expanded EDCA and is a part of the 2017 Tatag ng Imprastraktura Para sa Kapayapaan and Seguridad program to service military and civilian aircraft.

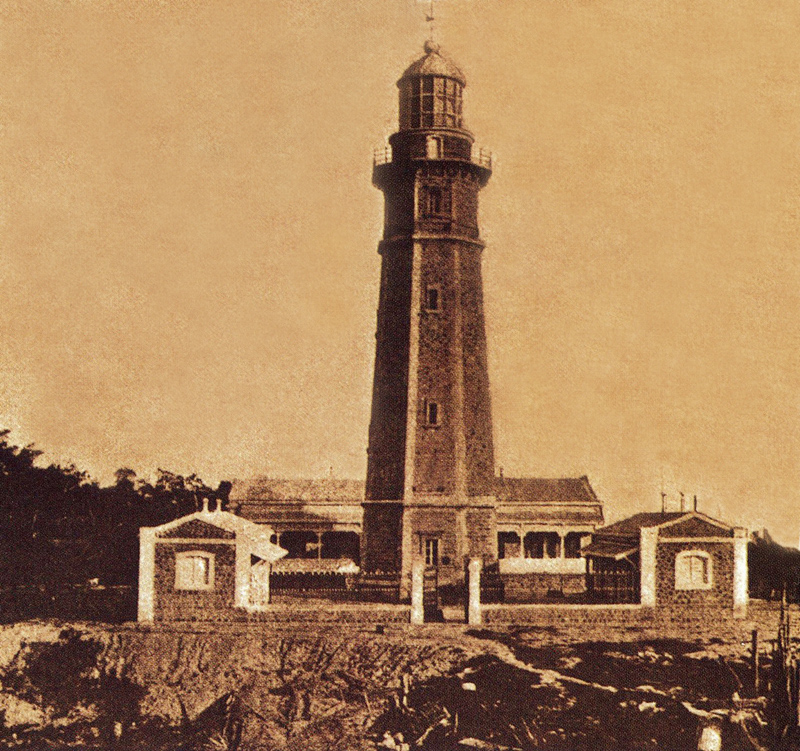
A 1992 photograph of Cape Melville Lighthouse, on the southern point of Balabac
