= San Bernardino Strait =

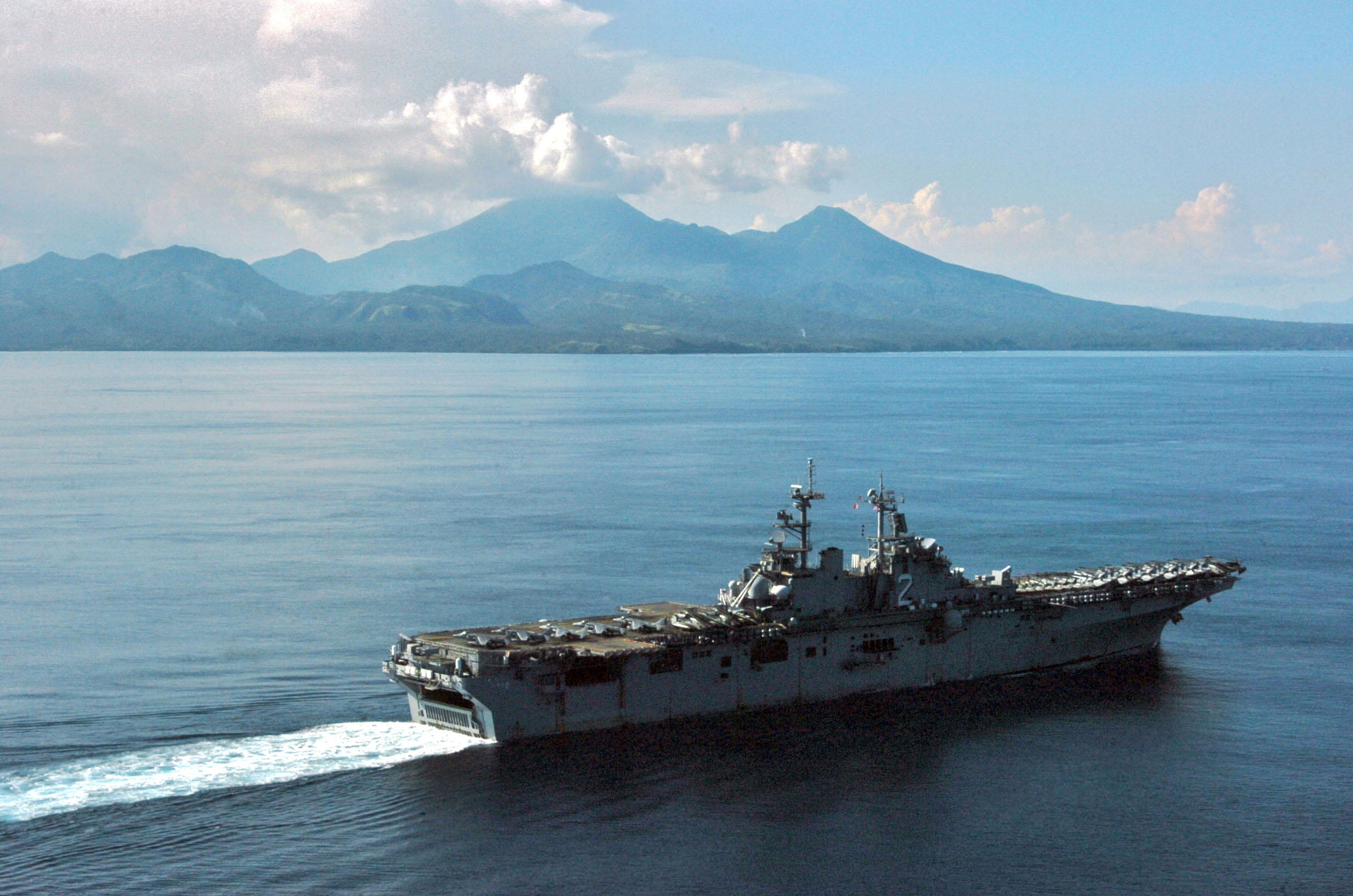
- USS Essex passes Mount Bulusan as it transits through the San Bernardino Strait.

- Location within Luzon San Bernardino Strait (Visayas) San Bernardino Strait (Sorsogon) San Bernardino Strait (Philippines)
- Location: Bicol Peninsula; Samar
- Coordinates: 12°35′15″N 124°11′47″E
- Type: strait
- Etymology: San Bernardino Islands

The San Bernardino Strait (Filipino: Kipot ng San Bernardino) is a strait in the Philippines, connecting the Samar Sea with the Philippine Sea. It separates the Bicol Peninsula of Luzon from Samar of Visayas.

== History ==
During an ill-fated expedition, only one ship, the little San Juan de Letran with a skeleton crew of only 20 men, logged more than 5,000 kilometres in Philippine waters, including those of the San Bernardino Strait, and the San Juanico Strait between Samar and Leyte.

The San Juan also completely circumnavigated the island of Mindanao, then tried to reach Mexico but was blown back to the Marianas by a storm in the North Pacific. It made its way back to the Filipinas (as Samar and Leyte had been named by Villalobos), and on January 3, 1544 ran aground in the treacherous currents of the San Bernardino Strait "just as dozens of Spanish vessels were to do for the next three centuries".

In order to guide ships traversing along the strait, the Capul Island Lighthouse was built from 1893 to 1896 under Francisco Perez Muñoz, following the designs of Guillermo Brockman in 1892. The Capul Island Lighthouse was declared as a national historical landmark by the province of Northern Samar on September 29, 2013.

=== Second World War ===
During the Battle of Leyte Gulf, Imperial Japanese Admiral Kurita took his main battleship force through the strait to reach the American transports anchored in Leyte Gulf, but withdrew after the Battle off Samar.
