= Henri Lamy =

French figurative painter (born 1985)

- Born: 1985 (age 40–41)
- Occupation: Painter

Henri Lamy is a French figurative painter.

== Early life and career ==
Born in 1985 in Lyon, he started painting at an early age after developing a fascination for facial expressions and people who were considered as not fitting in society. His work is characterized by heavy usage of lively colors and highly creative composition, as well as inventive usage of the palette knife. He began his artistic career as a member of the artistic squat 59 Rivoli, an art residence located in Paris, France. His work has been exhibited in many cities around the world such as Paris, Lyon, Geneva, Manila, Tokyo, and Hongkong.

== Art style ==
Lamy's work takes its cues from many prominent painters, most notably Jackson Pollock's use of drip painting. His style is also inspired by Yan Pei-Ming and Lucian Freud. Through this techniques, it may seem as though his work is abstract when viewed at close range but are actually figurative when viewed from a distance.

== Capoeira-Painting ==
Capoeira is a Brazilian art form which combines dance, rhythm and movement. It is a dialog between two players; a conversation through movement.

In 2014, Henri Lamy thought of combining his two passions: capoeira and painting to create a new form of expression, through movement and visual arts. Together with his wife Maïa d’Aboville, they have performed shows worldwide.

Henri Lamy opened this practice to children by creating kids workshops. This new art form is a simple and fun way of sharing creative energies and of expressing oneself through one’s body and senses. Henri has given free workshops for children in need from various NGOs from the Philippines such as Stairway Foundation (Puerto Galera), Project Pearl (Tondo), E. Zobel Foundation (Calatagan) and Museo Pambata (Manila) and Museo Sangbata (Negros).

== Taverne Gutenberg ==
In 2015, Henri Lamy and Maïa d'Aboville created Taverne Gutenberg in the city-center of Lyon, a creative hub that hosted art residencies, galleries, exhibitions, art studios, and a bar. From 2015 to 2018, it gathered over 40,000 visitors, 30 exhibitions, 400 participating artists, as well as 15 resident artists. The mission of Taverne Gutenberg is to promote emerging artists and to give an alternative space for the public to come and experience art and its creation.

In 2018, Taverne Gutenberg opened a new space called Les Halles du Faubourg, also in the city-center of Lyon, this time in an abandoned 1600 sq. meter factory, where art, culture, and science interact. Les Halles du Faubourg is an ephemeral project which will close end 2020, before destruction of the site.
