= Cape Santiago (disambiguation) =

Cape Santiago may refer to:

== Places ==
- Cape Santiago, the southernmost tip of the Calatagan Peninsula in Calatagan, Batangas, Philippines
- Cape Santiago (Taiwan), a cape located in Gongliao District, New Taipei, Taiwan

== See also ==
- Cape Santiago Lighthouse, Philippines, a lighthouse located on Cape Santiago, Philippines
- Cape Santiago Lighthouse, Taiwan, a lighthouse located on Cape Santiago, Taiwan
