= Claudia Hart =

American artist (born 1955)

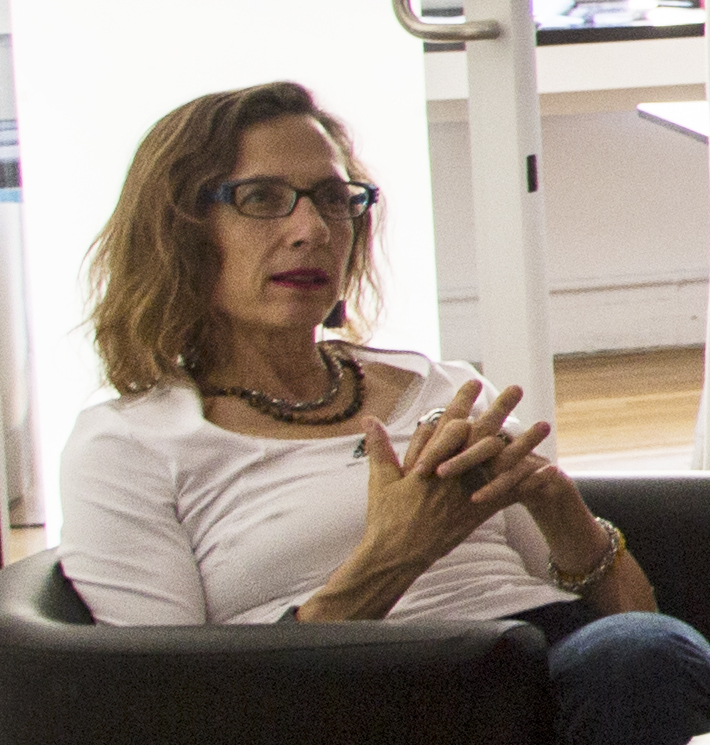
Hart in 2013

Claudia Hart (born 1955 in New York, New York) is an artist and associate professor in the Department of Film, Video, New Media, Animation at the School of the Art Institute of Chicago, Chicago, Illinois. She has been active as an artist, curator and critic since 1988. As a pioneer of media art, she creates virtual representations that take the form of 3D imagery integrated into photography, animated loops and multi-channel animation installations.

== Biography ==
After graduating cum laude from New York University with a BA in Art History in 1978, Hart studied architecture at the Columbia University Graduate School of Architecture and received a MS in 1984. She then practiced as an art and architecture critic. In 1985–86, she was associate editor of I.D. magazine (then Industrial Design magazine) where, along with the senior editor Steven Skov Holt, she redeveloped it as ID: the Magazine of International Design. She published her critical writings widely and went to Artforum magazine, where she was reviews editor until 1988. She continues to write critically but in the academic context, and continues to publish theoretical papers in academic journals such as Media-N, the New Media Caucus journal, Bad Papers and Byte Shark.

In 1988, Hart began to exhibit with the Pat Hearn Gallery, moving from critical to artistic practice. At that time, she exhibited paintings and installations inspired by the visionary architectural languages of Ledoux, Boullee and Leque. After receiving an NEA Fellowship in 1989, she moved her practice to Europe, where she lived and worked for ten years. She received numerous fellowships, including the Kunstfond Bonn, Stiftung Kulturfonds, the Stiftung Luftbrueckendank Grant, the Arts International Foundation Grant, the Kunstlerhaus Bethanian grant, an honorary fellowship at Eyebeam, and two fellowships from the American Center in Paris, where she met French conceptual artist Sylvia Bossu.

In Europe she exhibited widely with galleries and museums. Her work from this time has been collected by the Museum of Modern Art, the Metropolitan Museum of Art and The Vera List Center for Art and Politics at The New School in New York, M.I.T. List Center in Cambridge, Museum of Contemporary Art San Diego, Museum of Contemporary Art in Berlin, and the Goetz Collection in Munich.

Hart returned to New York in 1998 to publish two illustrated books, originally catalogs for her exhibitions. She wrote, illustrated and designed A Child's Machiavelli, published by Abbeville, Penguin and Nautilus, and Dr. Faustie's Guide to Real Estate Development, published by Nautilus. Hart then studied animation at New York University Center for Advanced Digital Applications with the intention of animating her illustrated books. Instead, she developed a body of work consisting of 3D-animated installations that she thinks of as temporal paintings.

Her contemporary art consists of designs for sublime landscape gardens often containing expressive and sensual female bodies meant to interject emotional subjectivity into what is typically the overly-determined Cartesian world of digital design. Her work has been seen at various public institutions including MoMA PS1 (New York), PS122 (New York), and biennial Zero1 (San Jose). She had the first one-woman show presented at the Wood Street Galleries in Pittsburgh. Her works are part of The Sandor Family Collection (Chicago), the Teutloff Photo + Video Collection (Cologne) and the Borusan Contemporary Art Collection (Istanbul) among others.

== Works ==
Hart's work applies a feminist perspective to a discussion of digital technology and a critique of the media. Much of her work attempts to introduce women into a male-dominated technological culture and condemn the violent impulses of a masculine digital production environment. In her artist statement, Hart says: "By creating virtual images that are sensual but not pornographic within mechanized, clockwork depictions of the natural, I try to subvert earlier dichotomies of woman and nature pitted against a civilized, "scientific" and masculine world of technology. In my own way, I am staging a romantic rebellion against technocratic and bureaucratic culture." Her practice is noted for alternatives to conventionally sexualized computer animation women.

=== Welcome to Alice's Giftshop! (2014) ===
In 2014, Hart held her third solo exhibition at bitforms gallery in Chelsea, New York. The works shown were inspired by Lewis Carroll's 1865 Alice in Wonderland and apply the metaphors in the text to explore the increasing mediation of contemporary life through digital platforms and technology. "I started working in a kind of hyper-feminine way," said Hart. "I was dealing with ideas of beauty in the context of first-person shooter games that were fast and violent and pornographic. In resistance, I started making slow sensual work, focusing on the female body." At the core of this work are issues of representation, as Hart questions what might be considered "natural", and the role of the computer in shifting values about identity and the real.

=== On Synchronics (2013) ===
On Synchronics is a media project Hart created in collaboration with 24 of her current and former students at the School of the Art Institute of Chicago. On Synchronics deals with the topic of individual identity in a media-saturated and increasingly technological environment. In the work, "many individual characters merges into a single global body, performing one unified, poetic choreography in which a digital avatar heroically wrestles to escape the confines of the artificial computer world an emerge into the unpredictable flow of reality."

=== Caress (2011) ===
Caress splits a reclining, life-size female nude into three video monitors. The framing of the body develops a sense of claustrophobia, depicting the figure as imprisoned by a kind of modern coffin. The black and white image is also intended to refer to tomb sculptures and the entrances to Gothic churches. The work was displayed in the bitforms gallery in New York.

== Exhibitions ==
=== Group exhibitions ===
- 2015: TechNoBody, Pelham Art Center, New York, NY
