= Prehistoric grave goods in the Philippines =

Survey of the ancient funeral practice

Grave goods are utilitarian and ornamental objects buried with the deceased. "Pabaon", as present day Filipinos know, is the tradition of including the priced possessions or items of the dead to its grave because of the belief that these things might be helpful to the deceased as it travels to the life after death. This has been a practice since the neolithic times.

Grave goods are symbol of social activities, and in a way reflects the urge of the people who buried the dead to show his or her social status. Grave goods provide substantial background on the technology, degree of complexity of the society, level of integration with other communities, social or group identities, individual identities, and concepts of wealth and power of the existing community.

The types and prestige values of the grave goods differ among groups, because of cultural differences. In studying grave goods, it is important to know the period of existence and to substantiate its prestige value.

== Grave goods through time ==
=== Early Neolithic Age ===
This period was centered on the population's needs. Thus, utilitarian objects, such as adzes, were most common among grave goods. Ornamental objects were shell pendants, ear ornaments among others. During this period, death was conceived as the transformation of physical form into something inanimate. Goods buried along with the body were mostly composed of their personal belongings.

=== Late Neolithic Age ===
Local trade can already be observed in this period. This created a diversity of material possessions of individuals, leading to a diversity of grave goods. Among these were jade and agate, and earthenware pottery. Other materials were shell and some foreign trade objects.

=== Chalcolithic (Metal Age) ===
During this period, inter-island trade was already prominent. Grave goods were jars, metal implements, alkali glass beads, imported porcelain and local imitations, tradeware, coins, metal accessories, gold, and shell. Sex differentiation was also evident during this period wherein it is one of the basic determinants of social stratification. This was a time when social roles started to have variations therefore allowed an individual to be identified in the society based on the goods included in its grave. Iron implements were most of the finds together with male bodies while glass beads were among women.

== Prestige value ==
The prestige value of grave goods are dependent on four factors:

=== Sources ===
The acquisition of the material is a factor on its prestige value. Materials that are harder to acquire, such as when the source is a remote area, the prestige value is higher.

=== Raw material ===
The abundance or rarity of the source of the raw material relates to its prestige value. The rarer the material is, the higher its prestige value.

=== Time and energy in acquisition and manufacture ===
Here, grave goods are evaluated on whether they are traded and reworked, traded, or locally produced. Traded items take more time to acquire, especially if these have to be reprocessed once acquired. Therefore, these items have higher values than locally produced items which are abundant and easier to acquire.

=== Cultural function ===
This categorizes grave goods as either utilitarian or non-utilitarian. Non-utilitarian or ornamental items have higher prestige value because these generally take more time to make, are harder to acquire and are not as abundant as utilitarian good which are seen and used in everyday living.

== Sites ==
=== Duyong cave, Palawan ===
A male adult was excavated in an open pit with stone and shell adzes. Ornamentations were shell disks with perforations near the ears and chest. Shells were of local material. Other materials were shell containers that are part of the areca nut chewing paraphernalia. This site was dated back to the Early Neolithic age, 4630 +/- 250 BP.

=== Manunggul cave, Palawan ===
This is a jar burial site where jade beads, jade bracelets, stone beads, agate bracelets, shell bracelets, shell beads, and highly decorated jars. This site was dated back to the Late Neolithic age, 2660 +/- 80 BP and 2840 +/- 80 BP.

=== Tigkiw na saday, Sorsogon ===
This is a primary burial inland site where eight burial jars were recovered, some with impressive design and some undecorated. Materials recovered were glass beads interred with females and metal implements interred with males. The site is of metal age, 200 BCE – 200 CE.

=== Maitum jar burials, South Cotabato ===
A lot of detailed anthropomorphic pottery in different types were found in this site. Materials found were shell bracelets, shell spoons, and metal implements such as daggers and bolos. This site is of metal age, dating 70–370 AD and 5 BC to AD 225.

=== Panhutongan, Surigao del Norte ===
This site consisted of sixteen dug-out wooden coffins in varying designs and woods used. Materials found were different varieties of metal implements such as bolos, metal spearheads and beads. This site is of early Iron Age, 140 +/- 340 CE.

=== Balingsagay, Bolinao ===
This site is a huge burial site where a total of 51 burials were found. Materials were same with the other sites, with the inclusion of a large amount of trade goods from china, especially porcelain. Local imitations of porcelain were also found. This site is of late 15th to early 14th century.

=== Puling bakaw, Calatagan ===
The grave goods found along with the bodies could be interpreted as a form of respect to the family of the dead (Barretto 2002). The family's grief was another probable explanation for high-valued goods. (Macdonald 2001)

This site best exhibited the extensive trade with other southeast Asian countries. From the 207 graves excavated, a large amount of Southeast Asian wares were found, along with materials existent in the other sites, but understandably with greater detail and variety. Extensive use of gold by all population was also exhibited. This site precedes the Spanish era.
