= Mark Dziersk =

American industrial designer (1959–2020)

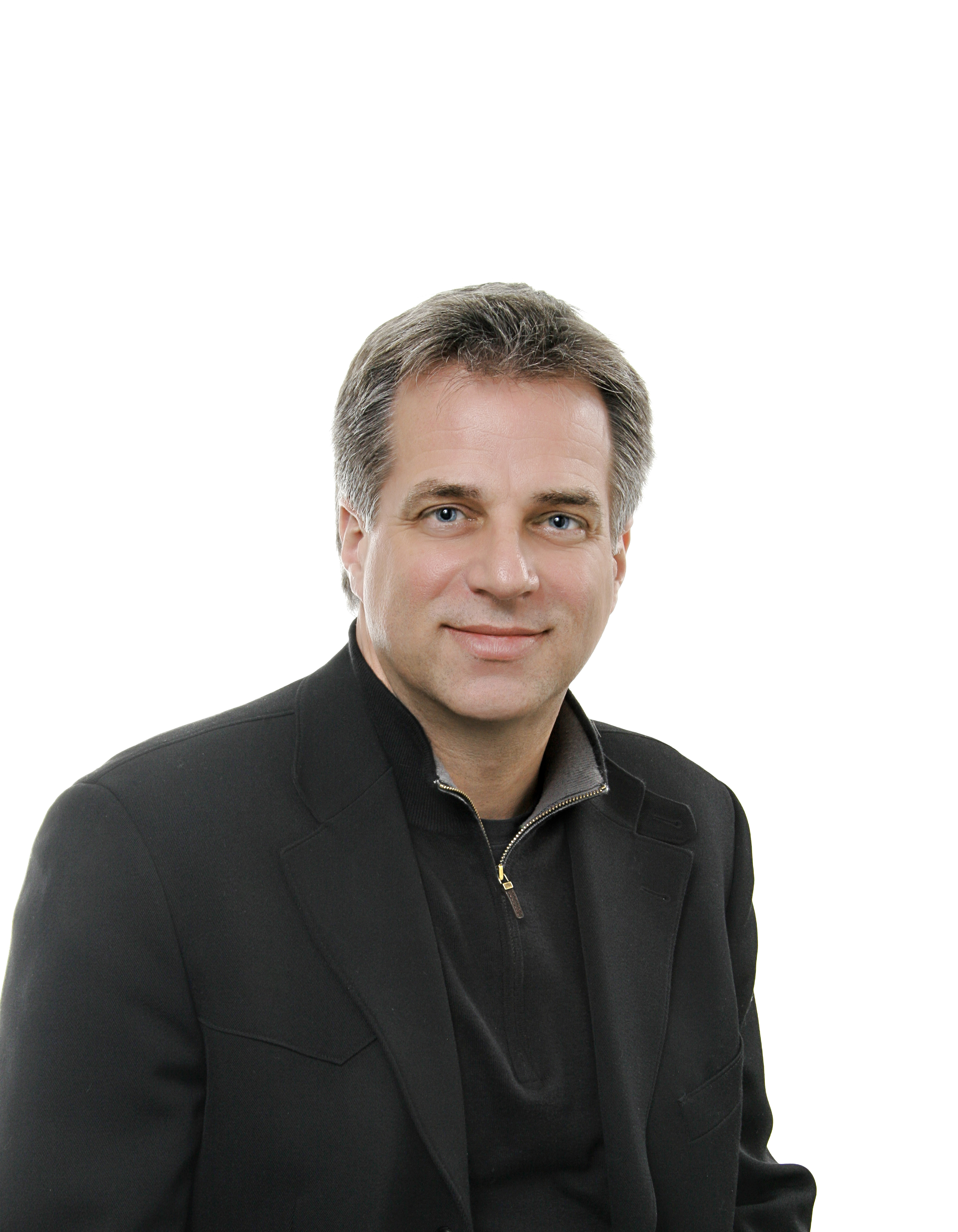
Mark Dziersk

Mark Dziersk (1959 – January 31, 2020) was an American industrial designer based in Chicago, Illinois.

== Biography ==
Mark Dziersk was born in Detroit, Michigan and graduated from the University of Michigan in 1981 with a Bachelor of Fine Arts in Industrial Design. He started his career at GenRad (formerly General Radio) in Massachusetts. Later he moved to his current home in Illinois where he lived with his wife, Elizabeth, and daughters.

Dziersk finished his career as Managing Director of LUNAR, in Chicago, and an adjunct professor for the Master of Product Design and Development Management Program (MPD²) at Northwestern University in Evanston, Illinois. Previously, he was Vice President of Industrial Design at BrandImage-Laga/DesGrippes in the Chicago area. Prior to joining BrandImage-Laga/DesGrippes in 2007, he was an Executive Vice President of Design at Herbst LaZar Bell, Inc. (HLB) for 13 years. While working full-time, he also served as the President of the Industrial Designers Society of America during 1997-2004. Prior to HLB, Dziersk was a Design Manager at Group Four for 5 years. Throughout his career he has been active in the design community. He has taught as adjunct professor at the Rhode Island School of Design in Providence, Rhode Island, and the New England School of Art & Design in Boston, Massachusetts in addition to his role as an adjunct professor.

== Awards ==
Dziersk received numerous awards for design innovations throughout his career, including a Gold Industrial Design Excellence Award (IDEA) for instrumentation; Gold IDEA for concept explorations; several Silver and Bronze IDEAs for consumer products; Best of Category and Design Distinction awards from ID Magazine's Annual Design Review. Other awards have included the Appliance Manufacturers Excellence in Design Award and numerous Good Design Awards from the Chicago Athenaeum Museum of Architecture and Design. Dziersk holds over 50 U.S. product design and engineering patents.

== In the media ==
Dziersk was considered an expert in design. He was published and quoted extensively in trade magazines and the business press, including Innovation Journal and ID Magazine; Time Magazine, The Wall Street Journal, USA Today, Boston Globe, the Chicago Tribune, Crain's Chicago Business, L.A. Times, the Washington Post, and many others. Dziersk lectured extensively around the world, including events at Northwestern University Kellogg School of Management, The University of Michigan, The MIT Sloan School of Management, The Columbus College of Art and Design, The Rhode Island School of Design, Southern Illinois University, and others. He was a regular contributor to Fast Company (magazine). In addition to broad press coverage of Dziersk's career, he was involved in numerous international design competitions, including serving as a juror in the 1999 LG Electronics Design competition, and the 1999 Samsung Prometheus Camera Corporation.

== Industrial Designers Society of America Involvement ==
Dziersk served the industry in many capacities throughout his career. He was involved in the Industrial Designers Society of America (IDSA) for nearly two decades, including positions such as National Design Management Committee Chairman, National Conference Chairman, National Secretary Treasurer, Executive Vice President, President National IDSA, and Board Chairman. He also served the Association of Professional Design Firms (APDF) in various Council & Board positions. Dziersk was nominated for the 2000 Cooper-Hewitt National Design Award, and in 2001, received the distinction of Fellow of IDSA (FIDSA). He also led the IDSA voting delegation to the 1999 International Council of Societies of Industrial Design (ICSID) Congress in Sydney, Australia.

== Publications ==
- Lockwood, Thomas (editor); Walton, Thomas (editor), 2008. Building Design Strategy: Using Design to Achieve Key Business Objectives, Allworth Press, ISBN 978-1-58115-653-9
- Cagan, Jonathan; Vogel, Craig M. (editor), 2001. Creating Breakthrough Products: Innovation from Product Planning to Program Approval, FT Press, ISBN 978-0-13-969694-7
- Postrel, Virginia, 2004. The Substance of Style: How the Rise of Aesthetic Value Is Remaking Commerce, Culture, and Consciousness, Harper Perennial, ISBN 978-0-06-093385-2
- Hannah, Bruce, 2003. Becoming a Product Designer: A Guide to Careers in Design, Wiley, ISBN 978-0-471-22353-5
- Skov Holt, Steven; Holt Skov, Mara, 2005. Blobjects and Beyond: The New Fluidity in Design, Chronicle Books, ISBN 978-0-8118-4765-0
- Armac, Allen, 2005. Mass Society and Mass Culture: Reinventing the Nobleman, BookSurge Publishing, ISBN 978-1-4196-2436-0
