= Sylvia Bossu =

French conceptual artist

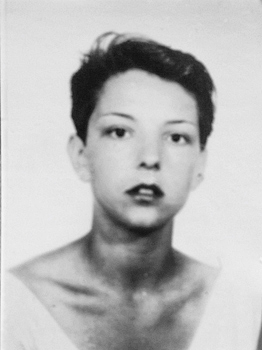
- Born: 20 June 1962; Saint-Rémy, France
- Died: 15 July 1995 (aged 33); Chamousset, Savoie, France
- Resting place: Rognaix, Savoie; 45.581862°N 6.452005°E
- Education: École des Beaux-Arts, Dijon
- Notable work: Immédiat (1988); Miroirs de courtoisie (1988); Films cousus (1992); La Mangeuse d'images (1992)
- Style: Found object, installation art
- Movement: Conceptual art
- Partner: Éric Colliard (1982–1995)
- Awards: Prix Évelyne Encelot Femmes & Art (2006)

Sylvia Bossu (20 June 1962 – 15 July 1995) was a French conceptual artist. She exhibited her works in Paris, Antwerp, Vienna, Munich and Berlin in the early 1990s, and died in a car accident in 1995, aged 33. Standing in the tradition of Marcel Duchamp, Bossu "used the language of the ready-made to construct machines that become metaphors for alienation, isolation, and death in everyday life."

== Biography ==
=== Early life and education ===
Sylvia Bossu was born on 20 June 1962 in Saint-Rémy, Bourgogne, to Émile Bossu and Angélique née Dedieu. She was the sixth child of a family of ten. Her father was a plasterer and house painter. She attended the lycée Pontus de Tyard in Chalon-sur-Saône. She left school at 16 and in 1979 entered the École Municipale de Dessin ('municipal school of drawing') of Chalon-sur-Saône.

In September 1981, Bossu entered the École des Beaux-Arts of Dijon, where she met the Chinese painter Yan Pei-Ming and the French painter and visual artist Cécile Bart. In January 1982, Bossu started a relationship with Éric Colliard, with whom she had a son, Adrien, born in 1993.

=== Career ===
Bossu had her first solo exhibition in October 1987. In January–February 1988 she presented the work Alimentation T 2 and, in November–December, Miroir de courtoisie 1. Bossu then worked in Sète, in the south of France, in 1989 and 1990.

In 1991–1992, Bossu went back to Paris and was an artist in residence at the studios of the American Center in the Cité des Arts, where she met the American artist Claudia Hart.

In the early 1990s, Bossu exhibited her works in Paris (MAM, January 1992), Antwerp (M KHA, February 1992), Vienna, Munich and Berlin. In 1993 she moved to Berlin, where she lived with Hart, and frequently travelled between Paris, Berlin, Antwerp and Vienna. In August 1994 she moved to Paris to live with Éric Colliard.

Bossu died in a car accident in Chamousset, Savoie, on 15 July 1995, aged 33, while travelling to the Festival d'Avignon. In 2006 she was posthumously awarded the Prix Évelyne Encelot Femmes & Art.

== Works ==
In Miroir de courtoisie 1 (1988) the spectator is invited to stand in front of a mirror to look at their reflection. As the spectator walks towards the mirror, a photoelectric cell triggers the flash of a camera, which saturates the mirror. The spectator, dazzled, cannot see their reflection.

In État de fait (1990), six desk lamps are pointed at the viewer while an answering machine plays beeps and fragments of innocuous sentences.

In Films cousus (1992) the projector produces the sound of a sewing machine while a film is projected, so that the projector seems to be sewing the film in front of the spectator.

In La Mangeuse d'images (1992) spectators are invited to watch their personal films one last time, then destroy them by feeding them to a shredder.

Au moment voulu (1995) is a meat grinder connected to a scale. When a person steps on the scale, the grinder cuts raw meat. The title is taken from Maurice Blanchot's novel Au moment voulu, in which the narrator describes a situation where he feels a will that goes beyond him and encompasses him.

In Elle est trop fraîche (1995) a scale lets out a cry of fright as soon as someone steps on it.

== Reception ==
The art critic Élisabeth Lebovici links Bossu's work to what Nicolas Bourriaud called esthétique relationnelle ('relational aesthetics'), with a particular emphasis on stress and discomfort.

In the magazine art press, Claudia Hart described Bossu's works as an existential search for the "raw, naked expression of human pain", breaking with the approach of "her master Marcel Duchamp". According to Hart, Bossu animated her ready-mades "by borrowing her machines from the everyday world, a sewing machine or a bathroom scale, and placing them in tautological arrangements that became metaphors of alienation, separation or death."
