= Lunar Design =

Founded in 1984 by Jeff Smith, Gerard Furbershaw and Robert Brunner, LUNAR (Lunar Design) is a product design and development consultancy headquartered in the San Francisco Bay Area. The company's provides industrial, interaction and communication design; video story telling, mechanical and electrical engineering, manufacturing support, user validation, design research, and need finding & assessment. Its current and past clients include Apple Inc., Abbott Labs, Cisco Systems, Hewlett-Packard, Johnson & Johnson, Microsoft, Motorola, Philips, Oral-B, Palm, Pepsi and Sony. On May 14, 2015, Lunar was acquired by management consulting firm McKinsey & Company.

Lunar Design partnered with Nova Cruz to design and develop the Xootr Scooter.

== Affiliates ==
LUNAR has offices in California, Chicago, and Europe (Munich, Germany). LUNAR Europe GmbH was founded in January, 2007 and is headed by Roman Gebhard and Matthis Hamann. The Chicago office was started in 2011 and is led by Mark Dziersk. In 2017, LUNAR Europe was rebranded as FLUID Design, a Munich-based UI/UX design agency in digital and product design. FLUID focuses on industries such as healthcare, data platforms, and smart home technology.

== Achievement and awards ==
LUNAR was one of the top five award-winning industrial design firms for over 10 years, according to BusinessWeek magazine. The firm has been recognized with accolades from the Industrial Designers Society of America IDEA Awards, Fast Company "Innovation by Design" Awards, Core 77 Design Awards, CES Innovations Design and Engineering Awards, iF Hannover Product Design Awards, and the ID Magazine Design Annual award, among others.

Two of LUNAR product designs for Oral-B and Philips were featured in the “Prototype to Product” exhibit in the United Airlines terminal at the San Francisco International Airport in 2007.
