= Malabrigo Point Lighthouse =

Historic lighthouse in Batangas, Philippines

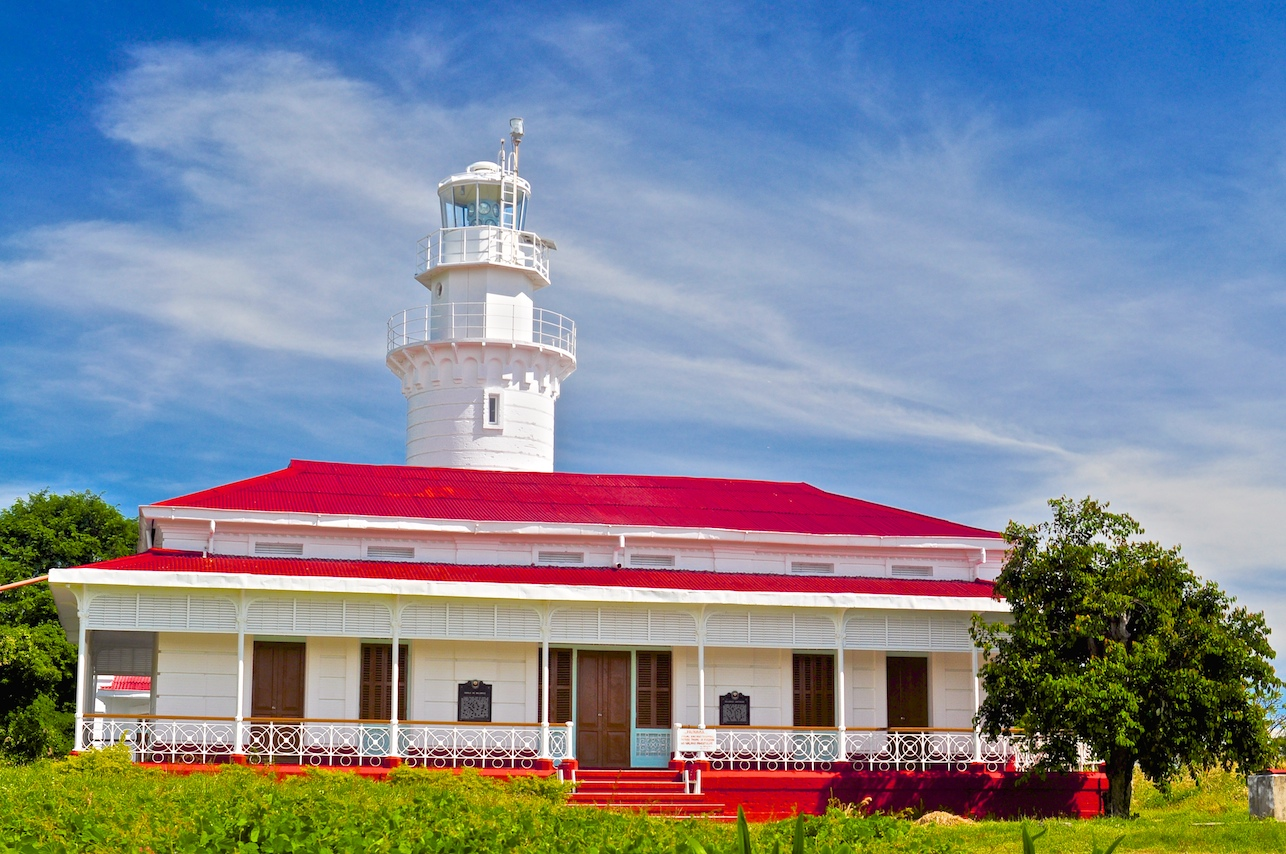
- The lighthouse in September 2013
- Location: Barangay Malabrigo, Lobo, Batangas, Philippines
- Coordinates: 13°35′55″N 121°15′45″E

Tower
- Constructed: 1891
- Construction: Brick and lime cement
- Automated: 1980
- Height: 17 metres (56 ft)
- Shape: Round
- Markings: Red tower and lantern
- Power source: solar power
- Heritage: National Historical Landmark

Light
- First lit: 1896
- Focal height: 56 metres (184 ft)
- Lens: First-order Fresnel lens
- Range: 28.71 kilometres (15.50 nmi)
- Characteristic: Fl (3) W 15s.

Malabrigo Point Lighthouse, also known as Faro de Punta Malabrigo (Filipino: Parola ng Punta Malabrigo), is a historic lighthouse located about 115 kilometres (71 mi) southeast of Manila in Barangay Malabrigo, Lobo, Batangas, Philippines. Completed and lit in 1896, it is one of the oldest working lighthouses in the Philippines as well as the best preserved lighthouse in the country. It serves as a guide for ships passing through the Verde Island Passage going to either Batangas Bay or Sibuyan Sea.

== History ==
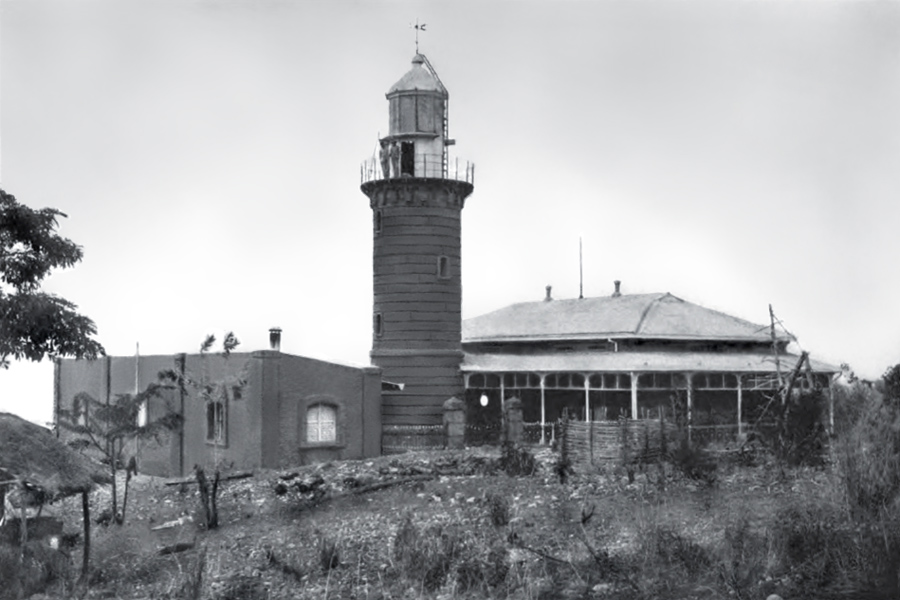
The lighthouse in 1903

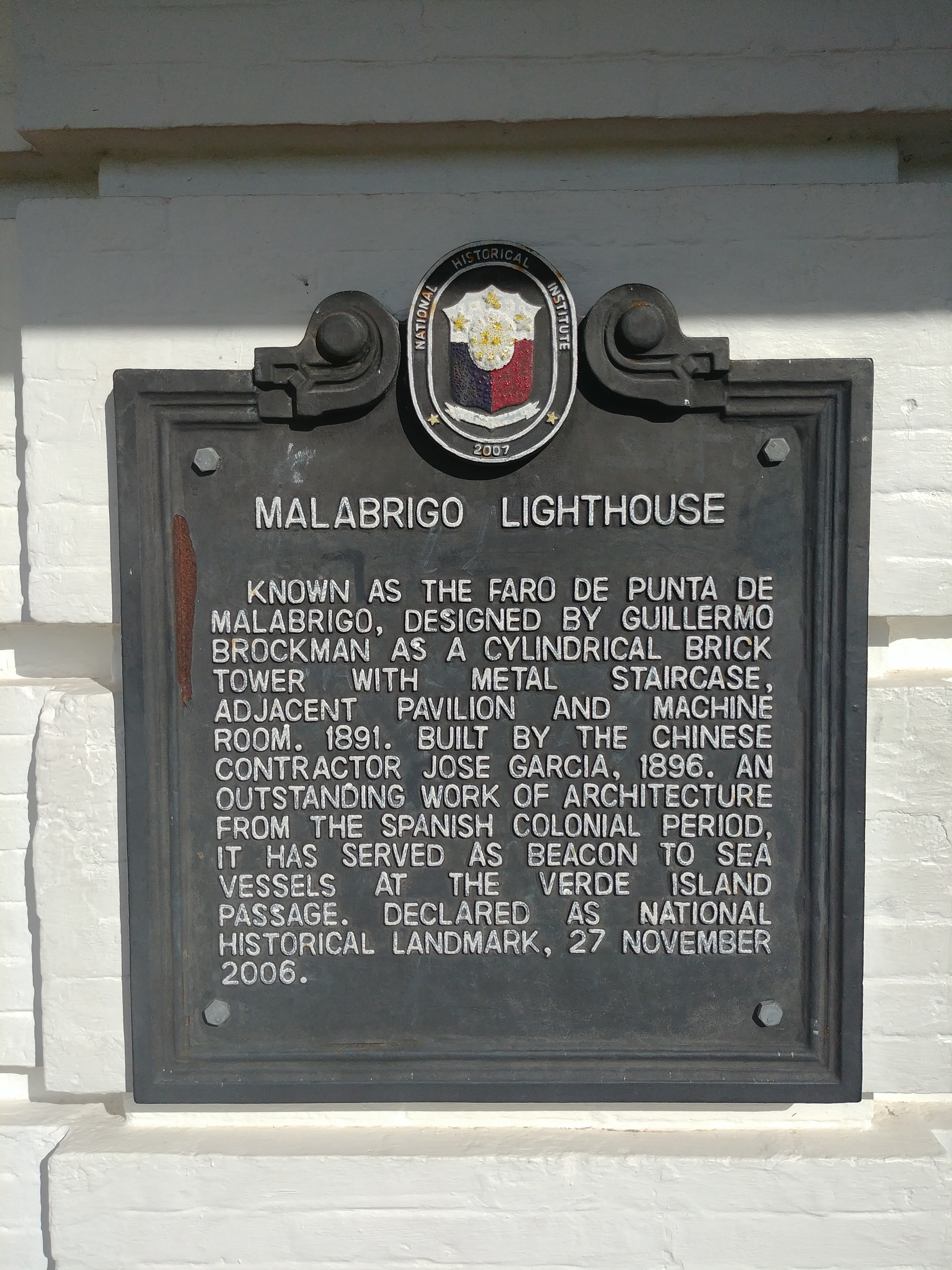
One of the two NHCP historical markers installed in 2007 designating the lighthouse as a National Historical Landmark

The Malabrigo Point Lighthouse was among the lighthouses constructed by the Spanish colonial authorities in the Philippines from 1846 to 1896 as part of the Plan General de Alumbrado de Maritimo de las Costas del Archipelago de Filipino (Masterplan for the Lighting of the Maritime Coasts of the Philippine Archipelago), the goal of which was to install 55 lighthouses all over the archipelago, including its remotest corners.

At the time, Malabrigo Point was considered a dangerous area among seafarers because of its rocky coastline and strong currents especially during the monsoon season, hence, its name which comes from the Spanish words mal abrigo, meaning "bad shelter." In 1891, Spanish engineer Guillermo Brockman, who also designed the lighthouses at Capul Island and San Bernardino Island, created a design for a lighthouse in Punta Malabrigo which consisted of a Victorian architecture-inspired cylindrical brick tower with a metal staircase and double balcony, lighthouse keeper's quarters, and machine room. The company of Chinese contractor Jose Garcia constructed the lighthouse out of brick and lime cement and completed it in 1896, with the lighthouse being lit for the first time on October 1, 1896.

After the American annexation of the Philippines in 1898, the management of the Spanish-built lighthouses in the country fell into American hands. From 1900 to 1902 — the height of the Philippine–American War — the American gunboat USS Villalobos, a former Spanish gunboat captured after the American annexation of the Philippines, guarded the lighthouse. The gunboat regularly patrolled the area around the lighthouses at Cape Santiago, Malabrigo Point and Cabra Island from its base in Cavite, maintaining a communication link with the Marines guarding lighthouses and keeping a sharp lookout for smuggling and trafficking of supplies to Filipino revolutionaries.

During World War II, the top of the lighthouse was damaged by machine gun fire from advancing American forces who thought it was being used as a Japanese garrison. After the war, the Philippine Coast Guard (PCG) and the Department of Public Works and Highways repaired the lighthouse.

In 1980, the lighthouse was automated following the replacement of its damaged lens with a light bulb donated by the Japan International Cooperation Agency (JICA). The bulb has since been replaced with a modern, solar-powered halogen light purchased through a loan grant by JICA and installed by the PCG in 1994.

In 2004, Olympic swimmer Akiko Thomson formed the nonprofit group Friends of Malabrigo, which signed an agreement with the PCG allowing them to develop and preserve the lighthouse into a sports and ecotourism site where youth swimming and sailing competitions as well as ecological and tourism-related activities will be held. However, these plans did not materialize. On November 27, 2006, the National Historical Commission of the Philippines installed two historical markers in Filipino and English, designating it a National Historical Landmark.

The municipality of Lobo, where the lighthouse is located, signed an agreement with the PCG to adopt the lighthouse in 2014 and began renovating and repainting the structure, and has since become the best preserved lighthouse in the country. In 2016, the PCG named its second Parola-class patrol vessel BRP Malabrigo after the lighthouse.

== In popular media ==
The Malabrigo Point Lighthouse has been the site of filming for a number of Filipino movies and televisions shows, including the 1975 film Ibong Lukaret starring Vilma Santos and the 2018 ABS-CBN afternoon soap opera Precious Hearts Romances Presents: Araw Gabi starring JM De Guzman and Barbie Imperial. In 2006, a film crew that conducted an unauthorized shoot caused minor damage to the lighthouse, leading the NHCP to declare it a National Historical Landmark to protect the site. The PCG and the local government now prohibits filming within the site without a permit from the Mayor's Office.

== See also ==
- List of lighthouses in the Philippines
- Lobo, Batangas
- BRP Malabrigo (MRRV-4402)
