= Cécile Bart =

French visual artist (born 1958)

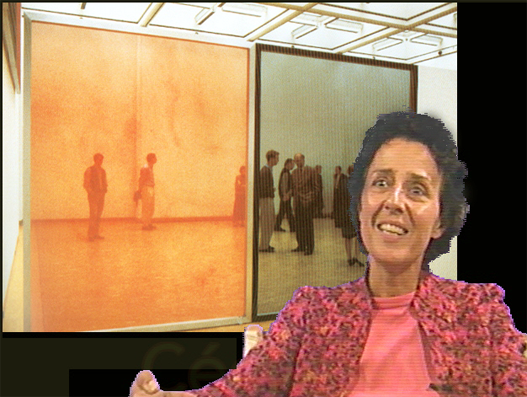
- Born: 1958
- Occupations: Painter, installation artist, visual artist
- Website: www.cecilebart.com

Cécile Bart (born 1958) is a French painter and visual artist. She lives and works in Marsannay-la-Côte.

== Life ==
Cécile Bart was born in Dijon, Côte-d'Or. She enrolled in the École des Beaux-Arts of Dijon in September 1982, where she met French conceptual artist Sylvia Bossu. For her early work, she projected light on transparent sailing screens. The vocabulary of Bart is projection of color in places, transparent screens that receive and diffuse the light, with the visitor being part of the devices. Her works are created according to the space in which they are presented.

She uses as a manufacturing process a veil of Tergal that takes on a color with a brush. Depending on the number of layers, the color increases in intensity and becomes material. The veil is then stretched on an aluminum frame.

For Musée d'Art Contemporain du Val-de-Marne, she offered five color elements with as many frames. The visitor fits in the frame, so in the painting, and becomes surface that receives the color.

In 2004, Bart used fabric, for Toros, Lisses and Coulisses, sort of curtains alternating between open and closed. She also used the projection of films or photos.

In 2017, Bart offered silent show at the Centre de création contemporaine Olivier Debré. This time, she used for this installation, painting, cinema and dance. Dance sequences were projected on nine screens. The exhibition was silent. The bodies of the visitors mingle with the projected bodies. The image is split and set in motion. Here, the room is plunged into darkness. As in Bart's previous works, natural light played an important role.

== Public collections ==
- 1% for the CASS (Health and Social Action Fund) of Ivry-sur-Seine, new construction of architects XTU Paris, 2008
- Red painting, blue yard, Lycée Jean Vilar, Villeneuve-les-Avignon, 2007
- The Two Ladies, installation, 2005, Dijon, Dijon Museum of Fine Arts
- And rain, the sun, Maison d'enfants l'Arc-en-Ciel, Thiers, New Sponsors program of the Fondation de France, 2001-2003
- Accompanying Painting, Saint-Joseph and Saint-Luc Hospital, Lyon, 1998-2001
- Painting / screen under glass, University Library Nancy II, 1995
- Profiles (3), consisting of five square format frames, Frac Bretagne, 2001

== Exhibitions ==
- 2010
  - The hypothesis of the lost ground, Cécile Bart, Concrete art space, Mouans castle, Mouans-Sartoux (Alpes-Maritimes)
  - Opening, poetics of the various: Rennes (France), Frac Bretagne, 5 July 2012 – 8 July 2012
- 2013
  - Engine, seven transparent screen paintings suspended from the vaults of the chapel Jeanne d'Arc in Thouars.
- 2017
  - Silent show, CCCOD, Tours
- 2018-2019
  - Winter effect, FRAC Bretagne, Rennes
- 2020
  - Rose Gold, FRAC Franche-Comté, Besançon

== Sources ==
- 9 paren,1996, Livre-objet. (Livre d'artiste)
- Cécile Bart. Plein Jour, Les presses du réel, collection Art contemporain, Dijon, 2008, ISBN 978-2-84066-259-4
- Cécile Bart, Et pluie le soleil!, art3 (Valence), 2007, ISBN 978-2-912342-32-4
