= Cape Santiago Lighthouse, Philippines =

Historic lighthouse in Batangas, Philippines

Cape Santiago Lighthouse
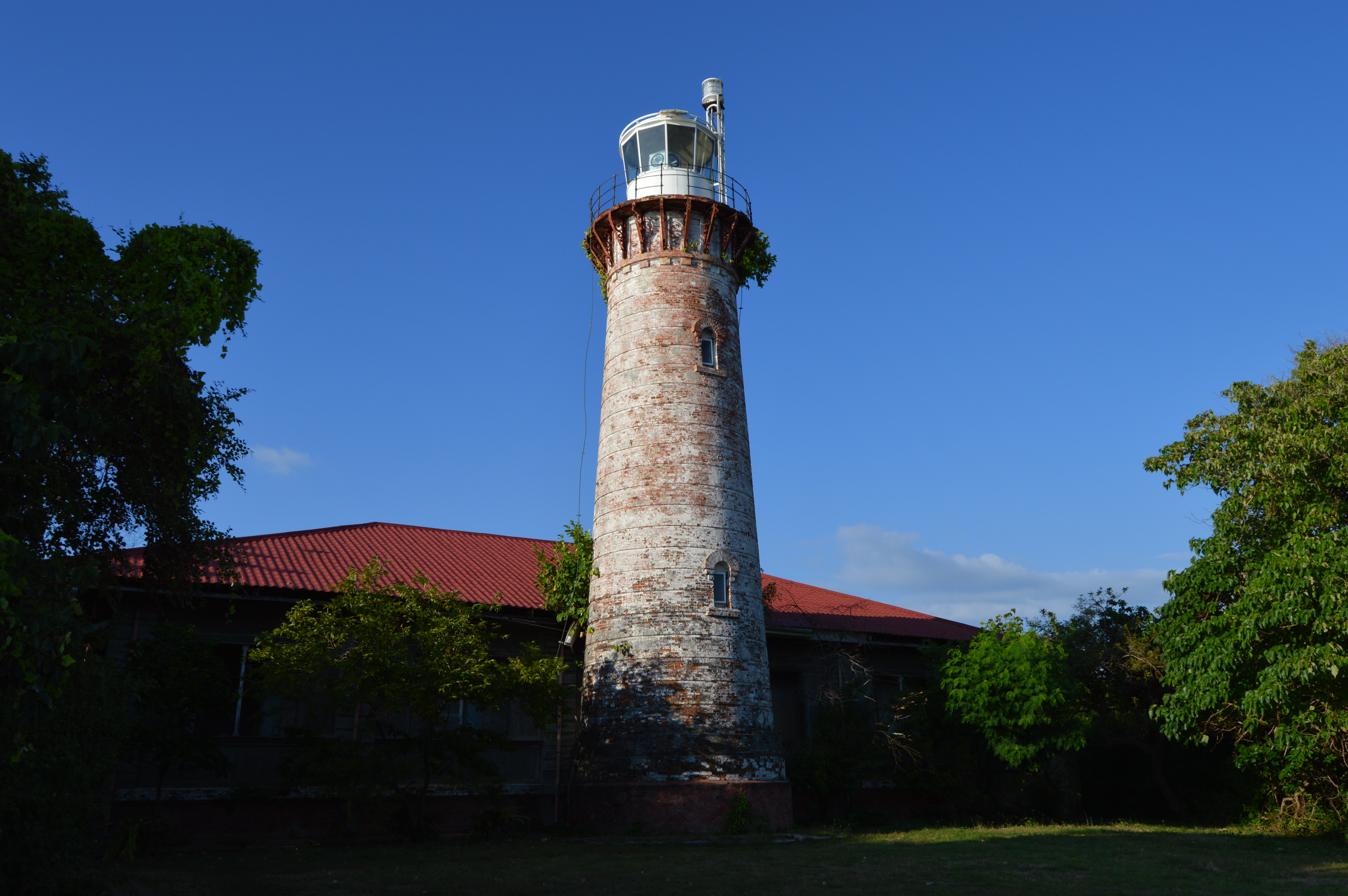
- The lighthouse in November 2018
- Location: Barangay Bagong Silang, Calatagan, Batangas, Philippines
- Coordinates: 13°46′17″N 120°39′09″E

Tower
- Constructed: 1887
- Construction: Brick and lime cement
- Automated: 1978
- Height: 15.5 metres (51 ft)
- Shape: Round
- Markings: Red tower and lantern
- Power source: solar power
- Heritage: National Historical Landmark

Light
- First lit: 1890
- Focal height: 27.1 metres (89 ft)
- Lens: Fourth-order Fresnel lens
- Range: 28.71 kilometres (15.50 nmi)
- Characteristic: Fl (3) W 5s.

Cape Santiago Lighthouse, also known as Faro de Cabo Santiago (Filipino: Parola ng Cabo Santiago), is a historic lighthouse located about 130 kilometres (81 mi) southwest of Manila in Barangay Bagong Silang, Calatagan, Batangas, Philippines. It is the oldest working lighthouse in Batangas and one of the oldest working lighthouses in the Philippines. It serves as a guide for ships passing through the Verde Island Passage and entering Manila Bay.

== History ==
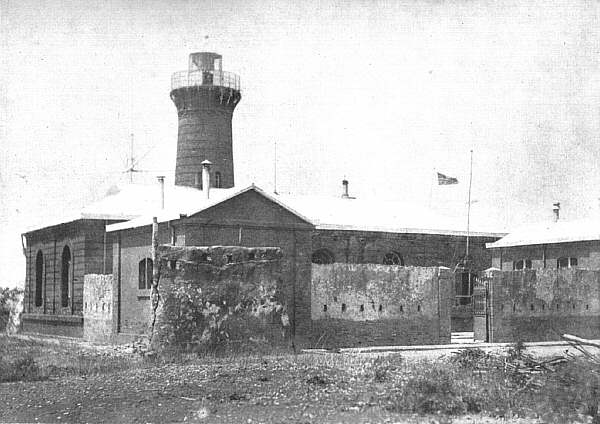
The lighthouse in 1903

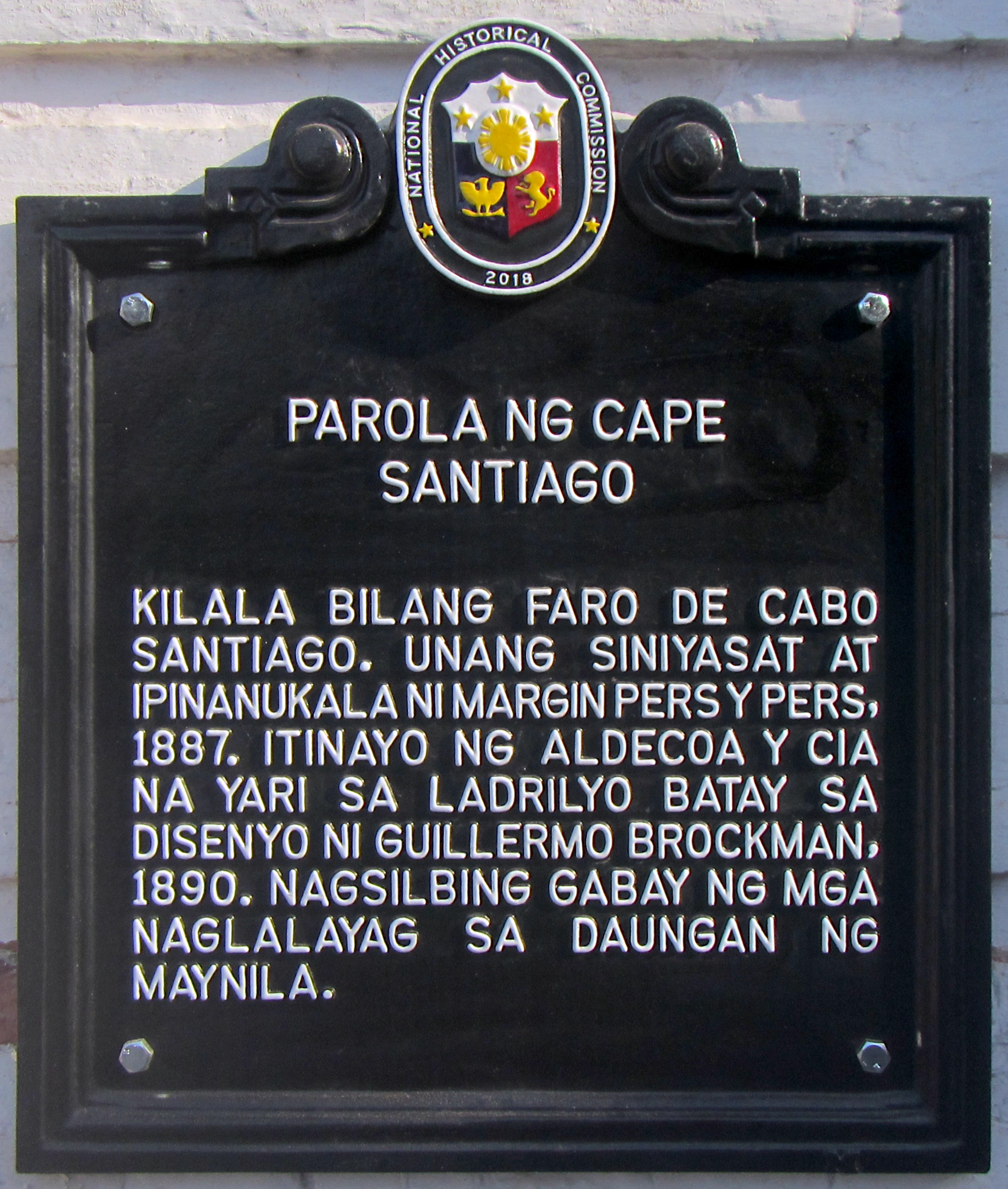
The NHCP historical marker installed on the site in 2018

The Cape Santiago Lighthouse was among the lighthouses constructed by the Spanish colonial authorities in the Philippines from 1846 to 1896 as part of the Plan General de Alumbrado de Maritimo de las Costas del Archipelago de Filipino (Masterplan for the Lighting of the Maritime Coasts of the Philippine Archipelago), the goal of which was to install 55 lighthouses all over the archipelago, including its remotest corners.

In 1887, Spanish engineer Magin Pers y Pers, who also designed the lighthouses at Cape Bojeador and Cape Engaño, proposed the construction of a lighthouse in Cape Santiago after conducting a site evaluation. Don Santiago Zobel, the rich landowner of Hacienda Bigaa in Calatagan, donated the one-hectare property where the lighthouse was constructed.

Construction company Aldecoa y Compania constructed the lighthouse based on a design by Spanish engineer Guillermo Brockman. Made of brick and lime cement, the red round structure is 15.5 metres (51 ft) tall and was modeled after Europe's medieval castles. A lighthouse keeper's house was also built beside the lighthouse tower where the keeper and his or her family can take up residence. The lighthouse was inaugurated and lit on December 15, 1890.

After the American annexation of the Philippines in 1898, the management of the Spanish-built lighthouses in the country fell into American hands. From 1900 to 1902 — the height of the Philippine–American War — the American gunboat USS Villalobos, a former Spanish gunboat captured after the American annexation of the Philippines, guarded the lighthouse. The gunboat regularly patrolled the area around the lighthouse, Malabrigo Point and Cabra Island from its base in Cavite, maintaining a communication link with the Marines guarding lighthouses and keeping a sharp lookout for smuggling and trafficking of supplies to Filipino revolutionaries.

During World War II, the lighthouse suffered minor damage after American warplanes strafed a Japanese garrison in the area. Over the succeeding years, the lighthouse deteriorated due to neglect and its original light source went missing. In 1980, the Japanese government, through the Japan International Cooperation Agency, donated a light bulb to replace the missing light source. The bulb has since been replaced with a modern, solar-powered lens that the Philippine Coast Guard (PCG) has recently installed.

In 1990, the PCG renovated the abandoned lighthouse keeper's house and repurposed it as an inn for tourists. It renovated structure was unveiled on December 15, 1990 — the centenary of the lighthouse's inauguration. On April 18, 1995, the PCG, then under Commodore Arturo Capada, signed a memorandum of understanding (MOU) with former Batangas Governor and Resort Association of the Philippines Inc. (RAPI) president Jose Antonio Leviste to develop Cape Santiago into a tourism site. RAPI reclaimed around 9,000 square metres (97,000 sq ft) of sea along the shoreline of the lighthouse, an action that was not part of the MOU, which only authorized the improvement of the existing building and development of the surrounding land area. The development has since been discontinued.

In October 2007, the Philippine Coast Guard Auxiliary proposed to adopt and restore the lighthouse as its headquarters.

On March 12, 2018, the National Historical Commission of the Philippines installed a historical marker on the site, designating its status a National Historical Landmark.

== See also ==
- List of lighthouses in the Philippines
- Calatagan, Batangas
- Cape Santiago
