= Yan Pei-Ming =

Chinese painter

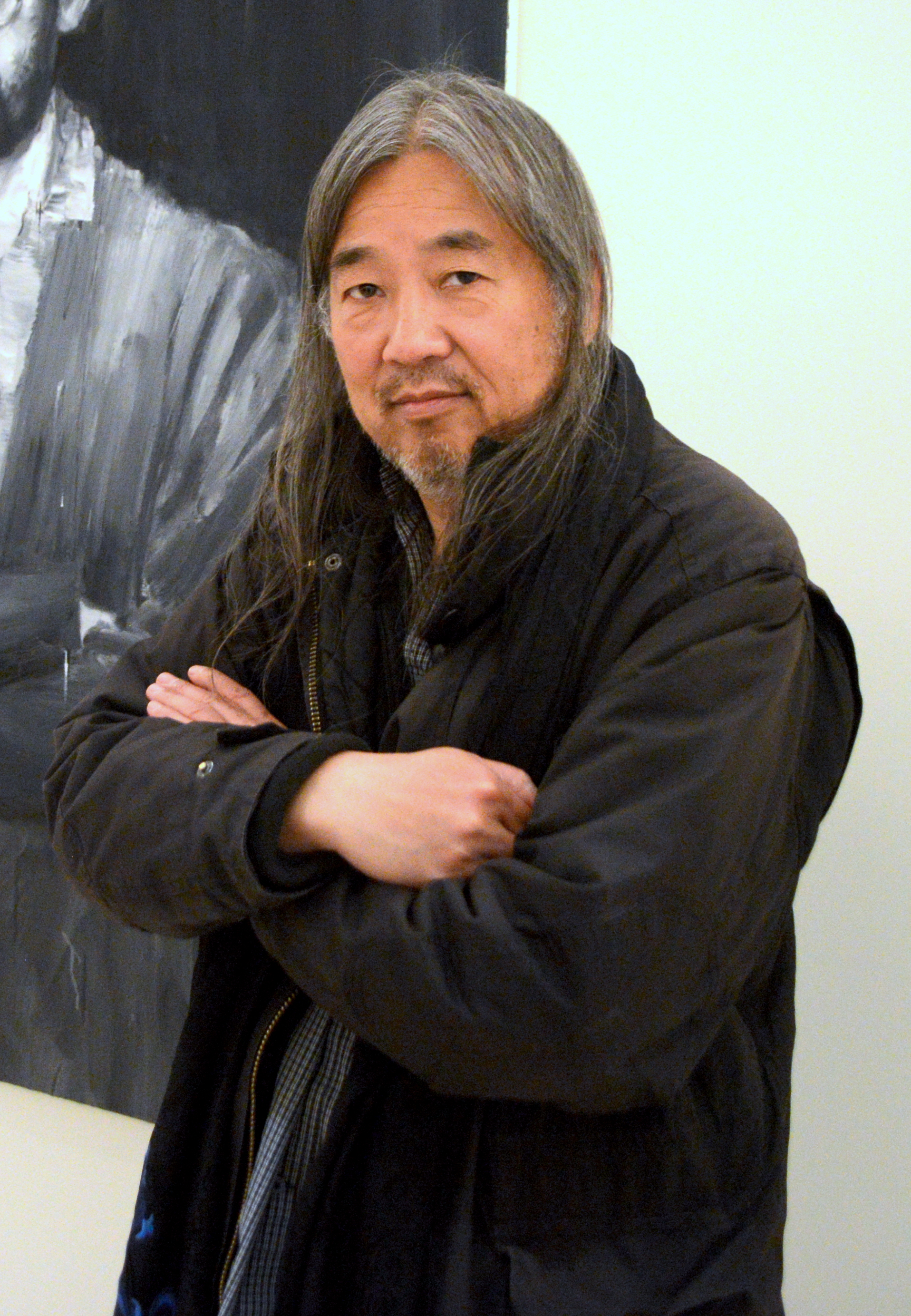
2019 Photo of Yan Pei-Ming

Yan Pei-Ming (Chinese: 严培明; pinyin: Yán Péimíng), born 1 December 1960, is a Chinese painter. Since 1981 he has been living in Dijon, France. His most famous paintings are "epic-sized" portraits of Mao Zedong worked out in black and white or red and white. He works with big brushes, and his paintings are brought to life by the rapid brush strokes which structure the picture space.

== Biography ==
=== Early life and education ===
Yan Pei-Ming was born on 1 December 1960 in Shanghai, the second of four children, working with art in a poor family of factory workers. His father worked in a slaughterhouse, and the family lived in a buddhist temple for a time. Ming grew up during the Cultural Revolution (1966–76) and learned painting in propaganda classes at school. At 14 in 1974, he created a "propaganda studio" in his spare time. Ming applied for admission to the Shanghai Art & Design School, but failed the oral test due to his stuttering problem. In 1979, aged 19, he decided to leave Shanghai and eventually emigrated to France in November 1980. Ming then enrolled in the École des Beaux-Arts of Dijon in September 1981, where he met French conceptual artist Sylvia Bossu.

=== Career ===
In 1987, Yan Pei-Ming renewed with the portraits of Chinese Communist leader Mao Zedong. In 1991, his first solo exhibition was held at the Centre Pompidou in Paris and earned him international recognition. In 1999, he set up portraits of children from Soweto at the Panthéon, and monumental grey paintings of French CRS at the Venice Biennale in 2003.

Yan Pei-Ming is also known for his "epic-sized" portraits of Bruce Lee, Pope Jean-Paul II, Barack Obama, Mona Lisa, or his father. In 2006, his monumental portrait of Dominique de Villepin, then the French First Minister, was exhibited at the Grand Palais, and has been interpreted as a "half-reverent, half-ironic tribute to the ego of politicians."

His first solo exhibition in the United States was displayed at the David Zwirner Gallery in New York City, in May 2007. In 2009 Yan Pei-Ming's "The Funeral of Mona Lisa" exhibition was held at the Louvre, featuring a self-portrait and a painting of his father, both in death.

In 2009, Yan Pei-Ming had solo exhibitions at the Ullens Center for Contemporary Art, Beijing, and the San Francisco Art Institute. Group exhibitions include the Sevilla Biennale in 2006; the Istanbul Biennial in 2007, among others. In 2013 a red self-portrait has been installed at the University of St. Gallen in Switzerland.

In 2016 he had an exhibition at the Villa Medici in Rome. In March 2019 French President Emmanuel Macron visited Ming at his Ivry-sur-Seine studio, and inaugurated in June of the same year an exhibition at the Musée Courbet featuring Ming's works. In 2019 Ming exhibited at the Musée d'Orsay and headed the project "Yan Pei-Ming/Courbet, corps-à-corps" (English: "Coubert: Face-to-Face"), displaying his works along with those of Gustave Courbet at the Petit Palais.

== Collections ==
Public collections holding works by Yan Pei-Ming include the Centre Georges Pompidou; the Musée des beaux-arts de Dijon; the Honolulu Museum of Art; the National Gallery of Australia; the National Museum of Modern Art, Tokyo; the Museum Ludwig; and the Shanghai Art Museum.
