= Cape Santiago =

Southwestern point of Luzon, Philippines

- Cape
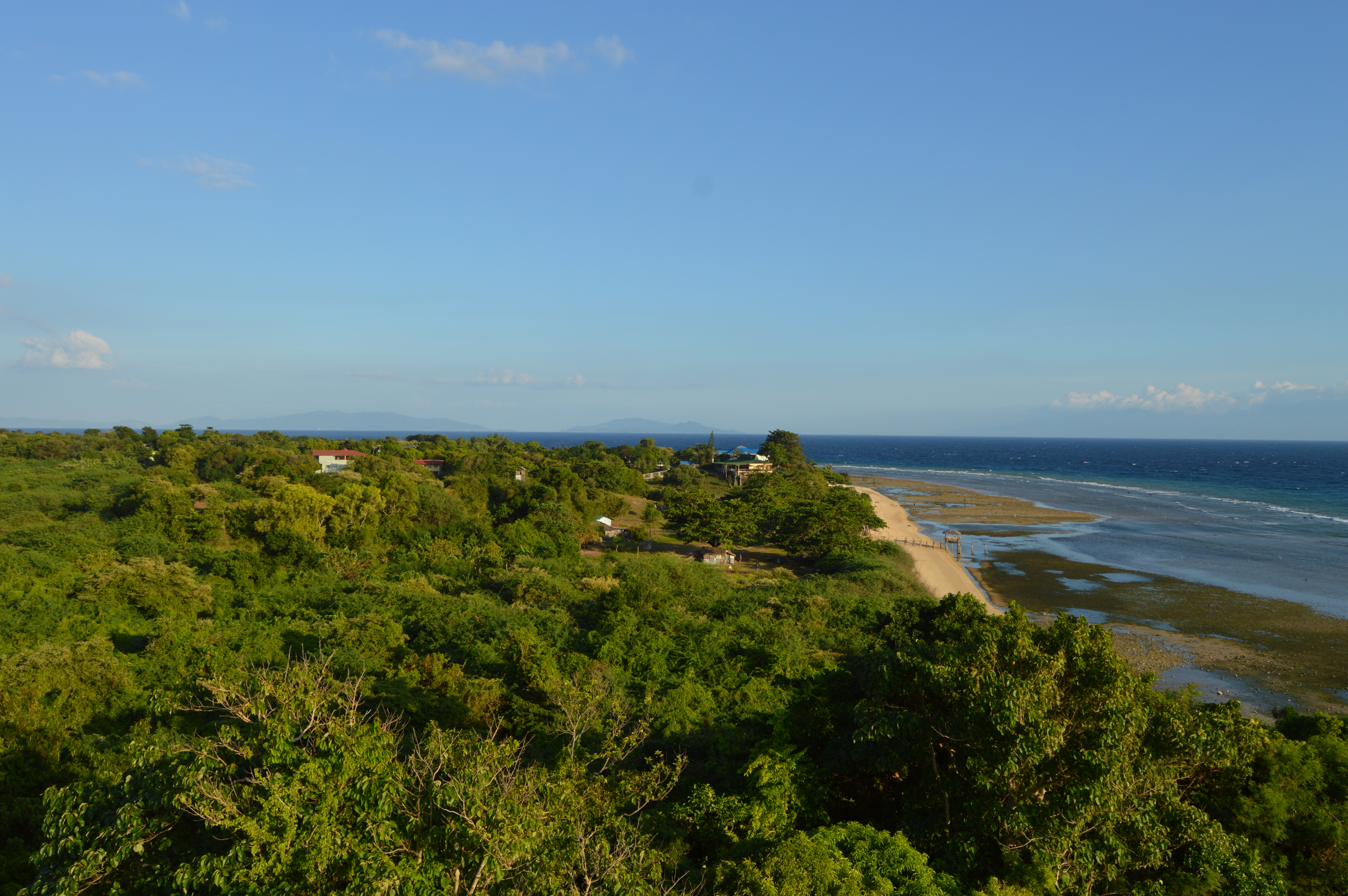
- View of the cape from the lighthouse

- Coordinates: 13°46′17″N 120°39′09″E
- Location: Calatagan, Batangas, Philippines

Cape Santiago (Spanish: Cabo Santiago, Filipino: Kabo Santiago) is the southwestern point of the island of Luzon located within the municipality of Calatagan in Batangas, Philippines. It is a cape at the southern tip of Calatagan Peninsula which faces the West Philippine Sea to the west and Pagapas Bay, an arm of Balayan Bay, to the east. The cape has been the site of a navigational aid since the 1890s.

Cape Santiago is located about 130 kilometres (81 mi) southwest of Manila. It is administratively part of the barangay of Bagong Silang.

== Geography ==
Cape Santiago is located about 6.8 kilometres (4.2 mi) southeast of the Port of Calatagan where ferries bound for Lubang Island operate. It is 91 to 116 metres (299 to 381 ft) high, wooded, and fringed by a drying reef extending 0.16 kilometres (0.099 mi) offshore. There are depths of 7 to 9 metres (23 to 30 ft) at the edge of the reef, increasing steeply to more than 91 metres (299 ft) deep about 0.8 kilometres (0.50 mi) offshore.

A dangerous coral rock lies 6.4 kilometres (4.0 mi) southeast of the cape in the Verde Island Passage known as Minerva Rock, named after an Australian ship that struck on it in 1834.

A lighthouse marks a low rocky promontory about 0.5 miles (0.80 km) west-northwest of the south extremity of the cape. A conspicuous windmill stands about 0.4 mile east-southeast of the lighthouse.

== Cape Santiago Lighthouse ==
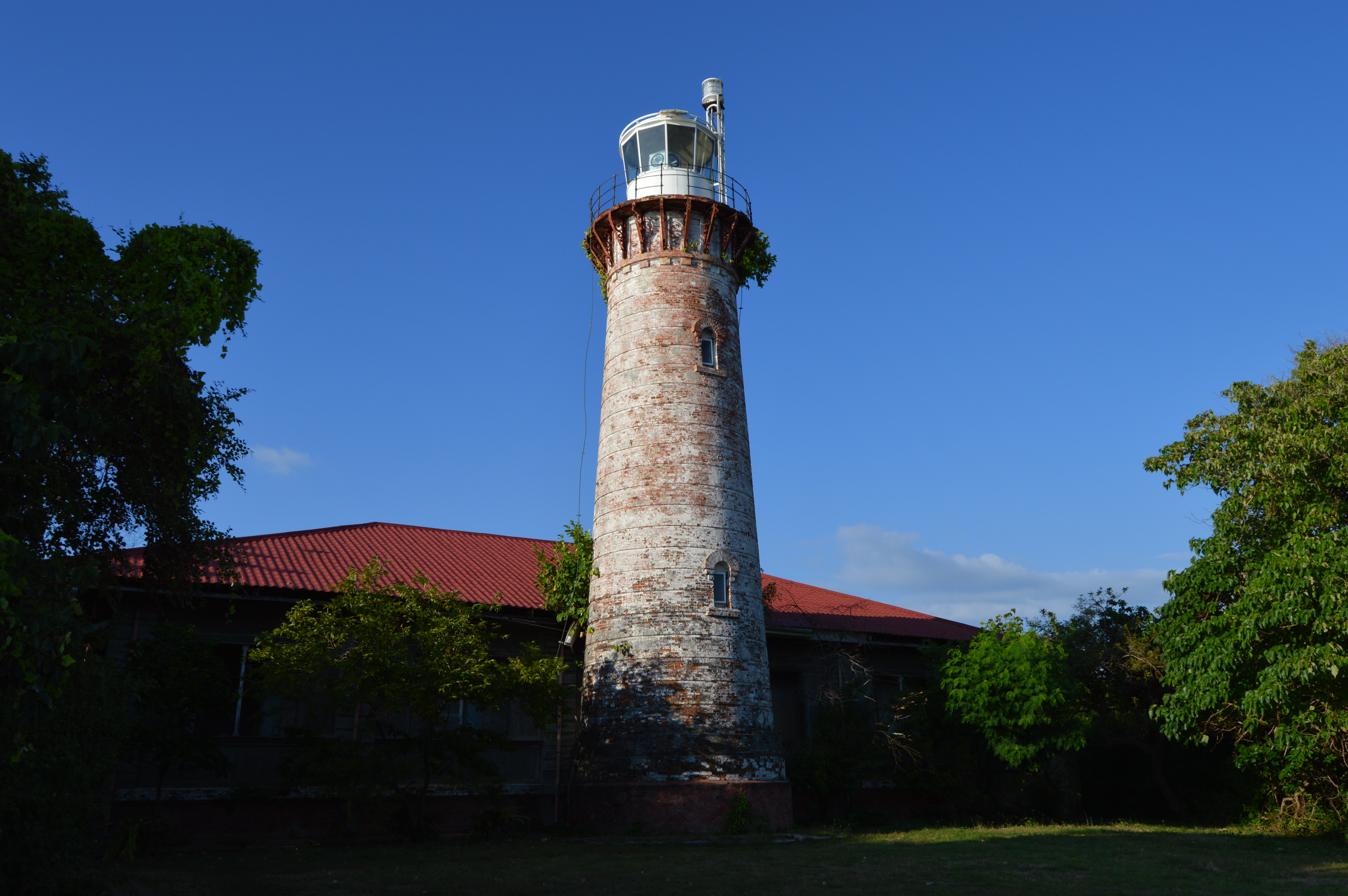
Cape Santiago Lighthouse as viewed in November 2018.

The lighthouse at Cape Santiago is the oldest structure in Calatagan built in the 1890s during the Spanish colonial period. Made of brick and lime cement, this red round structure is 51 feet (16 m) tall modeled after the medieval castles in Europe. It is currently in a deteriorated condition with its original light source missing, replaced by an automatic light bulb donated by the Japan International Cooperation Agency that is no longer being used due to lack of funding.
