= Calatagan =

Municipality in Batangas, Philippines

Calatagan Bayan ng Calatagan Kalatagan
- Municipality
- Municipality of Calatagan
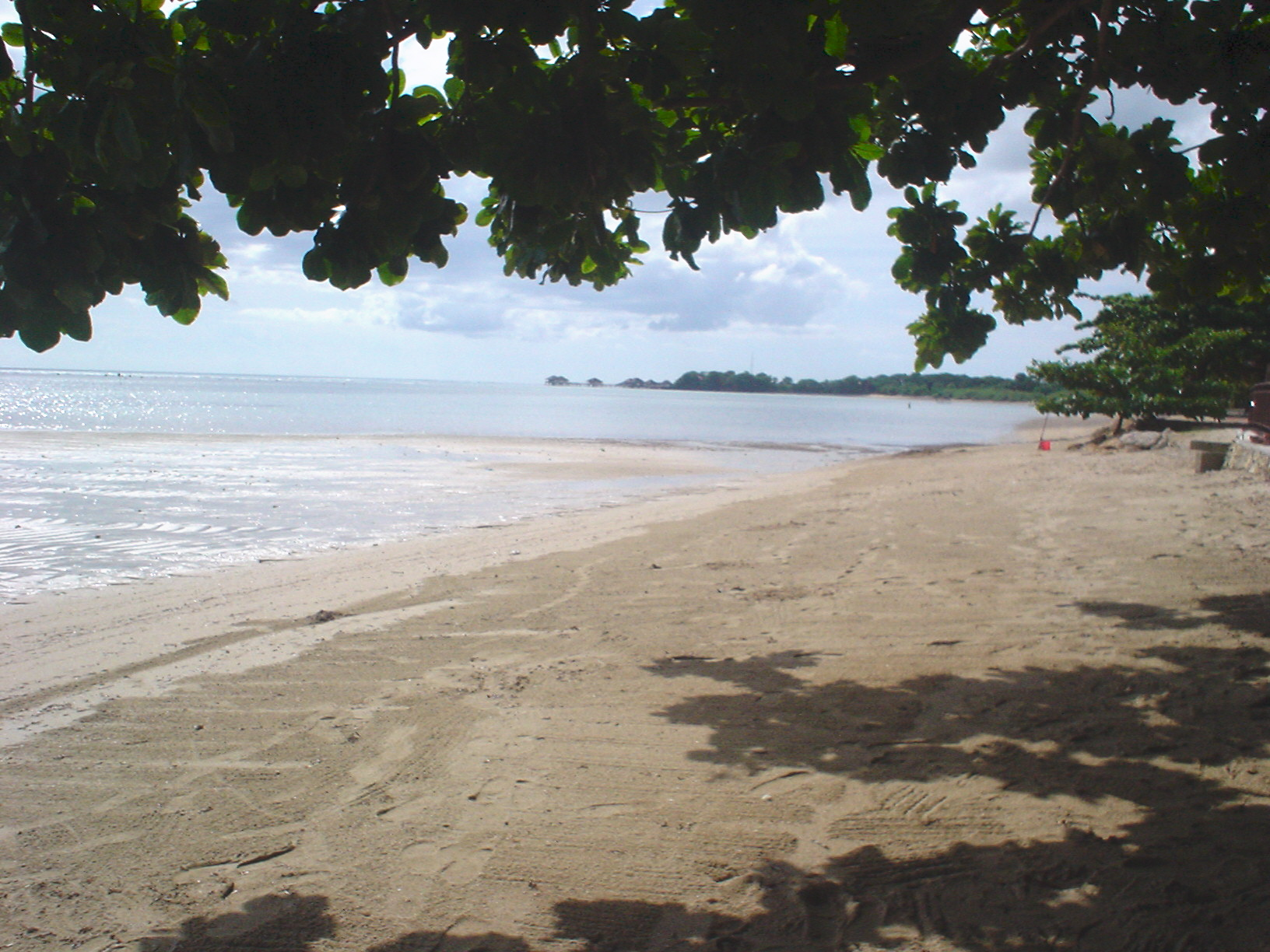
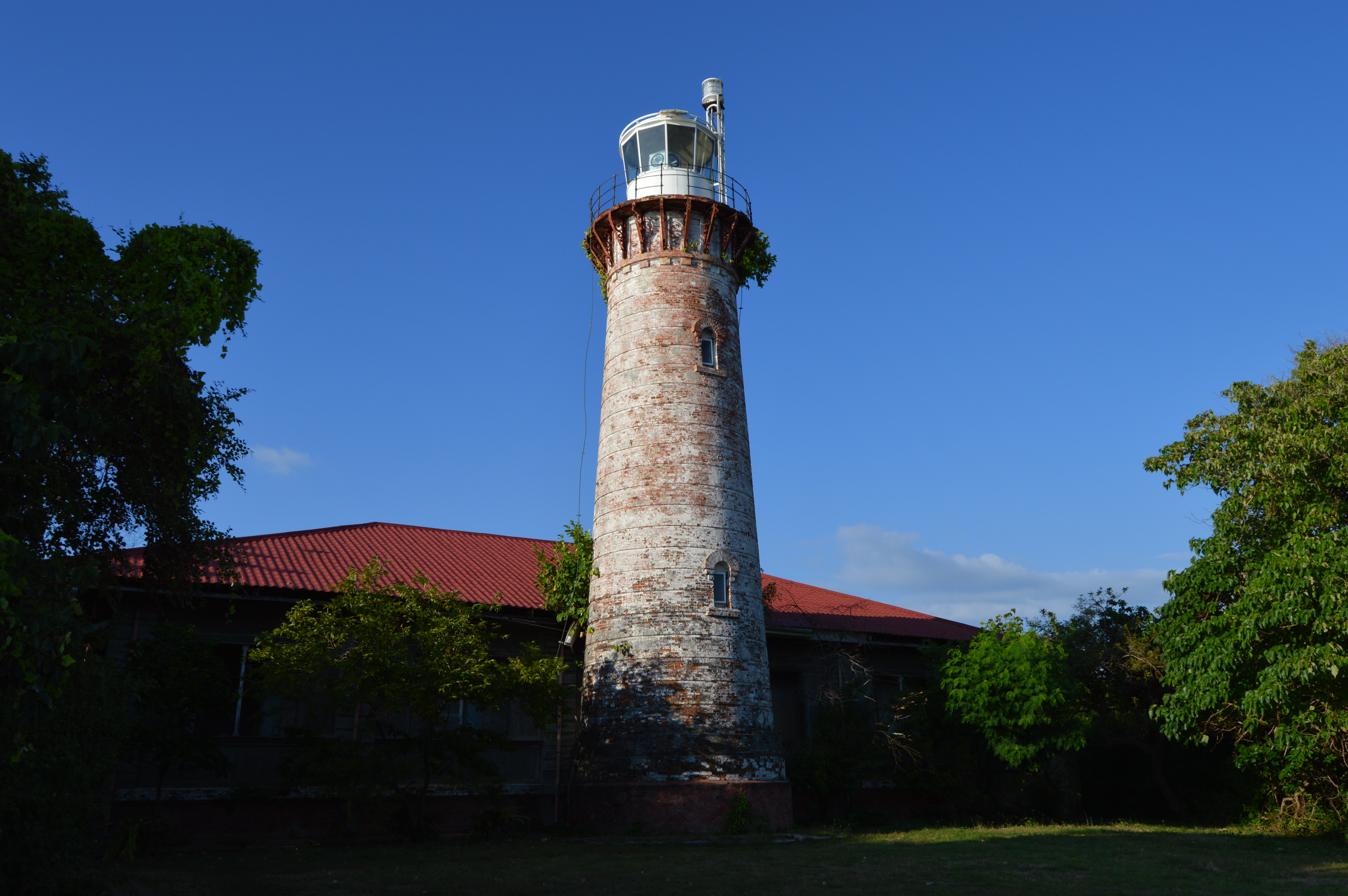
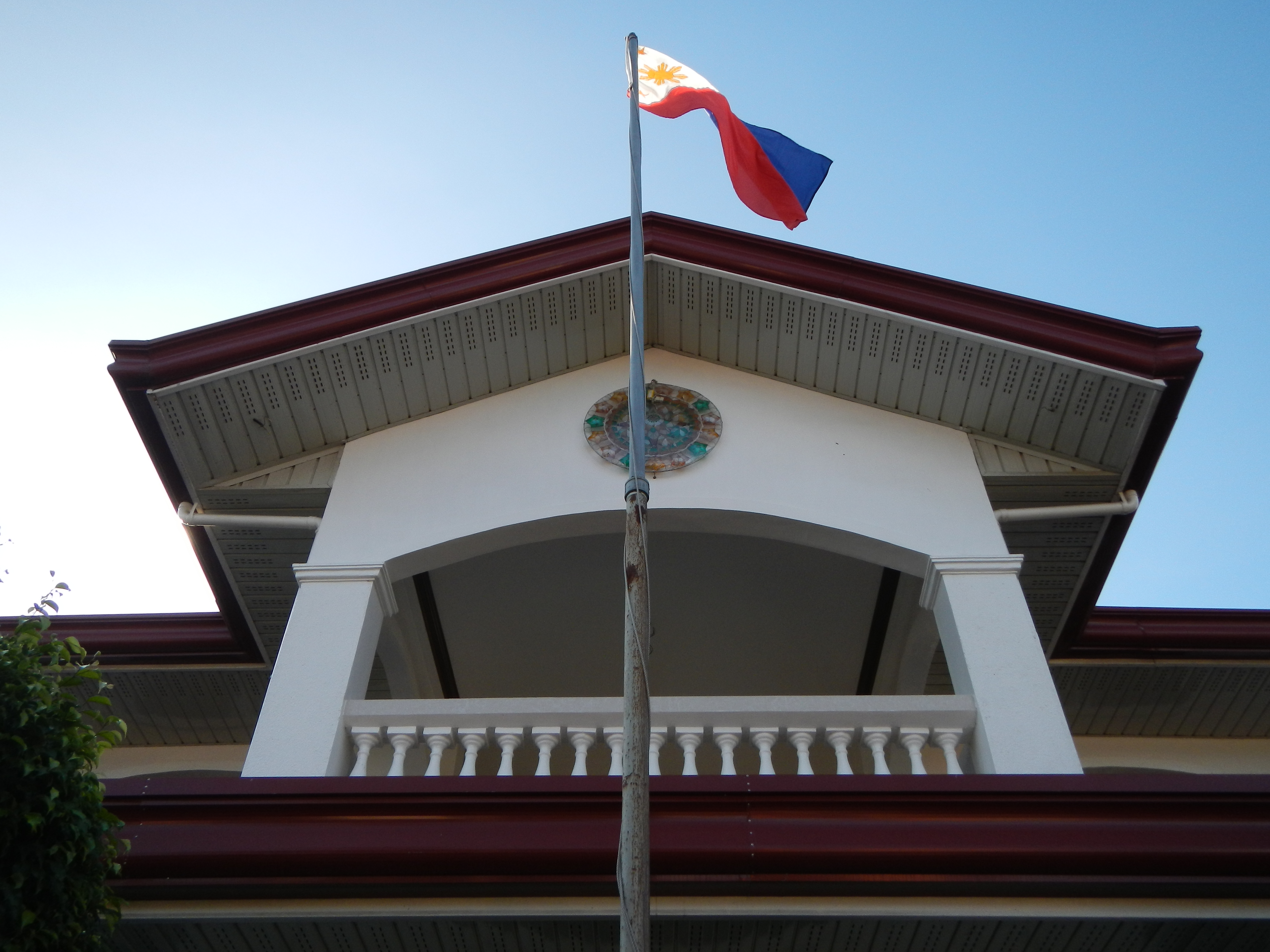
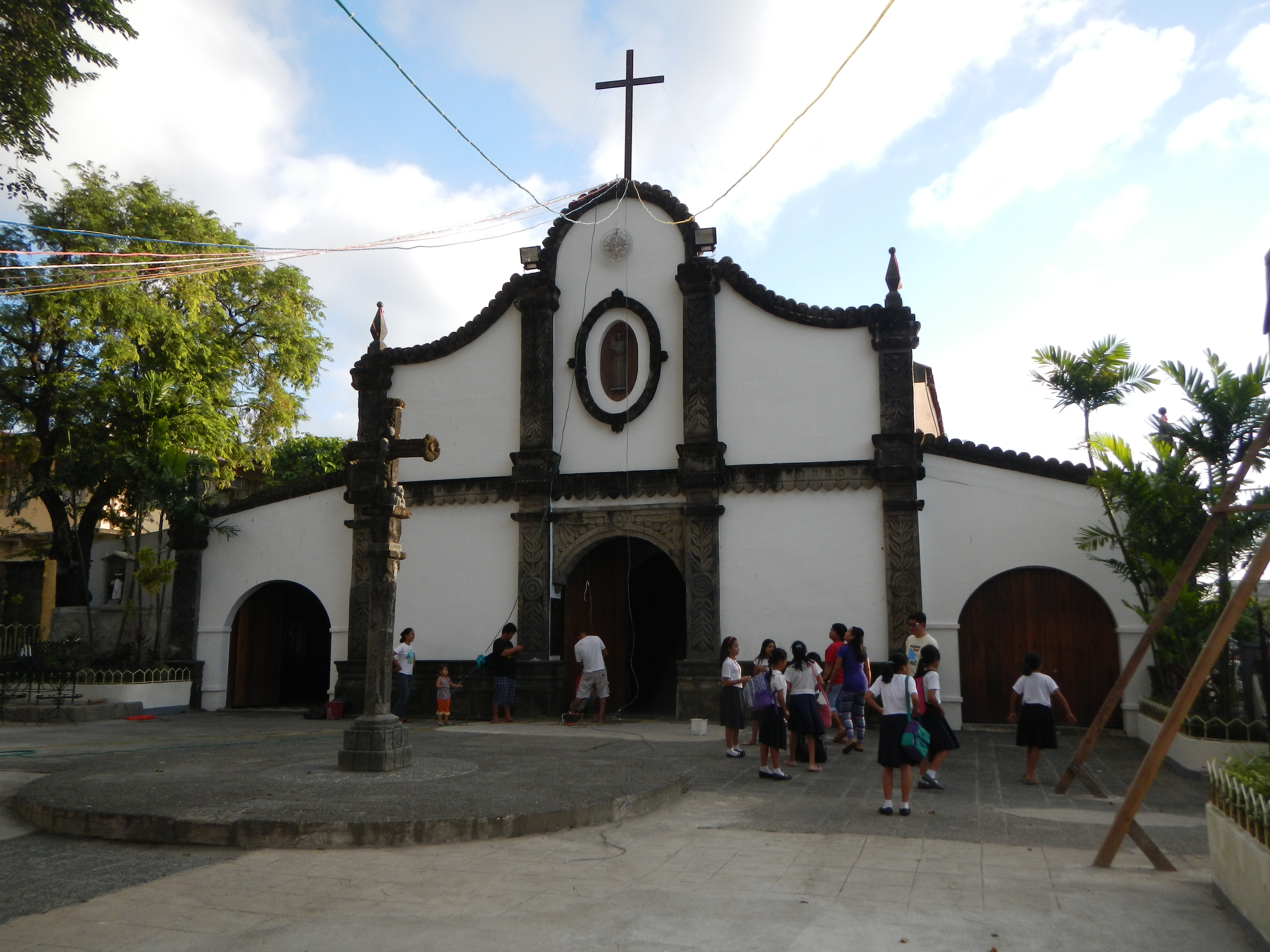
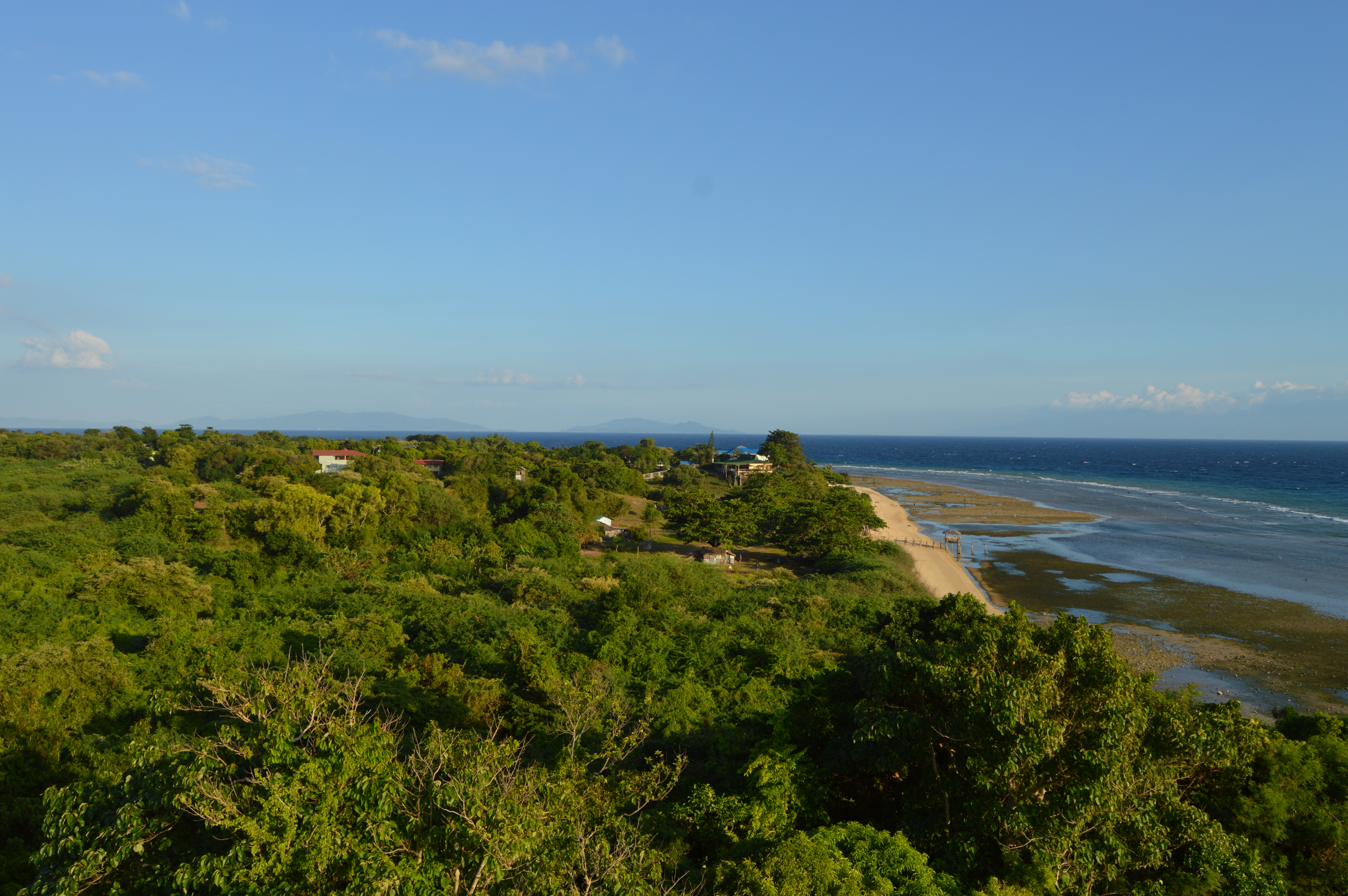
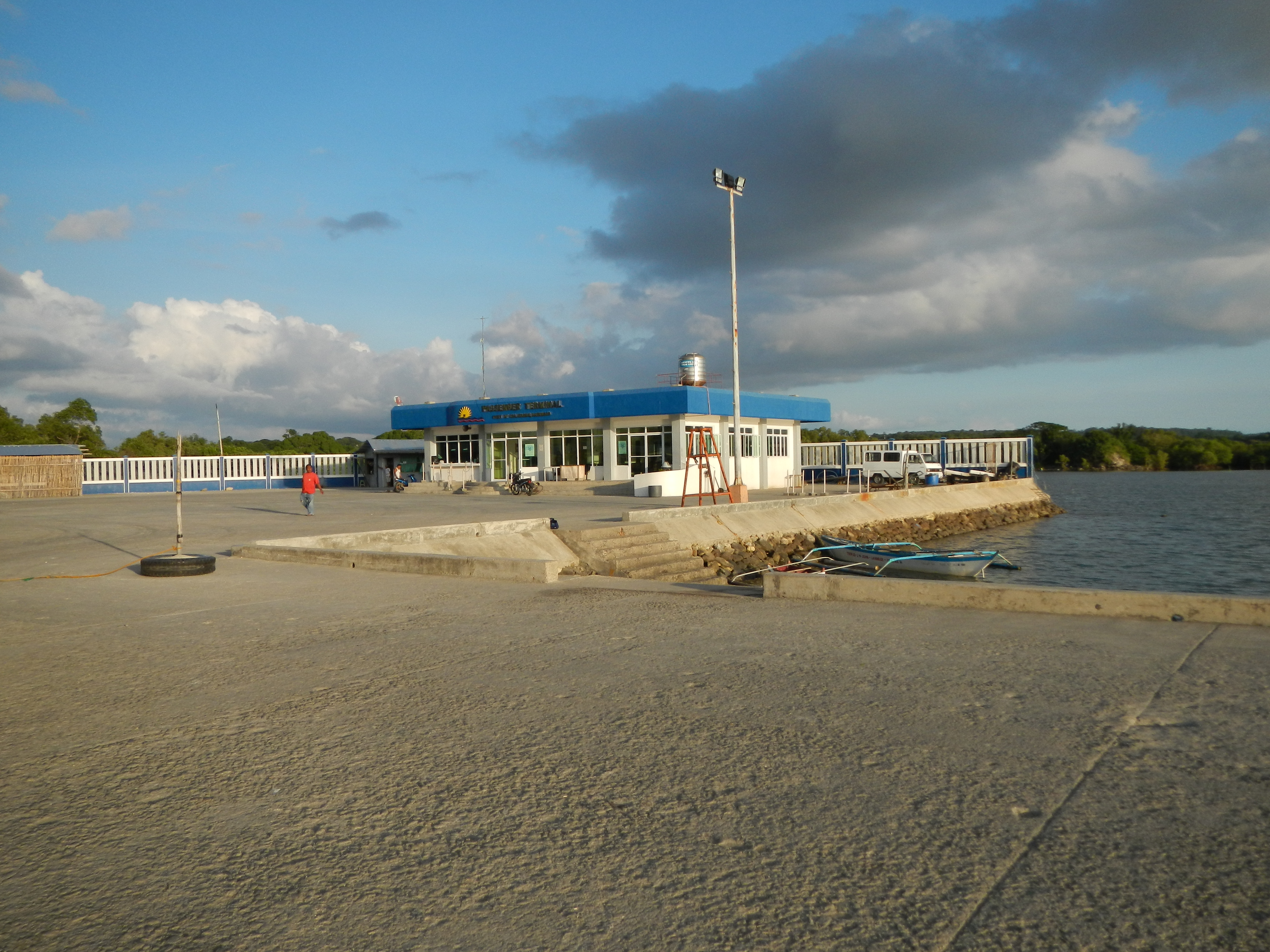
- Clockwise from top: Beach, Cape Santiago Lighthouse, Sto. Domingo de Silos Parish, Port of Calatagan, View of Southern Calatagan, Calatagan Municipal Hall

- Seal

- Map of Batangas with Calatagan highlighted
- Interactive map of Calatagan
- Location within the Philippines
- Coordinates: 13°49′59″N 120°37′55″E
- Country: Philippines
- Region: Calabarzon
- Province: Batangas
- District: 1st district
- Founded: January 1, 1912
- Barangays: 25 (see Barangays)

Government
  - Type: Sangguniang Bayan
  - Mayor: Rico B. Puno
  - Vice Mayor: Rogelio H. Zarraga
  - Representative: Leandro Antonio L. Leviste
  - Municipal Council: Members: Rexio B. Bautista; Ramon G. Ancheta; Noel A. Delas Alas; Ramon G. Ancheta; Danilo L. Pineda; Virgilio A. Eleponga Jr.; Jeffrey P. Dela Cruz; Harold A. Anzaldo
  - Electorate: 38,198 voters (2025)

Area
  - Total: 112.00 km^{2} (43.24 sq mi)
- Elevation: 6.0 m (19.7 ft)
- Highest elevation: 347 m (1,138 ft)
- Lowest elevation: 0 m (0 ft)

Population (2024 census)
  - Total: 60,420
  - Density: 539.5/km^{2} (1,397/sq mi)
  - Households: 14,267

Economy
  - Income class: 1st municipal income class
  - Poverty incidence: 11.38% (2023)
  - Revenue: ₱ 323.9 million (2024)
  - Assets: ₱ 852.3 million (2024)
  - Expenditure: ₱ 137.1 million (2024)
  - Liabilities: ₱ 69.57 million (2024)

Service provider
  - Electricity: Batangas 1 Electric Cooperative (BATELEC 1)
- Time zone: UTC+8 (PST)
- ZIP code: 4215
- PSGC: 0401008000
- IDD : area code: +63 (0)43
- Native languages: Tagalog
- Website: www.calatagan.gov.ph

Calatagan, officially the Municipality of Calatagan (Tagalog: Bayan ng Calatagan), is a municipality in the province of Batangas, Philippines. According to the 2024 census, it has a population of 60,420 people.

A rare example of pre-Hispanic Philippine script was discovered in Calatagan. It is known as Baybayin in Tagalog, the scrip traces its origins to Javanese writing, itself derived from Brahmi. This inscription was preserved on an earthenware burial jar, dated to the 13th or 14th century.

== Etymology ==
The word Calatagan is taken from the Tagalog word latag and is closely associated with kapatagan, which means a vast portion of flat land lying between the hills and mountains. Thus, Calatagan means a large expanse of wide flat land.

== History ==
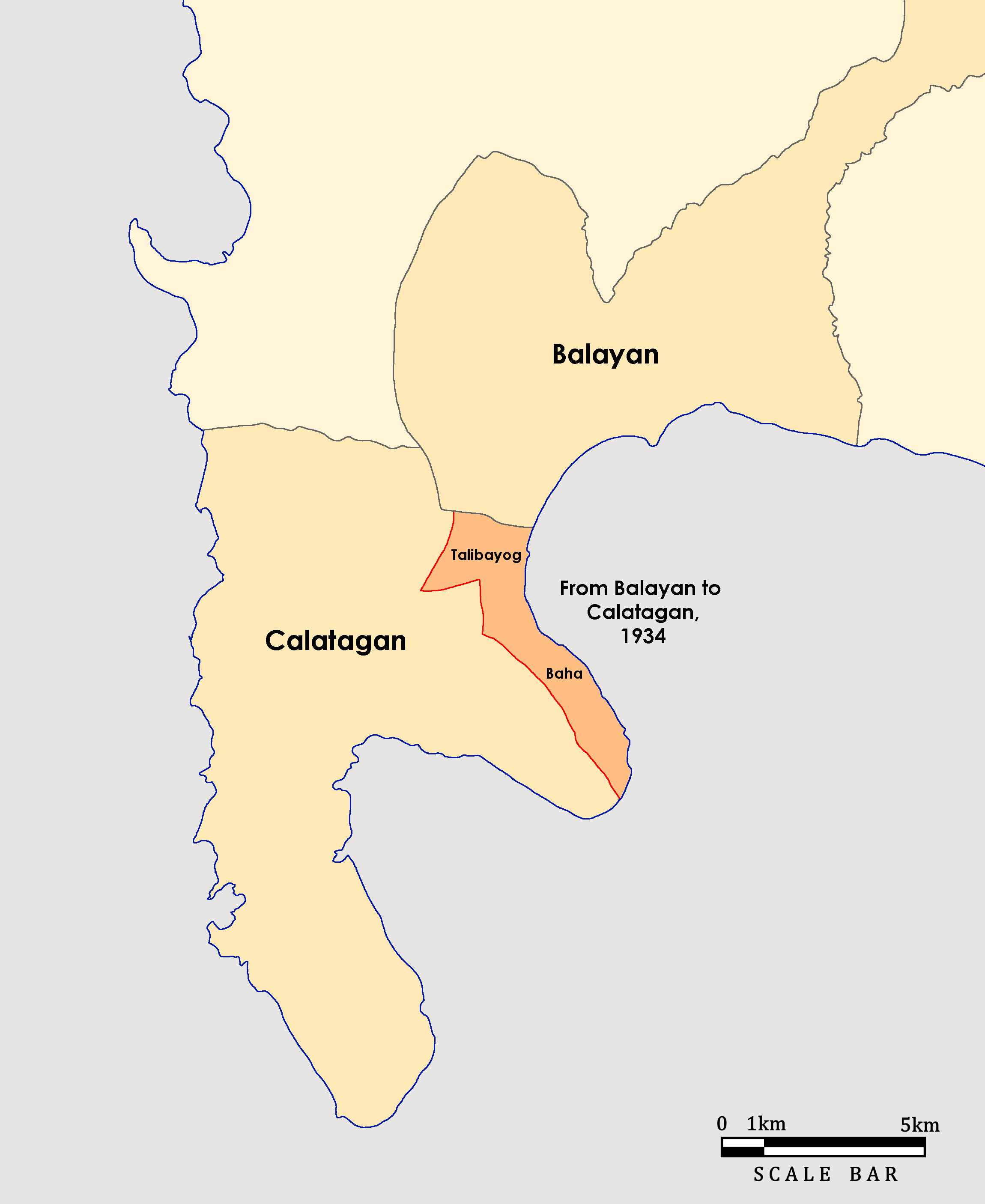
A map showing the 1934 transfer of the barangays of Talibayog and Baha from Balayan to Calatagan.

The town is the site of the historically and archaeologically famous Calatagan Excavation whose antique pottery and utensils contributed important facts about the culture and activities of the Filipinos before the coming of the Spaniards. Chinese pottery, unearthed from six large cemeteries by archaeologists Olov T.R Jones and Robert B. Fox led to a conclusion made by H. Otley Beyer which points out the existence of a sizable pre-Spanish population in the town. The same studies suggested that there were direct Chinese trade by water in Calatagan and centered at a place called Balong-Bato, wherein an entrance through the reef, which surrounds Calatagan, is still presently used by vessels coming from Mindoro and Manila.

The land occupied by the municipality of Calatagan was acquired by Domingo Roxas from the Spanish Crown in 1829 and was called Hacienda de Calatagan. The successors Pedro P. Roxas and Antonio R. Roxas continued to develop it.

In 1912, through Executive Order No. 78 by then Governor-General William Cameron Forbes, Calatagan became a municipality independent from its mother municipality, Balayan.

In 1931, Carmen Roxas, the last heir of the Roxas Clan transferred ownership of the Hacienda to the Zobel brothers, Jacobo and Alfonso. During the time of the Zobels, the hacienda came to be known as Central Azucarera de Calatagan or simply "Central Carmen" when referring to the sugar milling complex.

In 1934, the barangays of Baha and Talibayog, which were parts of Balayan at the time, were annexed to Calatagan since surveys showed that they are part of the land titled to the original owner of Hacienda Calatagan. This added a big area to the municipality.

On October 28, 1957, a decade after the Philippines gained independence from the Americans, the Land Tenure Administration, upon petition of the people of Calatagan bought the Hacienda Lands from the Zobels. These were apportioned to the inhabitants and sold to them at ₱5.00 (equivalent to ₱639.8 in 2021) per hectare payable in installment within a period of 25 years.

== Geography ==
Calatagan comprises the Calatagan Peninsula between the South China Sea and Balayan Bay. It is located at 13°49′59″N 120°37′55″E.

According to the Philippine Statistics Authority, the municipality has a land area of 112.00 square kilometers (43.24 sq mi) constituting 3.59% of the 3,119.75-square-kilometer (1,204.54 sq mi) total area of Batangas.

Calatagan is 71 kilometers (44 mi) from Batangas City and 129 kilometers (80 mi) from Manila.

=== Barangays ===
Calatagan is politically subdivided into 25 barangays, as indicated in the matrix below. Each barangay consists of puroks and some have sitios.

PSGC	Barangay	Population			±% p.a.	
		2024		2010		
041008001	Bagong Silang	3.8%	2,270	2,074	▴	0.63%
041008002	Baha	0.0%	0	1,494	▾	−100.00%
041008003	Balibago	5.6%	3,377	3,161	▴	0.46%
041008004	Balitoc	5.0%	3,023	2,814	▴	0.50%
041008005	Biga	4.7%	2,849	2,795	▴	0.13%
041008006	Bucal	1.6%	965	892	▴	0.55%
041008007	Carlosa	2.3%	1,414	1,253	▴	0.84%
041008008	Carretunan	2.5%	1,504	1,449	▴	0.26%
041008009	Encarnacion	2.2%	1,327	1,049	▴	1.65%
041008010	Gulod	5.2%	3,127	2,798	▴	0.78%
041008011	Hukay	3.5%	2,120	2,124	▾	−0.01%
041008013	Lucsuhin	7.5%	4,528	4,299	▴	0.36%
041008014	Luya	1.1%	664	616	▴	0.52%
041008015	Paraiso	2.2%	1,346	1,133	▴	1.21%
041008016	Barangay 1 (Poblacion)	5.7%	3,433	3,150	▴	0.60%
041008017	Barangay 2 (Poblacion)	2.3%	1,408	1,296	▴	0.58%
041008018	Barangay 3 (Poblacion)	1.6%	953	760	▴	1.59%
041008019	Barangay 4 (Poblacion)	4.7%	2,863	2,770	▴	0.23%
041008020	Quilitisan	3.6%	2,176	2,022	▴	0.51%
041008021	Real	2.6%	1,588	1,380	▴	0.98%
041008022	Sambungan	3.3%	1,975	1,820	▴	0.57%
041008023	Santa Ana	5.3%	3,209	2,747	▴	1.09%
041008026	Talibayog	0.3%	200	1,783	▾	−14.11%
041008027	Talisay	4.3%	2,617	2,524	▴	0.25%
041008028	Tanagan	7.0%	4,224	3,794	▴	0.75%
	Total		60,420	51,997	▴	1.05%

=== Climate ===
Climate data for Calatagan, Batangas
Month	Jan	Feb	Mar	Apr	May	Jun	Jul	Aug	Sep	Oct	Nov	Dec	Year
Mean daily maximum °C (°F)	29 (84)	30 (86)	31 (88)	33 (91)	32 (90)	30 (86)	29 (84)	29 (84)	29 (84)	29 (84)	29 (84)	29 (84)	30 (86)
Mean daily minimum °C (°F)	20 (68)	20 (68)	21 (70)	22 (72)	24 (75)	24 (75)	24 (75)	24 (75)	24 (75)	23 (73)	22 (72)	21 (70)	22 (72)
Average precipitation mm (inches)	11 (0.4)	13 (0.5)	14 (0.6)	32 (1.3)	101 (4.0)	142 (5.6)	208 (8.2)	187 (7.4)	175 (6.9)	131 (5.2)	68 (2.7)	39 (1.5)	1,121 (44.3)
Average rainy days	5.2	5.0	7.4	11.5	19.8	23.5	27.0	25.9	25.2	23.2	15.5	8.3	197.5
Source: Meteoblue (Use with caution: this is modeled/calculated data, not measured locally.)

== Demographics ==
Population census of Calatagan
Year	Pop.	±% p.a.
1903	2,654	—
1918	4,636	+3.79%
1939	7,710	+2.45%
1948	9,620	+2.49%
1960	14,457	+3.45%
1970	20,889	+3.74%
1975	23,648	+2.52%
1980	27,578	+3.12%
1990	35,543	+2.57%
1995	40,707	+2.57%
2000	45,068	+2.21%
2007	51,544	+1.87%
2010	51,997	+0.32%
2015	56,449	+1.58%
2020	58,719	+0.83%
2024	60,420	+0.69%
Source: Philippine Statistics Authority

In the 2024 census, Calatagan had a population of 60,420 people. The population density was 540 inhabitants per square kilometer (1,400/sq mi).

== Economy ==
Poverty incidence of Calatagan (%)

Source: Philippine Statistics Authority

== Tourism ==
A Spanish lighthouse can also be found at Cape Santiago at the peninsula's southern tip dating back to the 1890s and is also one of the municipality's main tourist attractions.

The peninsula's near white sand beaches are well-known vacation and leisure sites. There are several beach resorts including the Banak House Calatagan on Calatagan beach, the Ronco Beach Resort in Barangay Bagong Silang, Playa Calatagan in barangay Santa Ana, Lago de Oro Resort in barangay Balibago, Villa Agustina in barangay Bagong Silang, and Nacua Sea Park in barangay Quilitisan. Calatagan was formerly titled as the Forbes Park of the South, because of the rich families who own estates here.

== Education ==
The Calatagan Schools District Office governs all educational institutions within the municipality. It oversees the management and operations of all private and public, from primary to secondary schools.

=== Primary and elementary schools ===
- Angelita Zobel Elementary School
- Balibago Elementary School
- Bucal Elementary School
- Calambuyan Elementary School
- Calatagan Christian Academy
- Carlosa Elementary Schoo
- Carretonan Elementary School
- Encarnacion Elementary School
- Enrique Zobel Elementary School
- Florencio D. Firmante Elementary School
- Gulod Elementary School
- Hukay Elementary School
- Jacobo Zobel Elementary School
- Jose M. Caisip Elementary School
- Kilitisan Elementary School
- Luya Elementary School
- Lycee de San Antonio Montessori
- Multiple Intelligence Nurturing Discovery School
- Nicolites Montessori School
- Our Lady of Carmel School
- Pacita Madrigal Warns Mababang Paaralan ng Bagong Silang
- Paraiso Elementary School
- Pedro Palacio Sr. Memorial Elementary School
- Santiago Zobel Elementary School
- Talisay Elementary School
- Tanagan Elementary School

=== Secondary schools ===
- Calatagan Institute
- Calatagan National High School
- Calatagan Senior High School
- Colegio De Santo Domingo De Silos
- E. Zobel Foundation
- Lucsuhin National High School

== Gallery ==
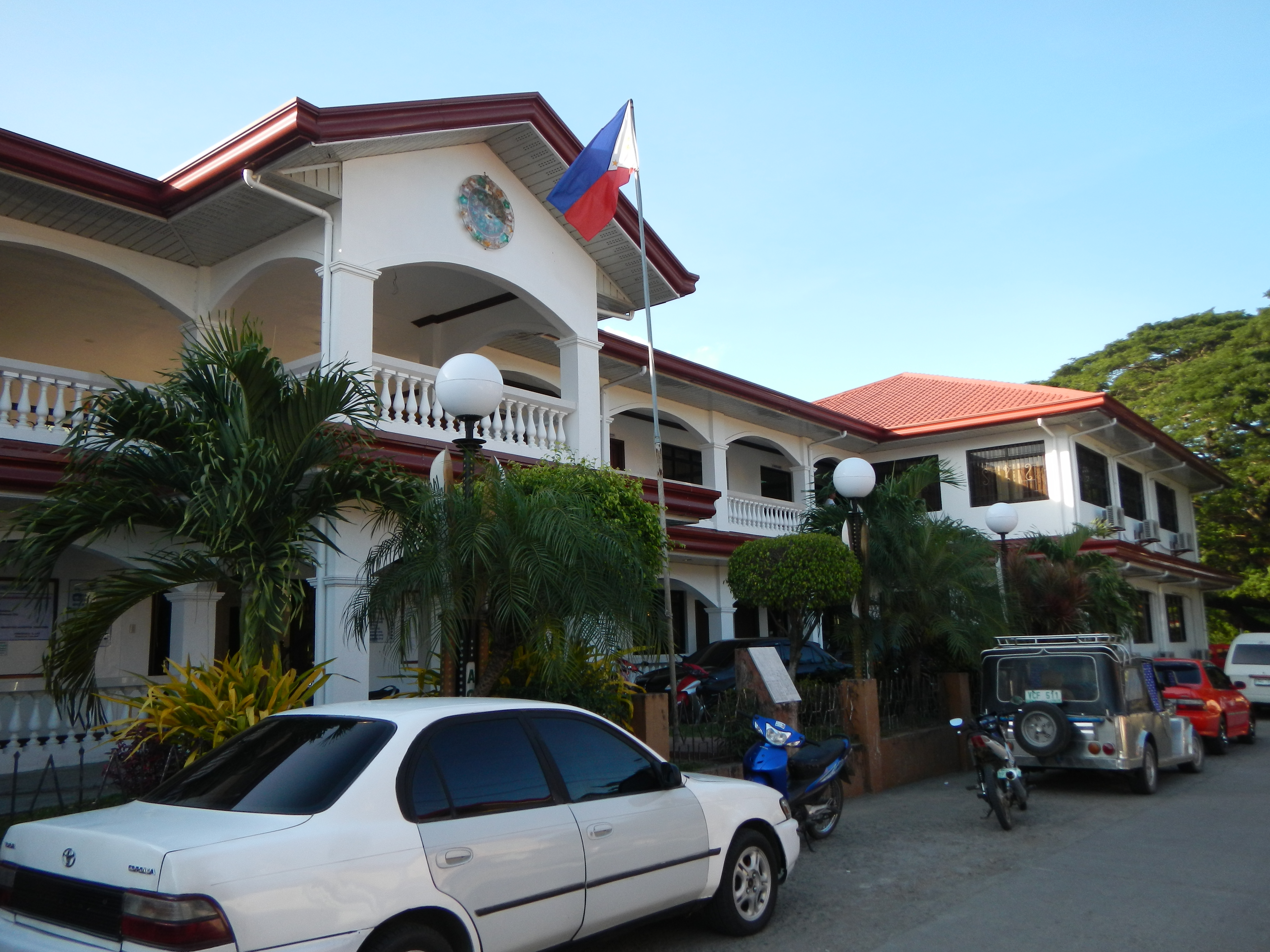
Municipal Hall

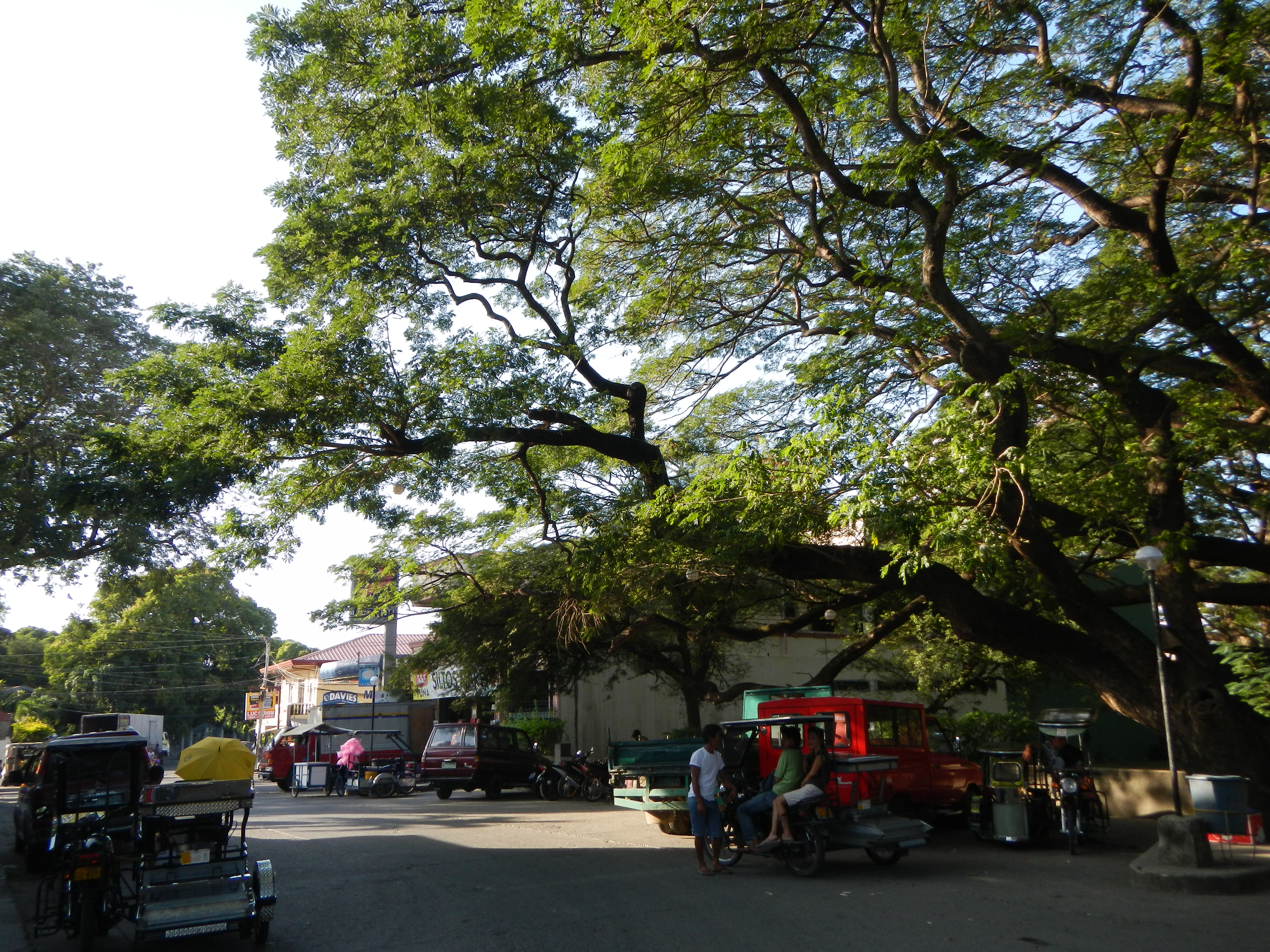
Downtown Calatagan

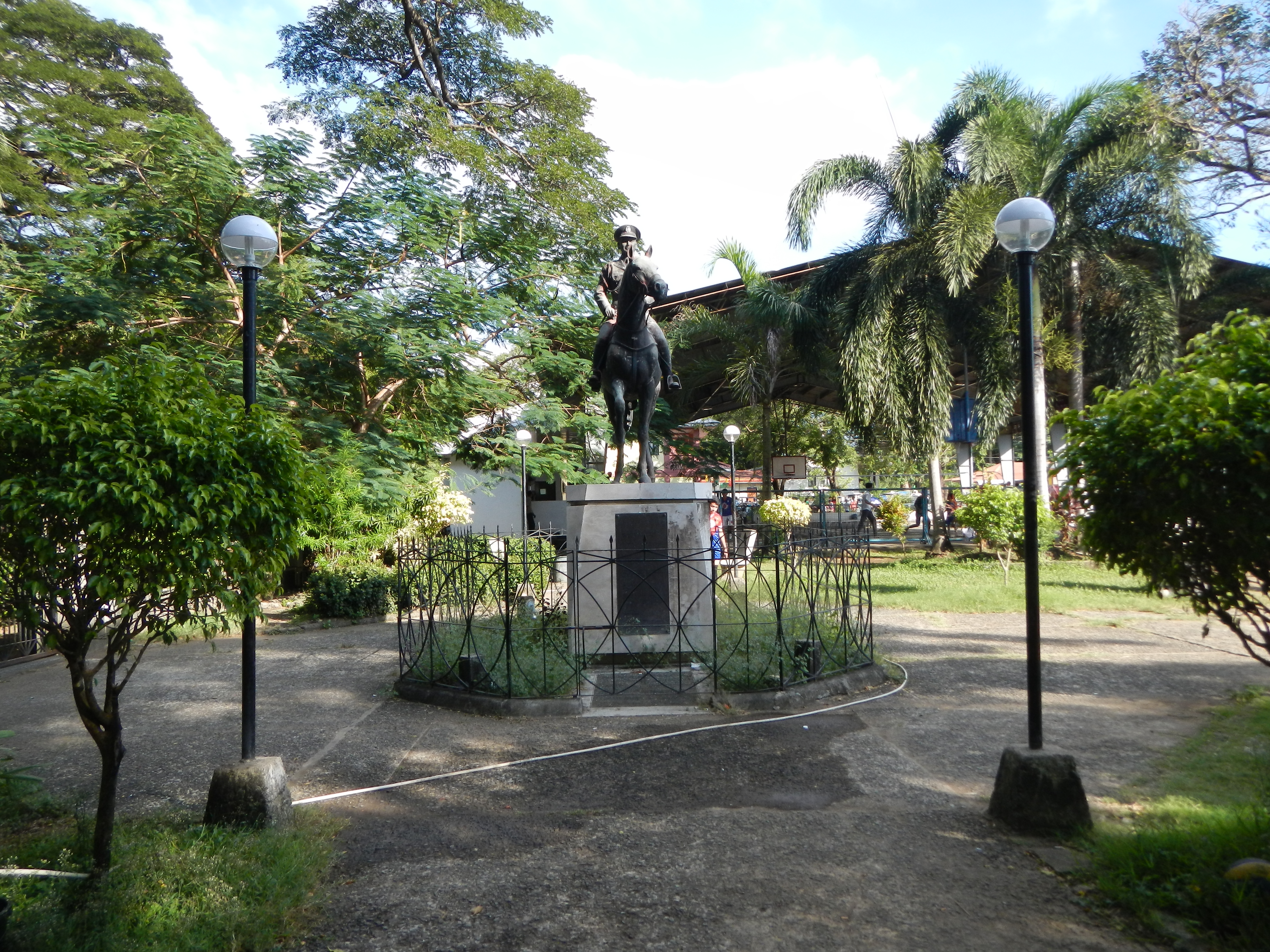
Plaza

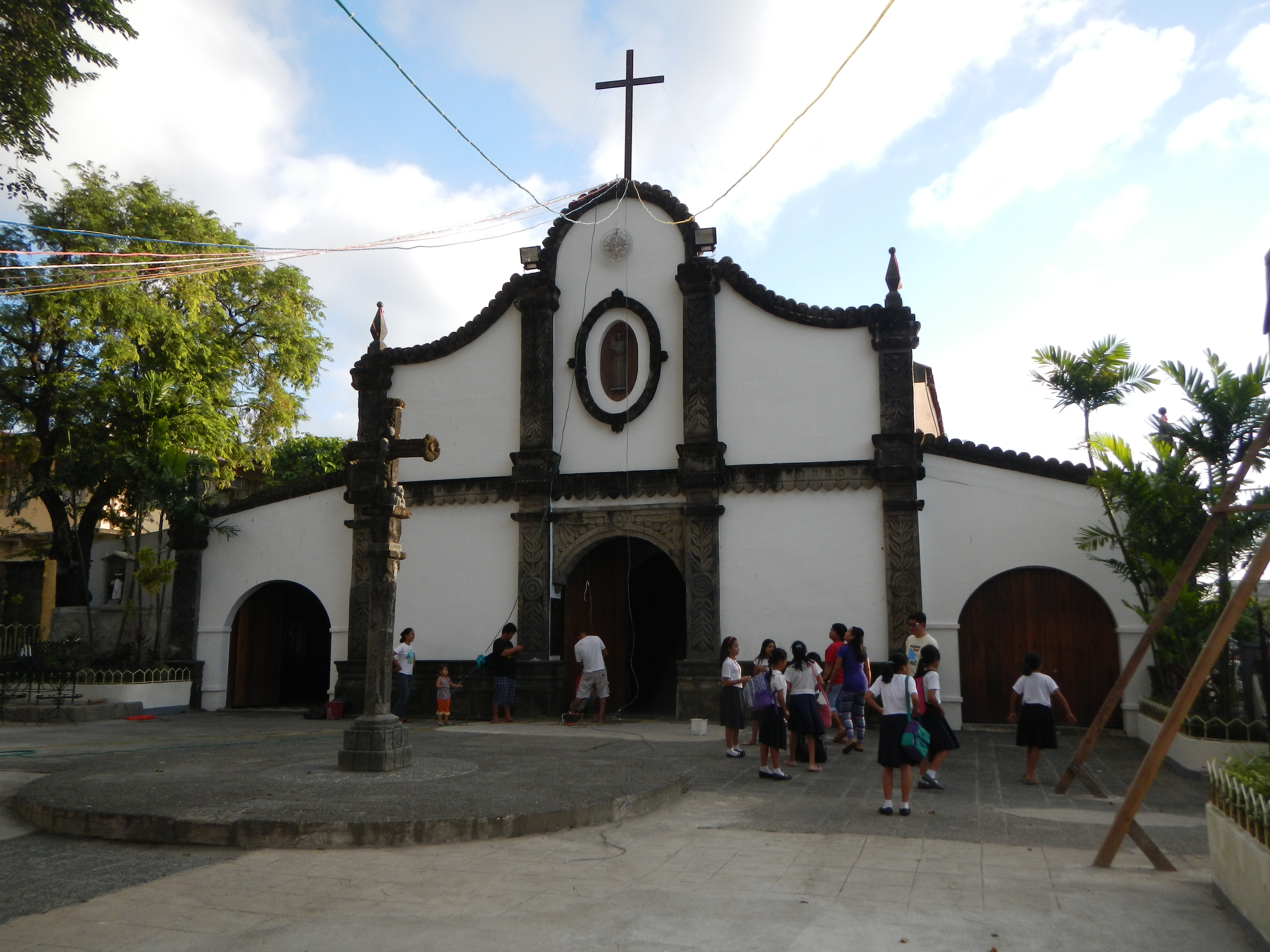
Santo Domingo de Silos Parish Church

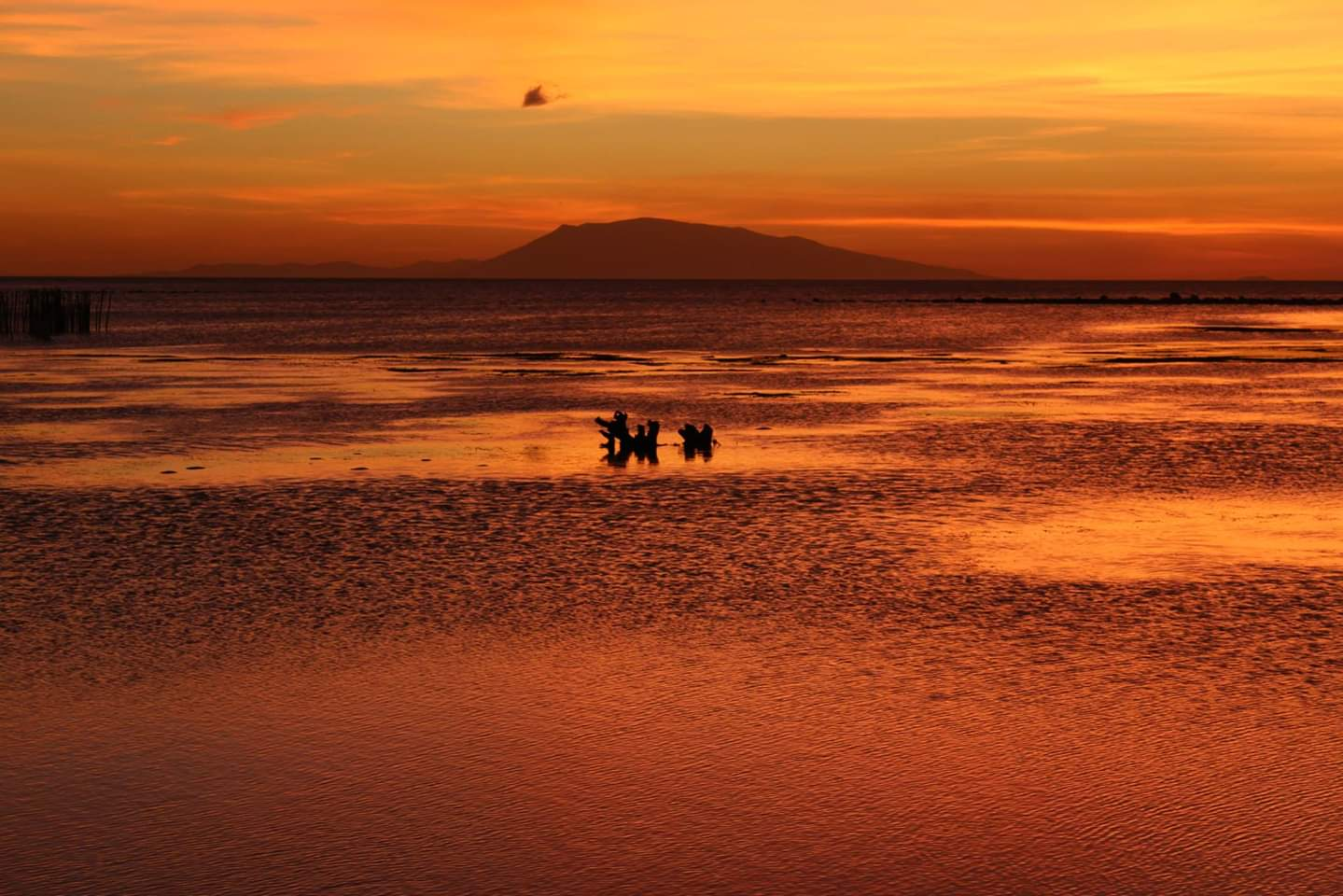
Sunset at a Beach in Calatagan

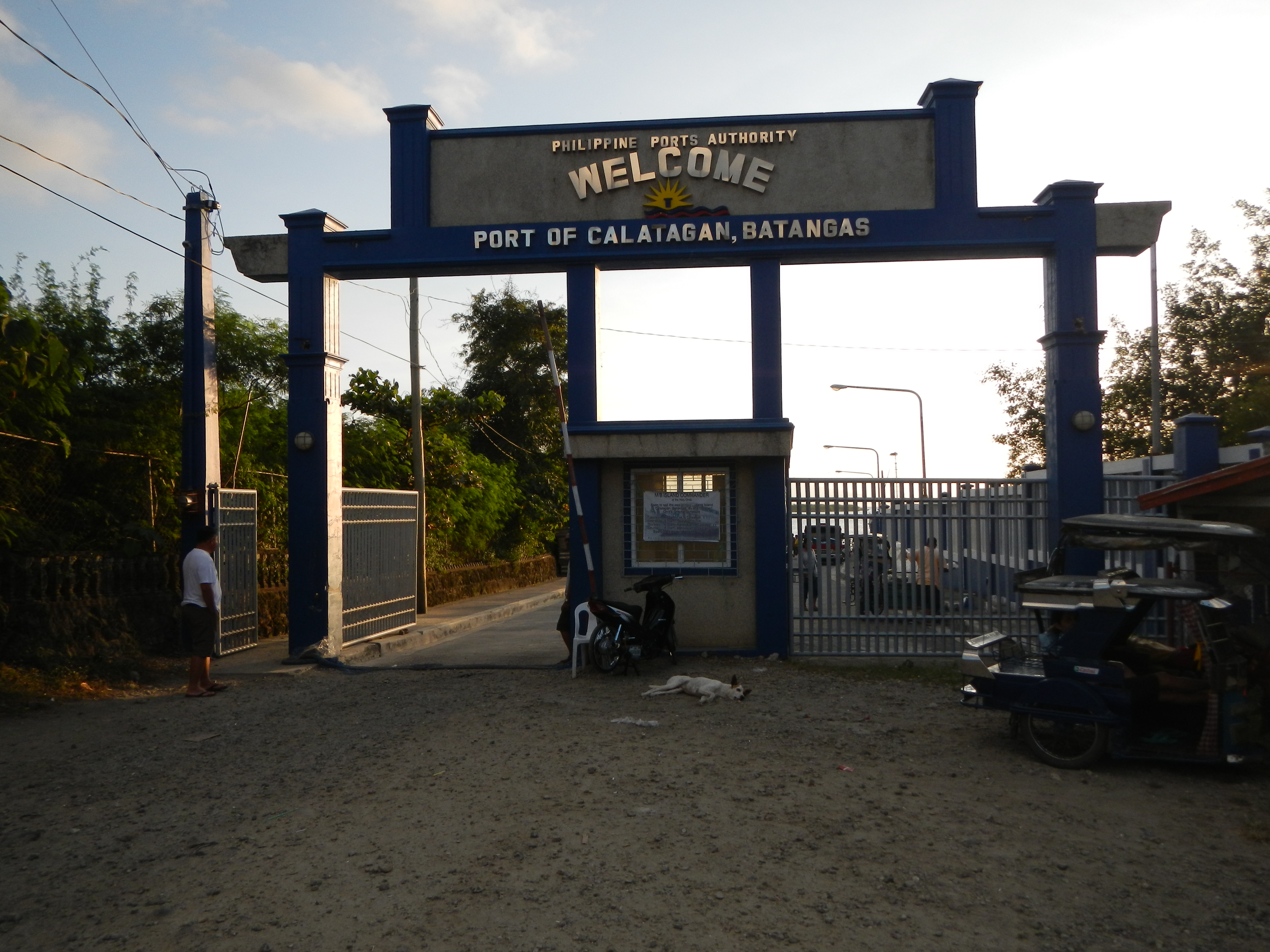
Port of Calatagan
