= Steven Skov Holt =

American design writer, curator and educator (1957–2015)

- Born: Steven Hamilton Holt; September 24, 1957; Hartford, Connecticut, US
- Died: August 13, 2015 (aged 57); San Francisco, California, US
- Education: Stanford University, Brown University
- Known for: Writing, curating, teaching, industrial design
- Spouse: Mara Holt Skov (1997–2015, his death)
- Children: Larson Skov Holt
- Awards: Industrial Designers Society of America
- Website: Steven Skov Holt

Steven Skov Holt (September 24, 1957 – August 13, 2015) was an American design writer, curator, educator and industrial designer. He is known for an interdisciplinary practice that posited the ascension of design as the most significant late-20th- and 21st-century form of public art, and more specifically, elaborated its shift toward forms that were more fluid, biomorphic, hybridized, emotional and culturally literate.

Holt's curatorial projects appeared at museums including the Cooper Hewitt Design Museum, San Francisco Museum of Modern Art (SFMOMA), San Jose Museum of Art and Museum of Contemporary Craft (Portland). He contributed essays, articles and columns to books and magazines such as ARTnews, ID and Metropolis, as well as commentary on design trends to The New York Times, Los Angeles Times, Esquire, and NPR, among others. Holt co-wrote two books, Blobjects & Beyond: The New Fluidity in Design (2005) and Manufractured: The Conspicuous Transformation of Everyday Objects (2008), with his wife, art and design historian Mara Holt Skov. He was a professor for more than two decades in the product design and industrial design departments at the Parsons School of Design and California College of the Arts, respectively. He died in San Francisco on August 13, 2015.

== Life and career ==
Steven Hamilton Holt was born in 1957 in Hartford, Connecticut and grew up in Canton, CT. After high school, he worked as a busboy and attended Boston Architectural College before enrolling at Brown University after receiving financial aid. An avid cyclist at the time, Holt lost his kidney function for unknown reasons in 1979 while at Brown and took a year off to undergo dialysis treatments. After receiving a kidney transplant and recovering, he graduated with a BA in cognitive science in 1982; the experience would compel him to fulfill goals at an accelerated pace throughout his life. Holt remained in good health until the transplanted kidney began to lose function in 1997 after an illness. For the remainder of his life, he experienced many health challenges typical of long-term transplant recipients and would undergo regular and extensive medical treatments.

After Brown, Holt took part in a fellowship at the Cooper Hewitt National Design Museum before beginning work at the industrial design magazine, ID, becoming editor in 1983, a position he held until 1986. From 1986 to 1989, Holt was on the faculty at Parsons School of Design and co-founded the school's product design program. During this time, he was also a partner at the industrial design firm Zebra Design, Inc.

In 1990, Holt moved to the Bay Area to enroll in the graduate program in product design at Stanford University, where he produced a thesis project on sneaker design and earned an MFA in 1992. After Stanford, he worked at the global design consultancy frogdesign from 1992 to 2000, serving in capacities including "visionary," strategist, vice-president of creative culture and general manager. During this time he met and married Mara Skov, and they had a son, Larson.

Holt began teaching at California College of the Arts in 1995, chairing its industrial design program between then and 2004; he was named a distinguished professor in 2003. In 2002, he received the Career Award in Education from the Industrial Designers Society of America. Despite increasingly serious health issues due to the failure of his transplanted kidney, Holt continued to teach and write until his death in 2015.

== Writing and public commentary ==
Between 1986 and 1996, Holt was a columnist for the magazines AXIS, Graphis, Industreel ontwerpen and Metropolitan Home. He wrote reviews, articles and features for Architectural Record, ARTnews, ID Innovation and Metropolis, among others, on designers and product design firms, conceptual design projects, contemplative biology, and a flexible, eccentric postmodern design philosophy he called "Post-Credible," among many topics. His feature for ARTnews, "The Art of Design," posited design as the new frontier of artistic activity merging technology and aesthetics and was the magazine's first cover story about design. Holt's output also included wide-ranging catalogue and book essays on contemporary visual culture.

Holt and Skov's books Blobjects & Beyond (2005) and Manufractured (2008) were written to accompany exhibitions they curated. "Blobject" (blobby + object) was a term and concept Holt developed in the late 1980s to describe a trend of rounded and melting designed objects (e.g., automobiles, house and office wares) that represented a decisive turn from the hard edges of conventional modernism. Blobjects & Beyond analyzes these fluid, curved, often biomorphic forms, which the authors characterized as a "new futurism" embodying "possibility, hope and optimism." Identifying roots in movements such as Surrealism, mid-century American organic design and 1960s psychedelia, the book traces the flowering of blobjects to a convergence of the organic, technological and aesthetic, made possible by advances in computer-aided design, plastics and manufacturing. In a Wired review, Suzanne Wu wrote, "Blobjects avoids art book snobbishness by focusing its ivory tower analysis on the sensual side of everyday products ... [Holt and Skov] make a compelling case for curvaceous design as a manifestation of our desires."

Manufractured explored an emerging approach in art that involved the sampling and appropriation of new and scavenged consumer products to create new works. Holt and Skov coined the term to describe processes—often painstaking handcrafting techniques of cutting, stacking, tying, folding, stitching or molding—that alter or fragment (physically and contextually) banal, mass-produced goods, transforming them into artworks. San Francisco Chronicle writer Zahid Sardar called the book "perhaps the first great defense of craft" in the design world.

With reference to his roles as a design professional, curator, writer and educator, Holt often provided commentary to journalists about past, present and future design trends, among them: the miniaturization and personalization of office technologies and home products; preferences in materials; personal computer, sneaker, bicycle, automobile and other industrial design; the effects of digital technology on designed objects; and design education.

== Curatorial projects ==
Like his writing, Holt's curatorial projects highlighted rising trends in design, visual culture and consumer taste. "Pride of Place Setting" (1987) was an exhibition of freely mixed tableware that celebrated a recent turn by well-known architects, artists and designers to tabletop design as a vehicle for personal expression and experimentation. Holt described the emergence of style and fashion in everyday objects as "design democracy in action."

In 2000, Holt co-curated the first Cooper Hewitt National Design Triennial, "Design Culture Now," with Donald Albrecht and Ellen Lupton. The exhibition marked a boundary-blurring, digital-era design shift away from "the ubiquitous 'black box' of minimalism" and toward human, tactile and emotional work reflecting entertainment culture and the growing visual literacy of consumers. New York Times critic Herbert Muschamp wrote, "The triennial is an explosion: an attack on the walls between individual design disciplines and the barriers that separate design from everything else. ... [Its] organizers create a credible mythology for design today: protean, expansive, filled with deep reserves of historical meaning, an art that leaves no area of consciousness unexplored." The same year, Holt co-curated (with Aaron Betsky) "Design Afoot: Athletic Shoes, 1995-2000" at SFMOMA—believed to be the first exhibition devoted to sneaker design—marking what he called "a golden age in sneaker design."

Holt co-curated two exhibitions with Mara Holt Skov, "Blobjects & Beyond" (San Jose Museum of Art, 2005) and "Manufractured" (Museum of Contemporary Craft, 2008). The former surveyed a new, technology-influenced fluidity across design categories and products, presenting amorphic, organic, curvy and protoplasmic forms ranging from the iMac G3 to Marc Newson's Lockheed Lounge and "cutensils" to a Smart Car. "Manufractured" gathered the work of an International group of artists who appropriated abundant, off-the-shelf manufactured or recycled products and packaging as raw materials, among them Harriete Estel Berman, Constantin and Laurene Leon Boym and Sonya Clark. The Christian Science Monitor characterized the show as "a compelling case for a new movement" of "eloquent and unexpected art" whose time-honored artmaking strategies of craft, process, repetition and variation commented on consumerism and the culture at large.

== Design work ==
Holt worked at several industrial design firms in his career, including at Zebra Design, Inc. in New York as a partner from 1987 to 1989. His early work often involved rethinking everyday objects such as clocks and chairs with playful, colorful eccentric or referential designs; among his projects were the minimalist Zelco Real Wall Clock, an interactive clock with removable magnetic symbols, and collaborative conceptual chairs that embraced hybrid and symbolic forms. In 1992, he joined the Silicon Valley office of the global firm frogdesign with the title of "visionary"; he also served as director of strategy, vice-president of creative culture and general manager until leaving in 2000 for health reasons. During his time there, he was involved in designs for the award-winning Acer Aspire computer and clients including Apple, Hasbro, IBM, Logitech and Packard Bell.

== Books ==
- Blobjects & Beyond: The New Fluidity in Design, San Francisco: Chronicle Books, 2005. Written with Mara Holt Skov.
- Manufractured: The Conspicuous Transformation of Everyday Objects, San Francisco: Chronicle Books, 2008. Written with Mara Holt Skov.
