= Tourism in Metro Manila =

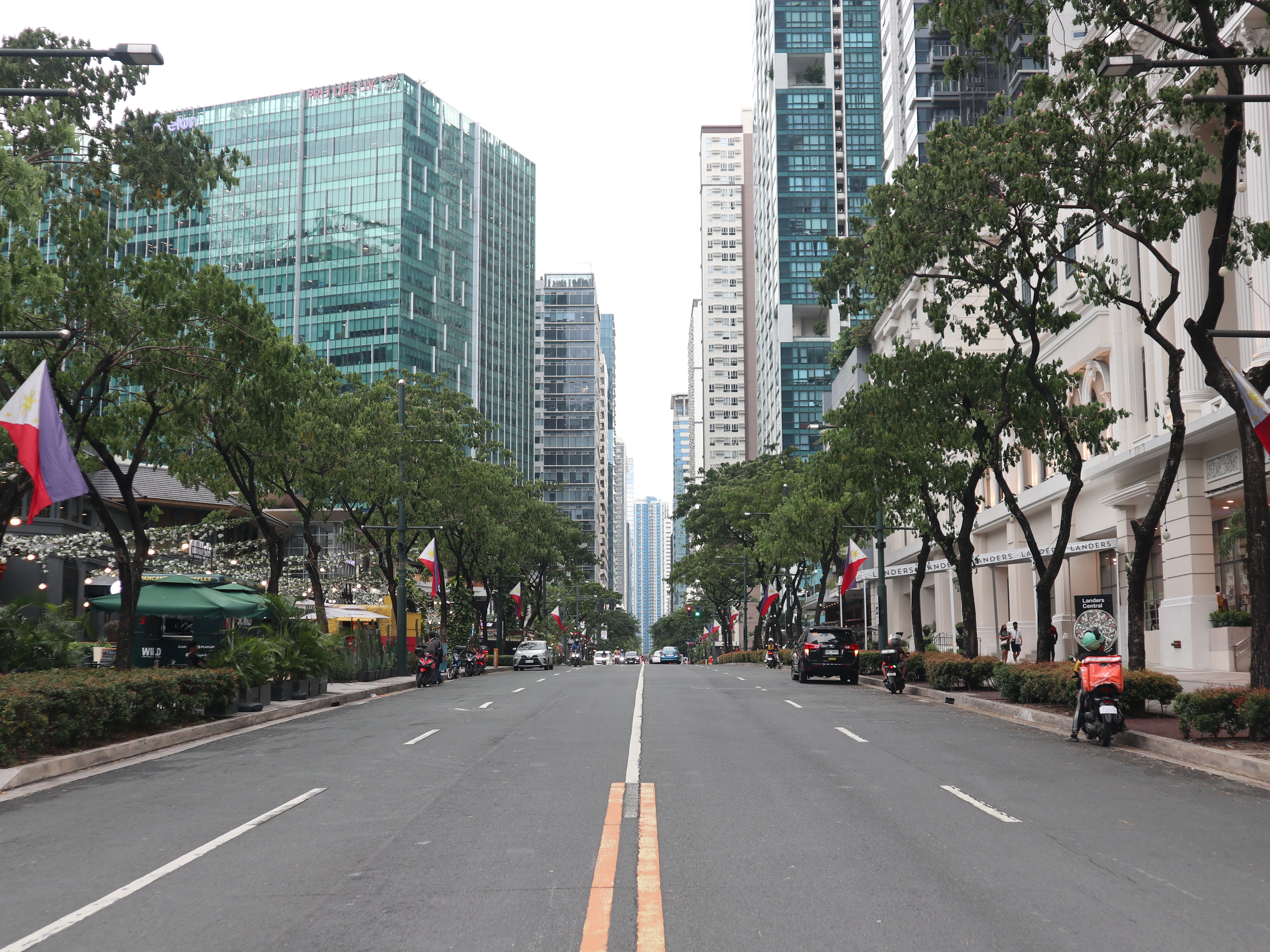
11th Avenue in Bonifacio Global City in Taguig. BGC attract foreign and domestic tourists for its luxury shopping amenities and nightlife scenes.

In Metro Manila, Philippines, tourism is a significant industry. In 2012, the city and the region welcomed 974,379 overnight visitors. Serving as the main gateway to the Philippines' numerous destinations, the city attracts mainly international tourists, with a total of 3,139,756 visitors in 2012. Global Blue ranks Manila as the eleventh 'Best Shopping Destination' in Asia. The city holds the tenth position in MasterCard's global top 20 fastest-growing cities for international visitors from 2009 to 2013.

== Attractions ==
Metro Manila contains several notable attractions including a UNESCO World Heritage Site and 45 other cultural heritage landmarks. These cultural attractions are mostly concentrated in the City of Manila and have connections to the city's Chinese, Spanish, and American origins. Popular sites include the Spanish colonial buildings in Intramuros, the World Heritage Site of San Agustin Church, Rizal Park, and a few Art Deco and Revival style buildings like National Museum of Anthropology, National Museum of Fine Arts, and National Museum of Natural History. Manila also has more than 380 historical markers of historic people, places, and events, more than any other place in the country. Metro Manila has a total of more than 520 markers.

There are also modern attractions in the metropolis such as the Manila Ocean Park, the integrated resort complex of Resorts World Manila, and the newly opened Solaire Resort & Casino, City of Dreams Manila and Okada Manila in Entertainment City.

=== Within the City of Manila ===
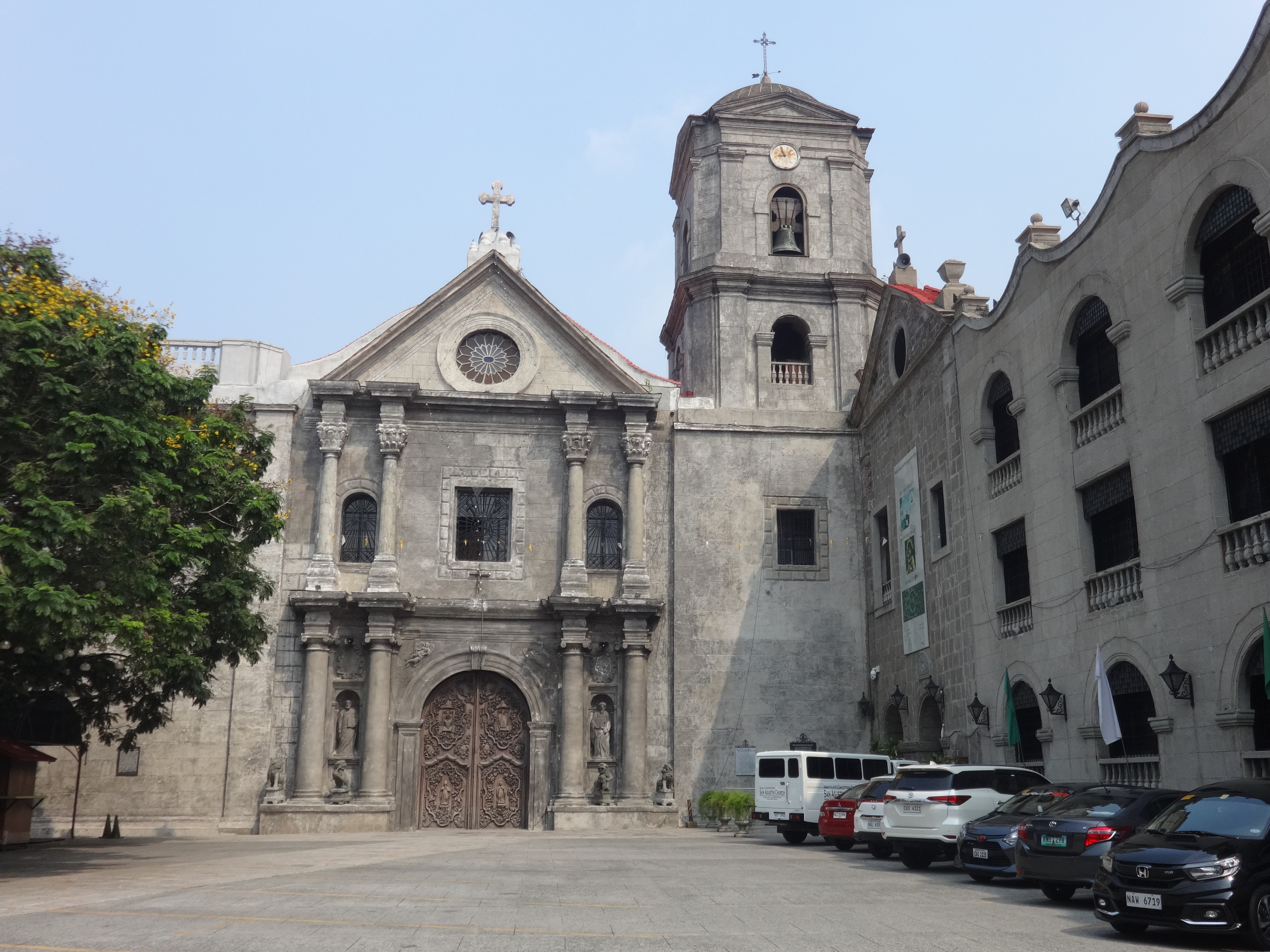
San Agustin Church in Intramuros, a UNESCO World Heritage Site

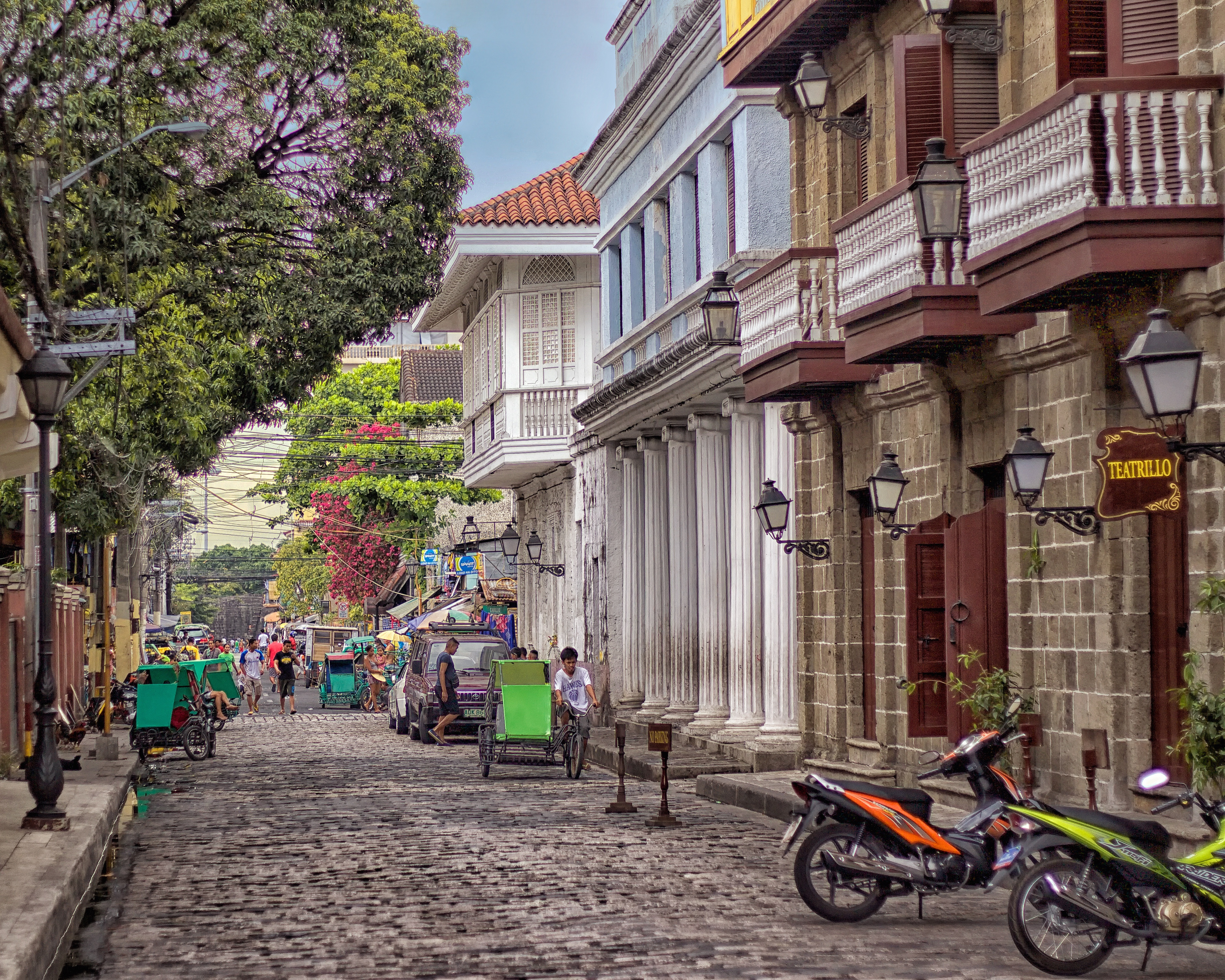
Intramuros

Intramuros is a historic fortified complex housing Manila's oldest colonial structures. Tourist attractions within the complex include Fort Santiago, a Spanish citadel located at the mouth of the Pasig River near Manila Cathedral — an ecclesiastical building dating back to the 19th century, serving as the seat of the Roman Catholic Archdiocese of Manila. Additionally, San Agustin Church, recognized as a UNESCO World Heritage Site, adds to the historical significance of the area.

Just outside Intramuros lies Rizal Park, a historical urban park spanning 58 hectares (140 acres) along Roxas Boulevard. At the heart of the park stands the Rizal Monument, serving as a memorial to the Philippine national hero, José Rizal. Museums in Manila include the National Museum of Anthropology, featuring anthropology and archaeology exhibits; the National Museum of Fine Arts, formerly known as the National Art Gallery; and the National Museum of Natural History, offering insights into Philippine history.

The districts of Ermita and Malate form Manila's center for culture, commerce, entertainment, and tourism. Ermita, situated outside the walls of Intramuros near Luneta, houses major government buildings and numerous hotels. The Manila Ocean Park, an oceanarium with a marine-themed mall and hotel, is located behind the Quirino Grandstand, which fronts Rizal Park. Malate, renowned as the tourism center of Manila, is famous for the Baywalk and the nightlife district along Adriatico Street. The district also hosts the Manila Zoo, the oldest zoo and botanical garden in the Philippines. Binondo, an ancient district known as Manila's Chinatown, has been established since 1521, featuring attractions such as Binondo Church, Escolta Street, Divisoria, and various Chinese restaurants. Quiapo is home to Quiapo Church, housing the Black Nazarene, while the San Sebastian Church in Quiapo stands as the only all-steel Gothic basilica in Asia.

Major parks in Manila include Paco Park, a recreational garden that was once a Spanish cemetery located in the district of Paco. Along the banks of the Pasig River, Malacañang Palace serves as the official residence of the President of the Philippines.

=== Other parts of Metro Manila ===
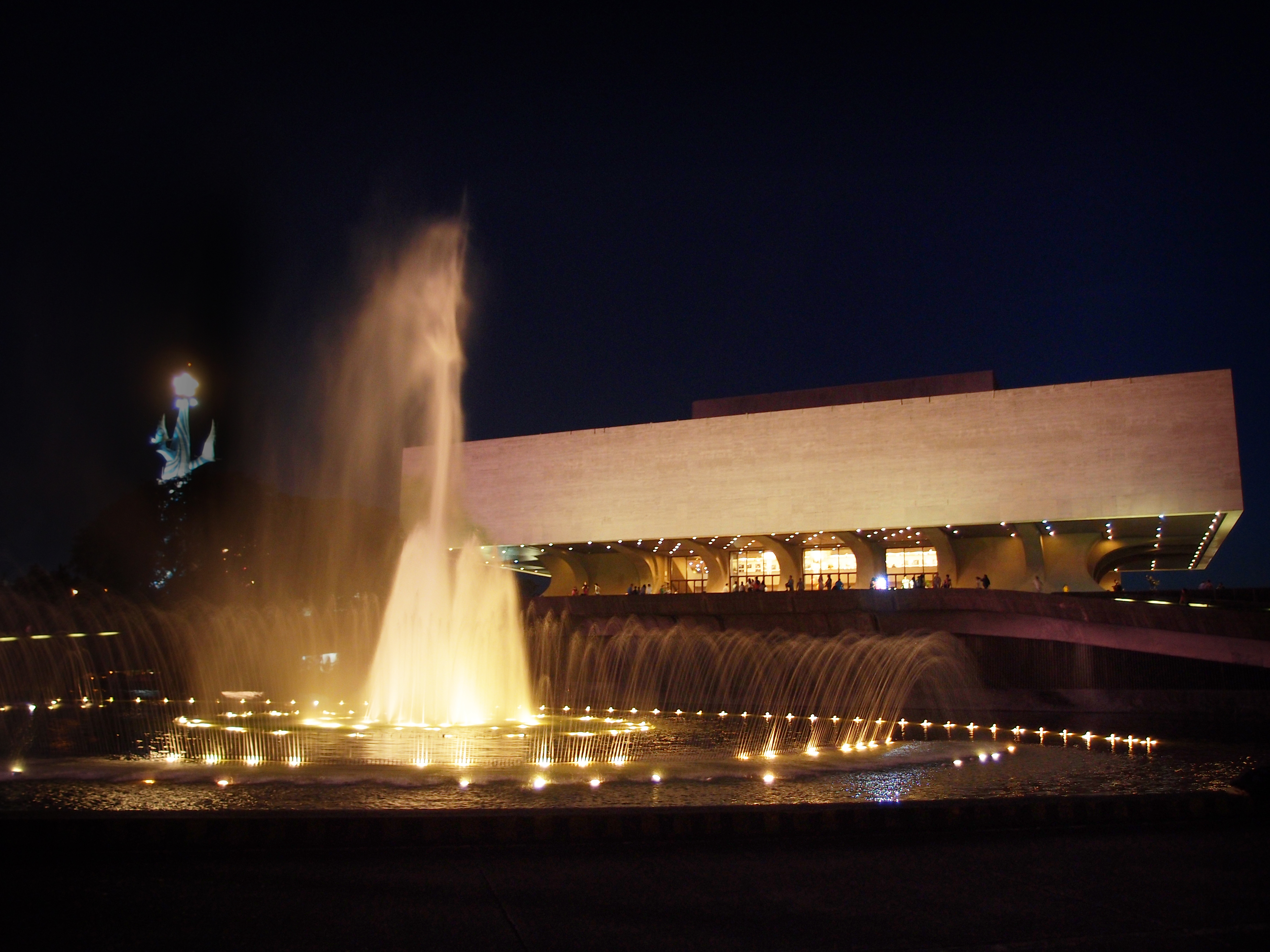
The Tanghalang Pambansa (national theater)

Makati CBD, one of Southeast Asia's largest financial hubs, is renowned for its cosmopolitan culture. Serving as a major cultural and entertainment hub in Metro Manila, the city plays a pivotal role in the region's economic landscape. Additionally, the business districts of Ortigas Center and Bonifacio Global City are significant cultural, financial, and entertainment hubs in the metropolis.

Bay City, situated along Manila Bay, stands as an entertainment and leisure hub. Home to prominent destinations such as SM Mall of Asia, Aseana City, and the evolving Entertainment City, designed as a Las Vegas-like gaming and entertainment complex. This development features world-class integrated resorts and casinos, including Solaire Resort & Casino, City of Dreams Manila, Okada Manila, with additional establishments still under construction. Bay City is also home to the Cultural Center of the Philippines Complex, a 62-hectare (150-acre) arts and culture district along the scenic Manila Bay.

== Shopping and gambling ==
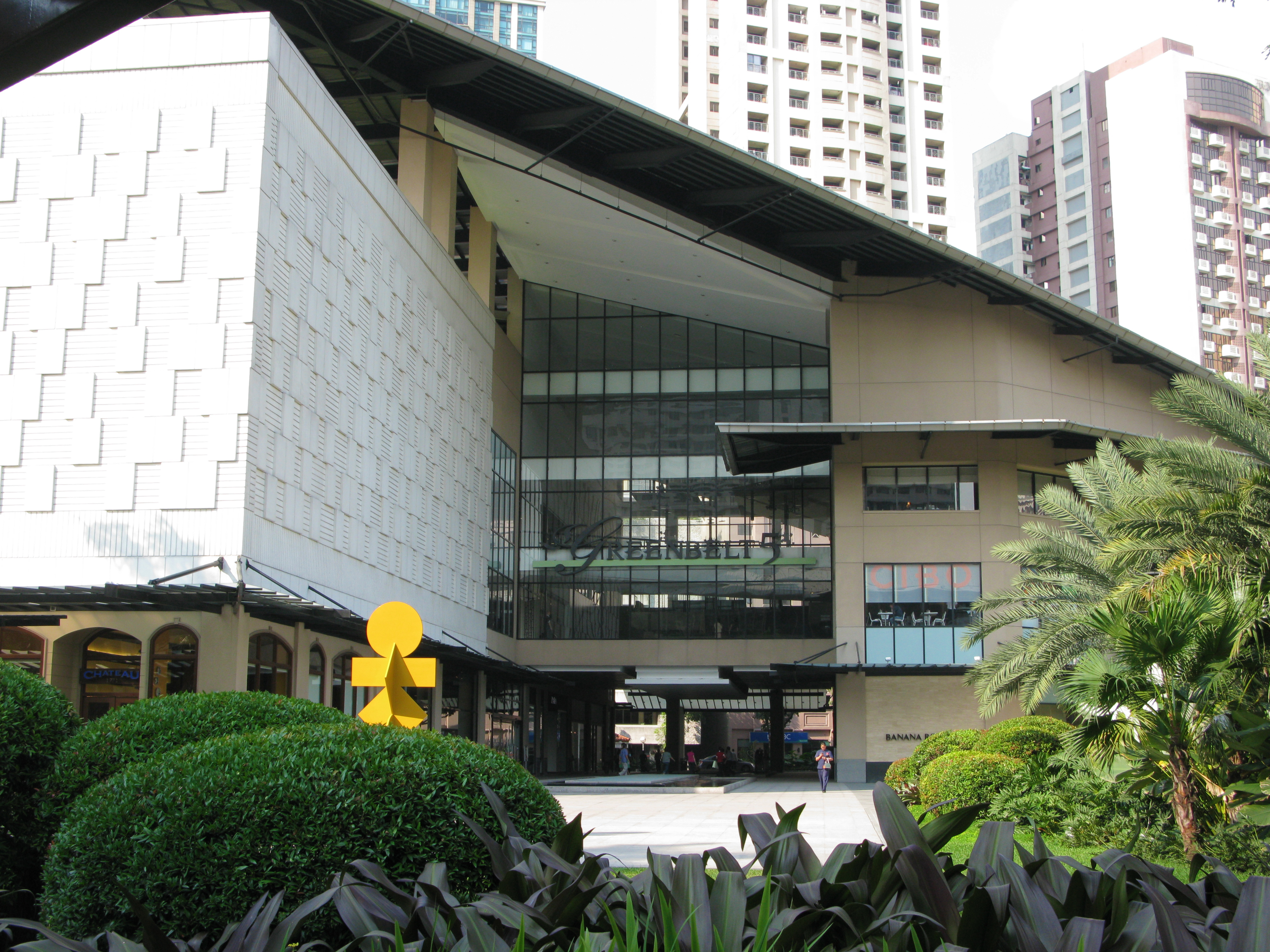
Greenbelt

Manila is the main shopping hub of the Philippines and is one of the well-known shopping destinations in the Asia-Pacific region. Numerous shopping centers are located around the metropolis and are usually clustered in major shopping districts such as the Bonifacio Global City and Ortigas Center while upscale-luxury shopping centers are concentrated in the business and financial district of Ayala Center. Traditional markets still remain a presence in Manila such as bazaars and markets.

A number of hotels and casinos can be found around Metro Manila. Makati, the financial hub of the metropolis is home to numerous international hotel chains. Manila is also home to various casinos and is becoming a major gaming destination in the region. A gaming and entertainment complex called Entertainment City will be home to four integrated casino resorts, this major development is expected to attract more tourists and rival other major gaming destinations in Asia such as Macau and Singapore.

== Parks and plazas ==
Manila offers a wide selection of parks and plazas. The county's premier park, Rizal Park is located in the heart of the city. The park was the site of the execution of the country's national hero, Jose Rizal. Apart from Rizal Park, there also other parks located around Metro Manila such as Quezon Memorial Circle in Quezon City and the Ayala Triangle Gardens in Makati. Plazas are usually found in the districts of Manila, notable ones are Plaza Miranda, Plaza de Roma, Plaza Rajah Sulayman and Plaza San Lorenzo Ruiz.

Parks and Plazas of Metro Manila

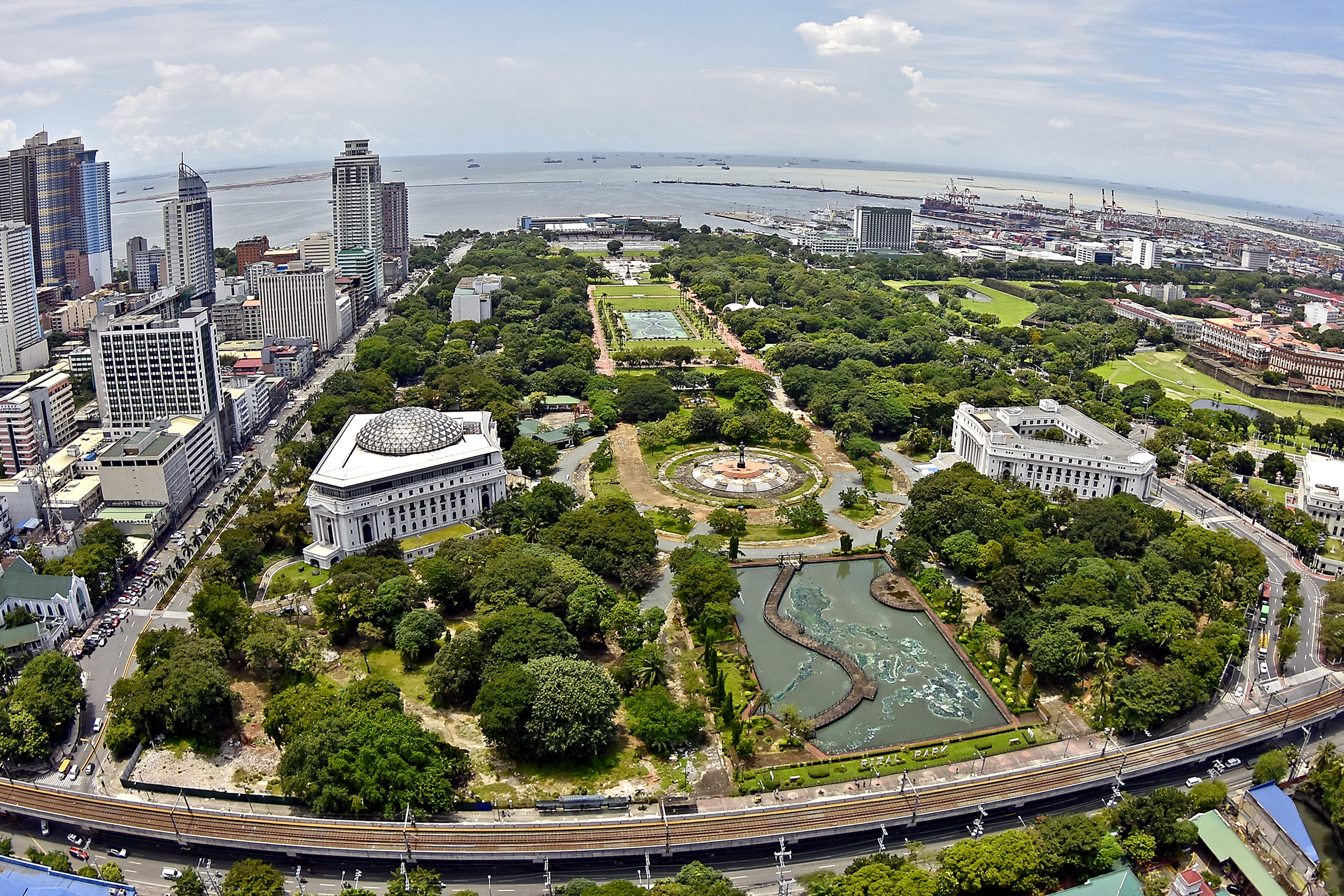
Aerial view of Rizal Park

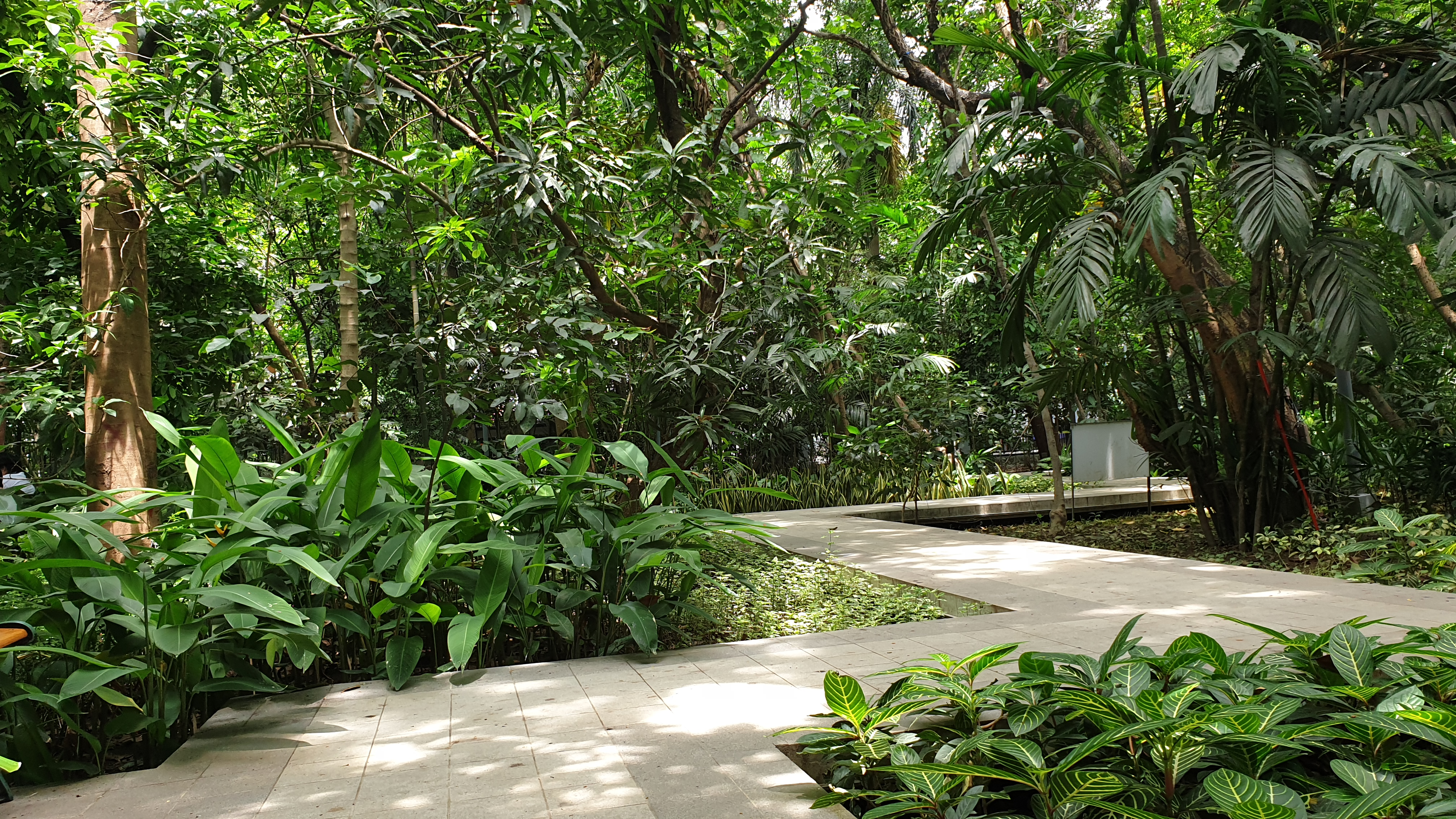
Arroceros Urban Forest Park

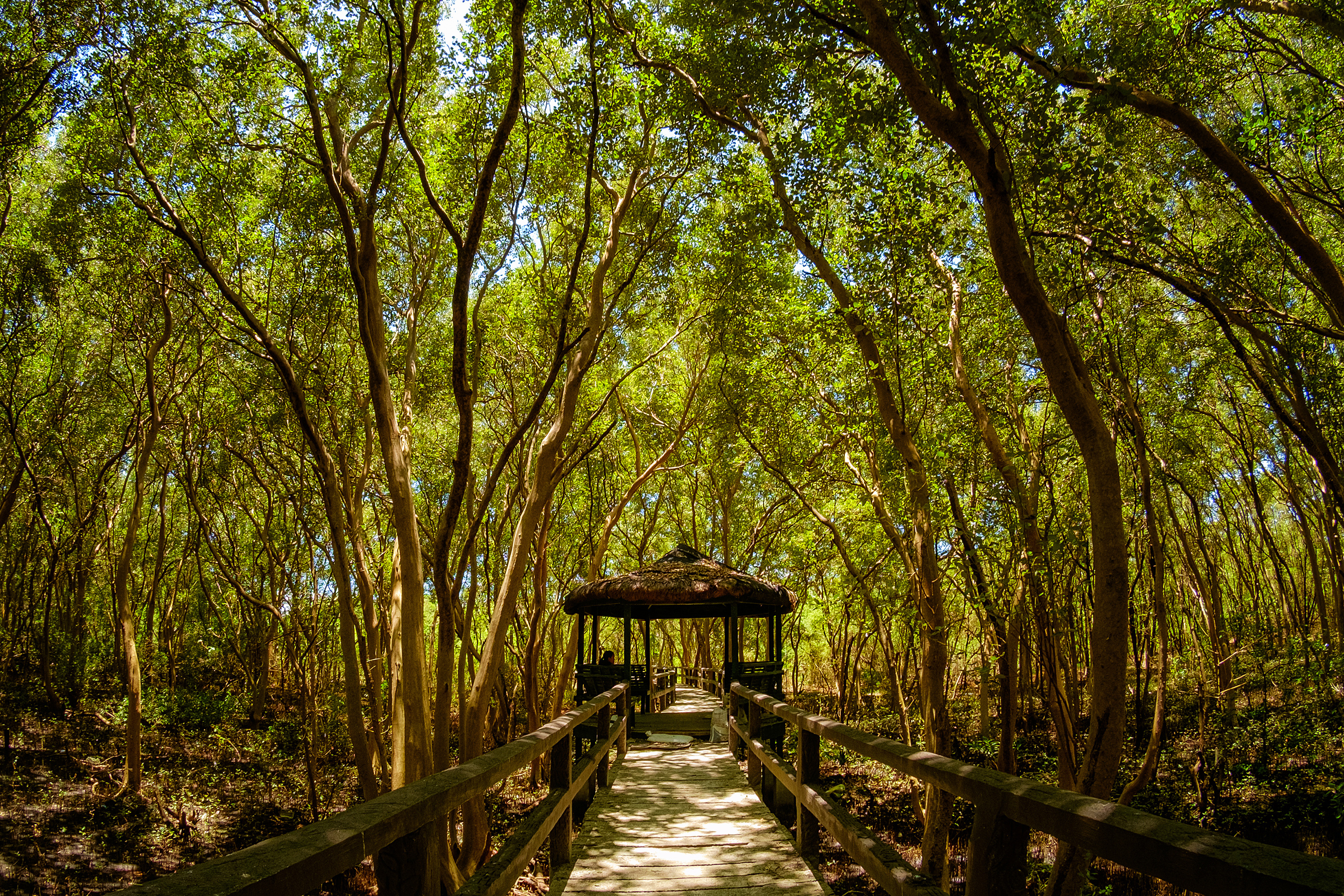
Las Piñas–Parañaque Wetland Park

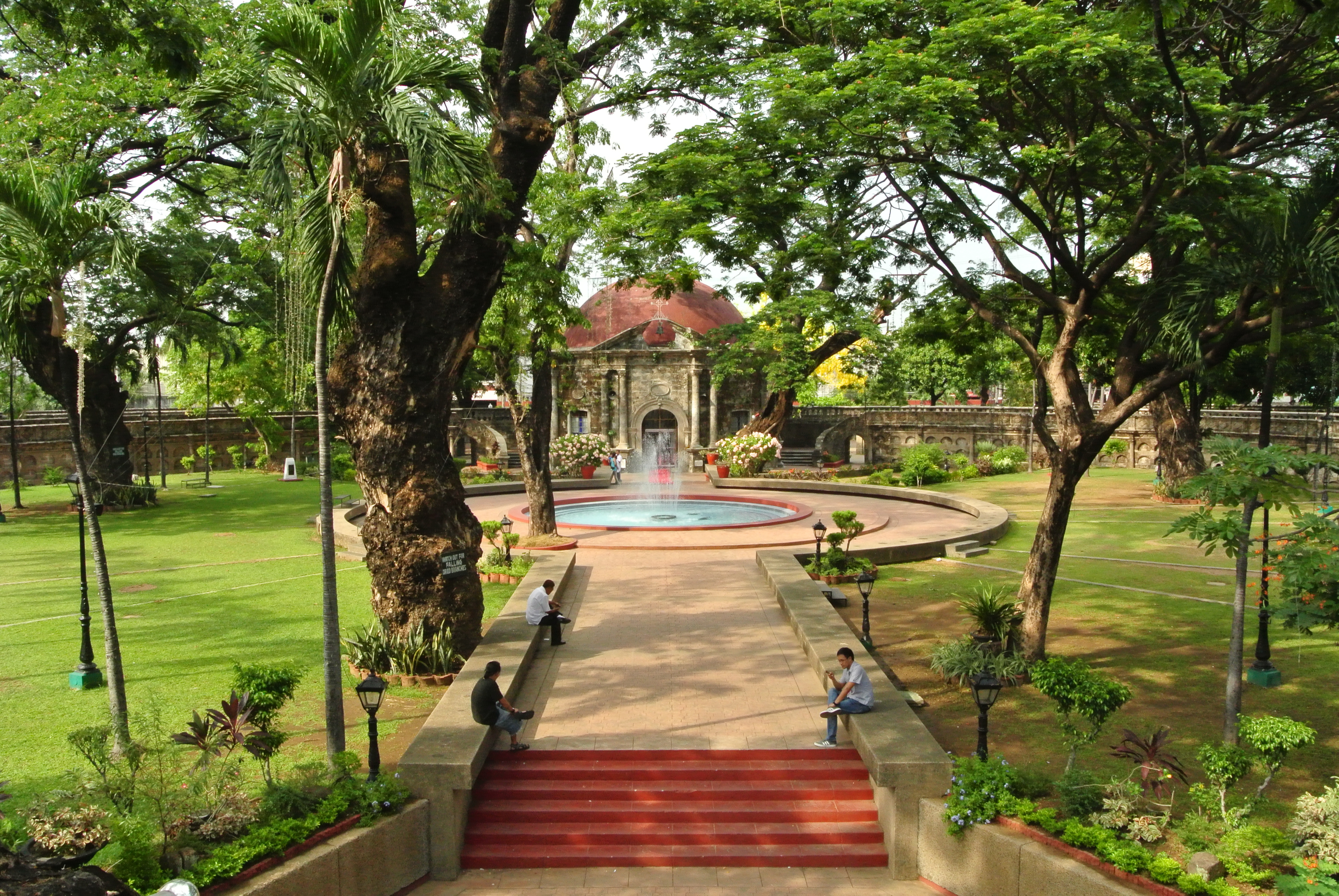
Paco Park

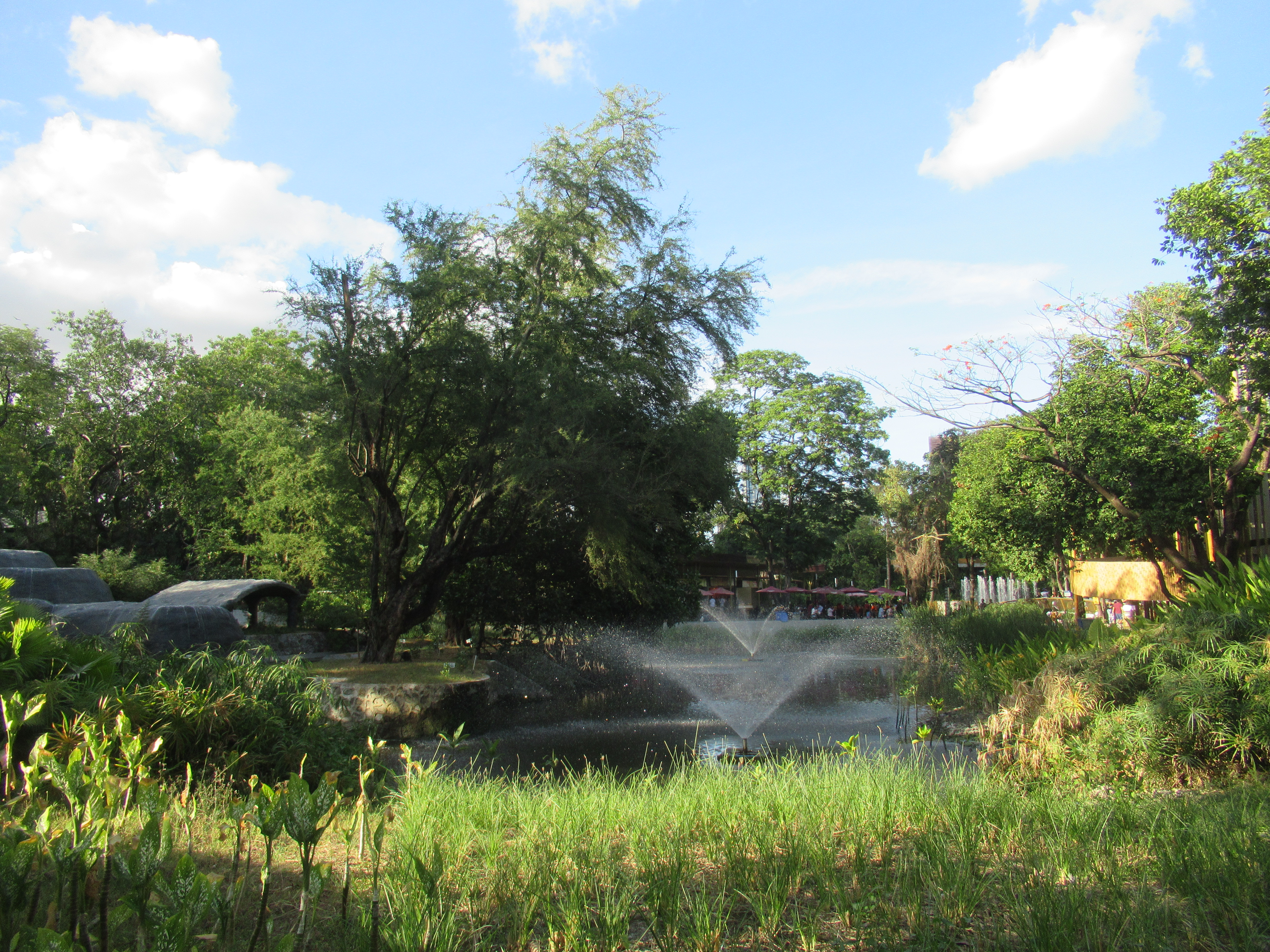
Manila Zoo

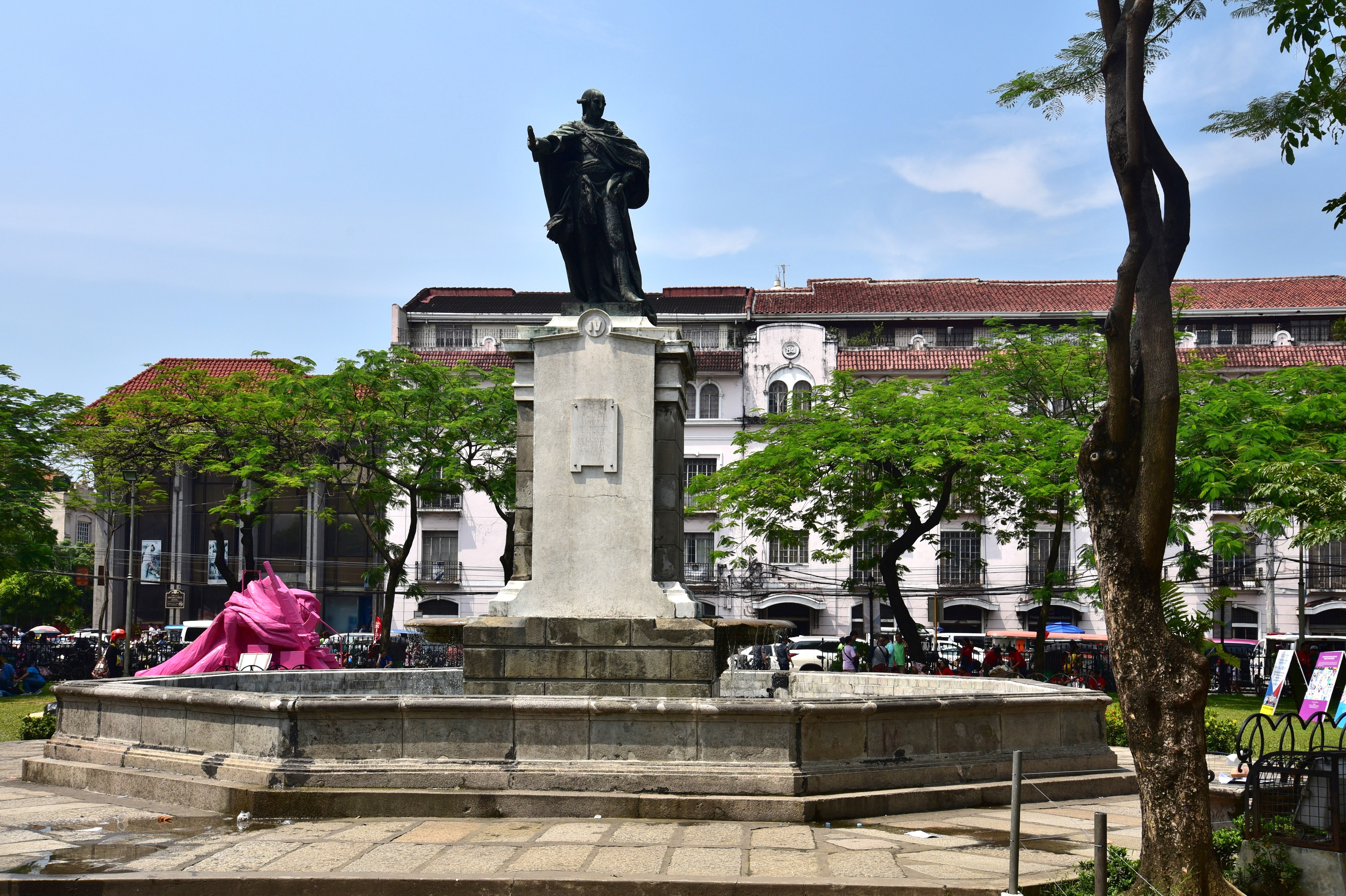
Plaza de Roma

== Events ==
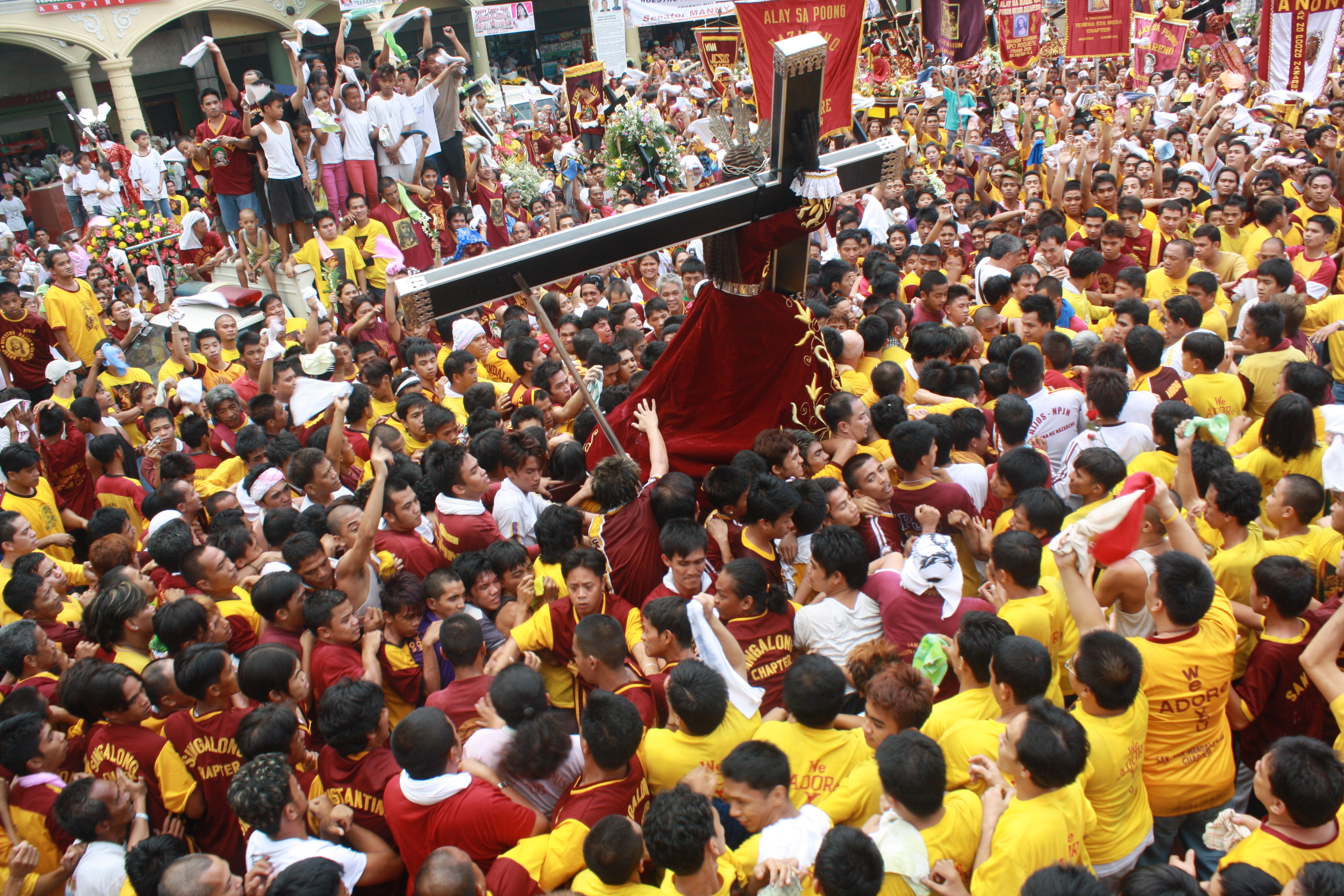
The procession of the Black Nazarene of Manila

Festivals in Metro Manila include the Feast of the Black Nazarene, which is held every January in Quiapo district, and it is the biggest religious festival in the city. Chinese New Year is celebrated in Binondo district, the world's oldest Chinatown. Aliwan Fiesta is held annually in the Cultural Center of the Philippines complex, and it is a celebration of Filipino culture through dance parades, floats, and pageants.
Film festivals include Cinemanila International Film Festival, which is the biggest global film event in Manila. Cinemalaya Philippine Independent Film Festival is another film festival held annually in July at the Cultural Center of the Philippines. Metro Manila Film Festival is held every December during Christmas, and it is an all-Filipino-language film event.
Other events include Manila International Auto Show, the Philippines' biggest motor show at the World Trade Center Metro Manila, and the Philippine International Pyromusical Competition, an annual competition among the world's fireworks companies held in SM Mall of Asia by Manila Bay.

== See also ==
- List of Cultural Properties of the Philippines in Metro Manila
- List of museums in Metro Manila
- List of Roman Catholic churches in Metro Manila
- List of beaches in the Greater Manila Area
- Tourism in the Philippines
- City of Man
