= List of beaches in the Greater Manila Area =

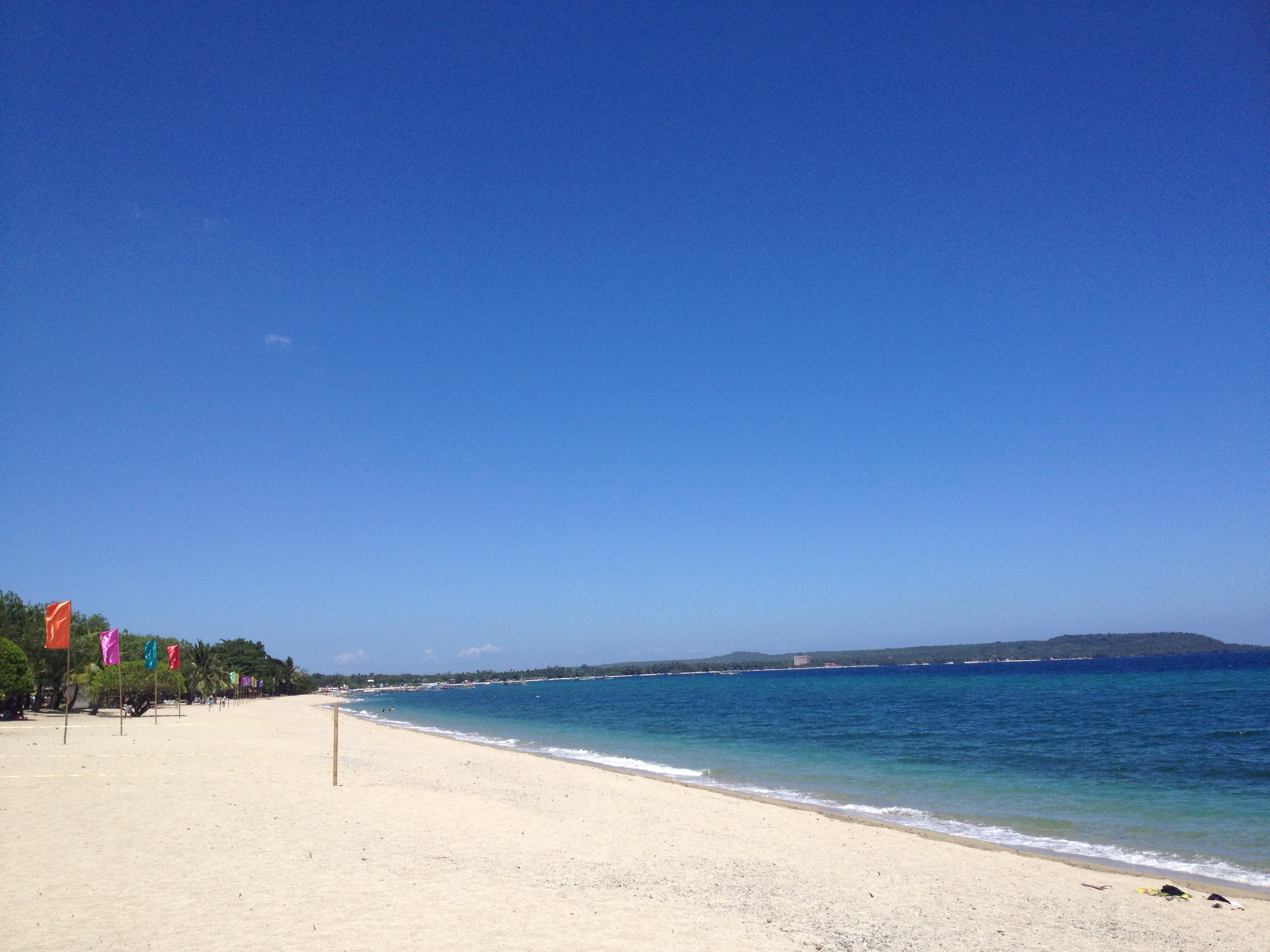
Laiya Beach in San Juan, Batangas

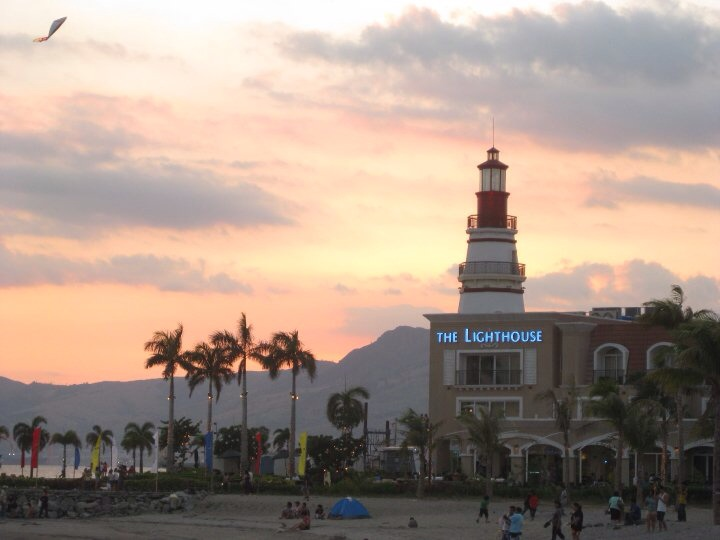
Subic Bay Freeport Zone Boardwalk Beach

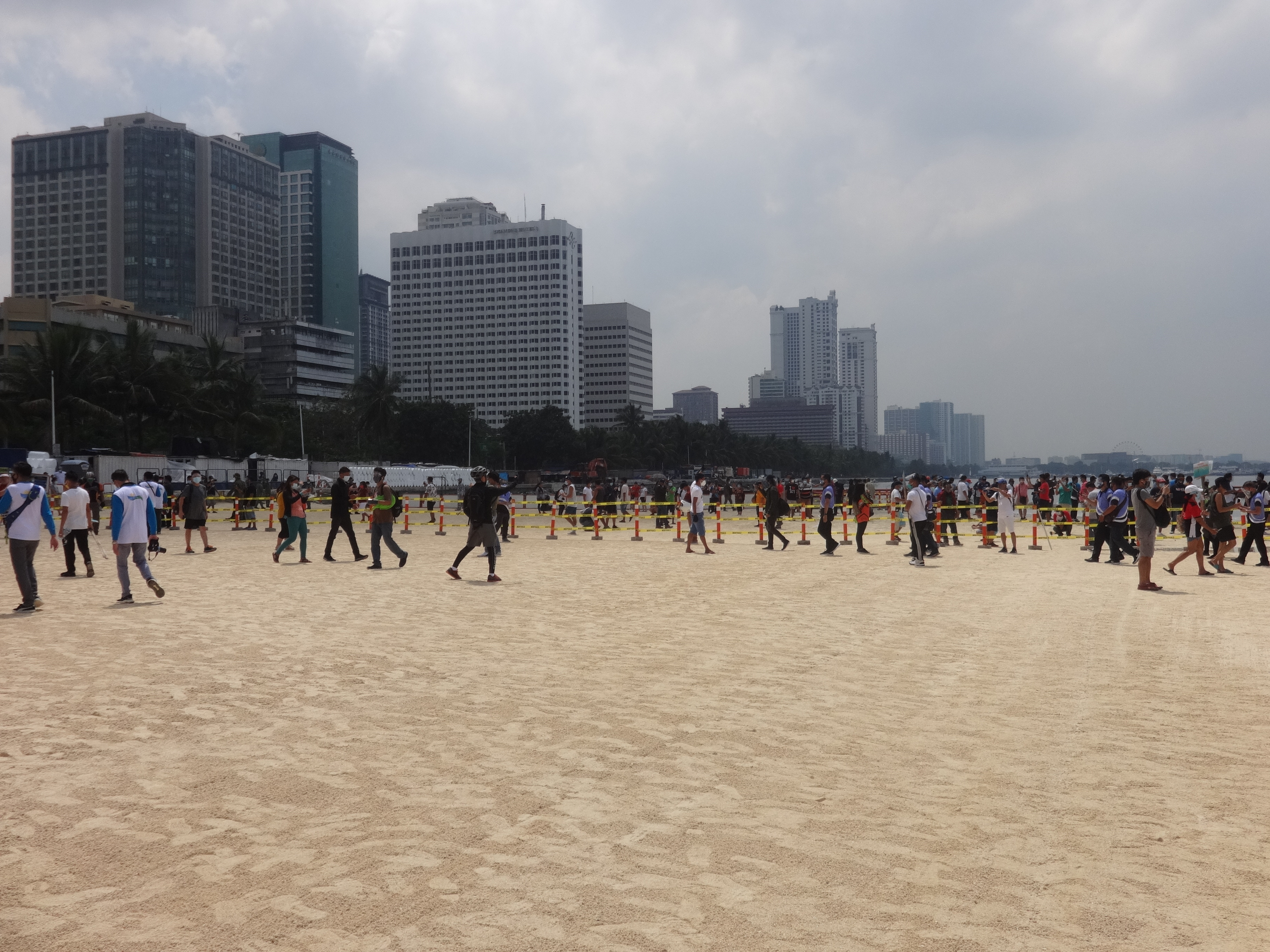
An artificial beach along Manila Bay, created in 2020

This is a list of beaches in the Greater Manila Area.

Manila, the capital city of the Philippines, is located on an isthmus between Manila Bay, which opens to the South China Sea to the west, and Laguna de Bay to the east. It shares a long coastline with surrounding provinces dotted with many coves and beaches. Manila Bay was also once ringed with sandy beaches, notably the area of Pineda (Pasay), Tambo (Parañaque) and San Roque (now Cavite City). However, increased urbanization and unchecked industrialization in the last century has led to serious water quality degradation making the whole area unsafe for swimming. Land reclamation has also permanently closed these once natural beaches.

Today, most of the beaches in this region are found in the surrounding provinces in the Greater Manila Area within a 100-mile radius from the capital city. The most prominent beaches are found in Batangas in the south, and Bataan and Zambales in the north particularly those of Nasugbu, San Juan, Calatagan, Subic, San Antonio, Morong, Mariveles and Bagac. Artificial beaches have also been created along the shores of Manila Bay, known simply as Manila Bay Beach, and at the Paris Beach Club of Azure Urban Resort Residences in Parañaque.

== North mainland ==
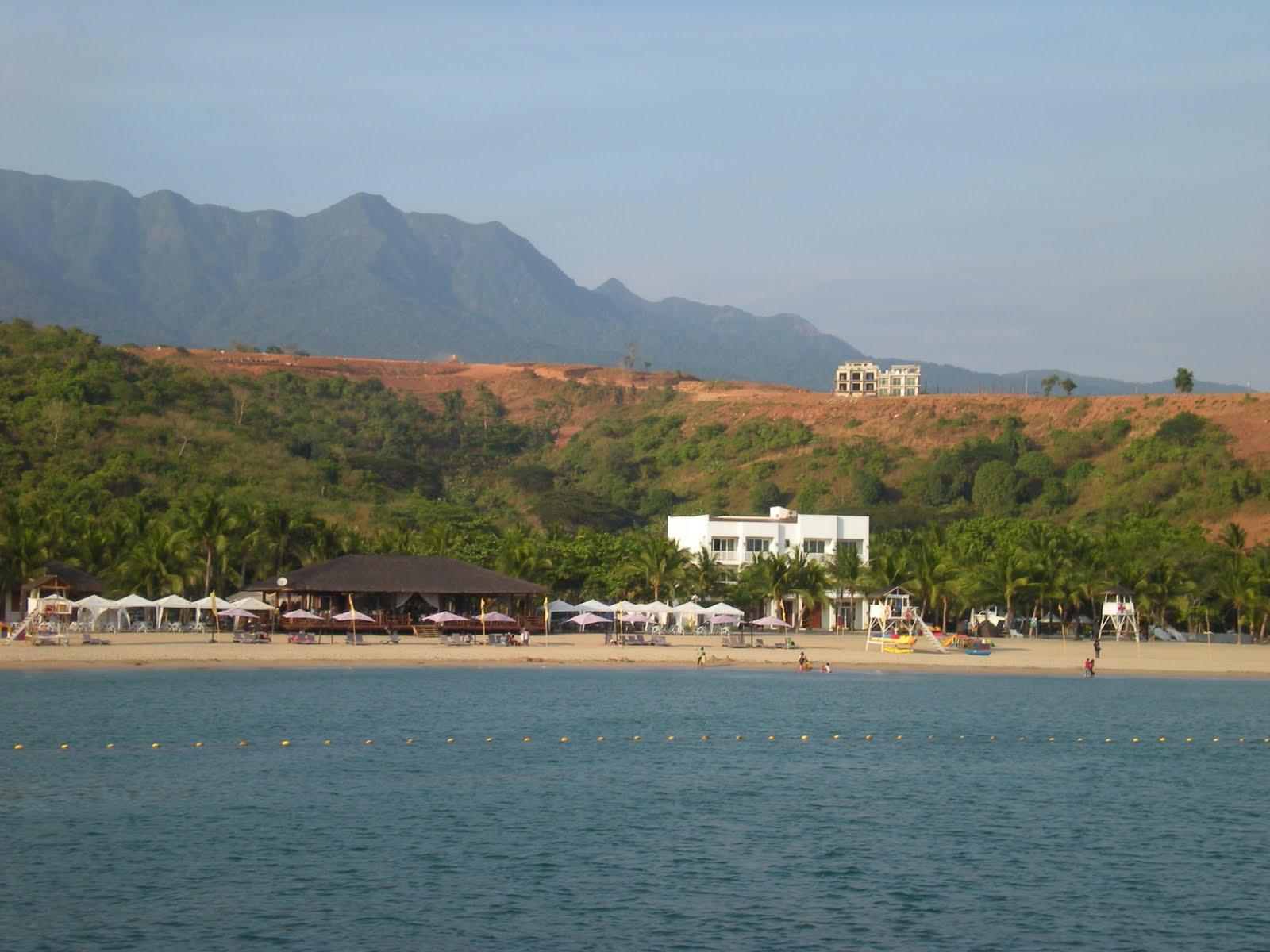
Camaya Coast in Mariveles

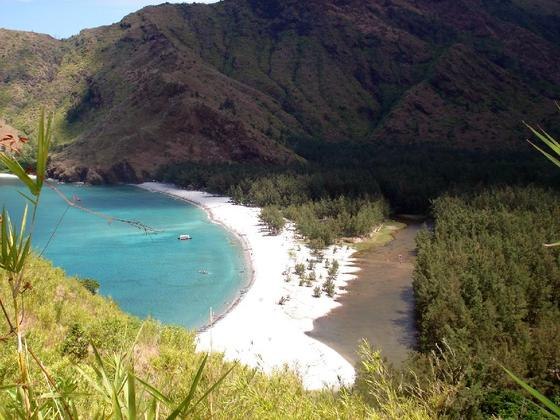
Annawangin Cove on Redondo Peninsula, Zambales

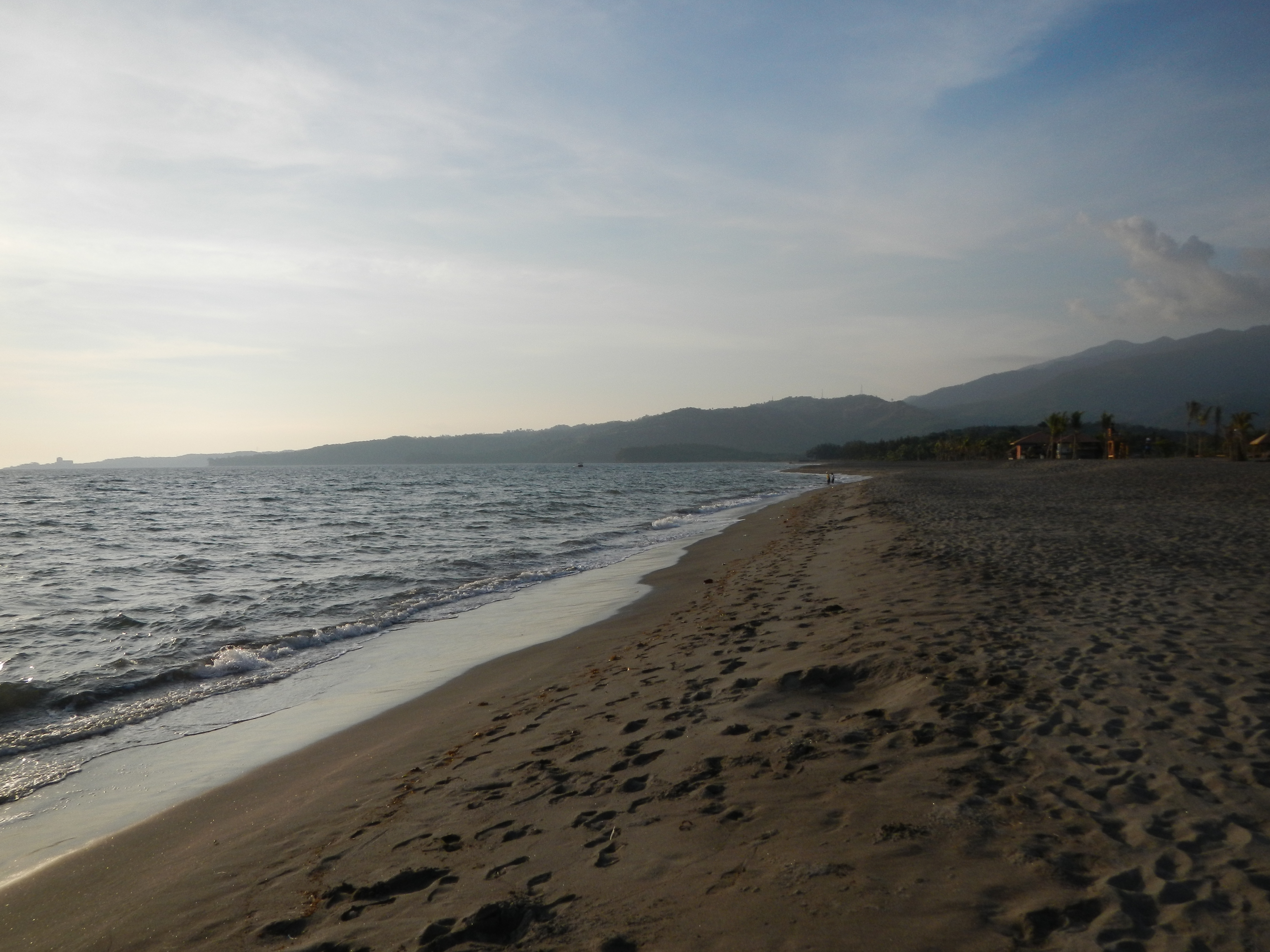
Bagac Bay in Bataan

- Agwawan Beach, Mariveles
- Anvaya Cove, Morong
- Barretto Beach, Subic
- Boardwalk Beach, Olongapo
- Camaya Coast (Wain Beach), Mariveles
- Camayan Beach, Morong
- Costa Vida Privada, Bagac
- Lusong Beach, Mariveles
- Mawakis Cove, Mariveles
- Montemar Beach, Bagac
- Nagbalayong Beach, Morong
- Playa La Caleta, Bagac
- Pundaquit Beach, San Antonio
- Quinawan Bay, Bagac
- Redondo Peninsula, San Antonio
- Sabang Beach, Morong
- Saysain Beach, Bagac
- West Nuk Cove, Morong
- Talaga Beach, Mariveles

== South mainland ==
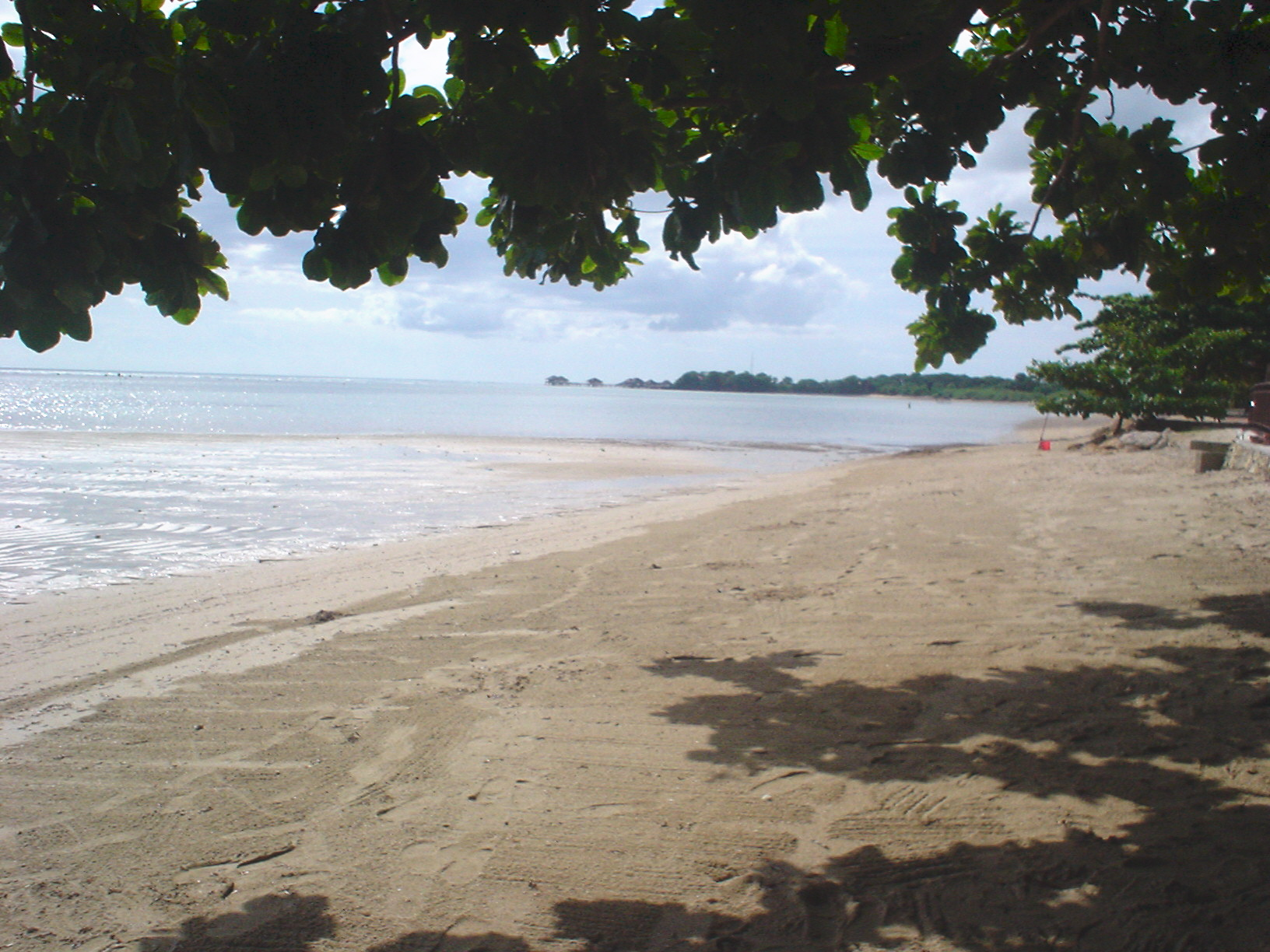
Beach in Calatagan

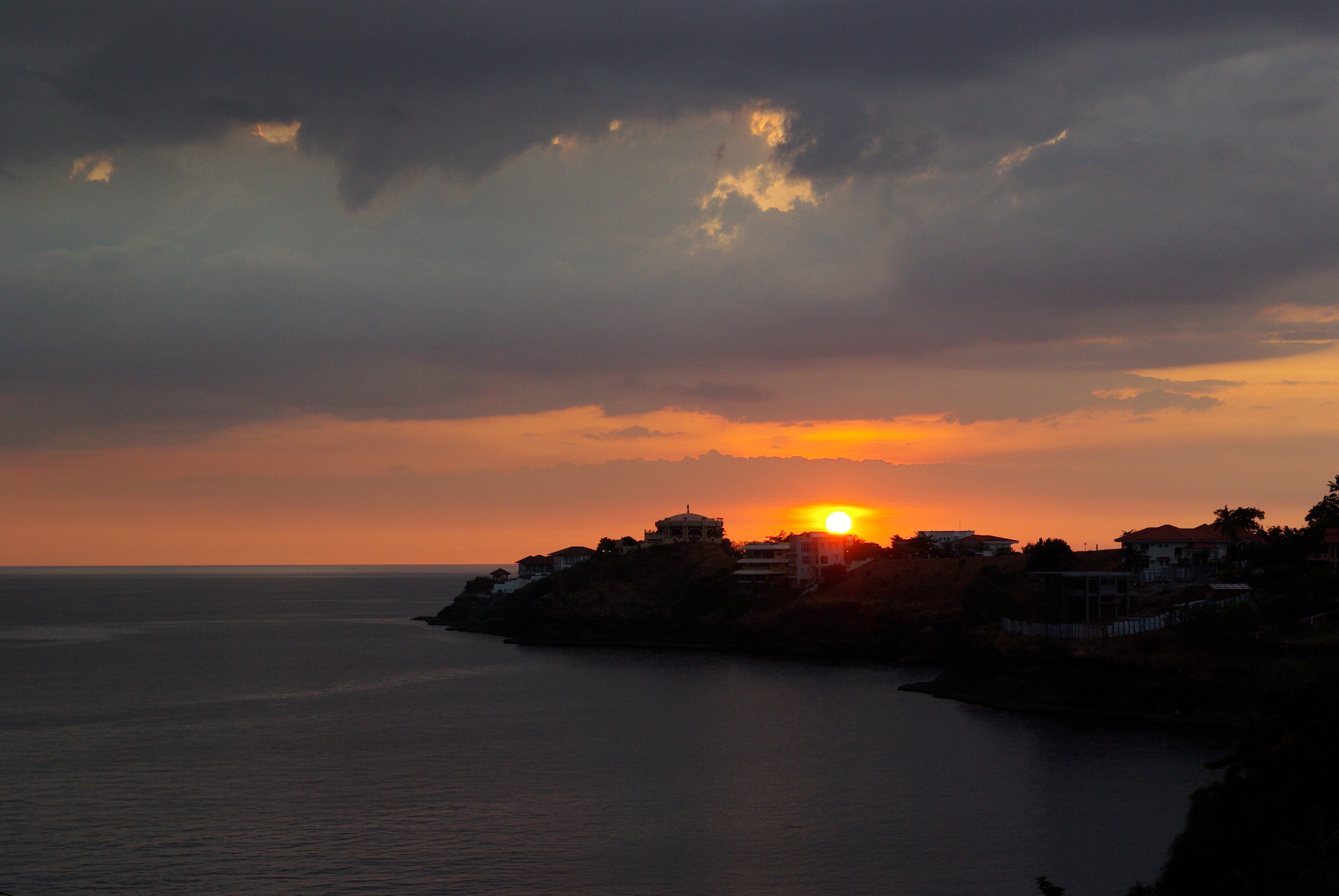
Punta Fuego in Nasugbu

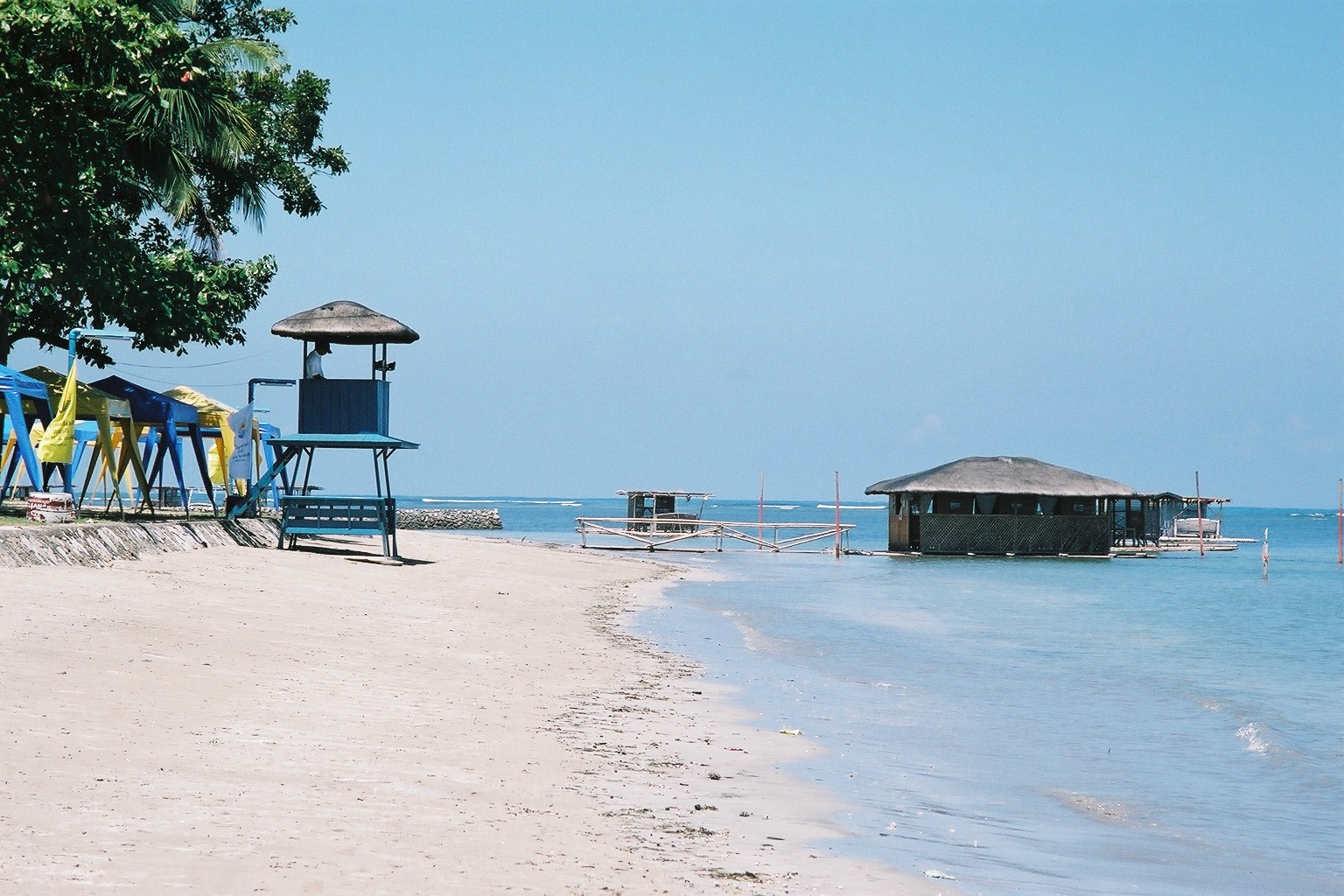
Matabungkay Beach in Lian

- Anilao Beach, Mabini
- Balibago Beach, Calatagan
- Calayo Beach, Nasugbu
- Calumpang Beach, Ternate
- Caylabne Cove, Ternate
- Gerthel Beach, Lobo
- Hamilo Coast, Nasugbu
- Hugon Beach, San Juan
- Laiya Beach, San Juan
- Lido Beach Resort, Noveleta
- Limbones Cove, Maragondon
- Mahabang Buhangin Beach, San Juan
- Malabrigo Beach, Lobo
- Matabungkay Beach, Lian
- Munting Buhangin Beach, Nasugbu
- Natipunan Beach, Nasugbu
- Pico de Loro Cove, Nasugbu
- Puerto Azul, Ternate
- Punta Fuego, Nasugbu
- Santa Ana Beach, Calatagan
- Santa Mercedes Beach, Maragondon
- Tali Beach, Nasugbu
- TIP Beach Resort and New Noveleta Cockpit Arena, Noveleta
- Villamar Beach Resorts I and II, Noveleta

== See also ==
- List of islands in the Greater Manila Area
- List of beaches in the Philippines
