= Capones Island Lighthouse =

Historic lighthouse in Zambales, Philippines

Capones Island lighthouse
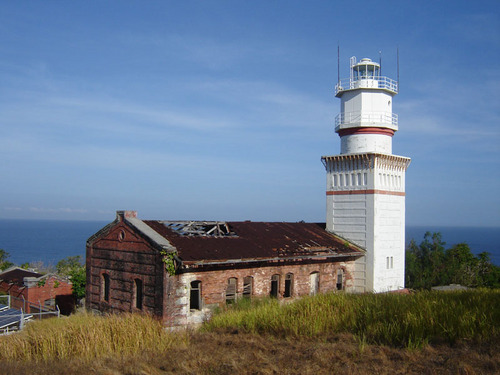
- Location: Capones Island, San Antonio, Zambales, Philippines
- Coordinates: 14°54′55.6″N 120°0′32.4″E

Tower
- Constructed: 1890
- Construction: brick masonry tower
- Height: 65.0 feet (19.8 m)
- Shape: square tower with doucle balcony and lantern
- Markings: white tower and lantern
- Heritage: Important Cultural Property

Light
- First lit: 1890
- Focal height: 230.0 feet (70.1 m)
- Lens: First-Order Fresnel lens
- Range: 25 nautical miles (46 km; 29 mi)
- Characteristic: Fl (3) W 15s.

Capones Island Lighthouse is a historic lighthouse located in Capones Island off the coast of Barangay Pundaquit, San Antonio, in the province of Zambales, in the Philippines. The light guides international vessels coming from the north to northwest towards Subic Bay or to Corregidor Island Lighthouse at the entrance of Manila Bay. It had first-order lenses when it was first lit on August 1, 1890.

The island is famous for the century-old Capones Lighthouse. Most visitors would leave Manila very early in the morning and would go straight to an island hopping tour of Capones Island and the nearby coves.

== Current condition ==
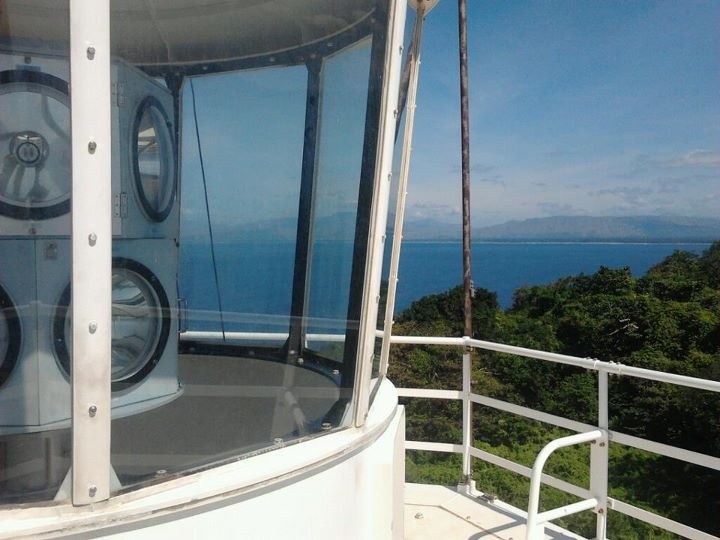
View from the lantern

The original lamp and lantern were replaced with a modern solar-powered lighthouse light as part of the Maritime Safety Improvement of the Philippine Coast Guard. Only the tower was renovated. The keeper's house and the other buildings in the station were left deteriorating.

== See also ==
- List of lighthouses in the Philippines
