= Corregidor Island Lighthouse =

Historic lighthouse in Cavite, Philippines

Corregidor Island lighthouse
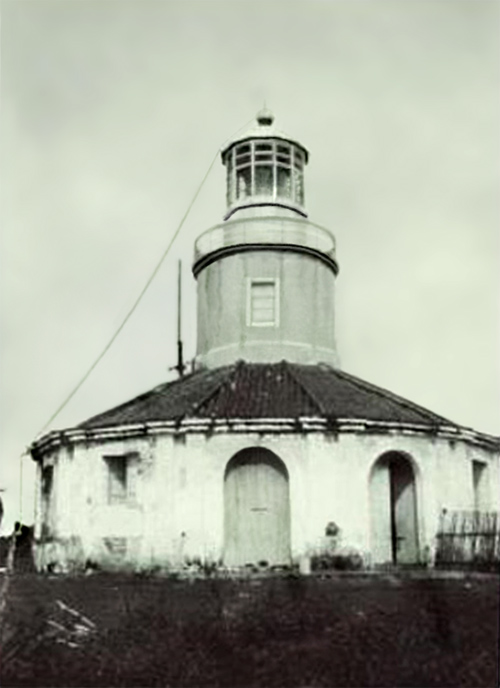
- Corregidor Lighthouse in 1893
- Location: Corregidor, Cavite, Philippines
- Coordinates: 14°22′48″N 120°34′37″E

Tower
- Constructed: 1853
- Construction: stone tower
- Height: 18 m (59 ft), 42 ft (13 m)
- Shape: cylindrical tower with double balcony and lantern
- Markings: white tower and lantern gray tower (1903) white tower (1920)

Light
- First lit: 1853
- Deactivated: 1942
- Focal height: 195 m (640 ft), 630 ft (190 m)
- Range: 1853: 20 miles (32 km); 1897: 33 miles (53 km)
- Characteristic: Fl W 10s or 20s. (1853); Al WR 10s.(1897)
- 1950 lighthouse
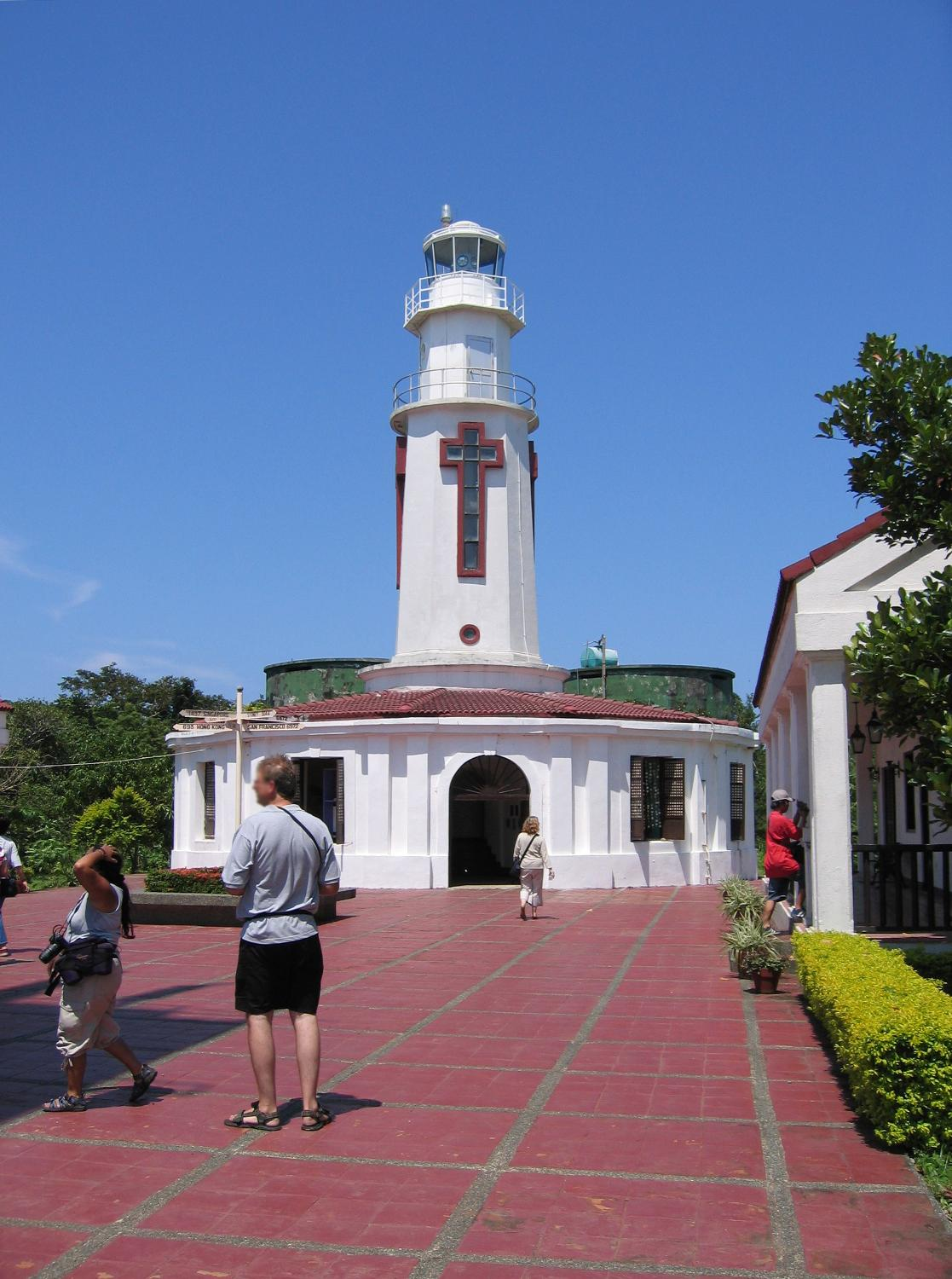
- Height: 48 ft (15 m)
- First lit: 1950
- Focal height: 633 ft (193 m)
- Lens: second order Fresnel lens
- Characteristic: Fl(3) W 20s

The first Corregidor Island Lighthouse was a historic lighthouse located on the island of Corregidor, in the province of Cavite, Philippines. The light station was one of the most important lights in the archipelago. It was established in 1853 to guide ships to the entrance of Manila Bay on their way to the port of Manila, the most important trading center in the country. This light occupies the converging point of two lines of approach for vessels from the China Sea which steer for the entrance of Manila Bay. Vessels from Hong Kong and the ports of China to the northwest first sight the Capones Island light off the southwest coast of Zambales. Vessels from ports of Indo-China first sight the Corregidor lights in the center. Vessels from Singapore, Indonesia, India, and all the ports of the Philippine Islands, to the south, first sight the Cabra Island light. All lines converge on Corregidor light at the bay entrance.

== Description ==
Corregidor, together with Caballo Island, divide the entrance of the bay into the North Channel and South Channel, also known as Boca Chica and Boca Grande, respectively in the Spanish era. The passage between the two islands is only 1/4 mile and is dangerous for large vessels.

The lighthouse was located on the highest point of the island (later known as the Topside) with an effective height of 639 feet (195 m) above sea level or 42-ft high from the base of the light tower. The total height of the tower measured 60.0 feet (18.3 m) from the base to the top of the wind vane. The light was obscured when well into the steep north side of the island.

The cylindrical tower was originally colored gray with octagonal keeper's dwelling surrounding the base. The roof of the base also doubles as rain collector for the cisterns next to the lighthouse, which provide water not for only the station but supplements the need of the island.

== History ==
=== Spanish Colonial Era ===
The two light stations, Corregidor and Caballo, were the second oldest lighthouses established in the country after the lighthouse at the mouth of the Pasig River.

The establishment of a lighthouse station on the island of Corregidor was recommended in the year 1835 during the administration of Governor Pascual Enrile y Alcedo. Its construction was not authorized, however, until 1846 with the passing of Royal Order of April 14 by the Spanish Government. The lighthouse was not completed until 1853 – eighteen years after the recommendation of its construction had been made.

On January 18, 1853, notice to mariners were released announcing the start of service on February 1, 1853, for the second-order light on Corregidor, together with the fourth-order light on Caballo Island. Both lighthouses were equipped with lighting apparatus from Henry Lepaute of Paris. The white light on the summit of Corregidor revolved once every ten or twenty seconds, and visible in clear weather from a distance of 20 miles. Later, a fixed white light was also shown from the white tower on the West Mole Head, at the entrance to the bay on the north side of the island.

In 1897, the aging lighting apparatus was replaced by a provisional light of the same character, but of less power, before the installation of a new permanent light that was exhibited on August 1, 1897. The new apparatus flashed white and red light, showing white and red flashes alternately every ten seconds, separated by total eclipses, and is visible 36 miles in clear weather.

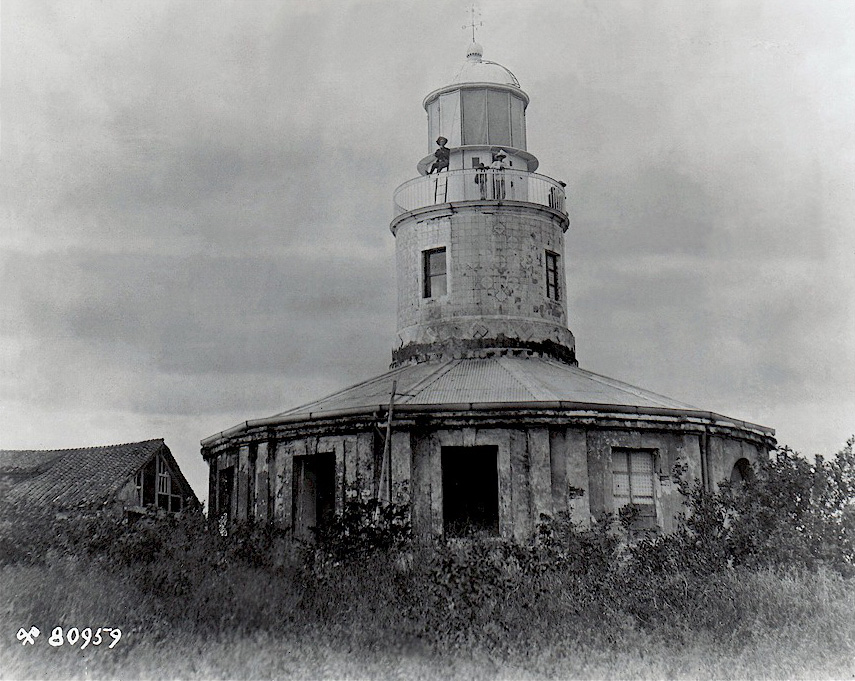
The lighthouse in 1899 during the Philippine–American War

=== American Colonial Period ===
When the Americans took control of the country, the newly established Bureau of Coast Guard and Coast Guard made a complete tour of the country, inspecting all lighthouses and stations in the archipelago in 1902. All the lighthouses were found urgently needing repairs to preserve their good condition, to make the stations efficient and habitable. In Corregidor, repairs were done to rehabilitate the dwellings and tower, and a bamboo fence was erected.

The main construction works in 1903 were renovating the old buildings, and the construction of new quarters for the light station. A school of apprentices was established in Manila the previous year to train competent lighthouse keepers, using Corregidor lighthouse as a training station. Three frame buildings for quarters and kitchens were erected.

The year after, a small party was sent to this station to make more minor repairs to doors, windows, and drains, part of the appropriation from Acts 807 and 1049.

In 1905, the bamboo fence at Corregidor light station being found in bad condition and was replaced with posts and boards. The system of gutters was changed to increase the water supply. A latrine was built, new floors were put in the keepers' dwellings as they were damaged by termites.

With funds from the approval of Act No. 1225 for lighthouse maintenance, some were applied to the purchase of the necessary parts from Paris to convert the polygonal lantern at Corregidor into a cylindrical lantern to diminish the interval between flashes from ten to five seconds and to replace the wick burner with the incandescent system.

In 1908, the Corregidor Island became a U.S. military installation and was designated as Fort Mills as part of the harbor defense of Manila Bay. The Americans started fortifying the island as main naval defense fort for the bay in case of war.

=== World War II ===
On December 8, 1941, the day the Japanese invaded the Philippines, the lighthouses on Corregidor, Caballo, and Monja Island were extinguished as agreed by the Navy and the Harbor Defense Commander.

From December 16, Corregidor lighthouse was used by the Navy to facilitate the entrance of submarines carrying supplies and ammunition for the troops on the island as authorized by General Douglas MacArthur. The light was shown the first ten minutes of each one-half hour on a secret schedule furnished by the Navy for each entry. Only white light was shown and on a fixed specified azimuth. As the submarine passes through the controlled mine fields, the Inshore Patrol coordinating with the Harbor Defense put the mines on "safe" and the marking buoys were illuminated by searchlights.

The first damage to the lighthouse happened on January 14 around noon when two flights of bombers, nine each, bombed mostly the Topside. The lighthouse and surrounding buildings were damaged but the light was still operable using a kerosene lamp.

During the fight for liberation from the Japanese, the island was heavily bombed leaving every building in the island in ruins. The lighthouse did not survive the bombardment.

== The lighthouse today ==
Around the 1950s, the lighthouse was rebuilt using some of the original stones from the ruins but using a different design. The base now houses a souvenir shop for tourists of the historical island.

The lantern was replaced in the 1990s with a solar-powered light as part of the Maritime Safety Improvement Project by the Philippine Coast Guard.

== See also ==
- List of lighthouses in the Philippines
