= Redondo Peninsula =

Mountainous region of southwest Zambales, Philippines

Coordinates: 14.5018°N 120.1057°E

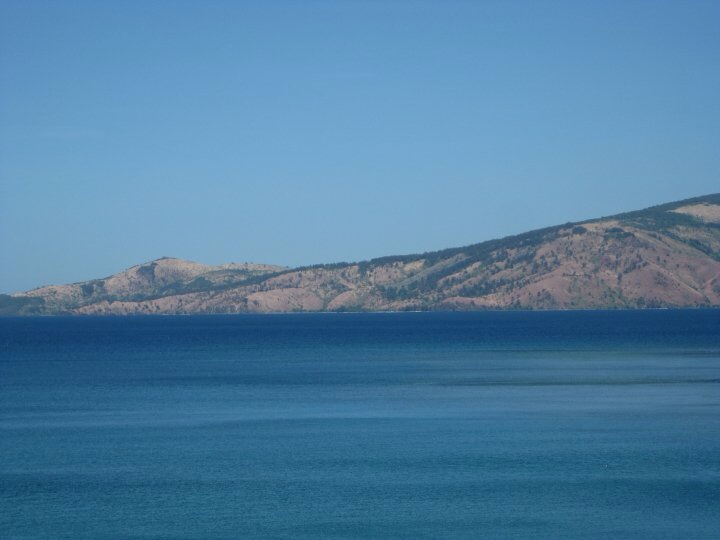
Redondo Peninsula viewed from Morong, Bataan

The Redondo Peninsula is a short mountainous peninsula extending about 15 kilometers (9 miles) to the south of Zambales on western Luzon in the Philippines. It separates Subic Bay and the coasts around the Subic Bay Metropolitan Area of Subic and Olongapo from the South China Sea. It is known for its secluded coves, beaches and pine-forested mountains.

== Geography ==
The peninsula is administratively divided between two municipalities of Zambales: San Antonio (west) and Subic (east). The west coast of the peninsula is indented by several coves and bays, namely Silanguin Bay, Nazasa Cove (also known as Nagsasa Cove), Talisain Bay, Agnaem Bay and Calaguaguin Cove (also known as Anawangin Cove). The eastern coast on Subic Bay consists of long stretches of beach as well as the Subic Shipyard of Hanjin Philippines located near the southern tip at Barangay Cawag, Subic. Nearby islands include Capones Island, Tabones Island, Silanguin Island and Los Frailes Islands on the west coast; and Subic Grande Island, Subic Chiquita Island, Mayanga Island and Pequeña Island on Subic Bay. Mount Silanguin is the highest peak on the peninsula at 2,160 ft. (658 m.). Other notable peaks include Mount Redondo, Cinco Picos, Mount Nazasa and Rounded Peak.

The entire peninsula is now administered by the Subic Bay Metropolitan Authority (SBMA) as part of Subic Bay Freeport Zone with the recent turnover of the San Antonio Economic Development Area covering the sitios of Silangin, Nagsasa and Talisayin on the peninsula to the SBMA in 2013.

== Subic Power Plant Project ==
In 2007, Redondo Peninsula Energy, Inc. secured a government deal to build a coal-fired power plant on the peninsula. This coal power project, a joint venture between Aboitiz Power Corp. and Taiwan's Cogeneration Corp. is one of several energy projects aimed at addressing the projected power supply shortage on the main island of Luzon by 2016. Opposition to the project from local residents, environmentalist groups and local government units in Zambales was strong prompting the Supreme Court to issue a Writ of Kalikasan in 2012. This project is stalled as of June 2014. The consortium dropped the development of the coal plant in 2021, citing a shift to a possible gas project in the area.

== See also ==
- Luzon tropical pine forests
