= Capones Island =

Island in the Philippines

Native name: Isla de Capon Grande
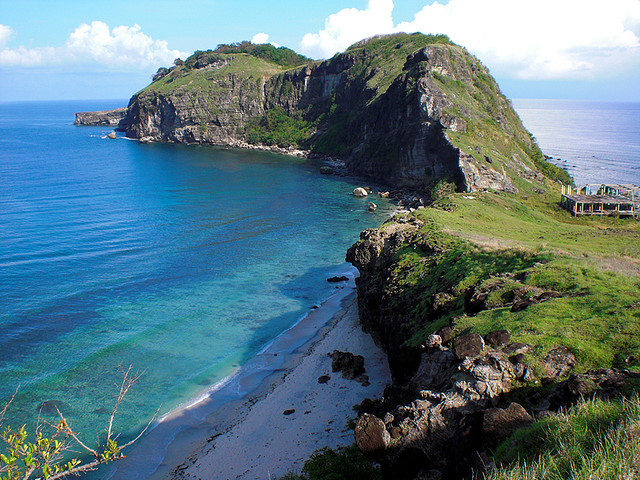

- Location within Philippines

Geography
- Location: 3.8 kilometers (2.4 mi) off the coast of Zambales mainland
- Coordinates: 14°54′57″N 120°0′53″E
- Adjacent to: South China Sea

Administration
- Philippines
- Region: Central Luzon
- Province: Zambales
- Municipality: San Antonio

Capones Island, also known as Grand Capon or Capon Grande Island (Spanish: Isla de Capon Grande) is a small island approximately 1.9 kilometers (1.2 mi) long by 0.4 kilometers (0.25 mi) wide, at its widest point, lying some 3.8 kilometers (2.4 mi) off the coast of the province of Zambales on western Luzon island in the Philippines. It is the largest of the Capones Islands (Islotes de los Capones), a group of three small islands which also includes nearby Camara Island and another islet connected to it by a sand bar. The island is administratively part of barangay Pundaquit of the Zambales municipality of San Antonio.

The island is characterized by huge rock formations and steep cliffs surrounded by white sand and coral beaches. The Capones Island Lighthouse is located on the hillside near the western end of the island.

== Proposed marine park ==
The marine areas surrounding Capones Island as well as portions of the adjacent coastline of barangays Pundaquit and San Miguel rich in fish and coral reefs currently has no special protection. The decline in fish catch brought about by the Mount Pinatubo eruption in 1991 and continued siltation problems as well as illegal fishing practices in the area prompted the Environmental Protection of Asia Foundation to submit a proposal to the Department of Environment and Natural Resources in 2003 for its conversion into a marine protected area called Capones Island Marine Park in coordination with the local government unit of San Antonio. It is also the aim of the program to provide alternative sources of livelihood to local fishermen, such as tourism.

== See also ==
- List of islands of the Philippines
