= San Antonio, Zambales =

Municipality in Zambales, Philippines

San Antonio Curillapa
- Municipality
- Municipality of San Antonio
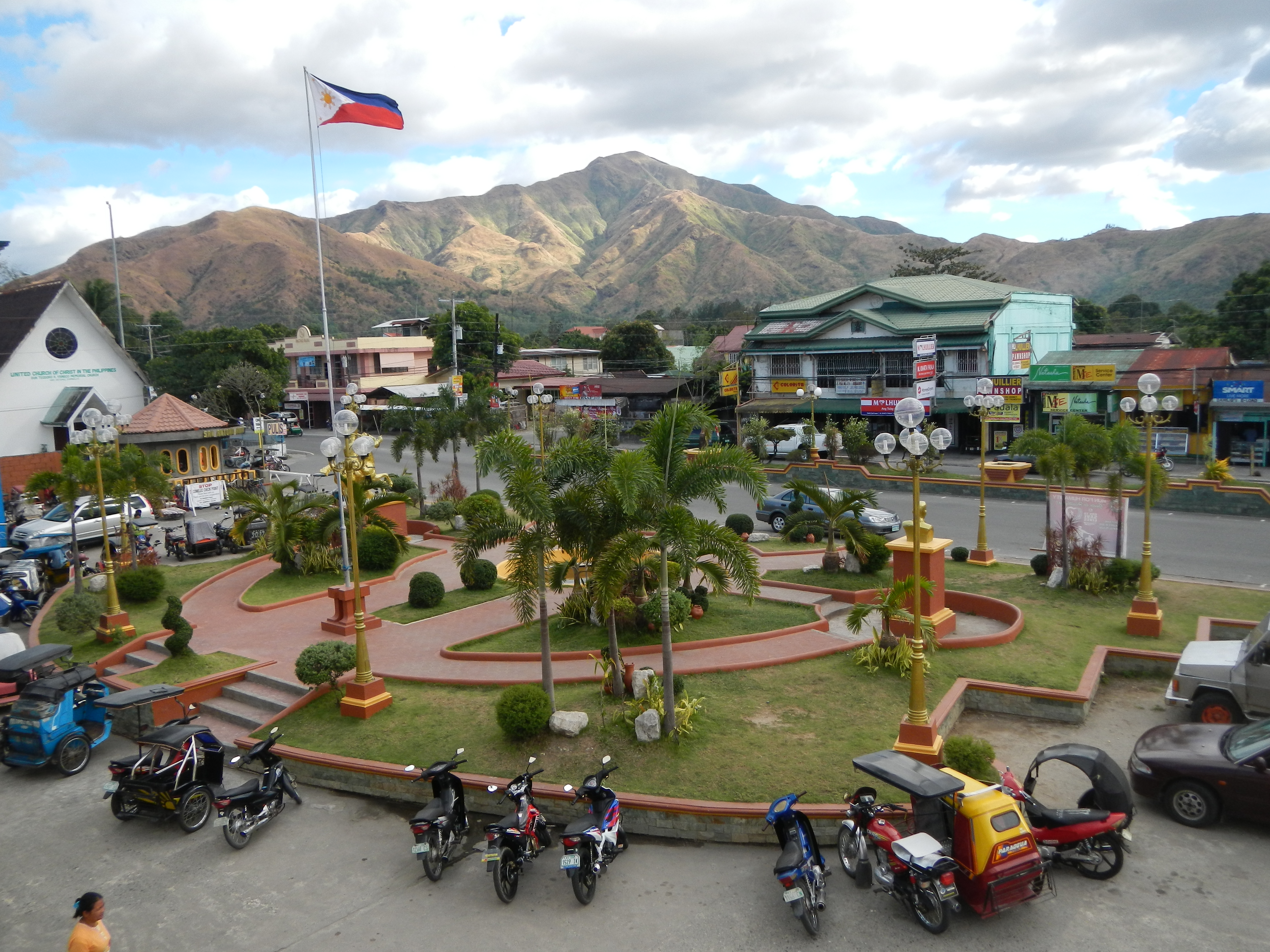
- Municipal Plaza with Redondo Mountains in the background

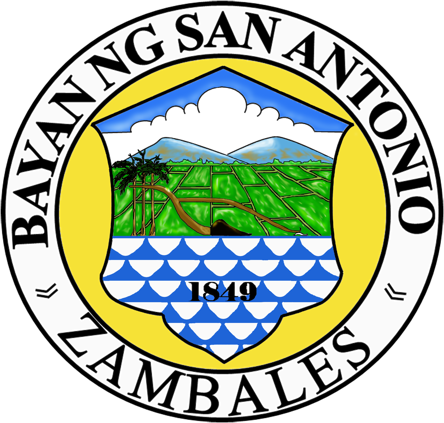
- Seal

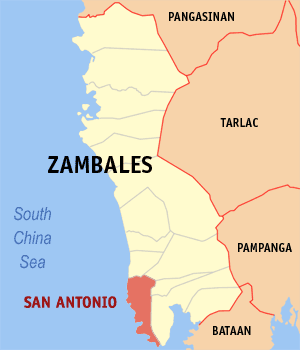
- Map of Zambales with San Antonio highlighted
- Interactive map of San Antonio
- Location within the Philippines
- Coordinates: 14°56′55″N 120°05′11″E
- Country: Philippines
- Region: Central Luzon
- Province: Zambales
- District: 2nd district
- Founded: 1849
- Named for: St. Anthony of Padua
- Barangays: 14 (see Barangays)

Government
  - Type: Sangguniang Bayan
  - Mayor: Dok Arvin Antipolo
  - Vice Mayor: Atty. Joseph Jonathan A. Bactad
  - Representative: Doris "Nanay Bing" Maniquiz
  - Municipal Council: Members: Juanito P. Dimaculangan; Joseph Jonathan A. Bactad; Arvin Rolly D. Antipolo; Imelda B. Aratea; Jovy A. Arlantico; Irwin E. Mata; Nilfredo Q. Fabros; Elizabeth F. Ablog
  - Electorate: 24,236 voters (2025)

Area
  - Total: 188.12 km^{2} (72.63 sq mi)
- Elevation: 64 m (210 ft)
- Highest elevation: 954 m (3,130 ft)
- Lowest elevation: 0 m (0 ft)

Population (2024 census)
  - Total: 38,617
  - Density: 205.28/km^{2} (531.67/sq mi)
  - Households: 9,855

Economy
  - Income class: 1st municipal income class
  - Poverty incidence: 13.3% (2023)
  - Revenue: ₱ 256 million (2024)
  - Assets: ₱ 841.9 million (2024)
  - Expenditure: ₱ 265.9 million (2024)
  - Liabilities: ₱ 308.3 million (2024)

Service provider
  - Electricity: Zambales 2 Electric Cooperative (ZAMECO 2)
- Time zone: UTC+8 (PST)
- ZIP code: 2206
- PSGC: 0307109000
- IDD : area code: +63 (0)47
- Native languages: Ilocano; Tagalog; Sambal

San Antonio (/ˌsæn ænˈtoʊnioʊ/ SAN an-TOH-nee-oh; Spanish for "Saint Anthony"), officially the Municipality of San Antonio (Ilocano: Ili ti San Antonio; Tagalog: Bayan ng San Antonio; Sambal: Babali nin San Antonio), is a municipality in the province of Zambales, Philippines. According to the 2024 census, it has a population of 38,617 people.

== History ==
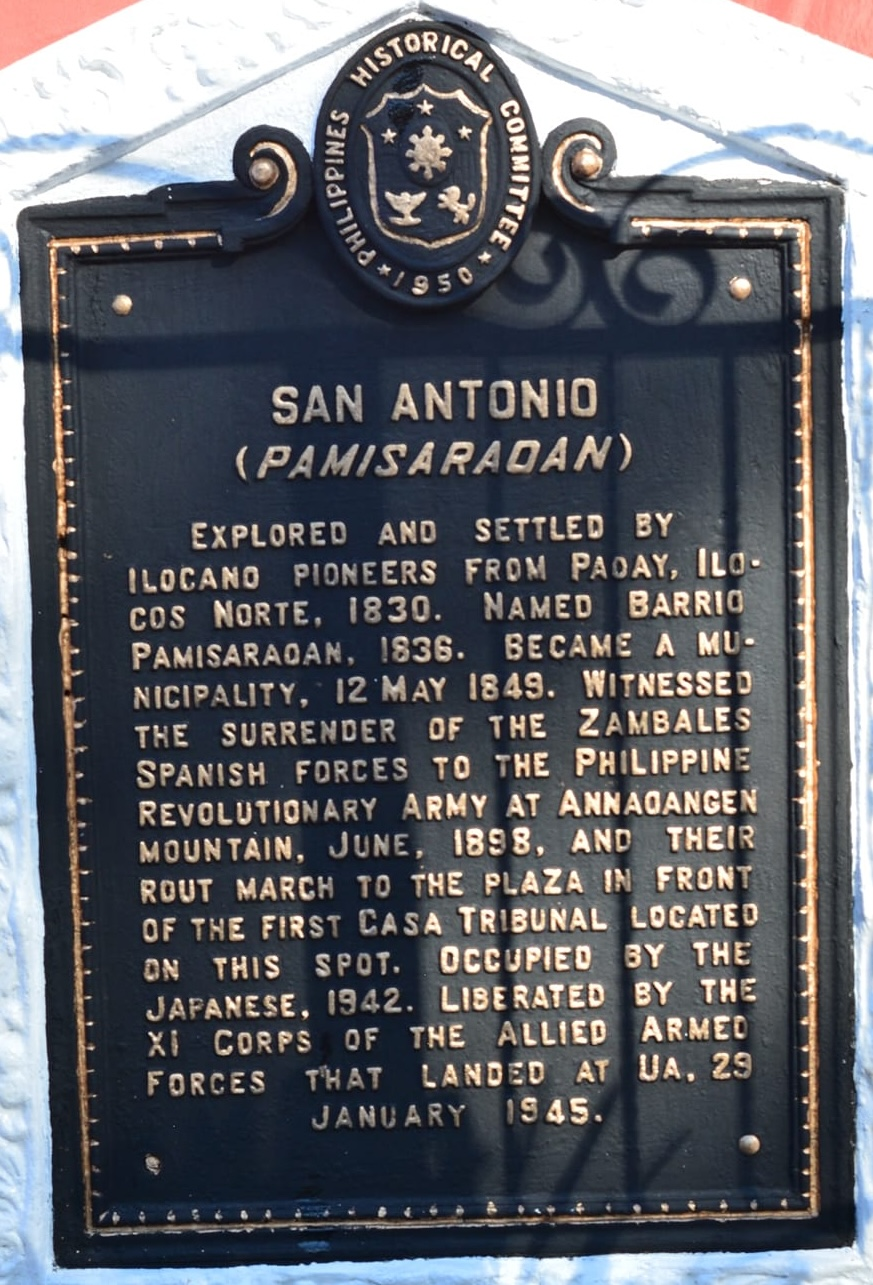
PHC historical marker installed in 1950 at the central elementary school

San Antonio was a hunting region where indigenous hunters from the northern towns of Zambales would hunt, and gather. The first settlers from the Paoay area in Ilocos Norte arrived in 1830, and founded the first Spanish settlement that developed into what is now San Antonio.

San Antonio was given the status of district or barrio in 1836. The town mayor in that period was Don Gregorio Banaga. He governed the town from 1836 to 1849. He was succeeded by Don Vicente Lacuesta in 1849, from Teniente Primero to Teniente Absoluto. The last mayor was Don Santiago Ladrillono. He was succeeded by Don Dimas Pascasio as governor in 1856. They selected their leaders every year. In 1891 to 1898, Don Pablo Corpus was the only Capitan Municipal selected then appointed Don Felix Magsaysay as the first President municipal, and many more followed up to 1931 to 1945.

The town was the site of the United States Navy Base known as the U.S. Naval Communications Station San Miguel. After the earthquake and eruption of Mount Pinatubo in 1991, the United States Military decided to abandon its military bases in the Philippines.

== Geography ==
San Antonio is 48 kilometres (30 mi) from Iba and 167 kilometres (104 mi) from Manila, and between San Narciso and San Marcelino on the Olongapo–Bugallon Road.

=== Barangays ===
San Antonio is politically subdivided into 14 barangays, as indicated below. Each barangay consists of puroks and some have sitios.

- Angeles
- Antipolo
- Burgos (Poblacion)
- East Dirita
- Luna (Poblacion)
- Pundaquit
- Rizal (Poblacion) (Sentro Pueblo)
- San Esteban
- San Gregorio (Poblacion)
- San Juan (Poblacion) (Sitio Mabanban)
- San Miguel
- San Nicolas (Poblacion)
- Santiago (Poblacion) (Pamatawan)
- West Dirita

=== Climate ===
Climate data for San Antonio, Zambales
Month	Jan	Feb	Mar	Apr	May	Jun	Jul	Aug	Sep	Oct	Nov	Dec	Year
Mean daily maximum °C (°F)	30 (86)	31 (88)	33 (91)	34 (93)	33 (91)	31 (88)	29 (84)	29 (84)	29 (84)	30 (86)	31 (88)	30 (86)	31 (87)
Mean daily minimum °C (°F)	19 (66)	20 (68)	21 (70)	23 (73)	25 (77)	25 (77)	25 (77)	25 (77)	24 (75)	23 (73)	22 (72)	20 (68)	23 (73)
Average precipitation mm (inches)	8 (0.3)	9 (0.4)	15 (0.6)	34 (1.3)	138 (5.4)	203 (8.0)	242 (9.5)	233 (9.2)	201 (7.9)	126 (5.0)	50 (2.0)	21 (0.8)	1,280 (50.4)
Average rainy days	3.7	4.1	6.5	11.2	21.2	24.9	27.7	26.5	25.5	21.8	12.6	5.6	191.3
Source: Meteoblue

== Demographics ==
Population census of San Antonio
Year	Pop.	±% p.a.
1903	4,524	—
1918	6,045	+1.95%
1939	6,637	+0.45%
1948	8,381	+2.63%
1960	11,596	+2.74%
1970	18,048	+4.52%
1975	21,099	+3.18%
1980	22,382	+1.19%
1990	26,944	+1.87%
1995	25,765	−0.83%
2000	28,248	+1.99%
2007	32,494	+1.95%
2010	34,217	+1.90%
2015	34,661	+0.25%
2020	37,450	+1.64%
2024	38,617	+0.74%
Source: Philippine Statistics Authority

In the 2024 census, the population of San Antonio was 38,617 people, with a density of 210 inhabitants per square kilometre or 540 inhabitants per square mile.

== Economy ==
Poverty incidence of San Antonio (%)

Source: Philippine Statistics Authority

== Tourism ==
San Antonio is increasingly known for its beaches, mountains and coves, and is a destination for campers and beach goers.

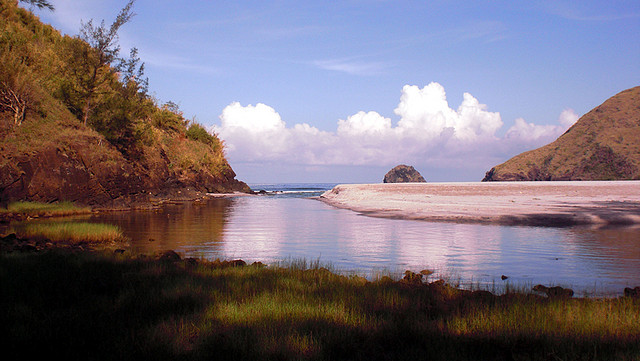
Anawangin Cove

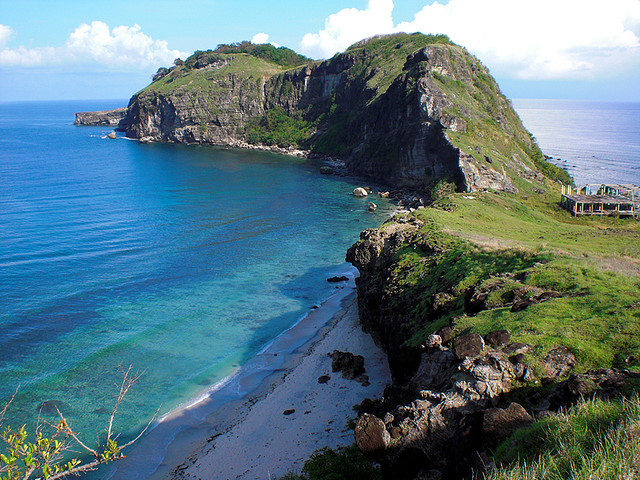
Capones Island

- Casa San Miguel: Founded by violinist Coke Bolipata, the community center provides its members the time and space for developing their interest and talent in classical music.
- Tiklados Applied Music Center (Tiklados): Located at Barangay Antipolo, it was founded by Dr. Ceferino Cariaso III in 2002, to tutor young pianists and guitarists. The center caters to the following instruments: piano, violin, guitar, organ, flute, and voice. Solfege and music theory are also offered in the center. At present, Tiklados has three piano rooms, one violin/voice room, a spacious faculty and staff lounge, and a 60-seater concert hall.
- Pundaquit: Nestled in the navel of the Zambales coastline, a Spanish Light House from the 1800s is found atop the "Islas de Punta Capones." This is reminiscent of places such as "Sierra Leone."
- Redondo Peninsula: A short mountainous peninsula extending about 15 kilometers (9 miles) to the south of Zambales on western Luzon in the Philippines. It separates Subic Bay and the coasts around the Subic Bay Metropolitan Area of Subic and Olongapo from the South China Sea. It is known for its secluded coves, beaches and pine-forested mountains.
- Anawangin Cove: It is a crescent shaped cove with agoho trees, a species native to the Philippines, some Southeast Asian countries and north-eastern parts of Australia.
- Nagsasa Cove
- Talisayin Cove
- Silangen Cove
- Capones Island
- Camara Island

== Education ==
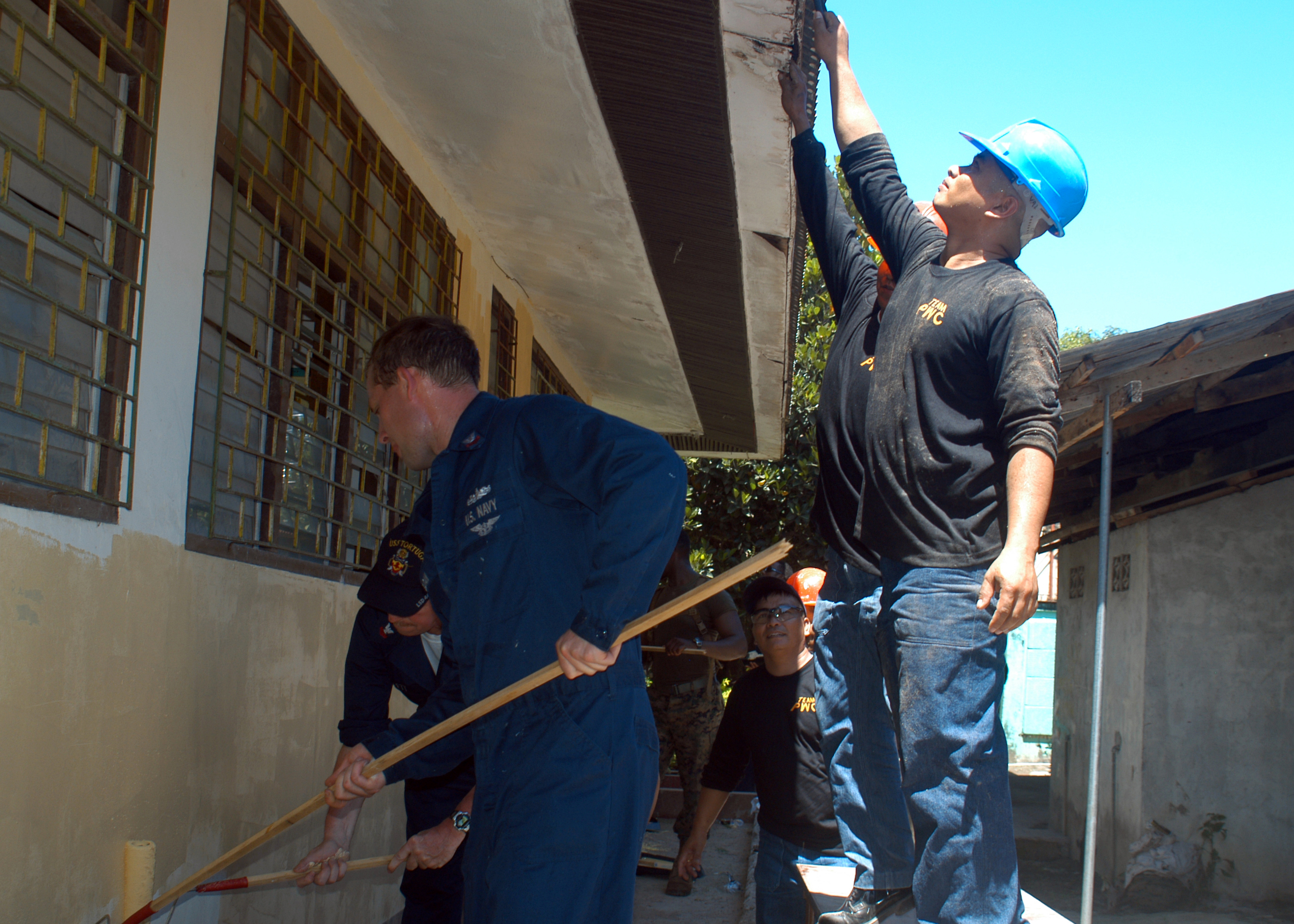
Military personnel paint and repair the West Dirita Elementary School in San Antonio during a community service project.

The San Antonio Schools District Office governs all educational institutions within the municipality. It oversees the management and operations of all private and public, from primary to secondary schools.

=== Primary and elementary schools ===
- Academica De Meridien
- Angel C. Manglicmot Memorial Elementary School
- Escuela Royal de Maria Montessori
- Hildegarde Von Bingen Academy
- Little Voices Christian Elementary Academy
- East Dirita Integrated School
- Pundakit Elementary School
- San Antonio Central Elementary School
- San Esteban Elementary School
- San Gregorio Elementary School
- San Juan Elementary School
- San Miguel Elementary School
- San Nicolas Elementary School
- Soth Center for Music, Arts and Sports
- Teodoro R. Yangco Memorial Elementary School
- West Dirita Elementary School

=== Secondary schools ===
- San Antonio National High School
- Dalmacio-Pablo Carpio National High School
- Angeles National High School
- Pundakit High School
- East Dirita Integrated School
- Teodoro R. Yangco Catholic Educational Institute
- Luzon Technical Institute
- College of Hildegarde Von Bingen
- Valiant Educational Institute
- Soth Center for Music, Arts and Sports

== Sports ==
San Antonio, influenced by the presence of the United States Naval Communication Station in the late '50s, is the baseball and softball capital of Zambales. Mayor Zozimo Pascasio and the Holy Name Society adopted the program in the '60s and '70s. Their partnership produced players who became athletic scholars in various colleges and universities in Manila. In the early '80s, JJ Henry & Chuck Jones of FRA Branch 367 (US Navy retirees) living in San Antonio, further enhanced the enthusiasm for the sport through the Shipmates, a team of 10- to 12-year-old boys coming from the different barangays who competed in the PABA (Philippine Amateur Baseball Association) Invitational. In 1985, the core of the team intact & playing for TR Yangco Educational Institute, the Shipmates coached by Butch Echiverre, won the baseball gold in the CLRAA (Central Luzon Regional Athletic Association), a first for Zambales. The San Antonio "TNT" Jaycees, most of whom are employees at the US Navy base, continued the program with their annual San Antonio Summer Baseball Cup successfully.

After the eruption of Mt Pinatubo in 1991, due to the destruction of the playing fields and the withdrawal of the US bases, support for the baseball program dwindled. Eager to find an alternative sports activity, Butch Echiverre and some friends introduced darts to the community. From its humble beginnings at a place called "Kubo," presently, the Zambales Darters Federation is considered as one of the best dart organizations in the country for having hosted several national competitions. Its "no-school, no-play" policy is now adopted nationwide and the NDFP (National Darts Federation of the Philippines) conferred the President's Award to the group during the Darterong Pinoy 2012.

The community's love for baseball was rekindled in the late '90s after losing the provincial baseball crown to Botolan, Zambales. The SADTEA (San Antonio District Teachers & Employees Association) took the initiative of organizing an inter-school tournament. This time, a softball tournament for girls is included. Supported by some officials of the local government and equipment donated by San Antonians locally & abroad, San Antonio baseball/softball is better than it ever was. As a member of the Little League Asia Pacific Region, San Antonio has always reached the quarterfinals of the Philippine Series. Irwin Mata is the Little League President of San Antonio.

Aside from fast becoming a surfing capital of Luzon, San Antonio has an 18-hole golf course at the Naval Education and Training Command of the Philippine Navy (formerly US Naval Communication Station).

== Notable personalities ==
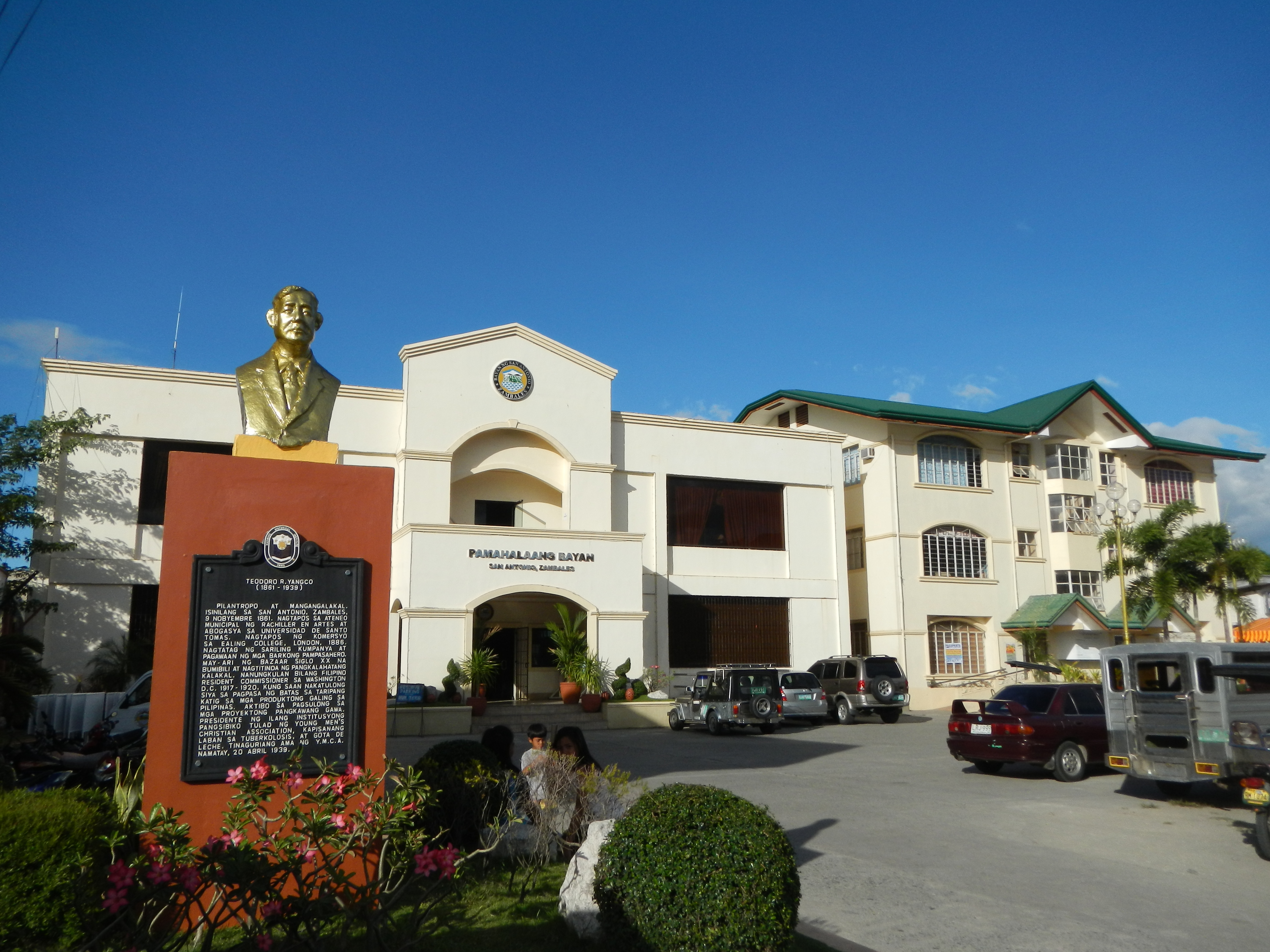
Monument to Teodoro Yangco in front of San Antonio municipal hall

- Teodoro R. Yangco, philanthropist and business magnate
- Guillermo Pablo, Associate Justice of the Supreme Court of the Philippines from 1945 to 1955
