= Cape Bojeador Lighthouse =

Historic lighthouse in Ilocos Norte, Philippines

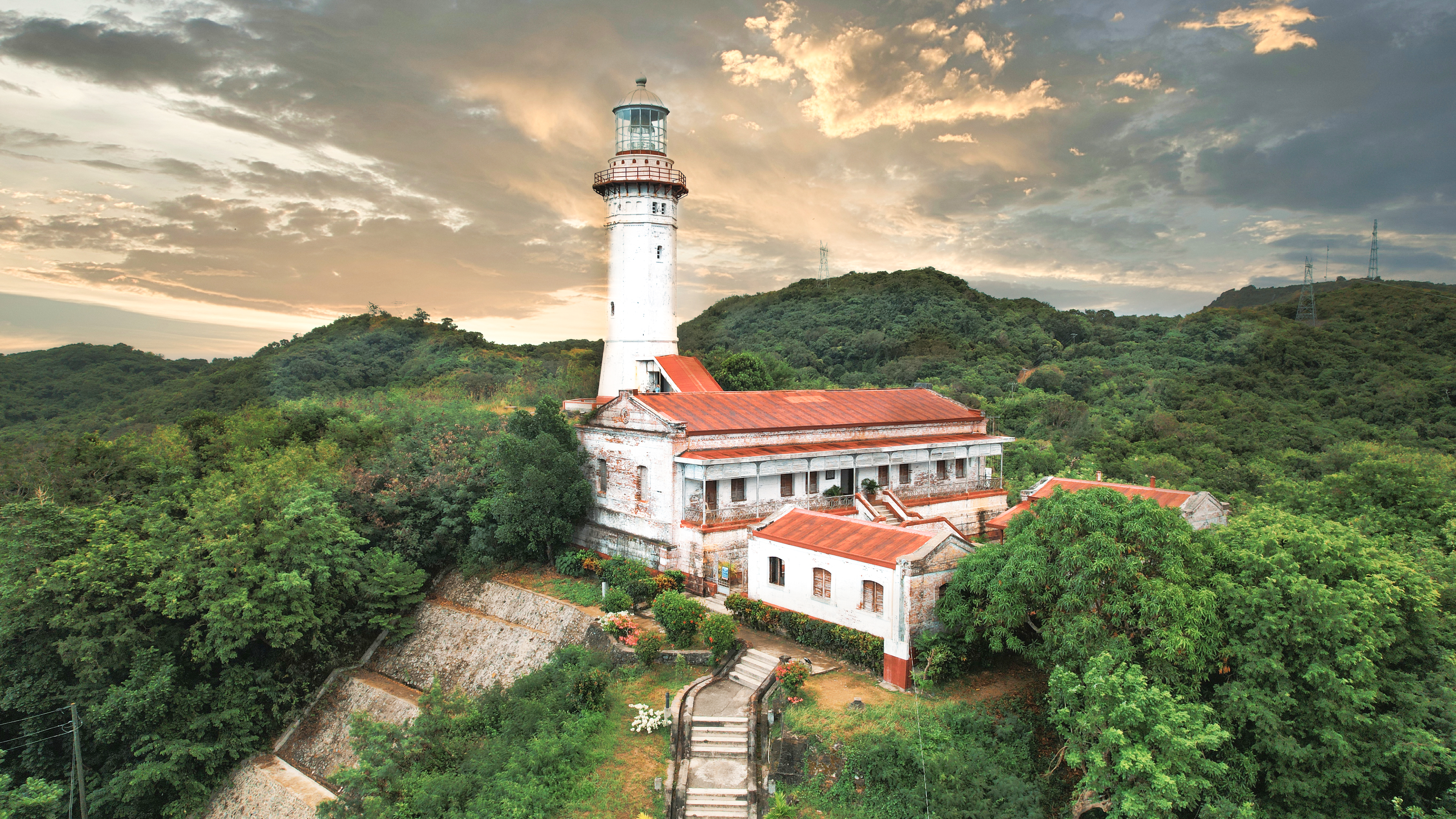
- The lighthouse in 2021
- Location: Burgos; Ilocos Norte; Philippines
- Coordinates: 18°30′44.3″N 120°35′52.6″E

Tower
- Constructed: 1892
- Height: 20 metres (66 ft)
- Shape: Octagon
- Markings: White tower and lantern
- Heritage: National Cultural Treasure, National Historical Landmark
- Fog signal: none

Light
- First lit: 1892
- Focal height: 118 metres (387 ft)
- Lens: First-order Fresnel lens
- Range: 20 nmi (37 km; 23 mi)
- Characteristic: Fl (3) W 5s.

Cape Bojeador Lighthouse, also known as Burgos Lighthouse, is a cultural heritage structure in Burgos, Ilocos Norte, that was established during the Spanish colonial period in the Philippines. The lighthouse was first lit on March 30, 1892, and is set high on Vigia de Nagpartian Hill overlooking the scenic Cape Bojeador where early galleons used to sail by. After over 100 years, it still functions and serves ships that enter the Philippine archipelago from the north and guide them safely away from the rocky coast of the town.

The light marks the northwesternmost point in Luzon. The northeasternmost being Cape Engaño Lighthouse on Palaui Island, Santa Ana, Cagayan.

The 66-foot-tall (20 m) octagonal stone tower, the most prominent structure in the vicinity, can be seen from as far away as Pasuquin town in the south and Bangui on the east on a clear day. Contrary to popular belief, it is not the highest-elevated nor tallest lighthouse in the Philippines but the highest-elevated still original and active Spanish era lighthouse in the country. Corregidor Lighthouse is higher at over 600 feet (180 m), and among the Spanish colonial lighthouses, the tower of Cape Melville Lighthouse is the tallest at 90 feet (27 m). In Mindoro Strait, the recently erected modern tower at the Apo Reef Light Station rises to a height of 110 feet (34 m).

== History ==
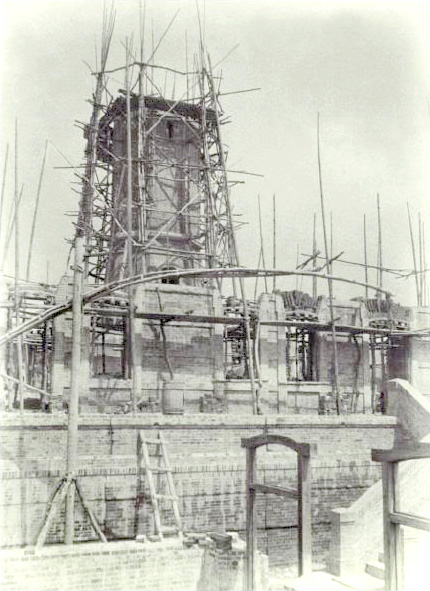
Cape Bojeador Lighthouse during construction in the 1890s

The Cape Bojeador lighthouse was part of the Spanish government's 1857 master plan of illuminating the Philippine archipelago, Plan General de Alumbrado de Maritimo de las costas del Archipelago de Filipino, administered by Inteligencia del Cuerpo de Ingenieros de Caminos, Canales y Puertos. The project commenced with the execution of the lighthouses in the northern and western part of the Philippines and those around Iloilo and Cebu. The 16.3 m tall Faro de Cabo Bojeador was first lit on March 30, 1892.

== Design ==
The lighthouse was first designed by Magin Pers y Perswho in 1887 and was finished by the Lighthouse Service under Guillermo Brockman. Its design is typical of Spanish colonial lighthouses in the Philippines, being of masonry made with bricks widely used and produced in the area. The octagonal tower is topped with a bronze cupola, and the viewing gallery is surrounded by decorative iron grill works.

== Lighting apparatus ==
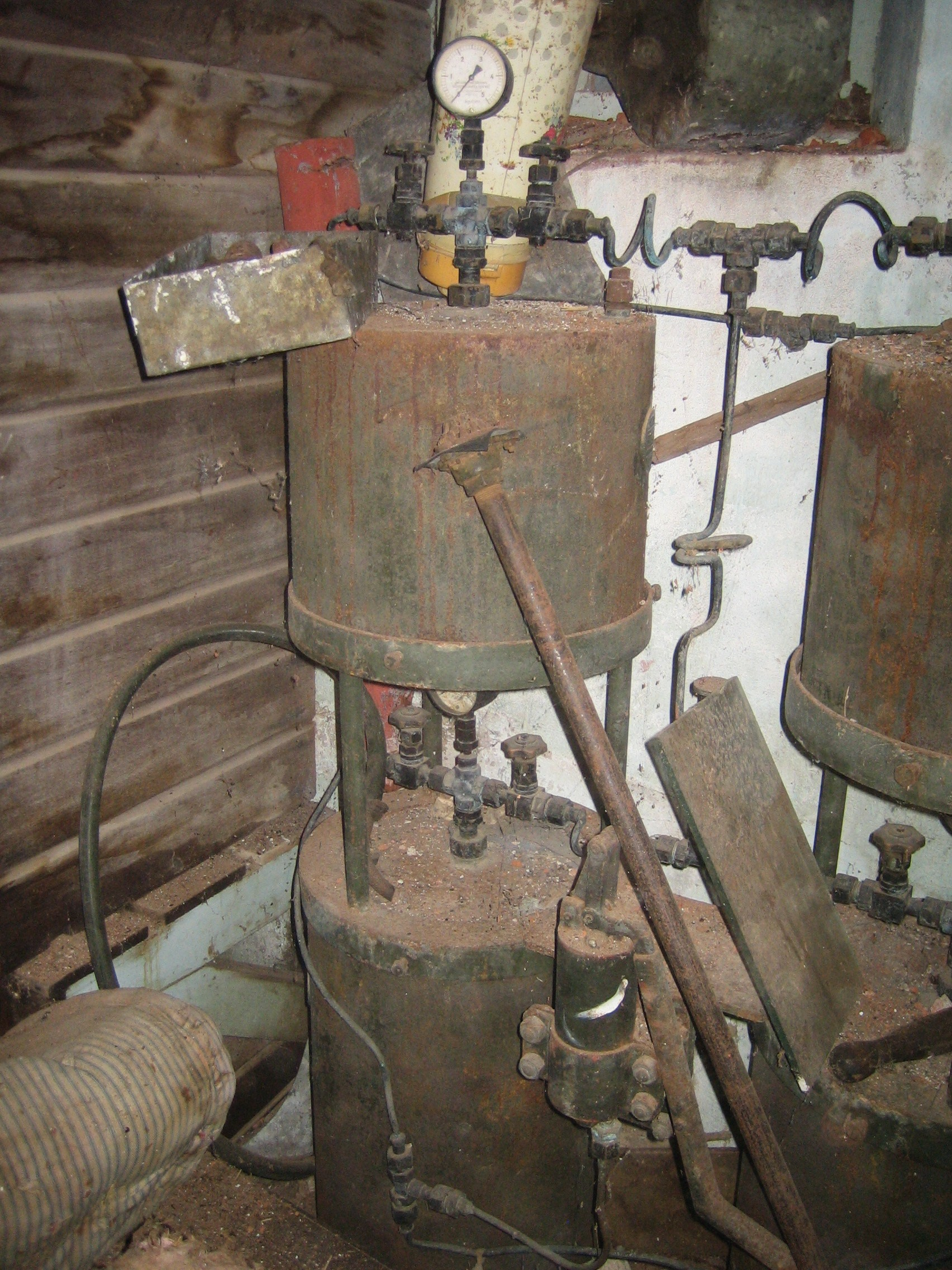
Pressure vessel for the light

The lighthouse was originally fitted with first-order Fresnel lens. The intense earthquake of 1990 that hit most of Luzon damaged the lenses and displaced the mechanism alignment of the original first-order apparatus, making it inoperable.

The beam now comes from a modern electric lamp powered by solar panels. The light before was provided by pressurized kerosene lamps very much like "Coleman lamps". In 2005, the old pressure vessels and wicks for the light could still be found in the shed.

== Historical markers ==
Cape Bojeador Lighthouse was declared a National Historical Landmark on August 13, 2004, and a National Cultural Treasure on June 20, 2005, by the Philippine government.

== Gallery ==
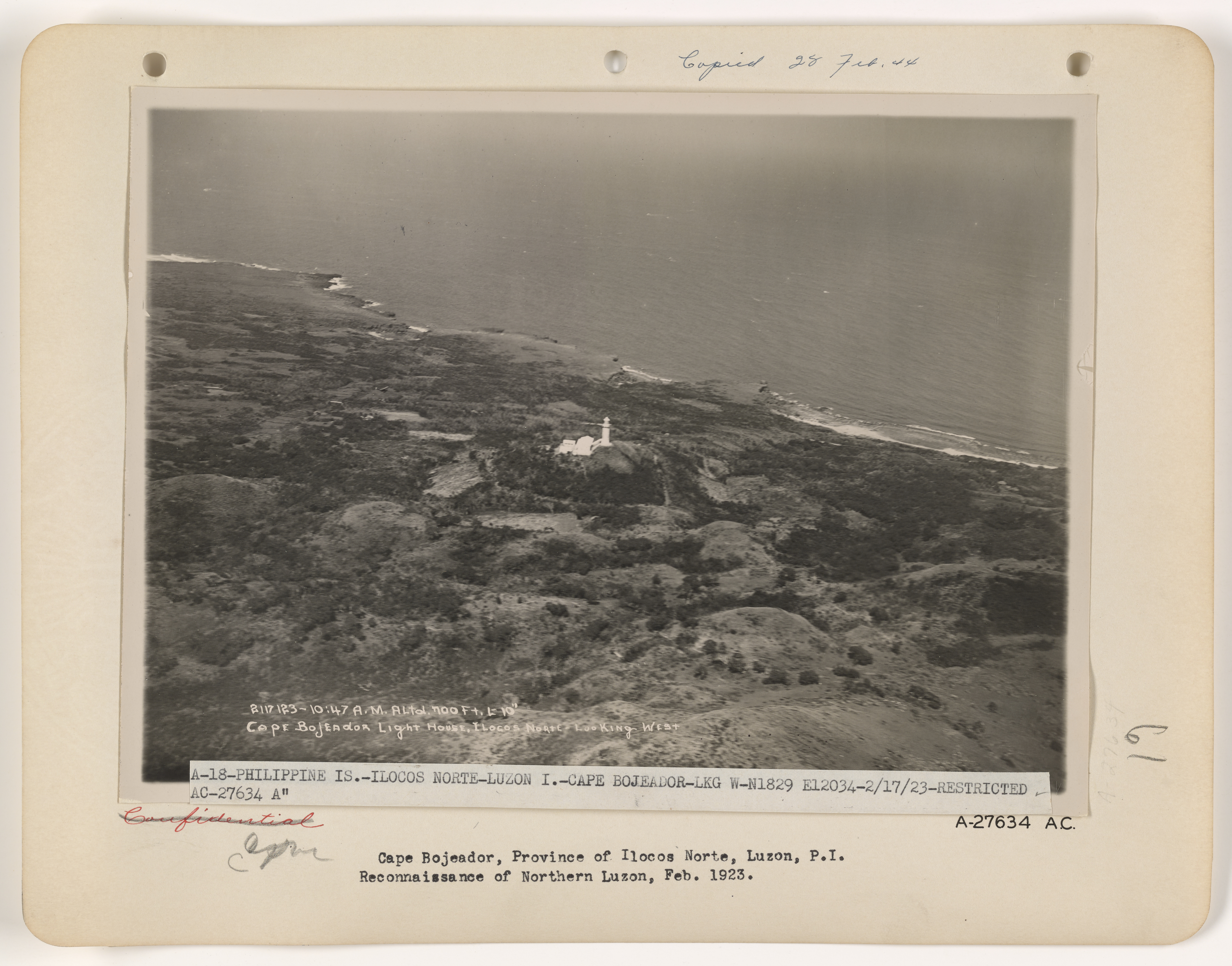
Aerial view of Cape Bojeador and its lighthouse (center), 1923

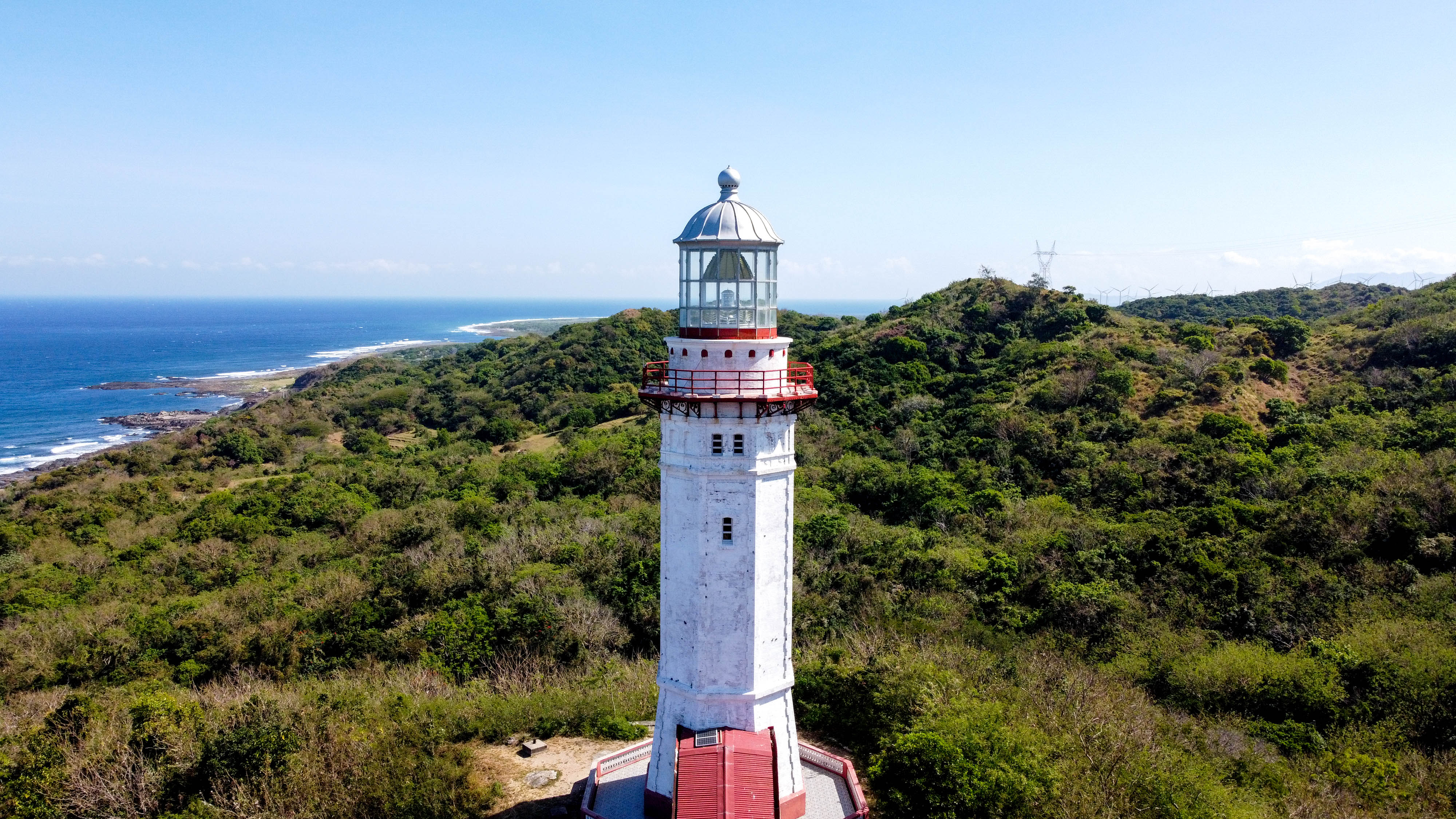
Close-up, top view of the lighthouse

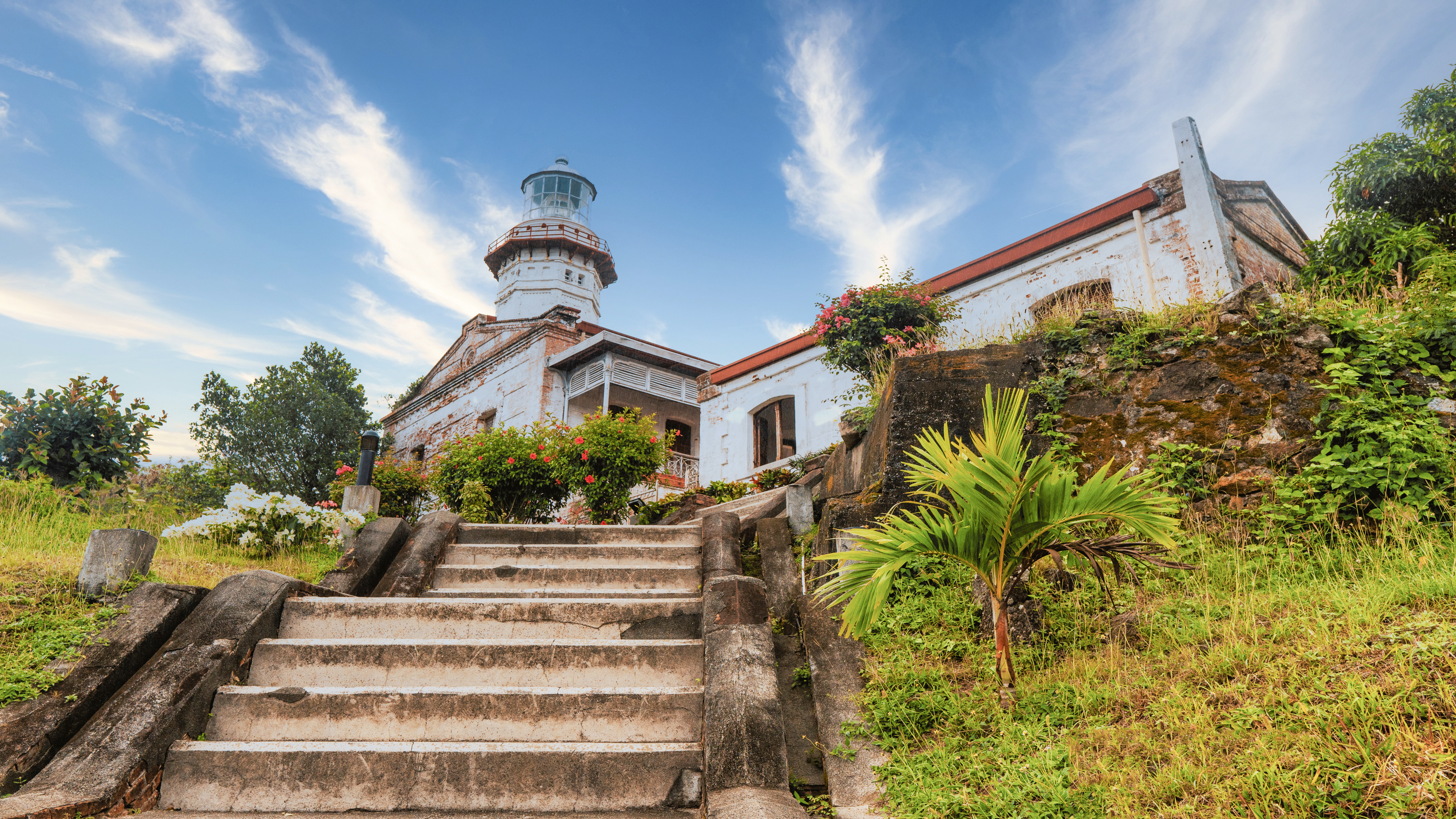
Pathway leading up to the lighthouse

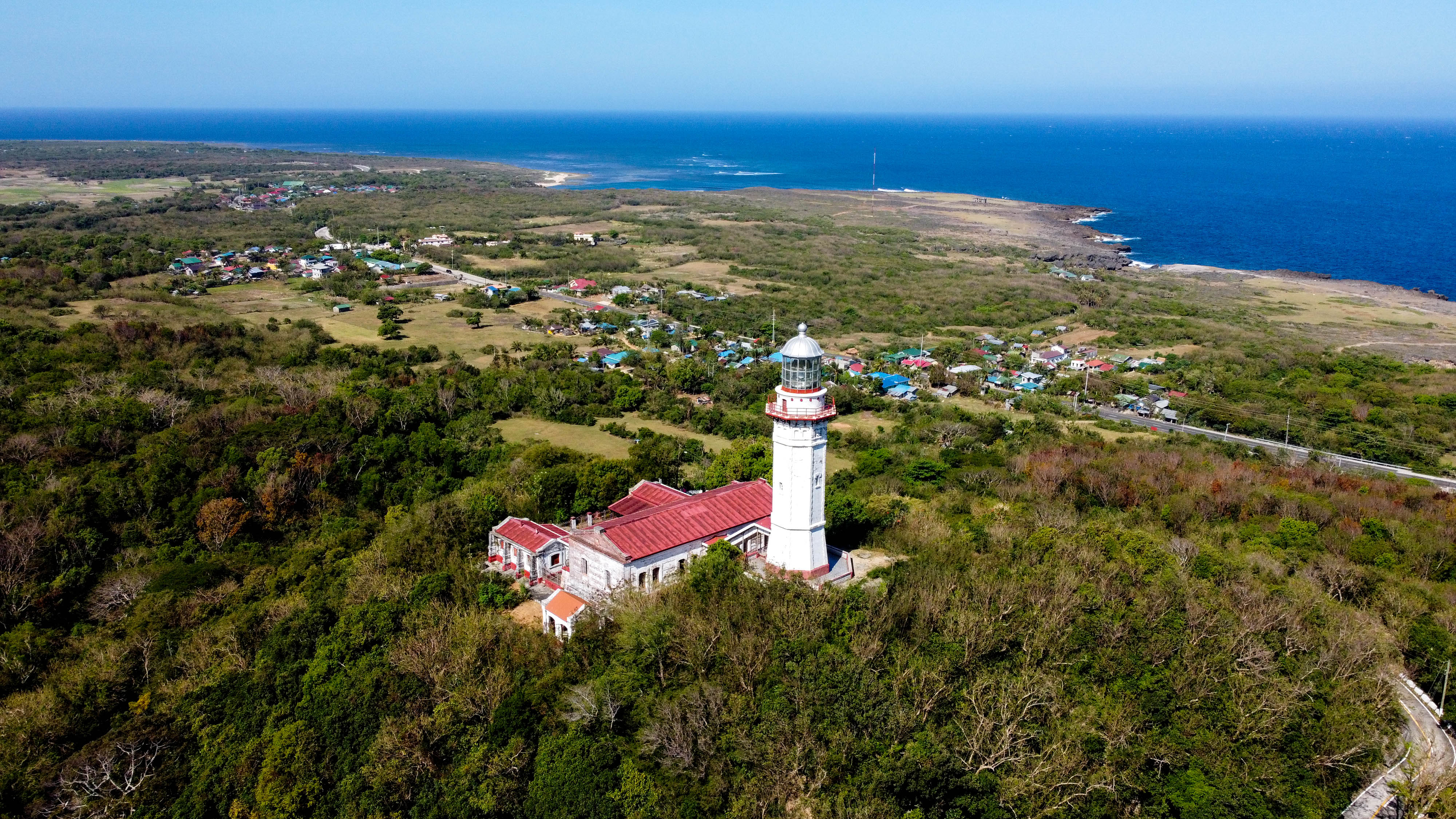
The lighthouse and the shoreline

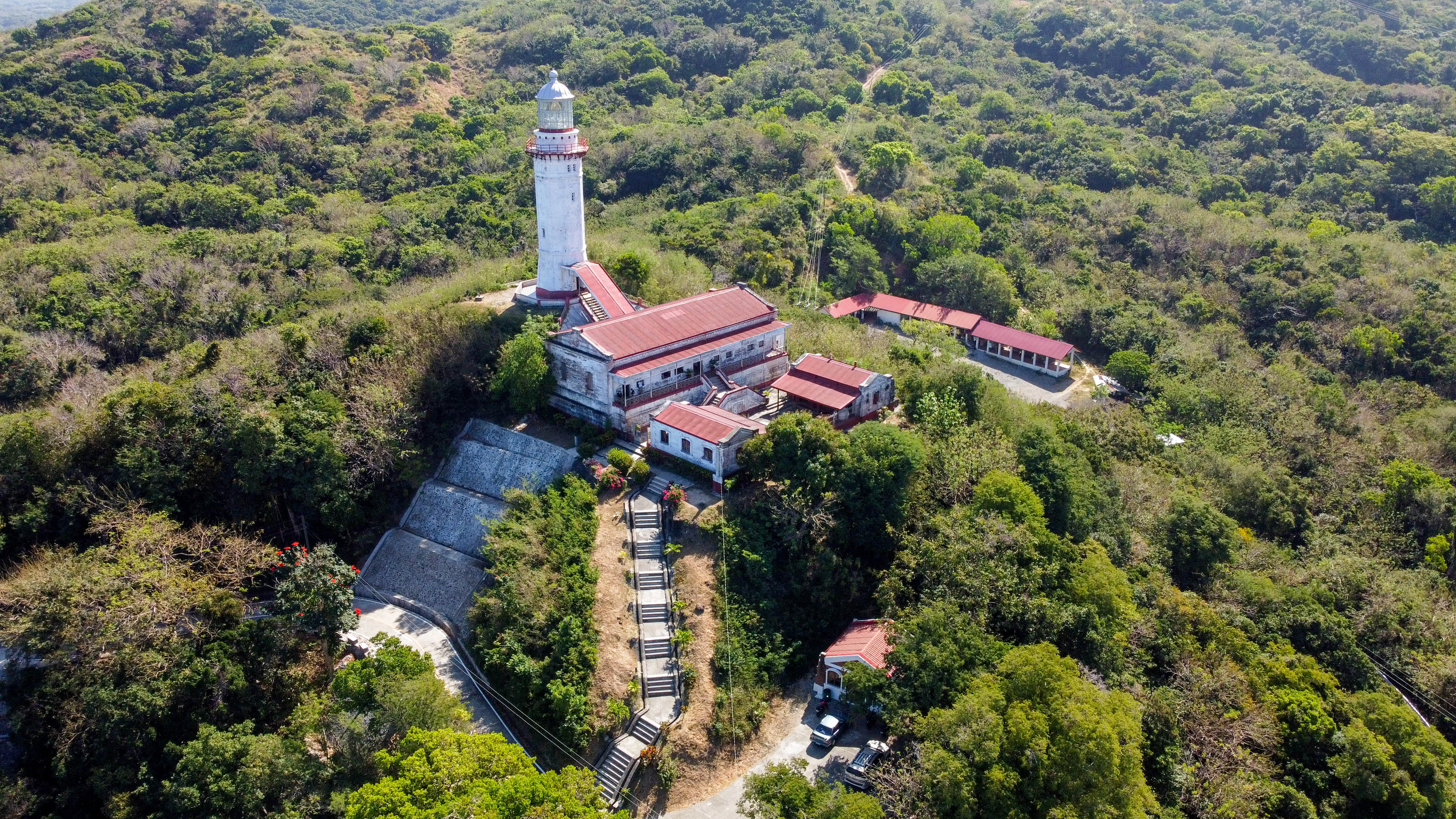
Aerial shot of the lighthouse in 2021

== See also ==
- List of lighthouses in the Philippines
