= Cape Engaño =

Cape Engaño may refer to:

- Cape Engaño (Luzon), Philippines
  - Cape Engaño Lighthouse
- Cape Engaño (Dominican Republic)

== See also ==
- Engano River (disambiguation)
