= Cagayan Valley Eastern Seaboard Highway =

Route information
- Length: 335 km (208 mi)

Major junctions
- North end: Santa Ana, Cagayan
- South end: Casiguran, Aurora

Location
- Country: Philippines
- Provinces: Aurora, Isabela, Cagayan

Highway system
- Roads in the Philippines; Highways; Expressways; List

The Cagayan Valley Eastern Seaboard Highway is a proposed 335-kilometer (208 mi) coastal highway in northern Luzon in the Philippines. It is intended to connect the town of Santa Ana in Cagayan and Casiguran in Aurora.

== Development ==
The Regional Development Council of Cagayan Valley in its regular meeting held on December 12, 2018, requested the National Economic and Development Authority (NEDA) and the Department of Public Works and Highways (DPWH) for funding of a pre-feasibility study for a coastal highway in the region dubbed as the Cagayan Valley Eastern Seaboard Highway. By June 2019, the project is already in DPWH's pipeline for technical studies.

== Highway ==
The proposed Cagayan Valley Eastern Seaboard Highway runs along the coastline of Cagayan Valley, most of which will traverse the provinces of Cagayan and Isabela. Part of the proposed highway is in the Central Luzon province of Aurora. It is intended to connect the municipalities of Santa Ana, Cagayan, and Casiguran, Aurora. Four kilometers (2.5 mi) of the 335-kilometer (208 mi) highway will consist of bridges.
