= Engano River =

Engano River may refer to either of two rivers of Santa Catarina state in southeastern Brazil:

- Engano River (Itajaí River)
- Engano River (Uruguay River)

== Other ==
- Do Engano River

== See also ==
- Cape Engaño (disambiguation)
