= Cape Bojeador =

Northwestern tip of Luzon, Philippines

Coordinates: 18.4917°N 120.5639°E

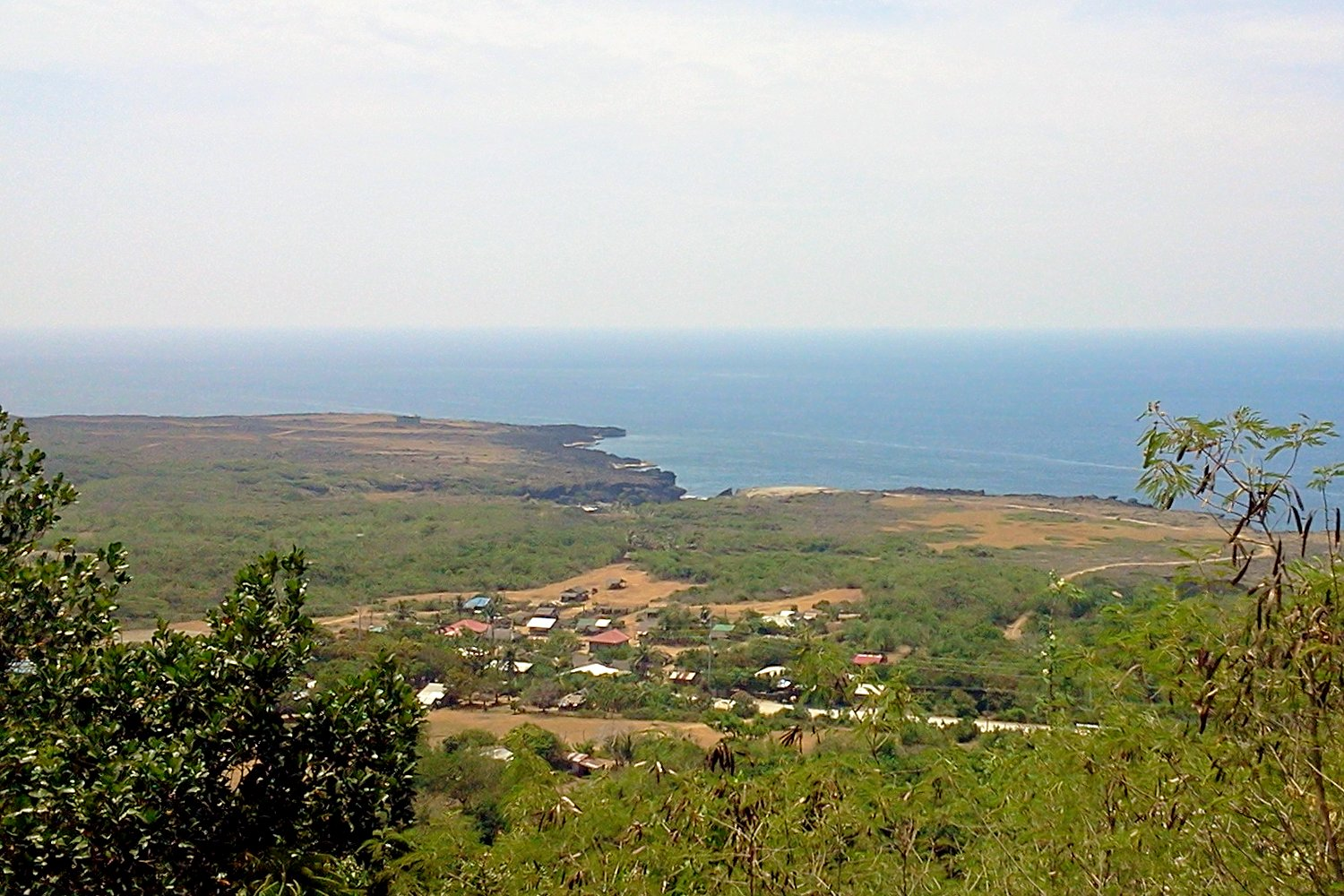
View of Cape Bojeador from the Cape Bojeador Lighthouse

Cape Bojeador (Filipino: Cabo Bojeador) is the northwestern tip of the island of Luzon in the Philippines. It is a headland on the South China Sea coast of the municipality of Burgos, Ilocos Norte, some 40 kilometres (25 mi) north of Laoag. The cape is best known for its Spanish lighthouse, the most visited lighthouse in the country and a favorite shooting venue for local movies and television series.

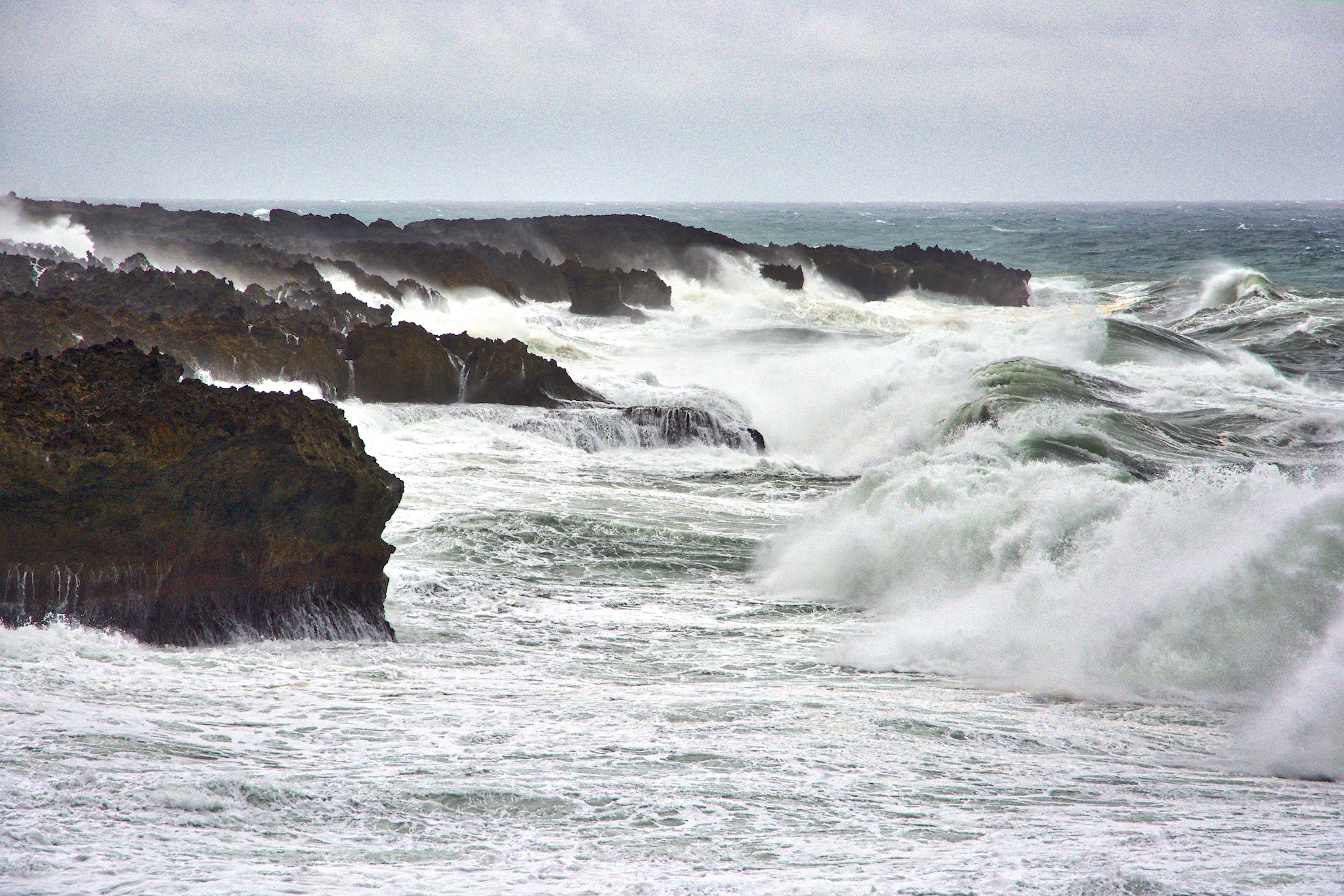
Waves at Cape Bojeador

== Geography ==
Cape Bojeador is the first land sighted by vessels approaching Luzon from the northern ports of China and East Asia. It is located in the southern end of Nagabungan Cove in a small village called Paayas in Burgos municipality. The cape reaches a height of 91.44 metres (300 ft) near the lighthouse, sloping down to 7 metres (23 ft) near the shore and rising southeastward to a mountain ridge. It is composed of greywackes and volcanic rocks dated as Middle Miocene.

The cape is devoid of trees due to constant strong winds. It is surrounded by rocky cliffs and a reef of breakers projecting from it. The Cape Bojeador Lighthouse is situated on the summit of the Vigia de Nagpartian Hill, 1,600 metres (1,750 yd) east from the northwest extreme of the cape.
