= Palaui Island Protected Landscape and Seascape =

Island and protected area in Cagayan, Philippines

- IUCN category V (protected landscape/seascape)
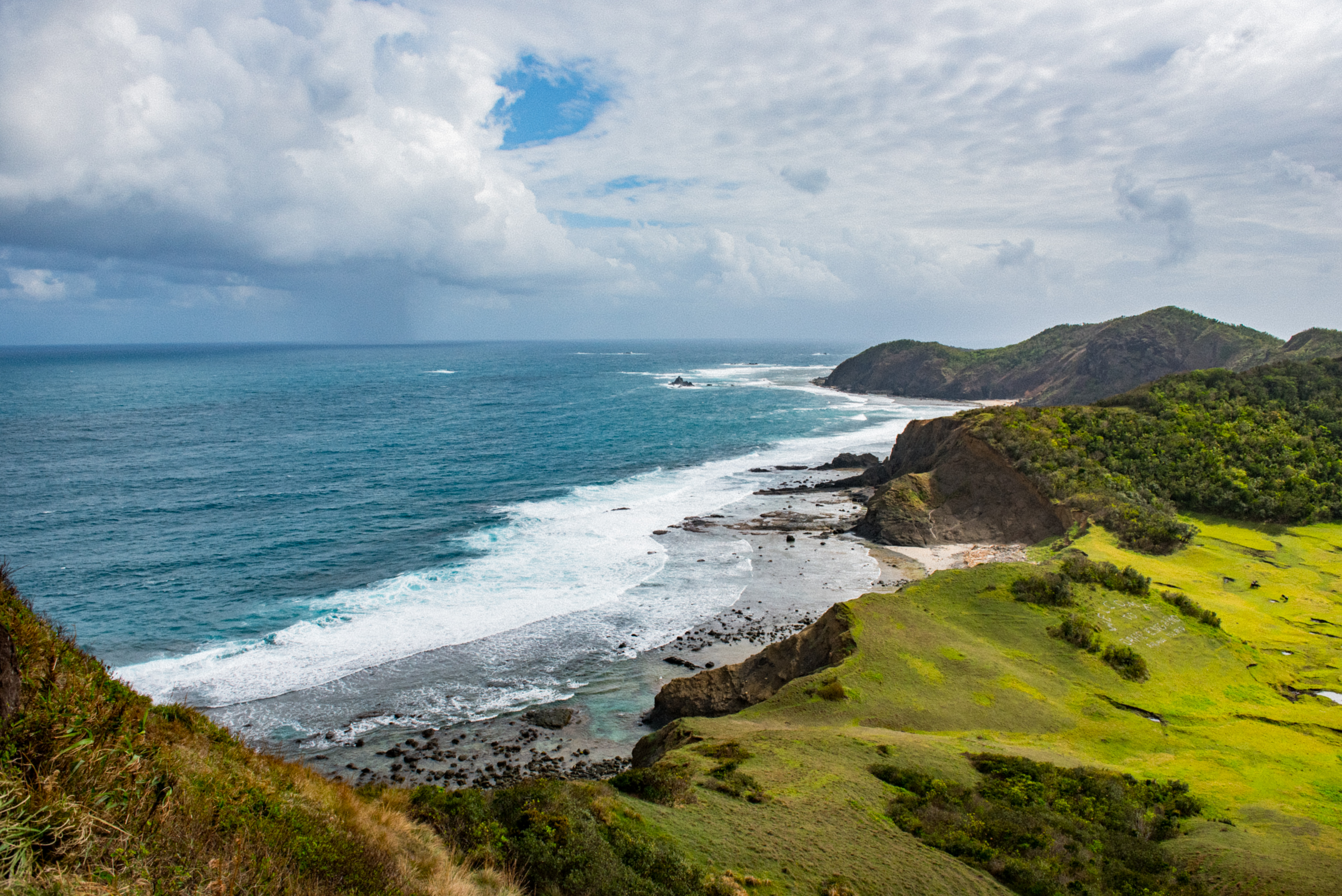

- Location within Luzon Location within Philippines
- Location: Santa Ana, Cagayan, Philippines
- Coordinates: 18°32′46″N 122°8′11″E
- Area: 8,048.57 hectares (19,888.4 acres)
- Established: August 16, 1994
- Governing body: Department of Environment and Natural Resources

The Palaui Island Protected Landscape and Seascape is an island that is a protected area and national park in the municipality of Santa Ana in Cagayan, Philippines. It is located off the northeastern extremity of Luzon Island.

== Geography ==
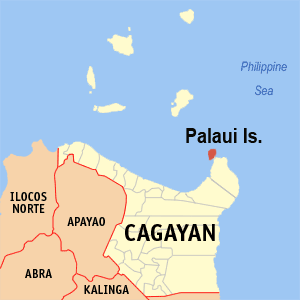
Palaui Island, the main geographic feature of the protected area

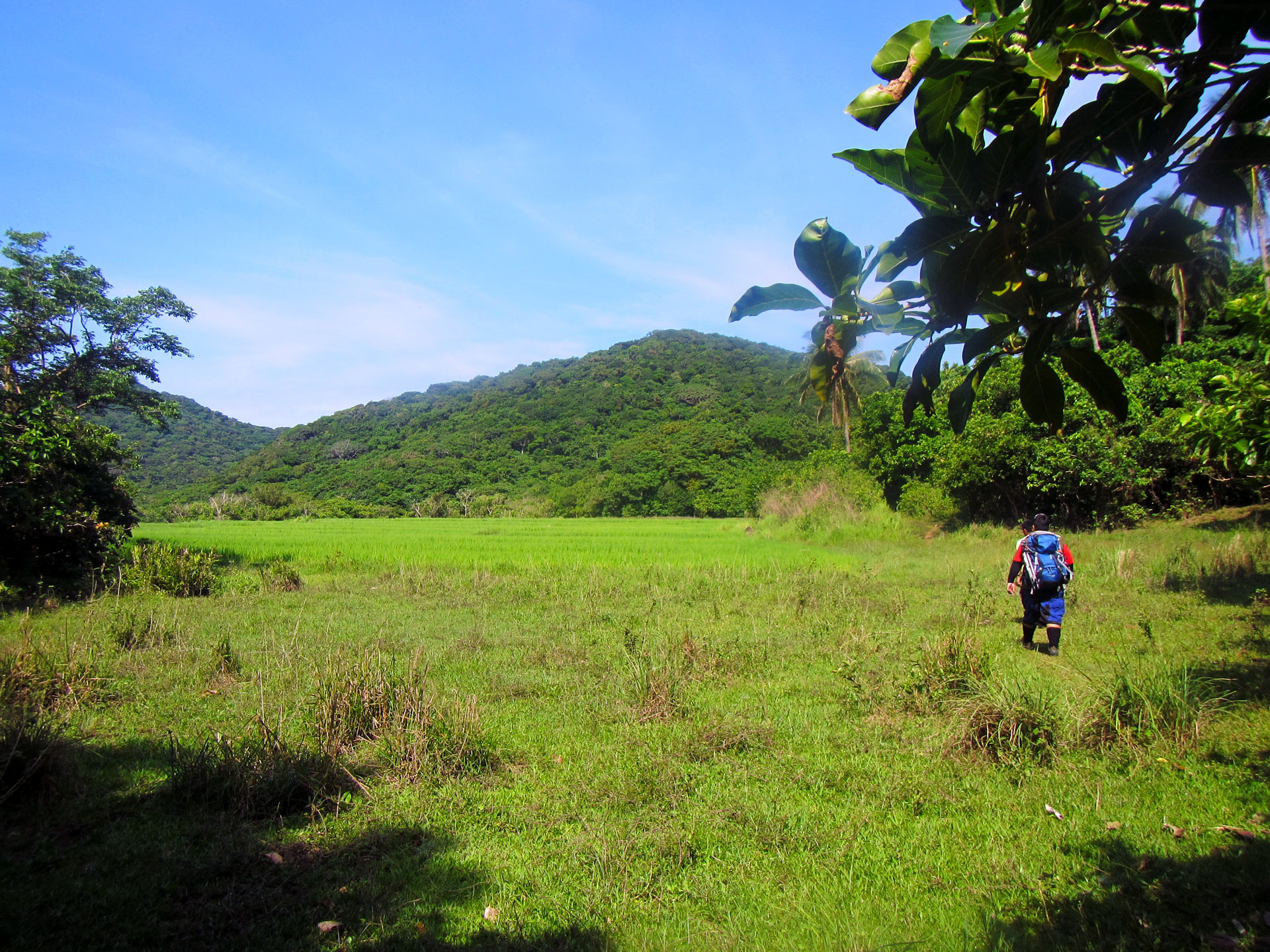
Grassland interior of Palaui island

Palaui Island lies off the northwestern part of a large promontory in San Vicente, in the municipality of Santa Ana, Cagayan province. It is 10 kilometres (6.2 mi) at its longest and about 5 kilometres (3.1 mi) at its widest and moderately high. The western shore of the island appears bold, but on the eastern side, a reef projects from its side for 2.4 kilometres (1.5 mi), the edge of it being 0.8 kilometres (0.50 mi) from and extending around the small islet of Escucha, east of Palaui. The rocky Dos Hermanos Islets lie off Cape Engaño, the northern point of Palaui, and more rocks are off the northeast point of the island, some 1.6 kilometres (0.99 mi) eastward of the cape. Gran Laja Island, a low rock islet surrounded by breakers, is located northeast off Palaui.

At the southwest end of Palaui Island is Puerto Point, a high, wooded bluff. East of this and south of Palaui is Rona Island, low and wooded with a white base of sand and rocks. The islet of Escucha is high and wooded islet, east of Palaui and beyond Rona Island, when seen from southwestward through the channel between Palaui Island and the mainland, where a few more islets are located.

== Flora and fauna ==
Palaui Island was declared as a National Marine Reserve on August 28, 1994 encompassing an area of 7,145 hectares (17,660 acres). The waters around the island boast of 21 commercial species of fishes with about 50 hectares (120 acres) of undisturbed corals.

Palaui Island is a sanctuary for 90 migratory birds.

== Tourism ==
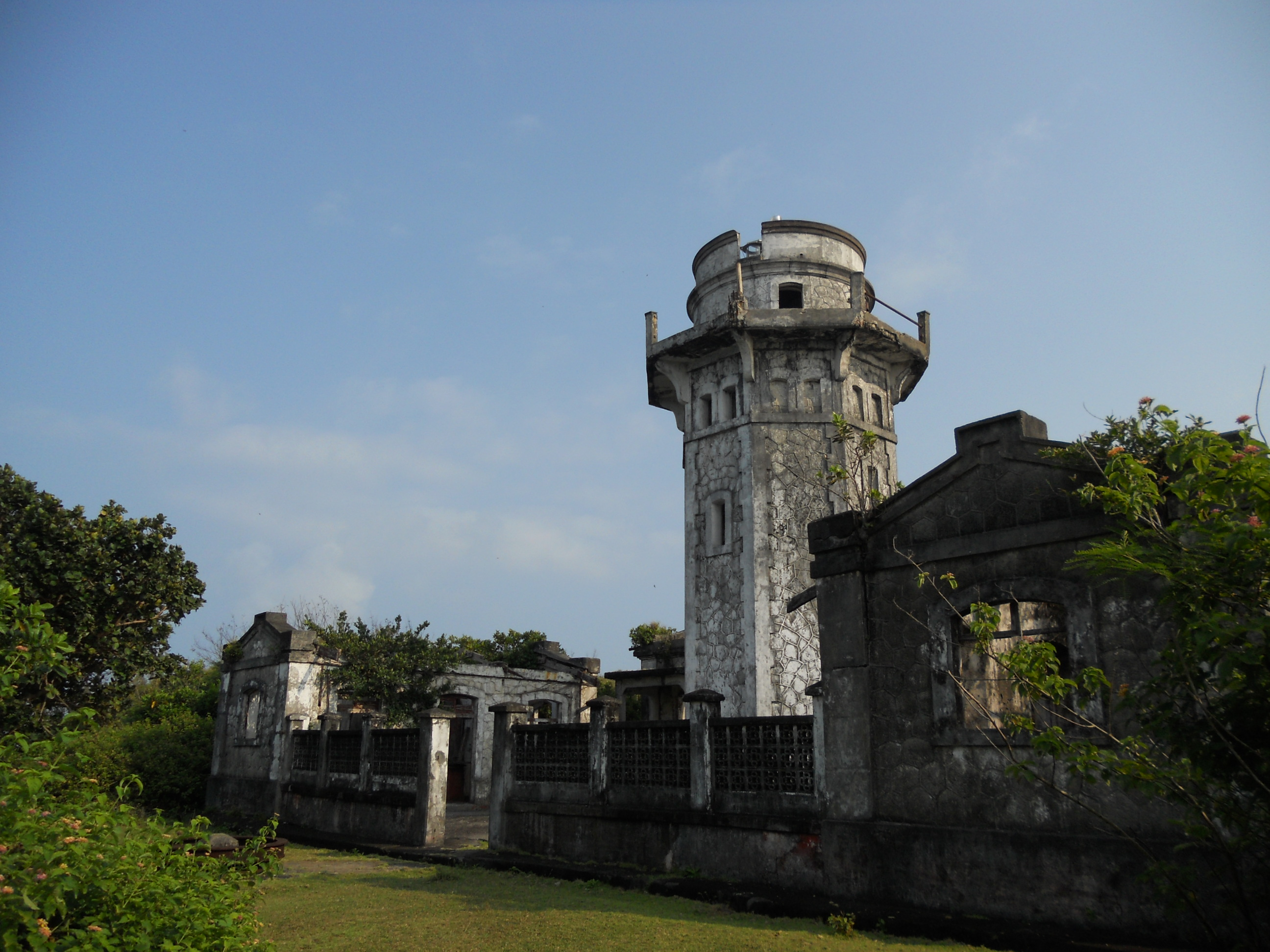
The lighthouse at Cape Engaño

Among the destinations in the Palaui is the northern point of the island is the Cape Engaño Lighthouse which is situated at Cape Engaño the northern point of the island and its beaches. The island is the tenth entry in CNN's World's 100 Best Beaches list which was published on May 13, which remarked the island's "raw beauty".

On June 22, 2018, the Palaui Island Protected Landscape and Seascape was designated a national park through the Expanded National Integrated Protected Areas System (ENIPAS) Act or Republic Act No. 11038. In January 2019, the island won the Association of Southeast Asian Nations (ASEAN) Community-Based Tourism Award for 2019-2021 "for promoting sustainable tourism through the efforts of the island’s environmental group, the Palaui Environmental Protectors Association (PEPA)".

== Transportation ==
The Port of San Vicente in the Cagayan mainland serves residents and tourist going to or departing from Palaui Island. Docking areas in Palaui is Punta Verde and the coastline of Engaño Cove.

== In popular culture ==
In 2013, it was used as the filming location for Survivor: Blood vs. Water and Survivor: Cagayan.

== See also ==
- List of islands of the Philippines
- List of protected areas of the Philippines
