= Cape Engaño (Luzon) =

Northern point of Palaui Island

- Cape
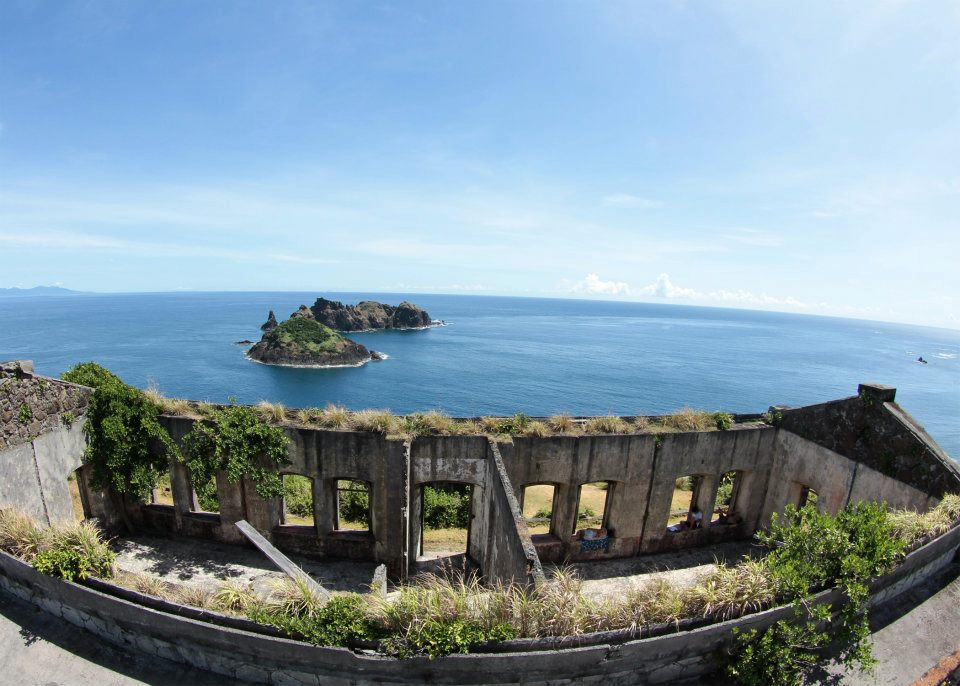
- View of the cape from the Cape Engaño Lighthouse

- Location within Philippines
- Coordinates: 18°34′42″N 122°08′28″E
- Location: Palaui Island, Philippines
- Water bodies: Pacific Ocean

Cape Engaño is a cape and northern point of Palaui Island, an island off the northeasternmost point of the island of Luzon in the Philippines. It is administratively part of the municipality of Santa Ana in Cagayan province and is known for its lush green landscape, white sand beach and the Cape Engaño Lighthouse.

It has given its name to the World War II battle off Cape Engaño, part of the larger Battle of Leyte Gulf, although the battle actually took place some 200 miles (322 km) to the east, in open ocean. The Japanese aircraft carriers Zuikaku, Zuihō, Chitose and Chiyoda were repeatedly bombarded and sank, as well as three light cruisers and nine destroyers.

== Gallery ==
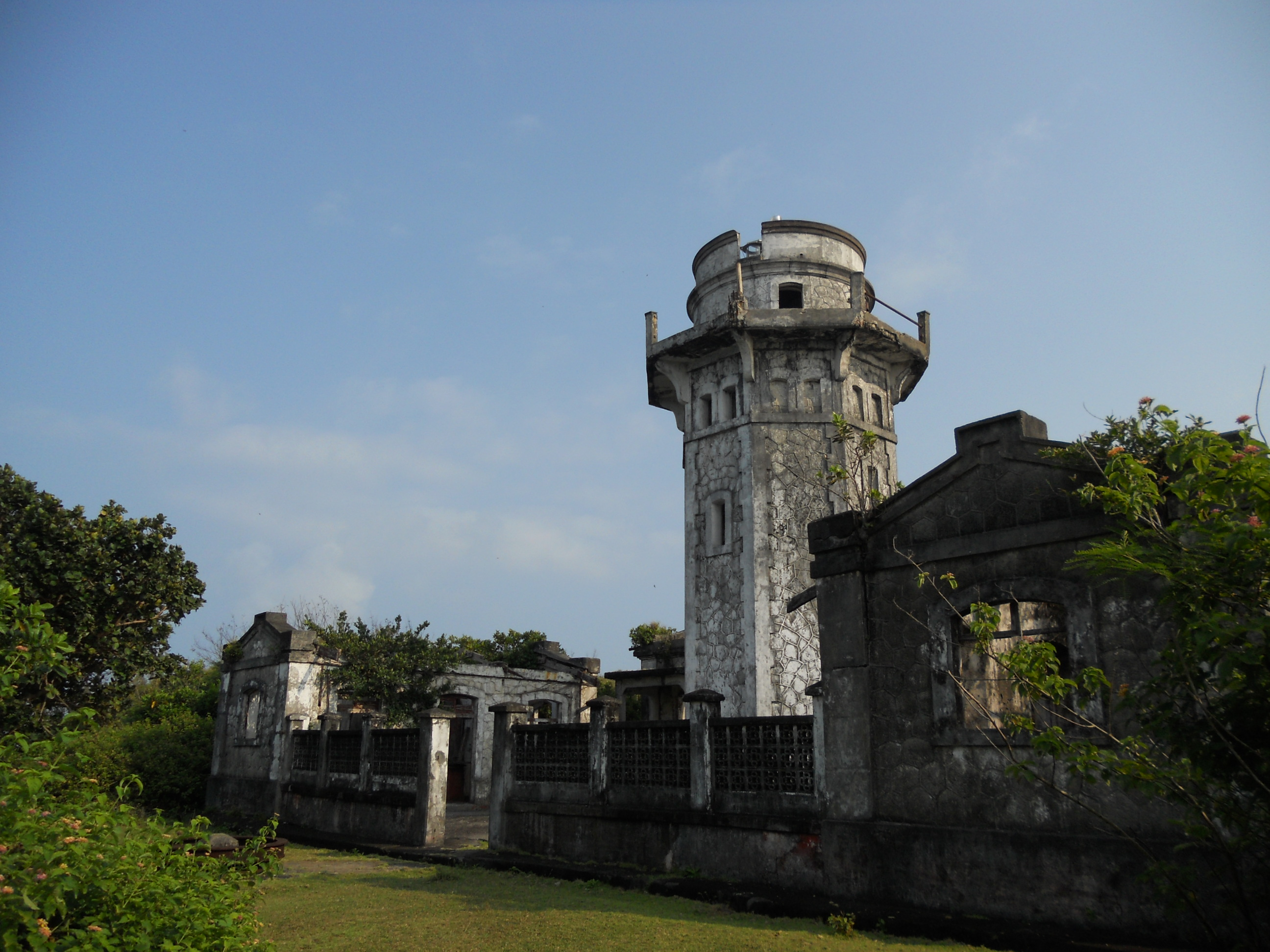
The lighthouse at Cape Engaño

View of the cape and lighthouse from the ocean
