= Cape Engaño Lighthouse =

Historic lighthouse in Cagayan, Philippines

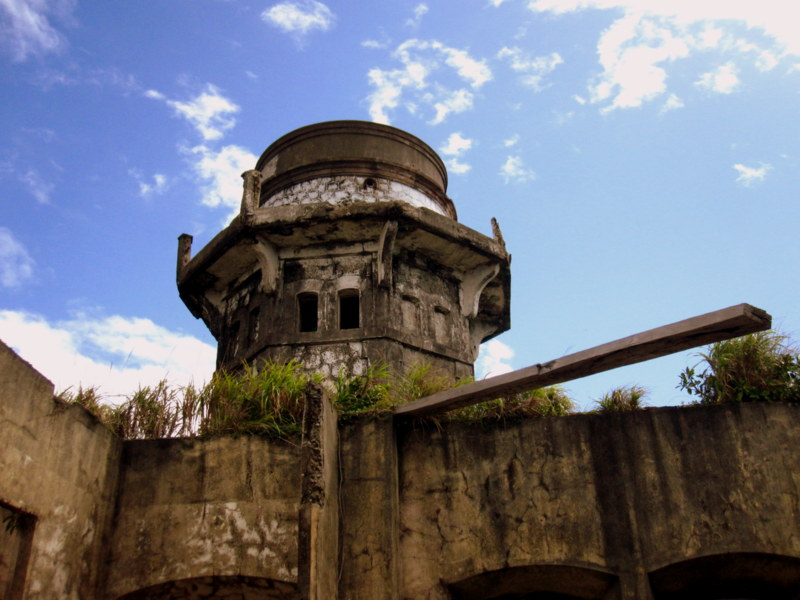
- The lighthouse on Palaui Island was built during the Spanish colonial era and first lit on December 30, 1892.
- Location: Palaui Island; Santa Ana; Cagayan; Philippines
- Coordinates: 18°34′47.51″N 122°8′15.68″E

Tower
- Constructed: 1892
- Construction: Stone
- Height: 14.5 metres (48 ft)
- Shape: Octagonal tower with balcony and lantern removed, in the middle of an enclosed court
- Markings: Light gray tower
- Power source: solar power
- Heritage: Important Cultural Property
- Fog signal: none

Light
- First lit: 1892
- Focal height: 100 metres (330 ft)
- Lens: first-order catadioptric lens
- Range: 27 nautical miles (50 km; 31 mi)
- Characteristic: Fl W 5s.

Cape Engaño Lighthouse, also known as Faro de Cabo Engaño (Filipino: Parola ng Tangos Engaño), is a historic lighthouse located at Cape Engaño on Palaui Island in the town of Santa Ana, the province of Cagayan, Philippines. Located at the northernmost part of Luzon Island and situated atop the summit of a hill, 92 meters above sea level, the lighthouse provides a 360-degree view of Babuyan Island and the Dos Hermanas Island (Two Sisters) on the North, Pacific Ocean on the West and Engaño cove on the East.

Cape Engaño Lighthouse is now under the supervision of the Department of Transportation and Communications through the Philippine Coast Guard's lighthouse division.

== History ==
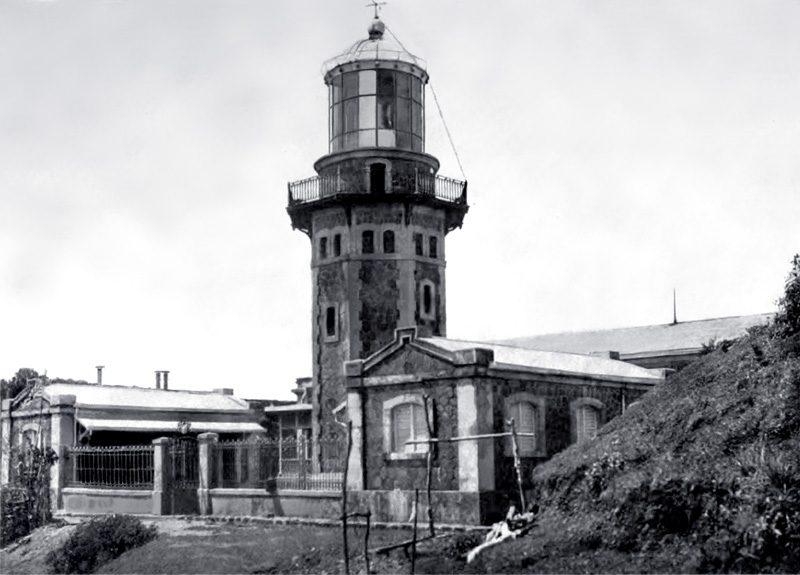
The lighthouse in 1903

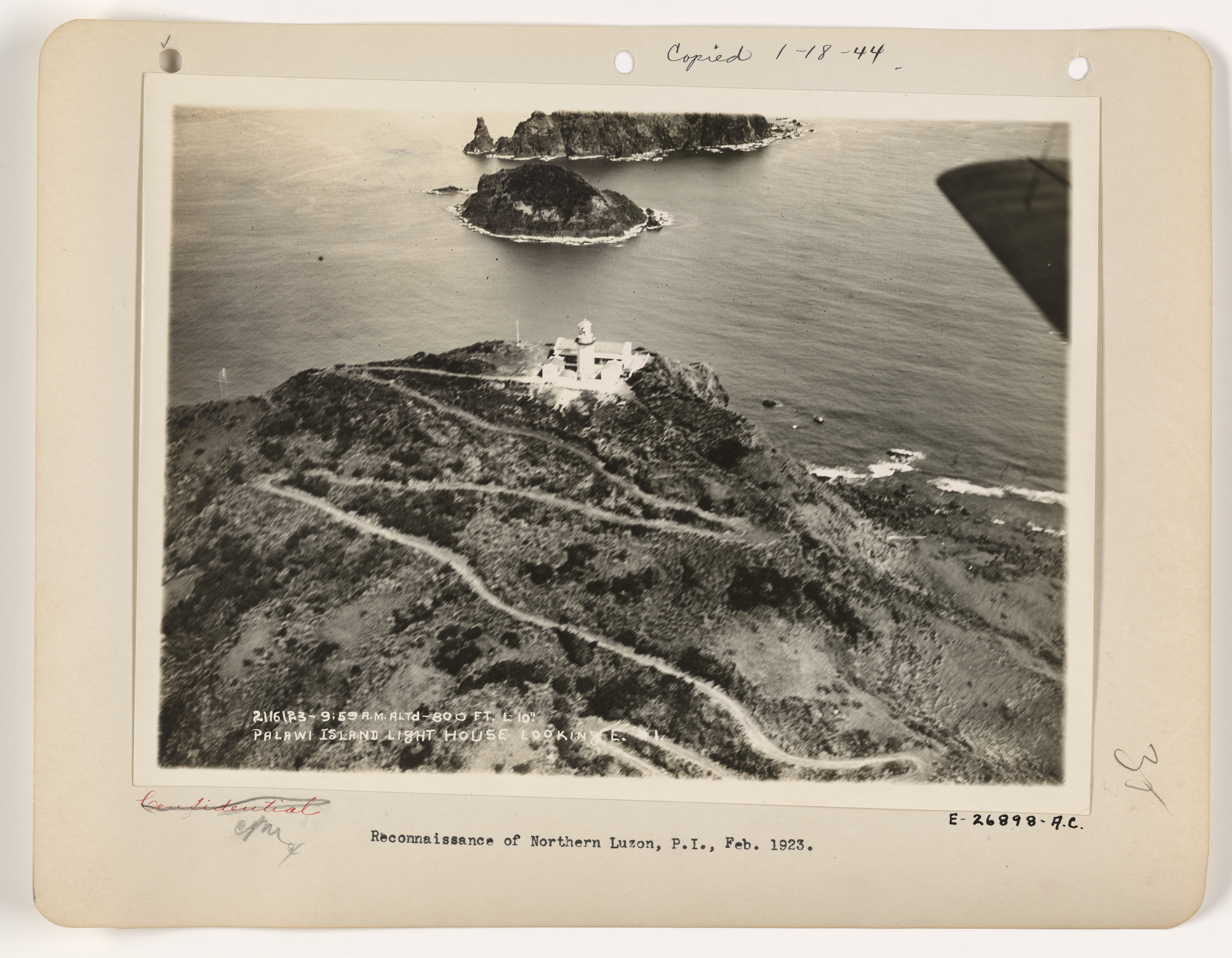
Aerial view of the lighthouse, 1923

Faro de Cabo Engaño is one of the four lighthouses built during the Spanish colonial period, which served as gateway lighthouse for incoming ships. The construction started on 21 September 1888 and finished on 31 December 1892, wherein most of the labourers are Filipinos.

=== The Jamorabon family ===
The Cape Engaño Lighthouse was for generations the home of the Jamorabons. They also worked as lighthouse keepers, notably Gregorio Jamorabon, the longest-servicing keeper. The complex used to shelter seven crew members tasked to maintain the lighthouse. At that time, according to Teresa Jamorabon, late wife of Gregorio Jamorabon, the lighthouse was the only place where residents enjoyed electricity.

Teresa Jamorabon described how well the government took care of the lighthouse keepers and the station. Their rations of rice, beans, noodles, cooking oil and kerosene arrived every month and were shared equally among the workers, regardless of rank.

According to the Jamorabons, the name of the lighthouse was given by Spaniard seafarers when they first set foot on the cape and were so stunned by its natural beauty that they named it "Engaño".

== Structure ==
The structure was initially designed by Engineer Magin Pers y Pers, who also designed the lighthouses on Cape Bojeador and Capones Island; further design work was provided by Guillermo Brockman.

The lighthouse complex is composed of the housing pavilion that served as an office and workers quarter, the service buildings that served as kitchen and storage, and the 11-meter octagonal tower that houses the crown and the copper lantern (but was now a solar-based lighting mechanism) that is visible in all angles of the lighthouse. This was all built using local materials, masonry and hardwood.

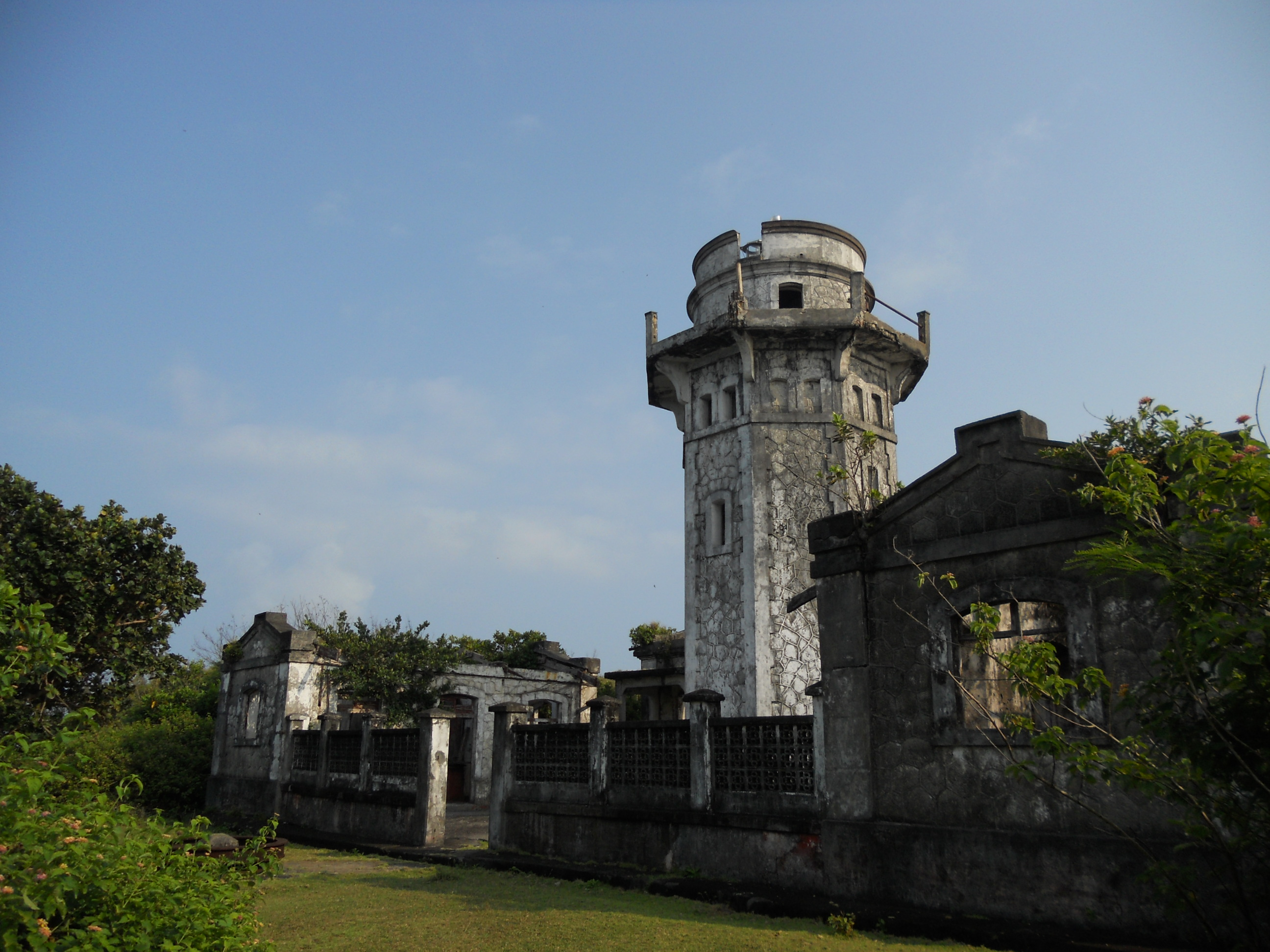
The lighthouse in 2011

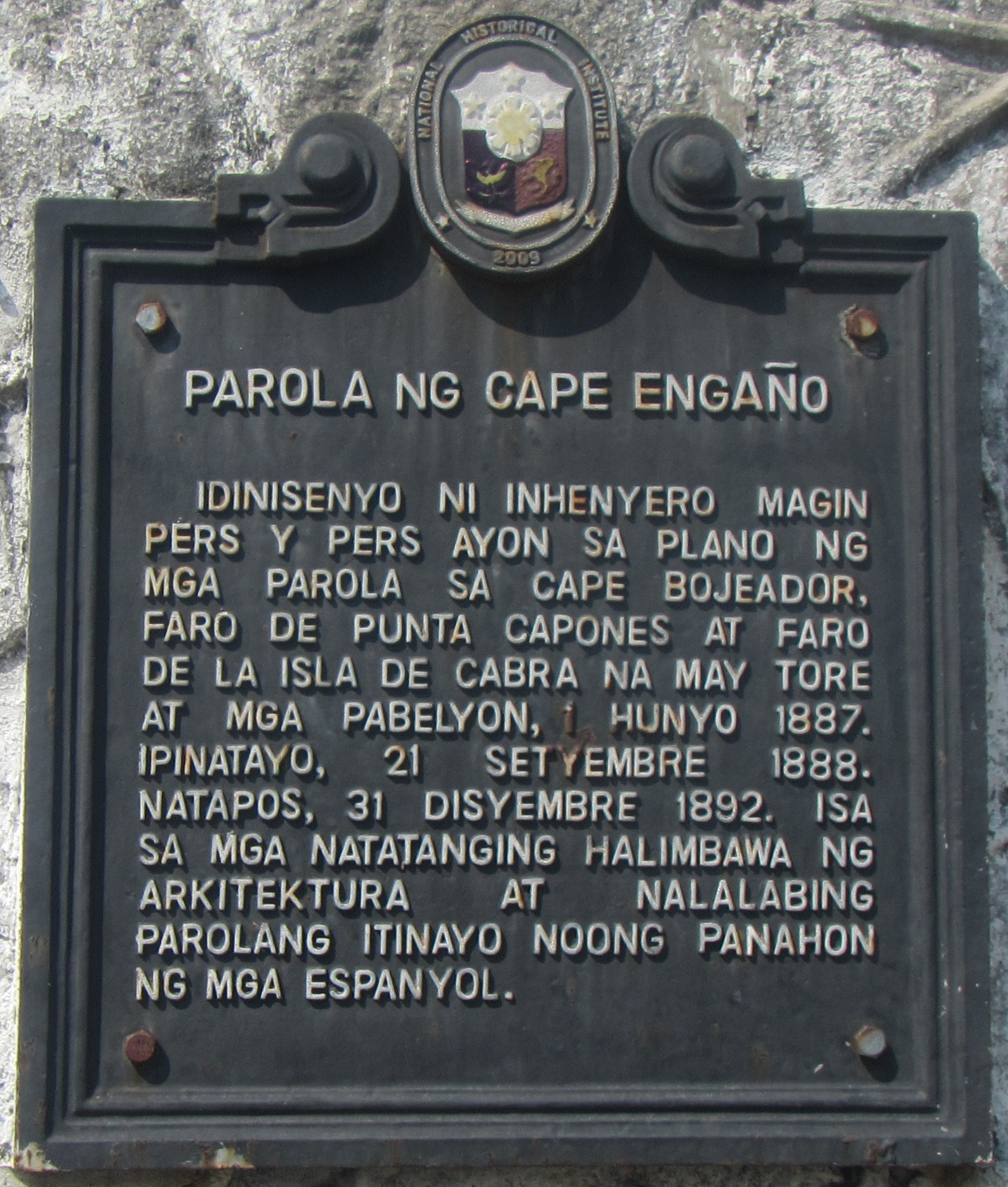
The NHCP historical marker at the base of the lighthouse

== See also ==
- List of lighthouses in the Philippines
- List of Cultural Properties of the Philippines in Cagayan Valley
