= Santa Ana, Cagayan =

Municipality in Cagayan, Philippines

Santa Ana
- Municipality
- Municipality of Santa Ana
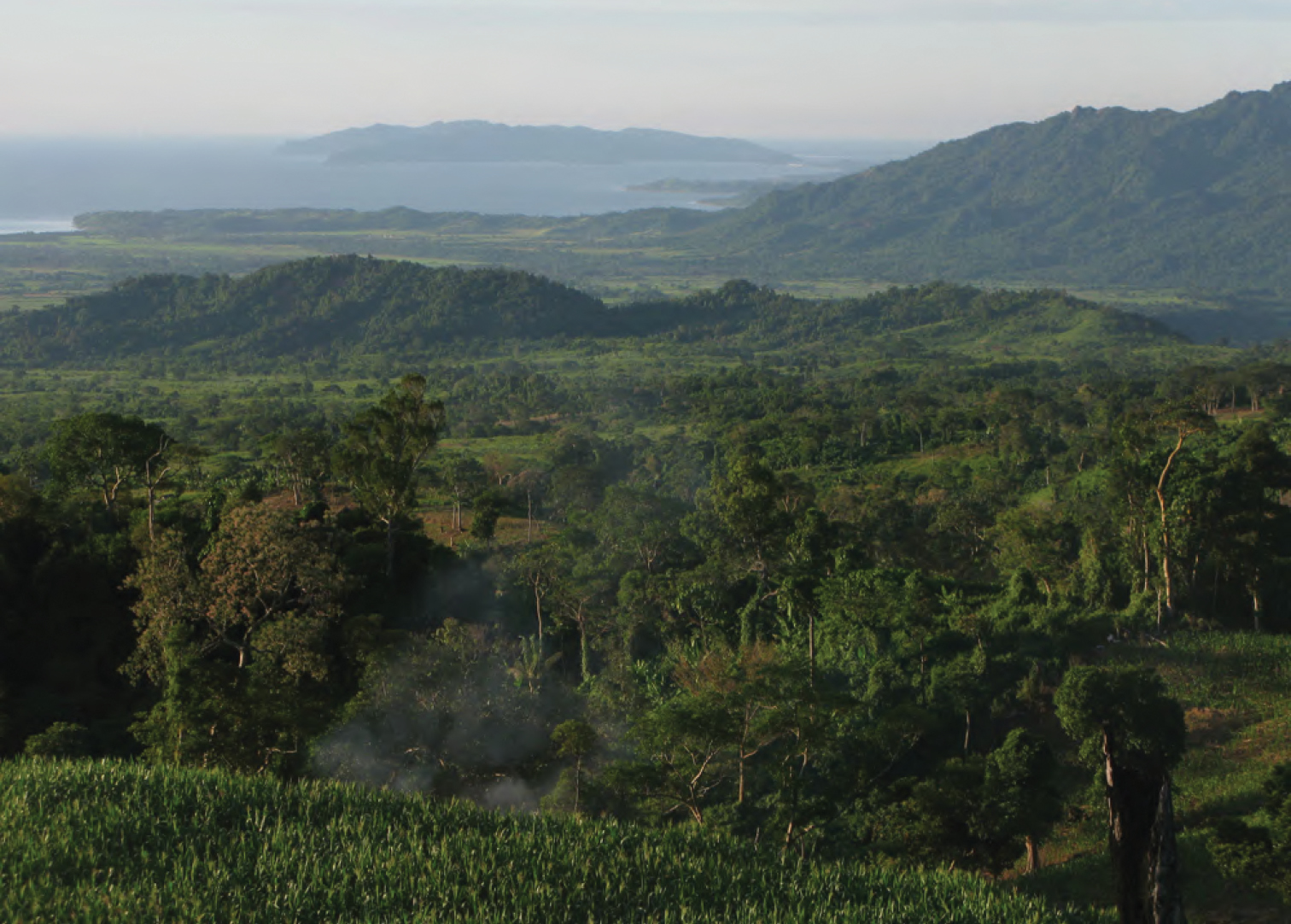
- View of Santa Ana coast from Mount Cagua

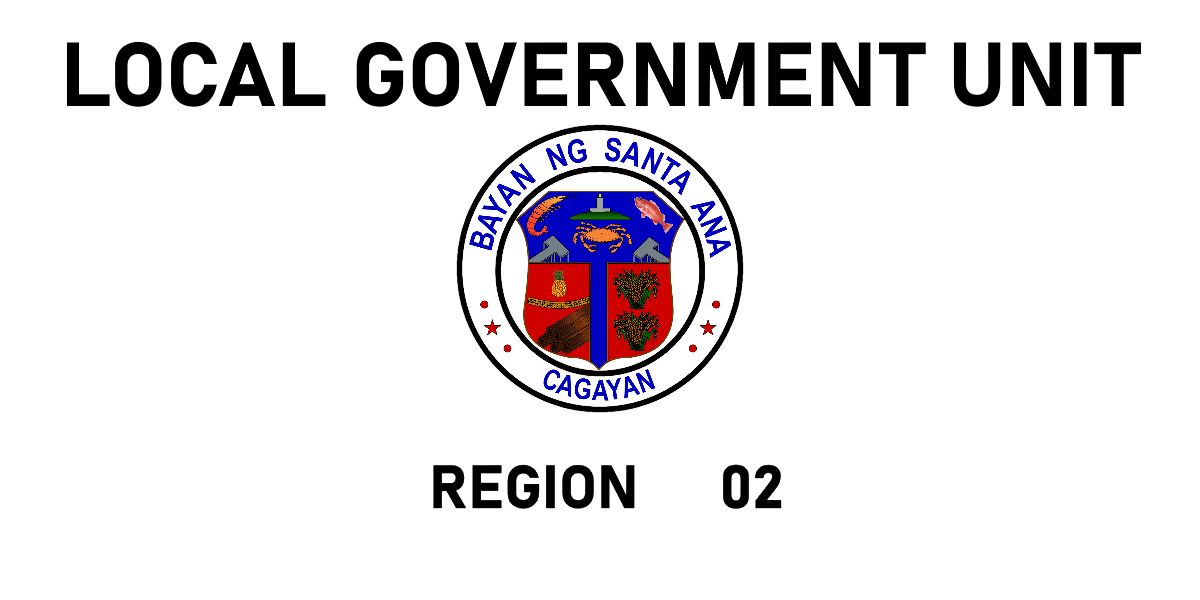
- Flag Seal
- Nickname: Game Fishing Center of the Philippines
- Motto: Sta. Ana: Where the Ocean Meets Opportunity.
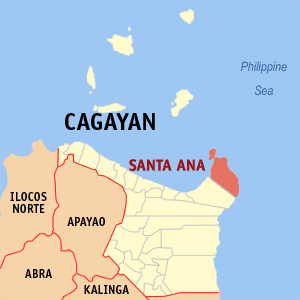
- Map of Cagayan with Santa Ana highlighted
- Interactive map of Santa Ana
- Location within the Philippines
- Coordinates: 18°27′32″N 122°08′31″E
- Country: Philippines
- Region: Cagayan Valley
- Province: Cagayan
- District: 1st district
- Founded: October 21, 1949
- Barangays: 16 (see Barangays)

Government
  - Type: Sangguniang Bayan
  - Mayor: Nelson P. Robinion
  - Vice Mayor: Catherine J. Ladrido
  - Representative: Ramon C. Nolasco Jr.
  - Electorate: 24,099 voters (2025)

Area
  - Total: 441.30 km^{2} (170.39 sq mi)
- Elevation: 64 m (210 ft)
- Highest elevation: 1,142 m (3,747 ft)
- Lowest elevation: 0 m (0 ft)

Population (2024 census)
  - Total: 34,595
  - Density: 78.393/km^{2} (203.04/sq mi)
  - Households: 8,203

Economy
  - Income class: 1st municipal income class
  - Poverty incidence: 8.7% (2023)
  - Revenue: ₱ 295.3 million (2024)
  - Assets: ₱ 952.4 million (2024)
  - Expenditure: ₱ 280.7 million (2024)
  - Liabilities: ₱ 320.8 million (2024)

Service provider
  - Electricity: Cagayan 2 Electric Cooperative (CAGELCO 2)
- Time zone: UTC+8 (PST)
- ZIP code: 3514
- PSGC: 0201523000
- IDD : area code: +63 (0)78
- Native languages: Ibanag; Ilocano; Dupaningan Agta; Tagalog
- Website: https://santaanacagayan.gov.ph/

Santa Ana, officially the Municipality of Santa Ana (Ibanag: Ili nat Santa Ana; Ilocano: Ili ti Santa Ana; Tagalog: Bayan ng Santa Ana), is a municipality in the province of Cagayan, Philippines. According to the 2024 census, it has a population of 34,595 people.

== History ==
The first inhabitants of the region were Negritos and hacheros (woodcutters) under Don Julián Astigarraga (Capitán Vasco, 1854-1901) of Aparri. Some fishermen from Minanga came and settled in Palawig. In 1891, Felipe Agarpao organized a gimong (society) called Inanama with some settlers. The purpose of the organization was to acquire and occupy land in the area. That same year, Briccio Campañano of Lapog, Ilocos Sur and others from Ilocos came to Palawig to apply for homesteads in the sitio of Marede. These settlers organized another gimong called Dagupan.

In 1900, the woodcutters from Aparri arrived by boat. The clearing of forests began shortly after.

From 1919 to 1935, several groups of settlers from the Ilocos Region came to claim territory aboard virays (light boats). The once-forested areas were only accessible via rivers and the sea. Before reaching settlements in the northern and eastern portions of the region, they had to navigate along the Palawig River.

The name Palawig was coined from the local term pasawig, meaning “river mouth”.

In 1935, the gimongs of Inanama and Dagupan were united into the polity of Da Inanama. Headed by Navarro, they began working for the secession of Palawig as a municipality independent of Gonzaga. Their application was held in abeyance because their population did not meet the minimum required by law. The proposal was later suspended in 1941 due to the Second World War .

After the war, Palawig and other neighboring barrios were eventually separated from Gonzaga, and the town was created by President Elpidio Quirino via Executive Order No. 289 on 21 October 1949. Contrary to the usual assumption, the town is not named for Saint Anne, mother of the Blessed Virgin Mary, but is an acronym of the surnames of the then-three provincial officials: Governor Nicasio Arranz and Provincial Board members Federico Navarro and Roberto Avena. The association with Saint Anne was a back-formation in keeping with the tradition of religious, Hispanic toponyms.

== Geography ==
The municipality contains the north-easternmost point of Luzon and also includes Palaui Island. It is the home of the Cagayan Special Economic Zone and the Camilo Osias Naval Base in Barangay San Vicente.

Santa Ana is situated 148.09 kilometres (92.02 mi) from the provincial capital Tuguegarao, and 633.24 kilometres (393.48 mi) from the country's capital city of Manila.

=== Barangays ===
Santa Ana is politically subdivided into 16 barangays. Each barangay consists of puroks while some have sitios. The town is divided into two sections by the Palawig River, east and west.

- Batu-Parada
- Casagan
- Casambalangan (Port Irene)
- Centro (Poblacion)
- Diora-Zinungan
- Dungeg
- Kapanikian
- Marede
- Palawig
- Patunungan
- Rapuli (Punti)
- San Vicente (Fort)
- Santa Clara
- Santa Cruz
- Tangatan
- Visitacion (Poblacion)

=== Climate ===
Santa Ana has a tropical monsoon climate (Am according to the Köppen climate classification) with hot, humid conditions prevailing year round. The average annual high temperature is 28 °C (82 °F) and the average annual low temperature is 23 °C (73 °F). Santa Ana receives 1,818 millimetres (71.6 in) of precipitation annually.

Climate data for Santa Ana, Cagayan
Month	Jan	Feb	Mar	Apr	May	Jun	Jul	Aug	Sep	Oct	Nov	Dec	Year
Mean daily maximum °C (°F)	24 (75)	26 (79)	28 (82)	31 (88)	31 (88)	31 (88)	30 (86)	30 (86)	29 (84)	28 (82)	26 (79)	25 (77)	28 (83)
Mean daily minimum °C (°F)	21 (70)	21 (70)	21 (70)	23 (73)	24 (75)	24 (75)	24 (75)	24 (75)	24 (75)	23 (73)	23 (73)	22 (72)	23 (73)
Average precipitation mm (inches)	150 (5.9)	106 (4.2)	84 (3.3)	48 (1.9)	103 (4.1)	115 (4.5)	134 (5.3)	156 (6.1)	136 (5.4)	240 (9.4)	246 (9.7)	300 (11.8)	1,818 (71.6)
Average rainy days	19	14.3	12.8	10.8	17.7	18.9	21.5	23.3	22.1	20.4	20.3	22.2	223.3
Source: Meteoblue

== Demographics ==
Population census of Santa Ana

Year	Pop.	±% p.a.
1960	7,227	—
1970	9,799	+3.09%
1975	11,360	+3.01%
1980	12,551	+2.01%
1990	17,614	+3.45%
1995	18,640	+1.07%

Year	Pop.	±% p.a.
2000	21,612	+3.22%
2007	25,833	+2.49%
2010	30,458	+6.18%
2015	32,906	+1.48%
2020	35,688	+1.72%
2024	34,595	−0.74%

Source: Philippine Statistics Authority

In the 2024 census, the population of Santa Ana was 34,595 people, with a population density of 78 inhabitants per square kilometre or 200 inhabitants per square mile.

== Economy ==
Poverty incidence of Santa Ana (%)

Source: Philippine Statistics Authority

The economy of Santa Ana is composed of both agriculture and the commercial sectors. Most of the commercial and industrial activities are located in the vicinity Port Irene as part of the Cagayan Special Economic Zone in Barangay Casambalangan.

Some of its agricultural and aquatic products are rice, corn, peanut, fish, lumber, shells, etc. Among its natural resources are limestone deposits at Bawac Mountain, coal at Carbon Mountain, Santa Clara and guano deposits in Kapannikian Cave.

=== Tourism ===
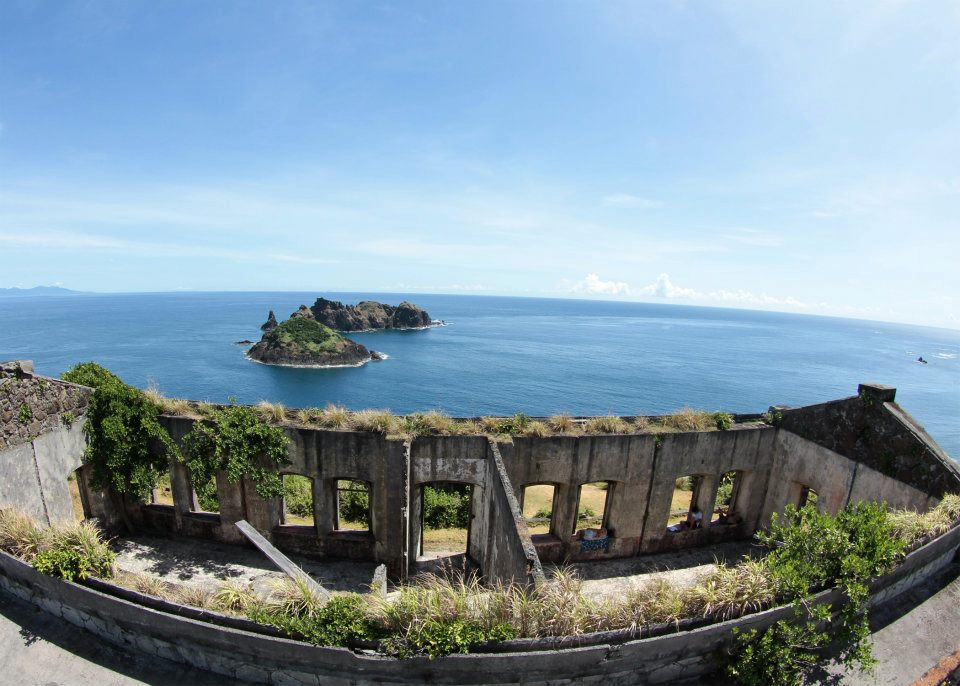
The Pacific Ocean from top of Cape Engaño Lighthouse, Palaui Island

Aside from the Cagayan Special Economic Zone, which hosts casinos and other gaming facilities, Santa Ana has other scenic spots and historical landmarks. These include:

- Cape Engaño Lighthouse/Cove (USA Survivor 27 and 28 filming area)
- Siwangag Cove (USA Survivor 27 and 28 filming area)
- White beaches like Anguib Beach, Mapurao Beach, Nangaramoan Beach, and Puzo Robo Beach
- Gotan mangrove forest and waterfalls
- Suncity Casino in Barangay Tangatan
- Buwacag Falls at Santa Clara (open for public), Padlas Falls at Casambalangan, and Lamesa Falls at Casagan (not yet ready for public)
- Dumasag River at Rapuli
- Takuli riding (a traditional kayak) and firefly watching at Barangay Casagan
- Belt Fishing at Diora-Zinungan

Santa Ana is the game fishing hub of the Philippines. It has hosted international decathlons, where athletes run the rugged terrain of Punta Verde to Cape Engaño, then swim in the Philippine Sea.

== Government ==
=== Local government ===
Santa Ana is part of the first legislative district of the province of Cagayan. It is governed by a mayor, designated as its local chief executive, and by a municipal council as its legislative body in accordance with the Local Government Code. The mayor, vice mayor, and the municipal councilors are elected directly by the people through elections held every three years.

=== Elected officials ===
Members of the Municipal Council (2022–2025)
Position	Name
Congressman	Ramon C. Nolasco Jr.
Mayor	Nelson P. Robinion
Vice-Mayor	Catherine J. Ladrido
Councilors	Delfin A. Nepomuceno III
Councilors	Victoriano T. Fabro Jr.
Councilors	Jovemar A. Castillo
Councilors	Manolo G. Ignacio
Councilors	Jignet Rose A. Guittap
Councilors	Joel A. Martinez
Councilors	Araceli P. Torralba
Councilors	Rexmel C. Eslava

== Education ==
The Schools Division of Cagayan governs the town's public education system. The division office is a field office of the Philippine Department of Education in the Cagayan Valley region. The Sta. Ana Schools District Office governs the public and private elementary and high schools throughout the municipality. These include schools with culturally integrated curricula for Indigenous Aeta students.

=== Primary and elementary schools ===
- Advanced Academy of Northern Philippines (Elementary School)
- Apolagan Elementary School
- Casagan Elementary School
- Casambalangan Elementary School
- Diora-Zinungan Elementary School
- Dungeg Elementary School
- Kapanikian Elementary School
- Marede Elementary School
- Pagadalan Dagiti Agta iti Sta Ana Cagayan Association (PAG-ASACA) - Bantay Balligi
- Pagadalan Dagiti Agta iti Sta Ana Cagayan Association (PAG-ASACA) - Domasag
- Pagadalan Dagiti Agta iti Sta Ana Cagayan Association (PAG-ASACA) - Palaui
- Palaui Elementary School
- Palawig Elementary School
- Pananacpan Elementary School
- Pasmakanan Elementary School
- Patunungan Elementary School
- Racat Elementary School
- Rapuli Elementary School
- RJ Dama Christian Academy
- San Vicente Elementary School
- St. Anthony's College (Elementary School)
- Sta. Ana Central School
- Sta. Clara Elementary School
- Tangatan Elementary School
- The Promised Land Christian School of Santa Ana
- Visitacion Elementary School

=== Secondary schools ===
- Advanced Academy of Northern Philippines (High School)
- Casambalangan National High School
- Sta. Ana Fishery National High School
- St. Anthony's College (High School)

=== Higher educational institution ===
- St. Anthony's College

== Culture ==
Every year from May 26 to May 30, the town hosts the Viray Festival, organized by the local government with the support of the regional tourism office and the private sector. Launched in June 2005, the Viray Festival was conceived to dramatize the significance of the viray, which played a key role in the lives and history of the town.

A viray is a large, flat wooden boat which, before the emergence of gasoline-fed engines in the early 1950s, was propelled by sails. Traders used large virays measuring 18 metres (59 ft) long, 5 metres (16 ft) wide and 3.5 metres (11 ft) high. Fishermen, on the other hand, used smaller ones, usually 11 metres (36 ft) long, 5 metres (16 ft) wide and 2.5 metres (8 ft 2 in) high. Equipped with oars to reach nearby fishing grounds, these types sailed for longer distances.

Due to its capacity to carry great quantities of cargo, the viray was the only means of transport used by the first settlers of Santa Ana.

Leaders and well-off families gained income from the services of the viray, ranging from fishing, commerce and trading to means of transport during the years when Santa Ana was in its prime. They used the viray for fishing, as the boats could carry fishing gear, provisions, supplies, and people. It was assisted by small bancas during fishing operations.

An annual fluvial parade of colorful boats is held during the first day. The second day of the festival features a grand carabao parade where each of the sixteen barangays composing the municipality take their turn to show off their artistic talents. On the third day, both locals and visitors line up along the main street to watch people participating in the street dancing competition.

=== Sports ===
Santa Ana is also known for kiteboarding and windsurfing. In 2015, the Philippine Windsurfing Association and the Philippine Kiteboarding Association organized a competition off Anguib Beach.

In 2016, the Beach Volleyball Republic league hosted the third leg of the Nationwide On Tour on Anguib Beach. Beach volleyball players Charo Soriano and Filipino-American Alexa Micek won the third leg of the tournament.

== Media ==
- 97.5 MHz Academy Radio Santa Ana
- 100.7 MHz Radyo Santa Ana
